= Counterinsurgency in Manchuria =

1931–42 Japanese military operation

- Part of the interwar period, the Second Sino-Japanese War, the China Burma India Theater and the Pacific Theater of World War II
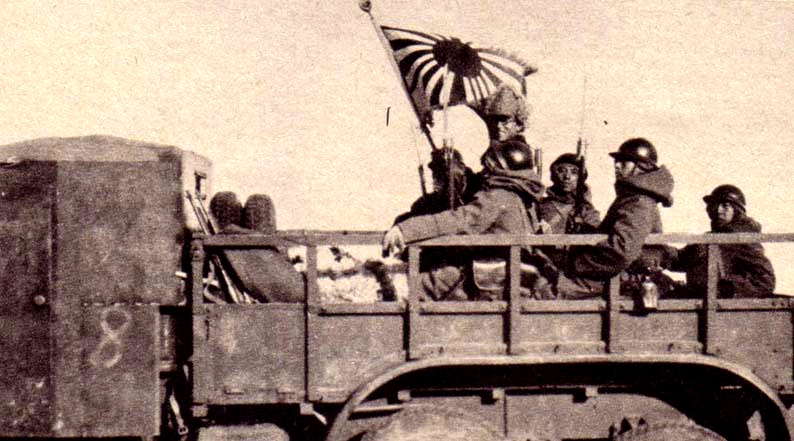
- Japanese troops in Manchuria, 1931
Date	4 November 1931 – July 1942
Location	Manchukuo
Result	Japanese-Manchukuo victory

Belligerents
China: Anti-Japanese volunteer armies; Korean communists	Japan: Manchukuo

Commanders and leaders
(Republic of China (1912–1949)) Ma Zhanshan (Republic of China (1912–1949)) Zhao Shangzhi (Republic of China (1912–1949)) Yang Jingyu † (Republic of China (1912–1949)) Zhou Baozhong (Republic of China (1912–1949)) Li Zhaolin (Republic of China (1912–1949)) Ding Chao (Republic of China (1912–1949)) Feng Zhanhai (Republic of China (1912–1949)) Tang Juwu † (Republic of China (1912–1949)) Wang Fengge (Republic of China (1912–1949)) Wang Delin (Republic of China (1912–1949)) Su Bingwen (Republic of China (1912–1949)) Zhang Haitian (Republic of China (1912–1949)) Ji Hongchang; Choe Hyon; Kim Il Sung	(Empire of Japan) Shigeru Honjō (Empire of Japan) Nobuyoshi Mutō (Empire of Japan) Takashi Hishikari (Empire of Japan) Jirō Minami (Empire of Japan) Kenkichi Ueda (Empire of Japan) Yoshijirō Umezu (Empire of Japan) Seishirō Itagaki (Manchukuo) Xi Qia (Manchukuo) Ma Zhanshan (until 1932) (Manchukuo) Zhang Haipeng (Manchukuo) Yu Zhishan

Strength
300,000	Japanese: 84,000; Manchurian: 111,000

Casualties and losses
Unknown	Unknown

Counterinsurgency in Manchuria
- Simplified Chinese: 东北抗战
- Traditional Chinese: 東北抗戰
- Literal meaning: Northeast Resistance War
Transcriptions
Standard Mandarin
- Hanyu Pinyin: Dōngběi Kàngzhàn
Yue: Cantonese
- Jyutping: dung1 bak1 kong3 zin3

The Counterinsurgency in Manchuria (also referred to as the Pacification of Manchukuo by some sources) was a Japanese counterinsurgency campaign to suppress any armed resistance to the newly established puppet state of Manchukuo from various anti-Japanese volunteer armies in occupied Manchuria and later the communist Northeast Anti-Japanese United Army. The operations were carried out by the Imperial Japanese Kwantung Army and the collaborationist forces of the Manchukuo government from March 1932 until 1942, and resulted in a Japanese victory.

== Japan seizes control ==
The earliest formation of large anti-Japanese partisan groups occurred in Liaoning and Jilin provinces due to the poor performance of the Fengtian Army in the first month of the Japanese invasion of Manchuria and to Japan's rapid success in removing and replacing the provincial authority in Fengtian and Jilin.

The provincial government of Liaoning Province had fled west to Jinzhou. Governor Zang Shiyi remained in Mukden, but refused to cooperate with the Japanese in establishing a separatist and collaborationist government and was imprisoned. The Kwantung Army issued a proclamation on 21 September 1931 installing Colonel Kenji Doihara as Mayor of Mukden; he proceeded to rule the city with the aid of an "Emergency Committee" composed mostly of Japanese.

On 23 September 1931, Lieutenant General Xi Qia of the Jilin Army was invited by the Japanese to form a provisional government for Jilin Province. In Jilin, the Japanese succeeded in achieving a bloodless occupation of the capital. General Xi Qia issued a proclamation on 30 September, declaring the province independent of the Republic of China under protection of the Japanese Army.

On 24 September 1931, a provisional government was formed in Fengtian (the new name of the former Liaoning Province) with Yuan Jinhai as Chairman of the "Committee for the Maintenance of Peace and Order".

In Harbin, General Zhang Jinghui also called a conference on 27 September 1931 to discuss the organization of an "Emergency Committee of the Special District", formed to achieve the secession of Harbin from China. However he was not able to act as much of the area surrounding Harbin was still held by anti-Japanese militias under Generals Ding Chao, Li Du, Feng Zhanhai and others.

Meanwhile, in Mukden, the "North Eastern Administrative Committee," or Self-Government Guiding Board, was set up on 10 November under the leadership of Yu Chung-han, a prominent elder statesman of Zhang Xueliang's Government, who favored the autonomy of Manchuria. After the Japanese defeated General Ma Zhanshan and occupied Qiqihar on 19 November 1931, a local Self-Government Association was established in Heilongjiang Province; and General Zhang Jinghui was inaugurated as Governor of the Province on 1 January 1932.

After the fall of Jinzhou, the independence movement made rapid progress in northern Manchuria, where Colonel Doihara was Chief of Special Services in Harbin. General Zhang Jinghui, upon learning of the defeat of Marshal Zhang Xueliang at Jinzhou, agreed to the request of the Self-Government Guiding Board at Mukden and declared the independence of Heilongjiang Province on 7 January 1932. After General Ma Zhanshan had been driven from Qiqihar by the Japanese in the Jiangqiao Campaign he had retreated northeastward with his beaten and depleted forces and had set up his capital at Hailun. There he attempted to continue to govern Heilongjiang province. Colonel Kenji Doihara began negotiations with General Ma from his Special Service Office at Harbin, hoping to get him to join the new state of Manchukuo Japan was organizing. Ma continued negotiating with Doihara, while he continued to support General Ding Chao.

== Early resistance: militias, brotherhoods and bandits ==
The emergence of Chinese resistance to the Japanese occupation of Manchuria in the form of citizen militias, peasant brotherhoods and bandit gangs was facilitated by Japan's success in rapidly destroying Zhang Xueliang's government in the region. Most of the Kwantung Army's strength during November 1931 was concentrated against General Ma Zhanshan in north-central Heilongjiang, and in December and early January against Zhang Xueliang's remaining army in Jinzhou in southwestern Liaoning. Away from the Japanese garrisons in cities and along the railroads, resistance units mustered openly and relatively free from molestation in late 1931–early 1932.

=== Militias ===
The frontier status of Manchuria, with endemic banditry and activities by opposing warlords, led leading citizens and village authorities to form private militias for the protection of their property and landholdings even before the Japanese invasion of Manchuria. After the start of the Japanese occupation, these militias became partisan bands, often known as "plain-clothes" men from their lack of uniforms, and styled themselves with various names, such as the "Self-Protection Militia", "Anti-Japanese Militia", or "Chinese Volunteers". One of the first such forces to form, called the Courageous Citizens Militia, had been established by November 1931 near the estuary port of Jinzhou. These militias operated principally in southern Fengtian, which had half of Manchuria's population and the highest proportion of Han Chinese. Fengtian had come almost immediately under Japanese control, as most population centers and its capital of Mukden all lay along the tracks of the South Manchuria Railway in the S.M.R. Zone, which had been garrisoned by Kwantung Army troops since long before the conflict.

=== Peasant brotherhoods ===
"Peasant brotherhoods" were a traditional form of mutual protection by Chinese small-holders and tenant farmers. Waves of immigrants fleeing the wars of the Warlord era that ravaged north and central China came to Manchuria since 1926 at the rate of one million a year. These included many peasants belonging to the two predominant brotherhoods, the Red Spear Society and the Big Swords Society, which aided the immigrants in establishing themselves and provided for protection against both bandits and rapacious landlords.

The Red Spear Society was strongest in the hinterlands of Fengtian and countryside around Harbin. The Big Swords Society predominated in southeastern Jilin and adjoining parts of Fengtian. In 1927, the Big Swords had spearheaded an uprising triggered by the collapse of the prevailing Feng-Piao paper currency. During the rebellion the Big Swords were respected by the peasants because they did not harm or plunder the common people, but resisted the officials of the warlord Zhang Zuolin.

After the Japanese invasion, the Big Swords Society disturbed the Jiandao in southeast Fengtian along the Korean border, and rose en masse in response to the declaration of Manchukuo on 9 March 1932. The Big Swords became the principal component of partisan resistance in this region, forming loose ties with the Anti-Japanese Volunteer Armies. The bandit leader Zhang Haitian commanded several bands of Big Swords in western Fengtian. The Big Swords in southeast Jilin were allied with Wang Delin, and General Feng Zhanhai organized and trained a Big Sword Corps of 4,000 men.

The Red Spear Society groups were more widespread. Members formed important centers of resistance as the war spread out through the countryside. Red Spears frequently attacked the S.M.R. Zone from the Xinlitun and Dongfeng districts, close to Mukden and the Fushun coal mines. They were led by a young officer of the Fengtian Army, Tang Juwu. Red Spear Society units displayed extraordinary staying power in this area; almost two years after the Mukden Incident, a group of 1,000 Red Spear members stormed Dongfeng prefecture near Mukden on 3 June 1933, long after the large Volunteer Armies had been defeated.

However, both the Red Spear Society and the Big Sword Society were made up largely of uneducated and poorly trained peasants, and had a traditionalist, quasi-religious character. Members of the brotherhoods placed their faith in rustic magic and belief in the righteous character's Heavenly reward. Big Sword members claimed that their spells made them immune to bullets. Red Spear bands were in many cases led by Buddhist monks as they went into battle, with their clothes and weapons decorated with magic inscriptions similar to that of the earlier Boxer movement.

=== Bandits ===
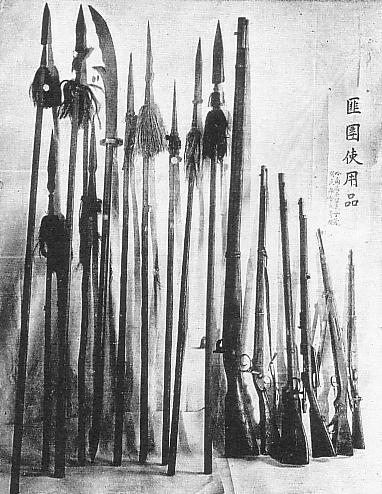
Weapons of Manchurian bandits

Northeastern China was a poorly governed frontier area at the turn of the 20th century and banditry was endemic. Some were hardened criminals who pillaged for a living; others were part-time bandits who robbed only to survive when crops failed and they could not make a living on the land. As the population of Manchuria increased through the 1920s, some newcomers became squatters, then wanderers, and then outlaws. Even in the settled Fengtian province, bandits known as Honghuzi ("red beards") were common along tune Beijing–Mukden railway and in the wooded southeast of the province along the Mukden-Dandong railway near Korea. Powerful bandit gangs operated within a day's march of such major cities as Mukden and Harbin. The term "shanlin" was often used to describe the bandits because they knew the local terrain very well. Most operated in a fairly small area and maintained the goodwill of local peasants. Government troops had great difficulty in suppressing them as would the Japanese and Manchukuo forces in later years.

There was also a tradition of nationalistic banditry, dating back to the Russian invasion in July 1900 when Tsarist forces were sent to Manchuria, ostensibly to protect the Russian-owned Chinese Eastern Railway after the Boxer Rebellion. Wang Delin, who opposed both the Russians and the Qing dynasty, led a major bandit force against the Russians. His career as an outlaw continued until 1917, when he agreed to join the Jilin provincial forces. For former bandits to join the regular army was quite common in the Warlord Era, as the bandits formed a convenient source of new soldiers. The converse was true as well. As the Fengtian Army retreated from the Japanese onslaught, thousands of soldiers deserted into the countryside to resume their former careers as bandits. During the Russo-Japanese War, many bandit groups actively cooperated with the Japanese Army, providing valuable military intelligence on Russian troop movements and deployment, and assisting in the securing of supplies.

After December 1931, the Japanese Army began operations "for the clearance of bandits" into the Fengtian countryside beyond the South Manchuria Railway Zone in counties west of Mukden, largely due to repeated bandit attacks, robberies and kidnappings on the Dalian-Mukden trains. Fighting supported by aircraft reportedly broke up several of the bandit gangs. In consequence bandits now resented the Japanese invasion, and began retaliatory attacks against isolated Japanese communities along the Mukden-Dandong railway. Honghuzi chieftain Zhang Haitian led several thousand followers to attack the southern portion of the S.M.R. mainline. The Japanese garrison of Niuzhuang (zh) was encircled and attacked by "1500 Chinese bandits under Zhang Haitian," while other troops under his orders attacked in the Haicheng area. Japanese reinforcements quickly dispatched from Mukden forced Zhang's retirement, but Zhang Haitian re-emerged later as a Volunteer Army general, and was acclaimed as commander by both local peasant brotherhoods and anti-Japanese militias.

Many bandits were admitted into the Volunteer Armies as the Japanese conquest advanced and the partisan resistance became an increasingly popular cause.

== Formation of the Anti-Japanese Volunteer Armies ==
=== Resistance in Harbin ===
When General Xi Qia of the Jilin Army declared the province independent of the Republic of China, military and civil authorities in the province fractured into "New Jilin" adherents of his regime and loyalist "Old Jilin" elements in opposition to it; the former predominated near the capital and the latter predominated in Harbin and the rugged hinterland to the north and east.

Hostilities did not commence in the Harbin area until the end of January 1932, at about the same time as the January 28 Incident. General Ding Chao decided to defend the city, a key hub of rail and river communications in the north, against the approach of first General Xi Qia's "New Jilin" Army and then Japanese troops. He appealed to Harbin's Chinese residents to join his railway garrison regulars, and hundreds of volunteers joined the Jilin Self-Defence Army. The Defense of Harbin at the start of February, that rallied Harbin in the way that had already formed militias in Fengtian, convinced local authorities and leading citizens in the hinterlands of Jilin that they should resist Japan's occupation of the province and form their own bands and militia units.

General Ding Chao's beaten Jilin Self-Defence Army retired from Harbin to the northeast down the Sungari River, to join the Lower Sungari garrison of General Li Du to form the nucleus of armed opposition in north Jilin. Meanwhile, in southeast Jilin Wang Delin, a battalion commander and former bandit chieftain in the region established the Chinese People's National Salvation Army (NSA), on 8 February 1932. Numbering over 1,000 men at the time, within a few months this army became a rallying point for resistance and one of the most successful of the volunteer armies.

=== Foundation of Manchukuo ===
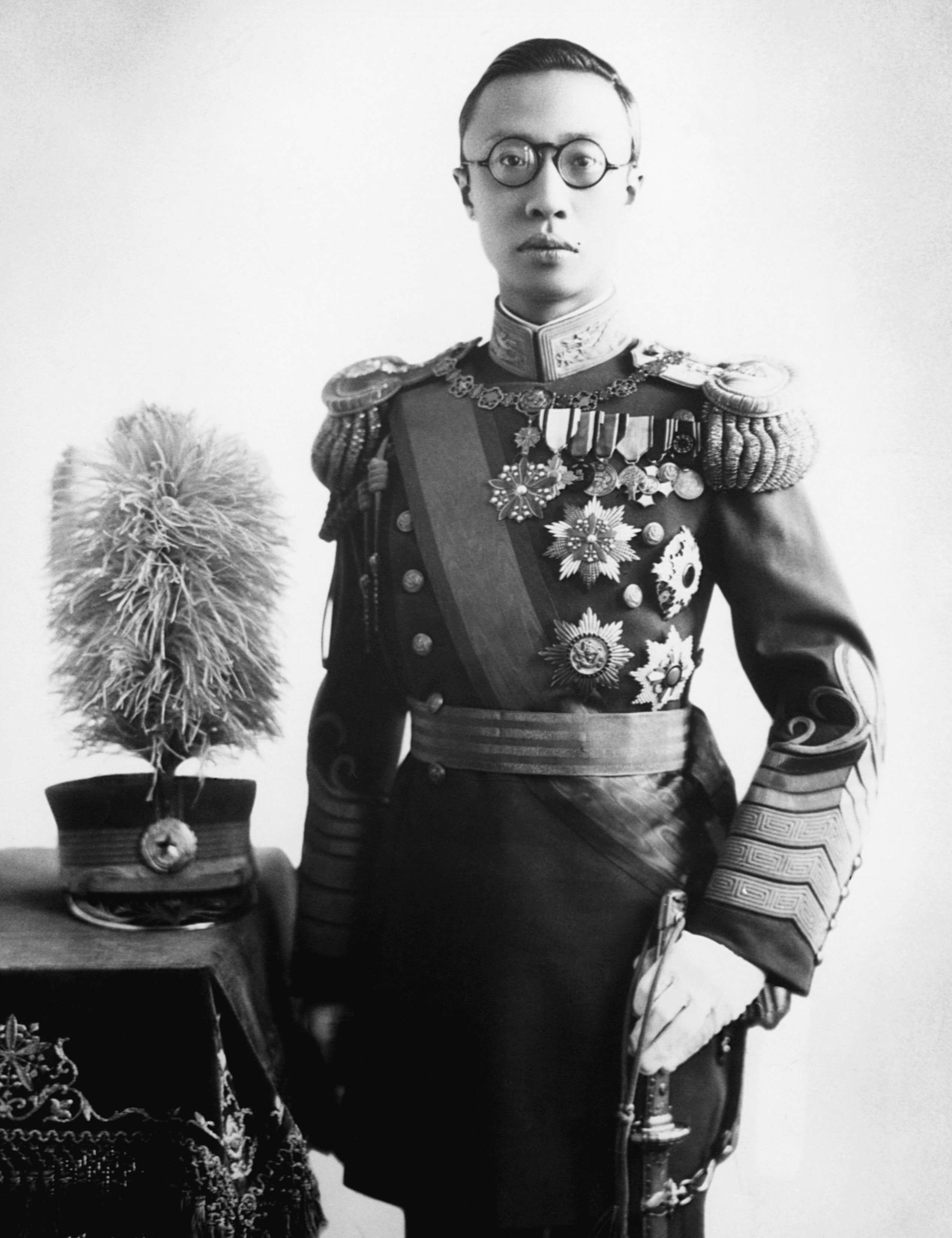
Puyi, Emperor of Manchukuo

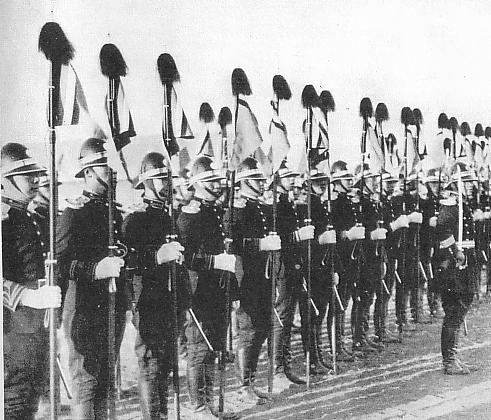
Manchukuo Honor Guard

With General Ding Chao defeated, Ma Zhanshan agreed to defect to the new Manchukuo Imperial Army on 14 February 1932 and retained his post as Governor of Heilongjiang Province in exchange for cooperating with the Japanese.

On 27 February 1932, General Ding Chao offered to cease hostilities, ending official Chinese resistance in Manchuria.

Within days Henry Puyi, the Manchurian former emperor of China deposed in 1911, was made provisional president of the independent state of Manchukuo by the resolution of an All-Manchuria convention at Mukden, whose members included General Ma Zhanshan flown in from the north. The next day on 1 March the provisional Manchukuo Government was established with Ma Zhanshan as its Minister of War, in addition to his post as provincial governor. On 9 March, the State of Manchukuo was inaugurated. The Chinese Government announced that not only did it not recognize the new state, but asserted that Puyi been kidnapped by the Japanese.

Despite the end of official resistance with the defeat of General Ding Chao, all was not calm in Manchuria. In late February General Wang Delin with 1,000 militia wrecked or burned 18 bridges on the Jilin-Dunhua Railway. Wang also recaptured the town of Dunhua on 20 February. In March 1932 a Japanese and Manchukuo expeditionary force sent against Wang was defeated in a series of battles around the shore of Lake Jingpo losing hundreds of casualties. These battles were small in scale, with the militias using their knowledge of the local terrain to set ambushes, eventually compelling the Japanese to retreat to Harbin.

That the Japanese had suffered a military defeat at the hands of a motley collection of irregular forces was a considerable political embarrassment. Japan was anxious to present Manchukuo to the world as a peaceful nation, especially as a League of Nations delegation was now investigating the situation. When the news of the victories of Wang's Chinese People's National Salvation Army spread around eastern Jilin, hundreds of troops who had been reluctant members of the new Manchukuo Imperial Army defected to the NSA and estimates of its total strength in April rose from 4,500 to above 10,000 and, possibly nearer 15,000 organized in five brigades.

== War of the Volunteer Armies and "Anti-bandit Operations" 1932–1933 ==
=== The conflict begins ===
Following the establishment of Manchukuo, fires were set in the Japanese quarter of Mukden. General Honjo's train suffered an attack which was repulsed, and minor revolts began in the remoter parts of Manchuria.

With the end of winter in 1932, the Japanese launched expeditions from Harbin into the interior of Jilin province, striking northeast down the Sungari River and east along the Chinese Eastern Railway mainline against General Ding's Jilin Self-Defence Army, (called the "Anti-Jilin Army" by the Japanese). This was the Subjugation of the Anti-Jilin Army campaign in Jilin province that lasted from March to June 1932. The campaign pushed the Jilin forces into the north and east of the Jilin province and secured control of the Sungari River, however, Ding's forces continued to resist, sometimes occupying towns along the eastern section of the Chinese Eastern Railway, between Harbin and the Soviet border.

To the southwest another force under General Li Hai-ching headquartered at Fuyu was in control of the territory round about and southward as far as Nong'an. This force was called the Anti-Japanese Army For The Salvation Of The Country and equipped with light artillery and numerous machine guns. On 29 March 1932, Li Hai-ching's forces defeated regular troops of the Manchukuo Governor Xi Qia outside the town of Nong'an, only 35 miles (56 km) from the capital of Shinkyo. On the previous day, a party of 100 policemen was surrounded by volunteer troops in the afternoon as they were proceeding to Nong'an in a truck convoy carrying 200,000 rounds of rifle ammunition and 50,000 trench mortar shells from the Jilin City Arsenal. All were either taken prisoner or surrendered. Deprived of their supply of ammunition, the resistance of Manchukuo forces in Nong'an dissolved next day. Nong'an was soon reported on the verge of surrender.

Small Japanese detachments sent from Changchun radioed for help, after suffering heavy casualties in the fighting. Japanese forces from the east at Dehui, tried to fight their way through to Nong'an with the support of bombers, but the defenders radio ceased broadcasting, Li's Anti-Japanese Army having captured the town. Finally the next day, the Japanese succeeded in driving Li's forces out of the town mainly as a result of airplane bombing, against which they had little defense.

=== The Revolt of Ma Zhanshan ===
Despite being appointed Minister of War in the Manchukuo government and provincial governor, Muslim General Ma Zhanshan was kept under very strict control by the Japanese military. He had to ask for approval from his Japanese advisor on all matters regarding the provincial administration. Dissatisfied with the situation, Ma raised and re-equipped his private army in secret using Japanese money and weapons. As the Governor of Heilongjiang, he used his authority to secretly transport weapons and ammunition out of the arsenals and evacuated the wives and families of his troops to safety. He then led his troops out of Qiqihar on 1 April, stating that he was going on a military inspection tour.

At Heihe on 7 April, Ma announced the reestablishment of the "Heilongjiang Provincial Government" independent of Manchukuo, and reorganized his troops into 9 brigades at the beginning of May. Ma also established another eleven troops of volunteers at Bei'an, Gannan, Keshan, Kedong and other places. This became the Northeast Anti-Japanese National Salvation Army. Ma was also appointed nominal commander-in-chief, over all other Anti-Japanese Volunteer Armies that were forming in various locations, and commanded a total fighting force of about 300,000 men at peak strength according to Japanese estimates.

After sending some troops to aid General Ding Chao in the lower Sungari River area, Ma struck out toward Harbin with six infantry and cavalry regiments, 20 field artillery pieces and a small squadron of seven planes. His units set ambushes along major roads and badly mauled Manchukuo and Japanese troops. When he was blocked from reaching Harbin, he turned southwest towards Qiqihar.

At the same time northwest of Harbin, irregular war began to flare up in the countryside of Heilongjiang province. Manchukuo troops mutinied, briefly holding the transportation hubs along the Qiqihar-Keshan and Harbin-Hailun railways, or departing to join the forces of General Ma. Mounted bandits appeared by the hundreds to loot towns on the Chinese Eastern Railway mainline west of Harbin. Other partisans rose up in the Taonan region, disrupting service on the Taonan-Qiqihar railway.

To restore control, the Japanese Army launched the Ma Chan-shan Subjugation campaign from April through July 1932. The Japanese struck northwards up the Harbin-Hailun and Qiqihar-Keshan railways, driving back General Ma's forces, and setting out from the railheads in powerful pincer movements to encircle groups of Ma's troops. General Ma reported on 8 June that he had decided to adopt guerrilla warfare tactics, retaining only one detachment of 1,000 soldiers as his personal command as a regular force. All other units were dispersed as small groups of partisans, roving countryside on horseback. By July, General Ma Zhanshan's troops were seriously depleted in the resulting battles, and only small numbers of men were able to break through the tight Japanese encirclement.

General Ma Zhanshan commanded 3,500 guerilla fighters against the Japanese, conducting attacks such as a raid on the Manchukuo treasury, attacking Changchun, the capital, and hijacking from an airfield six Japanese planes.

General Ma caused so much trouble to the Japanese, that when his equipment and horse were captured, the Japanese presented them to the Emperor in Tokyo, assuming that he was dead. They were enraged to discover that he had survived and escaped.

After General Ma escaped, his men kept up the fight, terrorizing the Japanese invaders. They seized 350 Japanese and Korean hostages and held them for weeks and kidnapped foreigners such as a British General's son and an American executive's wife.

=== Revolts of the Volunteer Armies south of Harbin ===
In late April, the Chinese Eastern Railway was cut 65 miles (105 km) south of Harbin, by an estimated 3,000 Chinese soldiers under General Li Hai-ching. Li's troops ripped up the railway tracks, tore down telegraph wires, and captured a train from Harbin. They looted the train and dispersed before Japanese troops arrived on the scene.

In eastern Manchukuo, Wang Delin's troops set three minor railway stations afire and gutted the city of Suifenhe near the Russian border. Drawing more troops from the seemingly quiet southern Fengtian province, the Japanese launched the Li Hai-ching Subjugation Operation in May 1932. A mixed force of Japanese and Manchukuo troops attacked Li Hai-ching's guerrillas in southern Heilongjiang province from three directions, rapidly dispersing them and securing control of the region.

However, on 21 April 1932, with Japanese forces concentrated in the north, Tang Juwu in eastern Liaoning judged that the time was ripe for his army to go on the offensive. Tang Juwu started the revolt in Huanren and then captured Xinbin and Kuandian. Tang's army, numbering 20,000 men surrounded the Japanese Tonghua garrison. In reaction the Manchukuo police and detachments of the Manchukuo Army attempted to relieve the siege in the First Dongbiandao Clearance. On 8 May he captured Liuhe and took Tonghua soon after. However his force continued as a threat in the region to the east of Mukden and communications with Korea. Based in the Dongbiandao area, his army fought with both the Japanese Kwantung Army stationed in Mukden and the Manchukuo Fengtian Army. Although all major cities had been lost, the volunteer armies gained a new lease of life during the summer of 1932 and reached their greatest strength.

Also in May, Feng Zhanhai and a sizeable detachment of the Jilin Self-Defence Army of 15,000 men in western Jilin province cut communications to the south and east of Harbin. In response the Japanese and Manchukuo armies launched two campaigns to clear Feng's force out of the countryside. From June to July 1932 the Feng Chan-hai Subjugation Operation cleared the Shuangcheng, Acheng, Yushu, Wuchang, and Shulan districts south of Harbin, of Feng's Anti-Japanese forces and forced Feng to retreat to the west.

On 20 June, Feng Zhanhai captured Yushu, Jilin, but after a fierce Japanese counterattack, he was forced to retreat. He then arrived at Wuchang, Heilongjiang, on 4 July and the Japanese defenders fled. On 13 July, Feng Zhanhai captured Shulan.

Massive floods along the Nonni and Sungari Rivers inundated some 10,000 square miles (30,000 km^{2}) round Harbin throughout August, providing a crucial breathing spell to Volunteer Army bands in the plains and lower Sungari, as Japanese operations in the area had to halt until the waters subsided. The Japanese concentrated forces northwest of Harbin against General Ma Zhanshan in spring and summer of 1932, which permitted an escalation of partisan activity in Jilin and Fengtian provinces, which culminated in simultaneous attacks on cities throughout the South Manchurian Railway Zone when the August floods both halted Japanese operations based on Harbin, and isolated the troops engaged on them. However, the floods also ruined crops not already destroyed in the war, putting more pressure on the Volunteer Armies, which foraged for their sustenance in the countryside.

=== Defeat of the Volunteer Armies ===
Mongolian bandit forces were able to attack the Ssutao (Siping - Taonan) Railway where it was isolated by the flooding in August, and took the small town of Tongyu. On August 20 a Manchukuo relieving force was sent on the Mongolian Bandit Subjugation Operation and after a short battle Tonyu was recovered on 31 August 1932.

On 2 September 1932 during the Second Feng Chan-hai Subjugation operation a force of the Manchukuo Jilin Guard Army cornered Feng Zhanhai's Volunteer Army retreating from the previous subjugation operation. Although surrounded, over half the guerrillas were able to slip through the encirclement and make good their escape to Jehol.

==== Su Bingwen's revolt ====
General Su Bingwen the "Barga District" at the extreme west of Heilongjiang on the Soviet frontier, had kept his isolated command beyond the Greater Khingan mountains, free any of the fighting or any Japanese troops, doing nothing in support of either Manchukuo or Ma Zhanshan. As a consequence the farmers settled along the Chinese Eastern Railway mainline west of Qiqihar had remained undisturbed by warfare and were able to get in their harvests.

On 27 September 1932 when the Japanese turned their attention south to restore the security of the vital facilities in the southern Manchukuo which were endangered by the activities of the Volunteer Armies, General Su Bingwen's soldiers staged a mutiny, seizing hundreds of Japanese civilians and isolated military personnel as hostages. The mutineers, calling themselves the Heilongjiang National Salvation Army moved eastwards aboard trains to join General Ma Zhanshan in recapturing the provincial capital of Qiqihar.

Ma Zhanshan had emerged onto the plains again from his shelter in the Lesser Khingan mountains along the Amur River after the Japanese had defeated his forces in the north. He arrived in Longmen County in September and joined Su Bingwen's mutineers for a joint campaign.

However food shortages were particularly acute in Heilongjiang after the devastation wrought by the August flooding. The Heilongjiang troops and Ma's Army were being supplied with provisions commandeered unwillingly from local farmers, and soon there was nothing left to seize.

In mid-October, Ma's forces captured Anda west of Harbin on the C. E. R. mainline, forced the merchants of the city to give 50,000 dollars to them, and confiscated every horse they could find. On 26 October Laha, a town 70 miles (110 km) north of Qiqihar, was attacked by Ma's forces with their remaining artillery in support. The Japanese garrison was subjected to a long, intensive, and well-directed bombardment.

For eight days the Japanese garrison commanded by a Captain Hayashi at Taian on the Qiqihar-Koshen railway was encircled by some 4,000 Volunteers, until it succeeded in repulsing them on 28 October following severe fighting, in which twenty eight Japanese (including Captain Hayashi) were killed or wounded. A cavalry detachment, the Kawase Detachment of 59 horsemen sent out toward Taian, disappeared on the frosted prairie. On 8 November, the sole survivor, a Sergeant Iwakami, arrived in Qiqihar to tell how the detachment had been annihilated outside Taian.

In reaction, the Japanese organized the Su Ping-wei Subjugation Campaign from November to December 1932. Nearly 30,000 Japanese and Manchukuo soldiers including the Japanese 14th Infantry Division and Mongol cavalrymen of the Manchukuo Xing'an Army directed a fierce campaign against Su and Ma's troops. On 28 November 1932, Japanese 14th division attacked Ma Zhanshan and Su Bingwen around Qiqihar. Japanese planes bombed Ma Zhanshan's headquarters in Hailar. By 3 December, the Japanese took Ma Zhanshan's Hailar headquarters. And the following day, after heavy fighting, Ma Zhanshan and Su Bingwen with the remnants of their forces fled Hailar for the Soviet border and entered Russian territory on 5 December. Most of their troops were later transferred to Rehe.

==== Final Operations in eastern Manchukuo ====
Diverted from their preparations for invading Jehol province by the widespread partisan activity by the forces of Ma and Su in Heilongjiang, Japanese forces concentrated to the west. The forces of Feng Zhanhai and Wang Delin in Fengtian and Jilin were thus free to attack the railroads and other places in the South Manchuria Railway Zone and managed to briefly occupy the capital of Jilin province.

On 10 September 1932, at Dehui on the C. E. R. spur-line between Changchun and Harbin, 1,000 bandits drove out the Manchukuo garrison. They then looted the town for two hours as fighting went on. The garrison was able to rally and counterattack and repulse their opponents. On a raid on 11 September, Volunteer Army partisans derailed a train between Changchun and Harbin and robbed the survivors, kidnapping some for ransom, including five Japanese. On 15 September, a Red Spear militia not from the area, but merely passing through Pingdingshan village, fired on Japanese soldiers and later attacked the Japanese garrison in the nearby industrial city of Fushun. The next day in retaliation Japanese soldiers and police in tracking the rebels as they fled back through the villages, assumed all who were in the vicinity either to be members of the militia or their confederates and punished them, by burning homes and summary execution, bayoneting and machine-gunning village residents and killing some 3,000 men, women, and children, leaving only one survivor in the whole village. This became known as the Pingdingshan Massacre.

Meanwhile, in October to the west, a Manchukuo and Japanese force in the Li Hai-ching Subjugation, confronted the 3,000 man Li Hai-ching guerrilla force that had returned to attack Manchukuo and Japanese forces in south Heilongjiang province and forced their retreat into Jehol province.

Finally the Japanese took the initiative in the east. In mid-October, the Japanese estimated Tang Juwu's forces in the fourteen counties of south and eastern Fengtian at about 30,000 men. On 11 October 1932, the Japanese counterattacked in the Second Dongbiandao Subjugation. The Fengtian Army of seven brigades supported a Japanese force of two cavalry brigades and one mixed brigade that spearheaded the clearance of guerrillas from the Dongbiandao district. They attacked Tang Juwu's forces in the Tonghua and Huanren area. Tang Juwu broke through the Japanese encirclement to the west. On the 16th, the Japanese took over Tonghua, and on the 17th, Huanren, suffering casualties of 500 men while killing 270 and capturing 1,000.

Following that operation up from October to November 1932 in the Shenyang, Changchun, Jilin Subjugation the Japanese swept through the territory between Mukden, Changchun and Jilin, and forcing the Chinese guerrilla forces of Wang Delin to retreat towards Huinan and Siping.

From 6 November to 20 November 1932, the Manchukuo Army launched the Ki Feng - Lung District Subjugation Operation clearing the Ki Feng-lung district of guerrillas with 5,000 Manchukuo soldiers consisting of a battalion of the Manchukuo Imperial Guards and the 2nd Cavalry Regiment of the Fengtian Army and a Cavalry detachment of the Jilin Army.

The Third Dongbiandao Subjugation operation, from 22 November to 5 December 1932, was launched to finally clear the remnants of Tang Juwu's guerrilla forces that had regrouped after the Second Dongbiandao Subjugation campaign. The Manchukuo force was made up of a unit of Manchukuo Imperial Guards as well as locally raised militia forces from the Yalu, Central and Shenghai districts totaling 5,000 men. The operation was a success and led to the capture of 1,800 "bandits", some of whom were later recruited into the Manchukuo Army.

On 24 December 1932, the Japanese 10th Division attacked guerrilla forces to the north of Mudanjiang River. 5 January 1933, General Kuan Chang-ching was forced to surrender his Volunteers at Suifenhe on the Soviet frontier. On 7 January 1933, Japanese took over Mishan. On 9 January 1933, Li Du's guerrilla forces crossed Ussuri River into the USSR. On 5 January, the Japanese began assaulting Dongning, Heilongjiang and on 13 January, Wang Delin and the remaining militias were forced to retreat from Dongning to the Soviet Union By the end of February 1933, most of the large Volunteer Armies had dispersed into small guerrilla bands or had fled to the Soviet Union.

=== Aftermath ===
This was not the end of the Volunteer Armies. Some fought on as small guerrilla units, frequently called "shanlin". The bandit experiences of some of the commanders stood them in good stead for they were adept at surviving in the Manchurian winters and adapted to guerrilla warfare and they continued to harass the Japanese and Manchukuo forces for many years.

The Japanese were forced to tie up considerable military forces and assets to continuously sweep the region with company-sized patrols for many months. Occasionally they organized larger operations. After a resurgence of activity the Japanese were forced to organize the large-scale Jilin Province Subjugation operation in October and November 1933. It involved 35,000 men of the Manchukuo Army in an attempt to clear the province of Jilin entirely of guerrillas. The Manchukuo force included the whole of the Jilin Army as well as the elements of the Heilongjiang Army, Xing'an Army and the Xinjin Independent Cavalry Detachment. The operation was deemed a success and led to the capture and death of a number of anti-Japanese commanders.

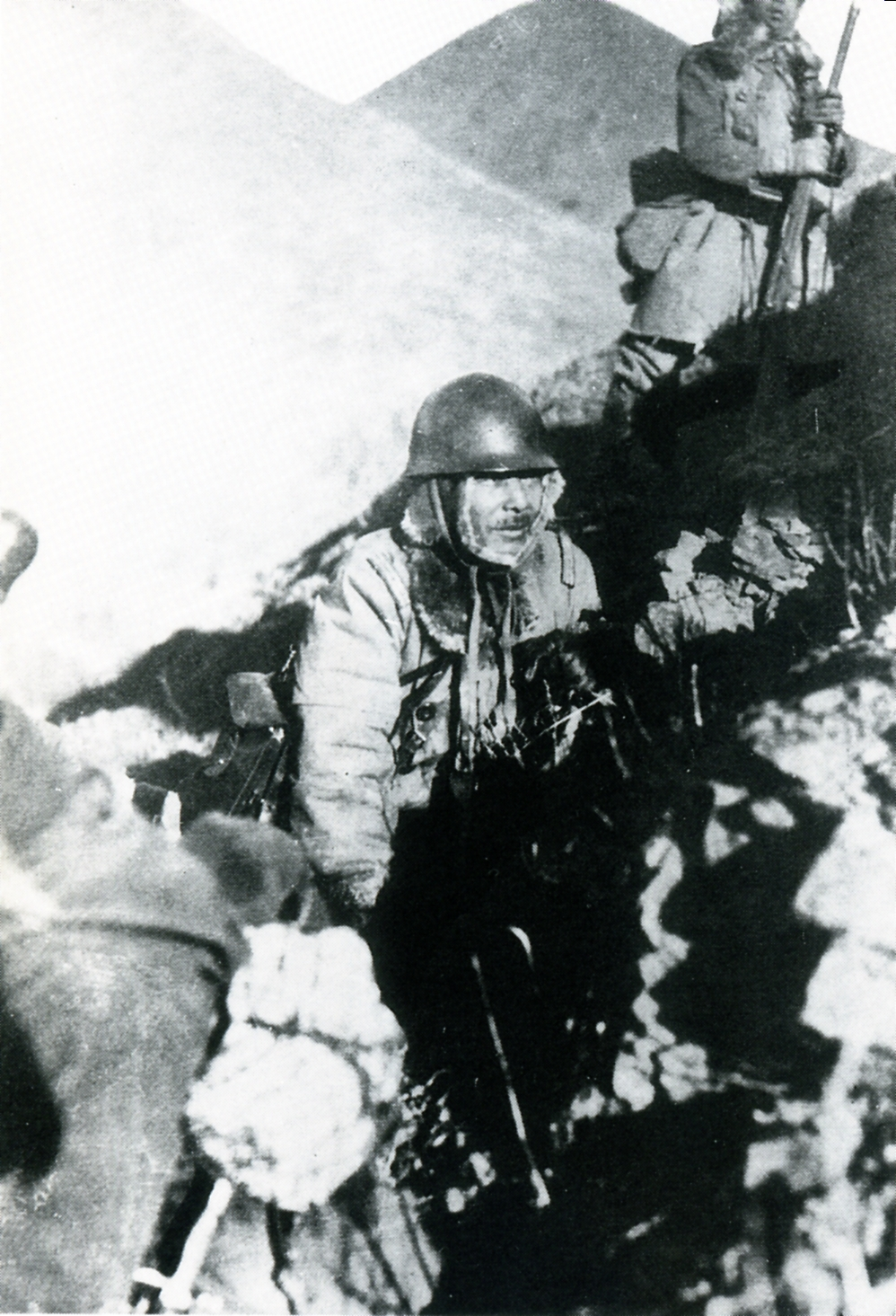
Japanese troops during the Battle of Rehe

Of the forces that fled Manchukuo, Feng Zhanhai and his men went on to serve against the Japanese Operation Nekka in Rehe and later with Feng Yuxiang's Chahar People's Anti-Japanese Army in Chahar 1933. His forces were incorporated into the National Revolutionary Army as a division and fought in the Second Sino-Japanese War. Tang Juwu fought against the Japanese in Rehe, and was made head of the Northeast Anti-Japanese Volunteer 3rd Corps. After the outbreak of the Second Sino-Japanese War, he was assigned to operate behind the Japanese lines where he was killed on May 18, 1939. After his retreat to the Soviet Union, Su Bingwen served the Kuomintang government as a military board member and military inspection group director during the Second Sino-Japanese War. Out of favor with Chiang kai-Shek, it was not until after the Marco Polo Bridge Incident that Ma Zhanshan was made commander of the Northeastern Advance Force in charge guerrilla operations in the four northeastern provinces of Liaoning, Jilin, Heilongjiang and Rehe. Ma led his troops to fight the Japanese in Chahar, Suiyuan, Datong and Shanxi areas and he cooperated with Fu-Zuyi's troops in the defense of Suiyuan. Ma was appointed as chairman of the government of Heilongjiang in August 1940, and continued to hold that position to the end of the war.

Of the Volunteer guerrilla leaders remaining in Manchukuo, Wang Fengge was captured in 1937 and executed, along with his wife and child. Wu Yicheng fought on with a small band of followers until 1937. Although Kong Xianrong, Wang Delin's deputy, gave up the struggle, his wife and another of Wang Delin's subordinates, Yao Zhenshan, led a small band which fought on until the spring of 1941 when it was annihilated.

== Communists and the Northeast Anti-Japanese United Army 1934–1942 ==
=== Early conflict with the anti-Japanese armies ===
After the invasion of Manchuria in 1931, the Chinese Communist Party organized a number of small anti-Japanese guerrilla units dedicated both to resistance against the Japanese and also to social revolution. However these units were far smaller than the various Anti-Japanese Volunteer Armies which had been raised, based on patriotic appeal.

When the first Volunteer Armies were organized, the Communist Party was initially completely hostile, mistrusting their motives and leadership. They also feared that the Volunteer Armies would give the Japanese a pretext for attacking the Soviet Union. The Communist Party in northeast China even issued an appeal for the volunteers to kill their officers and join the Communists in a social revolution.

Despite Party disapproval, some Communist Party members joined or rendered assistance to the various Anti-Japanese Volunteer Armies, and some rose to senior positions within the volunteer forces. They were particularly influential in Wang Delin's Chinese People's National Salvation Army (NSA), where Li Yanlu and Zhou Baozhong became high-ranking officers. At first the Party severely criticized their conduct.

However, the Communists eventually had to face the fact that their current propaganda made them almost irrelevant to the anti-Japanese cause. The actions of Party members who joined or aided the various Anti-Japanese Volunteer Armies eventually persuaded the international Communist movement to move towards a popular front policy in 1935. The Communist Party came to accept that whole-hearted support for the anti-Japanese movement and the postponement of revolutionary goals was essential if the Chinese Communists were to remain a serious political force.

In 1934, after the defeat of the large Volunteer Armies, there were still various resistance forces with an estimated 50,000 men still in the field. All the Communist Party units were reorganized into the single Northeast Anti-Japanese United Army, with Zhao Shangzhi as Commander-in-chief. The army was open to all who wanted to resist the Japanese and as it proclaimed its willingness to ally with all other anti-Japanese forces, this army won over some of the shanlin bands, including former NSA units.

=== United Front ===
In 1935, when the Party officially changed policy, and began creating a united front, the army welcomed and absorbed most of the remaining anti-Japanese forces in Manchuria and some Korean resistance fighters including Kim Il Sung. The number of insurgents in 1935 stood at about 40,000 men. The army was organized into Yang Jingyu's 1st Route Army (Fengtian Province), Zhou Baozhong's 2nd Route Army (Jilin Province), and Li Zhaolin's 3rd Route Army (Heilongjiang Province). The army's strategy was to form pockets of resistance in occupied areas, to harass the Japanese troops and undermine their attempts at administration, and when the Second Sino-Japanese War began in earnest in 1937, to make attacks to keep as many Japanese troops as possible from being sent into China. It conducted a protracted campaign which threatened the stability of the Manchukuo regime, especially during 1936 and 1937.

The recently reformed Manchukuo Imperial Army replied with a major campaign with 16,000 men from October 1936 to March 1937, against the 1st Route Army in the Dongbiandao region. This was the first time it operated against the guerrillas without the support of Japanese troops. Despite heavy casualties the Manchukuo Army managed to kill over two thousand guerrillas including some of their leaders. Thus, the number of insurgents declined to 30,000 in 1936; and 20,000 in 1937.

An even larger and longer campaign from November 1937 to March 1939, was waged by 24,000 Manchukuo troops against the 2nd Route Army in the area between the Amur, Sungari and Ussuri Rivers. In the latter half of 1938, the Japanese Army concentrated troops in eastern Fengtian province, to encircle the remnants of Yang Jingyu's army, the most dangerous of the Anti-Japanese forces, with the most reliable base area. Although the Japanese managed to cut off the supply lines to the guerrillas, they persevered, frequently launching attacks that compelled the Japanese and Manchukuoans to divert forces into punitive expeditions against them.

As of September 1938, the number of insurgents had dwindled to an estimated 10,000 combatants as a result of years of fighting and privation. The Kwantung Army then brought reinforcements with a plan to mop up the remaining anti-Japanese forces in Fengtian. This operation gradually produced a critical lack of supplies, and from January to mid-February 1940 Yang Jingyu led the struggle until he died on 23 February 1940, trying to break out of the encirclement when an officer betrayed his detachment.

With its strongest armies dispersed or destroyed and its base areas pacified, the remnant resistance fighters, including Kim Il Sung, were gradually forced to retreat into Siberia between 1940 and 1942. In November 1941, Li Zhaolin entered the Soviet Union. By July 1942 Zhou Baozhong followed. Finally on 12 February 1942, Zhao Shangzhi was captured by Japanese military police after being attacked by one of their agents, and later died.

In the Nozoe suppression campaign across Jilin, Jiandao, and Tonghua provinces from October 1, 1939 to March 19, 1941, the Japanese and Manchukuo armies and police suffered 301 killed and 402 wounded (including 56 killed and 65 wounded from the Japanese Army) while claiming 1,282 abandoned 'bandit' corpses, 1,040 'bandits' surrendered, and 896 POWs.

== See also ==
- Senbu

== Sources ==
- Hsu Long-hsuen and Chang Ming-kai, History of The Sino-Japanese War (1937–1945) 2nd Ed., 1971. Translated by Wen Ha-hsiung, Chung Wu Publishing; 33, 140th Lane, Tung-hwa Street, Taipei, Taiwan Republic of China.
- Jowett, Phillip S., Rays of The Rising Sun, Armed Forces of Japan's Asian Allies 1931–45, Volume I: China & Manchuria, 2004. Helion & Co. Ltd., 26 Willow Rd., Solihull, West Midlands, England.
- 中国抗日战争正面战场作战记 (China's Anti-Japanese War Combat Operations)
  - Guo Rugui, editor-in-chief Huang Yuzhang
  - Jiangsu People's Publishing House
  - Date published : 2005–7–1
  - ISBN 7-214-03034-9
  - Online in Chinese: https://web.archive.org/web/20070528050259/http://www.wehoo.net/book/wlwh/a30012/A0170.htm%7B%7BDead link Fixed|date=August 2017}}
    - 第二部分：从“九一八”事变到西安事变 辽宁义勇军的抗日斗争 1
    - Second part: From "9/18" emergency to Xi'an Incident The Liaoning volunteers' opposition to Japan struggles
    - 第二部分：从“九一八”事变到西安事变吉林义勇军的抗日斗争 1
    - Second part: From "9/18" emergency to Xi'an Incident The Jilin volunteers' opposition to Japan struggles
    - 第二部分：从“九一八”事变到西安事变 黑龙江义勇军的抗日斗争 1
    - Second part: From "9/18" emergency to Xi'an Incident Heilongjiang volunteers' opposition to Japan struggle
    - 第二部分：从“九一八”事变到西安事变东北义勇军抗日斗争简析 1
    - Second part: From "9/18" emergency to Xi'an Incident Northeast Righteous and Brave Army opposition to Japan struggles analysis
- Coogan, Anthony (July 1993). "The volunteer armies of Northeast China". History Today. Vol. 43, no. 7. pp. 36–41. Archived from the original on 2012-10-18 – via Questia.
- "The Magistrate", Notes On A Guerrilla Campaign, from http://www.democraticunderground.com, 06/28/2003, accessed December 20, 2006
