= Li Yanlu =

Chinese general

Li Yanlu (simplified Chinese: 李延禄; traditional Chinese: 李延祿; pinyin: Lǐ Yánlù; 1895 – 1985), soldier, communist, and leader of anti-Japanese forces in Manchuria. Li was born in Yenchi, Kirin (now Jilin) Province, in April 1895. He became involved in the opposition to Yuan Shikai's attempt to restore the monarchy. He joined the Fengtian Army in 1917, as a private soldier and rose to platoon leader, then captain over the next sixteen years. Politically, he moved to the left and in July 1931, he joined the Chinese Communist Party (CCP). Three months later, the Japanese began the Mukden Incident and invasion of Manchuria. Avoiding capture and internment by the Japanese, he joined the volunteer army of Wang Delin. There, Communists were welcomed and Li and Zhou Baozhong were made high-ranking officers. Li became the chief of staff of Wang's Chinese People's National Salvation Army, one of the most successful of the volunteer armies resisting the Japanese and its puppet state of Manchukuo. He was also said to have been secretly organizing communists within the army. Yet CCP policy at the time opposed the volunteer armies and the participation of members in them and had their own Northeastern People's Revolutionary Army. At first, the CCP severely criticised their conduct yet the stance of the party prevented the growth of their own forces and did not help the anti-Japanese cause.

In 1933, when Wang was defeated by the Japanese and fled Manchuria, Li remained with the remnant NSA forces, now dispersed in small guerrilla bands. There he organized a unit from former NSA troops for the Northeastern People's Revolutionary Army in the Ning'an area and continued the struggle against the Japanese. In 1934, there were still resistance forces estimated at 50,000 men still in the field. All the CCP units were reorganized into the single Northeast Anti-Japanese United Army, with Zhao Shangzhi as its Commander-in-Chief. It was now to be open to all who wanted to resist the Japanese invasion and proclaimed its willingness to ally with all other anti-Japanese forces. This won over some of the shanlin bands, including former NSA units.

In 1935, when the CCP officially changed policy and began creating a united front, the army welcomed and absorbed most of the remaining anti-Japanese forces in Manchuria. The army was now organized into three Route Armies including Zhou Baozhong's 2nd Route Army in Kirin Province, where Li was an officer.

From the fall of 1936 to 1938, Li was sent to Shanghai and Nanjing to engage in Anti-Japanese United Front work. In 1939, was appointed to the Central Committee of the CCP Northeast Working Committee as a vice-president. He was responsible for training the cadre to be sent to operate in the Northeast. After the victory in the Sino-Japanese War, he was made vice governor of Sungkiang province in Manchuria.

After the People's Republic of China had been established, he was appointed to Heilongjiang Province as assistant deputy governor and was the province Political Consultative Conference vice-president. He died after an illness in 1985, after he composed his revolutionary reminiscences of CCP history.
