= Li Zhaolin =

Chinese general

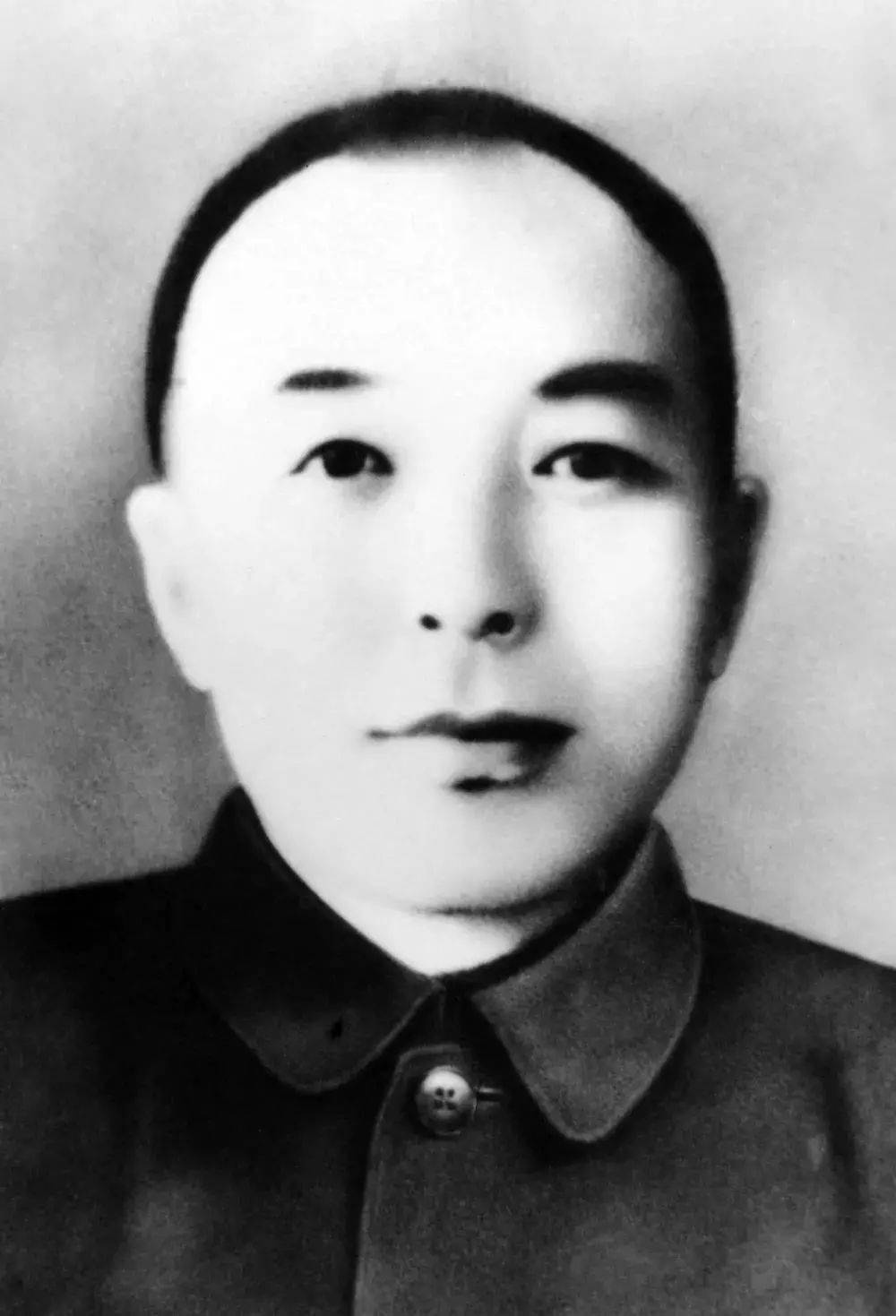
Li Zhaolin

Li Zhaolin (Chinese: 李兆麟; pinyin: Lǐ Zhàolín; November 2, 1910 – March 9, 1946), known earlier as Li Chaolan (simplified Chinese: 李超兰; traditional Chinese: 李超蘭; pinyin: Lǐ Chāolán), was the founder and leader of the 3rd Route Army, a division of the Northeast Anti-Japanese United Army in the Second Sino-Japanese War.

Li was born in Liaoyang county, Liaoning Province. After the Mukden Incident, he joined the Anti-Japanese National Salvation movement in Beijing. He later returned to organize his hometown volunteers against Japan. In May 1932 Li joined the Youth League and in the fall of 1932 he joined the Chinese Communist Party (CCP) and was engaged in to the Benxi coal mine labor movement.

In December 1932 with the Japanese defeating the Anti Japanese Volunteer Armies, Lu came to Harbin to direct the military actions of the local party organization. By November 1933, Li went to Zhuhe county to lead its guerrilla forces as deputy commander and political officer under Zhao Shangzhi. By 6 June 1934 he became director of the Political Department of the Northeast Anti-Japanese United Army, and director of the General Political Department of the anti-Japanese forces in and around Heilongjiang. In the next few years with Zhao Shangzhi and Li Yanlu made coordinated raids and attacked and occupied Linkou for a time, and founded the Tangyuan guerrilla base in the lower Songhua River. In May 1939, Li assumed the command of the 3rd Route Army of the Northeast Anti-Japanese United Army. He then carried out guerrilla war in the Songnen Plain against the Japanese, and overran Nehe, Keshan, Zhaoyuan and other counties.

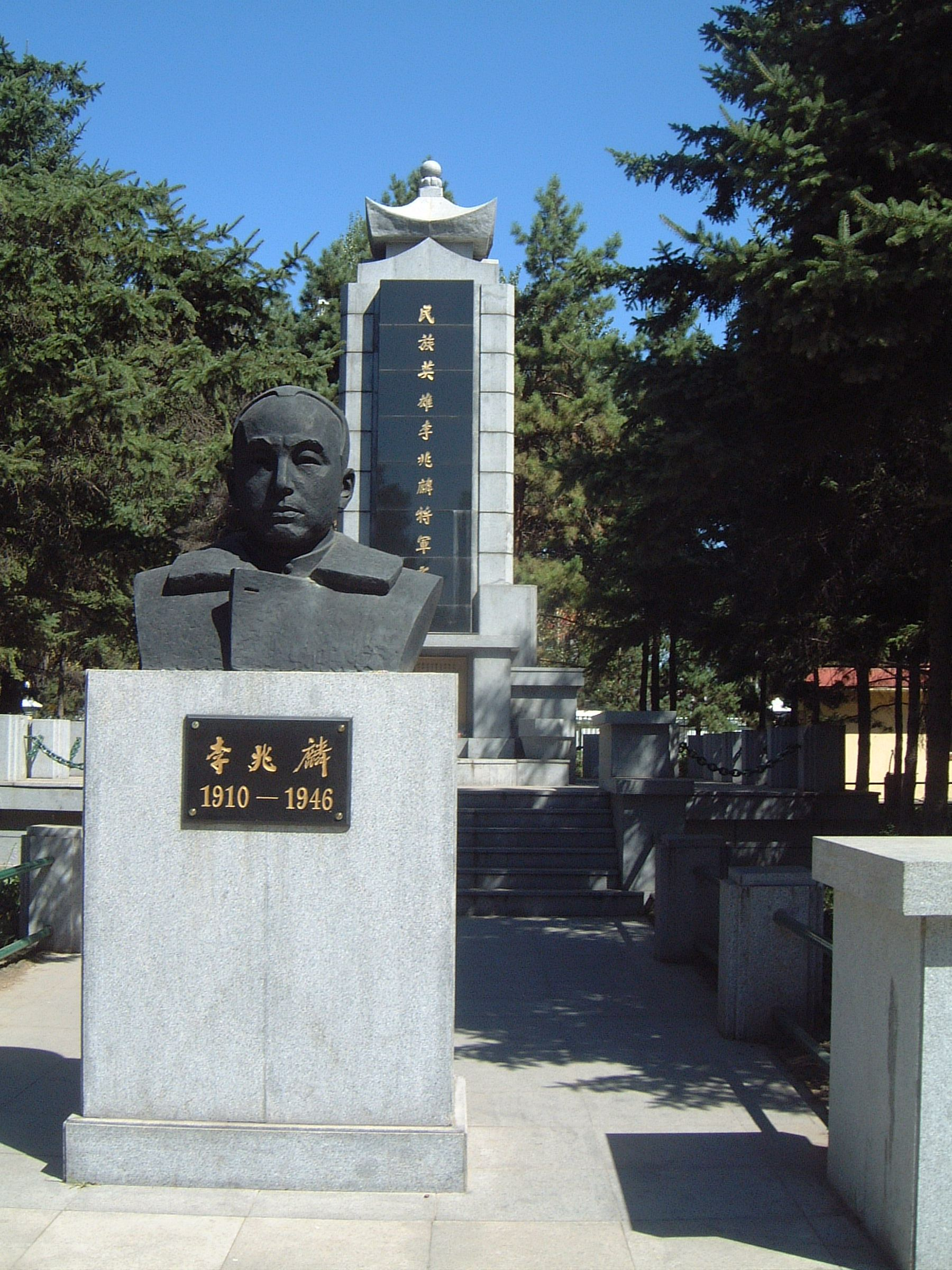
Statue of Li Zhaolin, Harbin

By the end of 1940, the resistance forces were in an extremely difficulty situation and had suffered serious setbacks. By November 1941 Li was forced to withdraw into the Soviet Union and for the rest of the war cooperated with Soviet Red Army. There, Li Zhaolin received the rank of Major and was assigned the post of Deputy Commander in the 88th Separate Rifle Brigade. In 1945 he returned to Northeast China to Harbin with the liberating Soviet army. He became the Vice Commander of the Harbin Garrison Headquarters, and Party Secretary of the Songhua-jiang zone, Vice Chairman of Binjiang province, Chairman of the Sino-Soviet Friendship Association. On 9 March 1946, Li was killed in Harbin by Kuomintang agents. To commemorate him, Harbin changed the name the Lam Kam Road Park to Zhaolin Park. He has a large memorial tomb, depicted on the stamps issued by the North East People's Post on 9 March 1948 to commemorated the second anniversary of his death.
