= Li Hai-ching =

Li Hai-ching (Chinese: 李海青; pinyin: Lǐ Hǎiqīng; also Li Hai-Tsing; 1895 – August 1937) was the leader of about 10,000 Anti-Japanese guerrilla troops in the south of Kirin, now Heilongjiang province, resisting the pacification of Manchukuo. They called themselves Anti-Japanese Army For The Salvation Of The Country and were described as being equipped with light artillery and numerous machine guns. Li established his headquarters at Fuyu and were in control of the territory there and southward as far as Nong’an.

On 29 March 1932 his forces defeated regular troops of the Manchukuoan Governor Xi Qia outside the town of Nong′an, only 55 km from the Manchukuoan capital of Xinjing. Nong′an was soon reported on the verge of surrender. Small Japanese detachments sent from Xinjing radioed for help, after suffering heavy casualties in the fighting. Japanese forces from the east at Yao-men, tried to fight their way through to Nong′an with the support of bombers but the defenders radio ceased broadcasting, Li's forces having captured the town.

In another action in late April, 100 km south of Harbin on the Chinese Eastern Railway, 3,000 Chinese soldiers under General Li Hai-tsing, ripped up the railway tracks and tore down telegraph wires. They then waited until a train from Harbin arrived, looted it and dispersed before the arrival of Japanese troops that were rushed to scene.

In May 1932 the Japanese Li Hai-ching Subjugation Operation defeated and dispersed Li's army. Reformed again in October his guerrilla force, reduced to 3,000 men again tried to attack the Manchukuoan and Japanese forces in southern Heilongjiang province. They were defeated and were forced to retreat into Jehol.

== Sources ==
- Jowett, Phillip S., Rays of The Rising Sun, Armed Forces of Japan’s Asian Allies 1931-45, Volume I: China & Manchuria, 2004. Helion & Co. Ltd., 26 Willow Rd., Solihull, West Midlands, England.
- Wisconsin Rapids Daily Tribune Tuesday, March 29, 1932
- May 2, 1932 TIME "Earthly Paradise"
