= Zhang Haitian =

Zhang Haitian (simplified Chinese: 张海天; traditional Chinese: 張海天; pinyin: Zhāng Hǎitiān; 1888 – 1939), known as Lao Beifeng (simplified Chinese: 老北风; traditional Chinese: 老北風; pinyin: Lǎo Běifēng; lit. 'Old North Wind'; also Lao Pie-fang), was a guerrilla leader fighting in western Liaoning against Japanese occupation. He led several thousand followers to attack Japanese garrisons in the southern portion of the South Manchurian Railroad mainline in early 1932, during the pacification of Manchukuo.

The Japanese garrison of Newchwangchen was encircled and attacked while other troops under his orders attacked in the Haicheng area. Japanese reinforcements quickly dispatched from Mukden forced Zhang's retirement, but Zhang Haitian emerged as an Anti-Japanese Volunteer Army general and was acclaimed as commander by the local bands of the brotherhoods and citizen militias.

== See also ==
- Japanese invasion of Manchuria

== Sources ==
- Coogan, Anthony (July 1993). "The volunteer armies of Northeast China". History Today. Vol. 43, no. 7. pp. 36–41. Archived from the original on 2012-10-18 – via Questia.
- Notes On A Guerrilla Campaign, from http://www.democraticunderground.com accessed November 4, 2006
