= Wang Fengge =

Chinese general

Wang Fengge (simplified Chinese: 王凤阁; traditional Chinese: 王豐閣; pinyin: Wáng Fènggé; 1895 – 1937) was born in Tonghua, Jilin, China. In 1914 Wang Fengge graduated from the Donghua Normal School, and had studied traditional martial arts as a young man. In 1922 he was made a company commander in a brigade of the Northeast Army. In 1926 he retired from the army, going into business, and became involved in the Big Swords Society.

After the Japanese invasion of Manchuria, he raised a volunteer force by linking up with other citizens in the Linjiang and Ji'an areas during late 1931 and announced the establishment of his army—the Northeastern Volunteer Righteous and Brave Fighters—in March 1932.

In April, 1932 Tang Juwu revolted in Huanren, establishing the Liaoning Self-Defense Corps. Wang Fengge's unit and other groups of Big Swords became part of Tang Juwu's force. On May 7, 1932, Wang led his force and with Commander Fang Chun of the Huinan anti- Japanese force jointly attacked and occupied the Liuho county seat, and proclaimed the revolt against Japan in a circular telegram. Wang's unit of 1,000 men, suddenly increased to 5,000, and he organized them into six brigades.

By the end of February 1933, most of the large volunteer armies had fled to the Soviet Union, from where they were eventually repatriated. However Wang did not flee and fought on in a guerrilla unit, and continued to harass the Japanese and Manchukuoan forces for many years in Liaoning. Wang Fengge was captured in 1937 after a three-day battle and was then executed, along with his wife and child.

== Sources ==
- Wang Fengge
- "The volunteer armies of northeast China". Archived from the original on 2011-06-04 – via Questia.
