= Ma Zhanshan =

Chinese general and politician (1885–1950)

Ma Zhanshan 馬占山
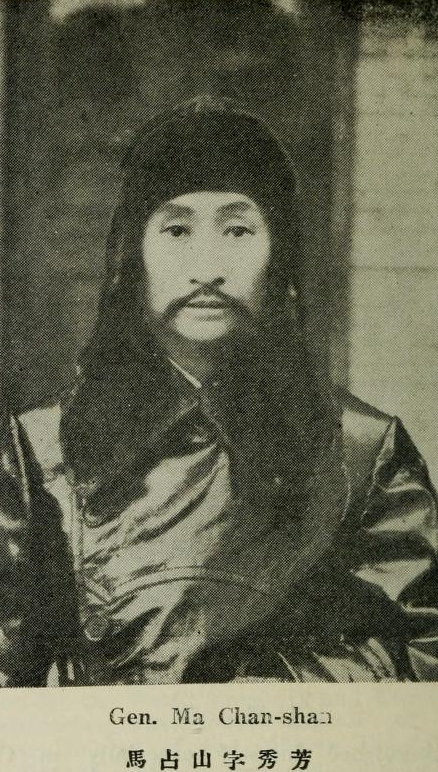

Minister of Defense of Manchukuo
- In office 9 March 1932 – 7 April 1932
- Preceded by: Position established
- Succeeded by: Zhang Jinghui

Governor of Heilongjiang
- In office 1940–1945
- Succeeded by: Han Junjie
- Acting; 20 October 1931 – 1933
- Preceded by: Wan Fulin

Personal details
- Born: 30 November 1885 Huaide (Gongzhuling), Jilin, Qing dynasty
- Died: 29 November 1950 (aged 64) Beijing, People's Republic of China
- Party: Kuomintang
- Relations: Ma Zhiwei (grandson)
- Awards: Order of Blue Sky and White Sun

Military service
- Allegiance: China; Manchukuo (1932)
- Branch/service: Northeastern Army; Manchukuo Imperial Army (1932); Northeast Anti-Japanese National Salvation Army; National Revolutionary Army
- Years of service: 1913–1950
- Rank: General
- Battles/wars: Japanese invasion of Manchuria; Mukden Incident; Second Sino-Japanese War; Pacification of Manchukuo; Chinese Civil War

Ma Zhanshan (simplified Chinese: 马占山; traditional Chinese: 馬占山; pinyin: Mǎ Zhànshān; Wade–Giles: Ma^{³} Chan^{⁴}-shan^{¹}; courtesy name Xiufang (秀芳; Xiùfāng); 30 November 1885 – 29 November 1950) was a Chinese general who became a national hero for resisting the Japanese invasion of Manchuria in 1931. A former bandit who rose through the cavalry of the Fengtian clique, he was acting chairman of Heilongjiang province when he fought the Kwantung Army at the Nen River bridge in November 1931, a battle that Chinese official histories regard as the first shot of armed resistance to the invasion.

After his defeat, Ma went over to the Japanese and became Minister of War of Manchukuo in March 1932, but within a month he fled to Heihe, renounced the new state and resumed the fight with volunteer forces. Chinese accounts describe the defection as a ruse, while the American press reported that he had accepted a large Japanese bribe. Driven into the Soviet Union in December 1932, he returned to China through Europe in 1933.

During the Second Sino-Japanese War, Ma commanded the Northeast Advance Army in Suiyuan and northern Shaanxi, and he served as the chairman of Heilongjiang in exile. He signed the declaration of the Xi'an Incident in 1936, and in 1949 he helped persuade Fu Zuoyi to hand over Peiping peacefully to the Communists. He died in Beijing in 1950 and is honoured in the People's Republic of China as a national hero.

== Early life ==
Ma was born on 30 November 1885 in Tanyao village near Maojiacheng, in Huaide County of Fengtian, in present-day Gongzhuling, Jilin. He came from a poor peasant family whose ancestral home was Fengrun in Zhili, and his grandfather had moved to the northeast during the Jiaqing era. In his biography of Ma, his grandson Ma Zhiwei describes the family as Han Chinese, but official profiles of Ma Zhiwei give his own ethnicity as Manchu.

As a boy, Ma herded horses for landlords and became a skilled rider and marksman. At the age of 18, he was accused of losing a horse in his care and fled to become a bandit at Heihu Mountain, where he soon led a band of his own. After the Russo-Japanese War, he accepted a Qing amnesty, and his band was taken into the local forces. In 1911, Wu Junsheng, commander of the Fengtian rear-route patrol battalions, promoted him to platoon leader, and Ma served under Wu for the rest of Wu's career.

== Fengtian Army ==
In 1913, after Wu's force became the 2nd Cavalry Brigade of the central army, Ma became a company commander in its 3rd Regiment with the rank of major. In 1916, he fought the forces of the Mongol leader Babojab, who was trying to found a Manchu–Mongol state with Japanese support, and he was promoted to battalion commander. He followed Wu to Heilongjiang in 1918 as a cavalry regiment commander, and in 1925 he became commander of the 5th Brigade of the Northeastern Army's 17th Division. During the revolt of Guo Songling against Zhang Zuolin in late 1925, Ma's troops defeated Guo's forces and captured Guo and his wife, who were shot on Zhang's orders. He then commanded the 17th Cavalry Division and later the 2nd Cavalry Army.

After Zhang Zuolin and Wu Junsheng were killed in the Huanggutun incident in June 1928, Ma became bandit-suppression commander of Heilongjiang, and in 1929 he became its cavalry commander-in-chief. In 1930, he was appointed commander of the province's 3rd Infantry Brigade and garrison commander of Heihe.

== Resistance in Heilongjiang ==
=== Acting chairman ===
After the Mukden Incident of 18 September 1931, the Kwantung Army quickly occupied Liaoning and Jilin. The Heilongjiang chairman Wan Fulin was in Peiping, and on 10 October Zhang Xueliang appointed Ma as acting chairman of the province and commander of its forces. Ma reached the provincial capital Qiqihar on the night of 19 October and took office the next day. He announced that he would defend the province, rejected officials who favoured surrender, and offered a reward for the head of the collaborationist general Zhang Haipeng, whose troops were advancing on the province with Japanese backing.

=== Nen River bridge ===
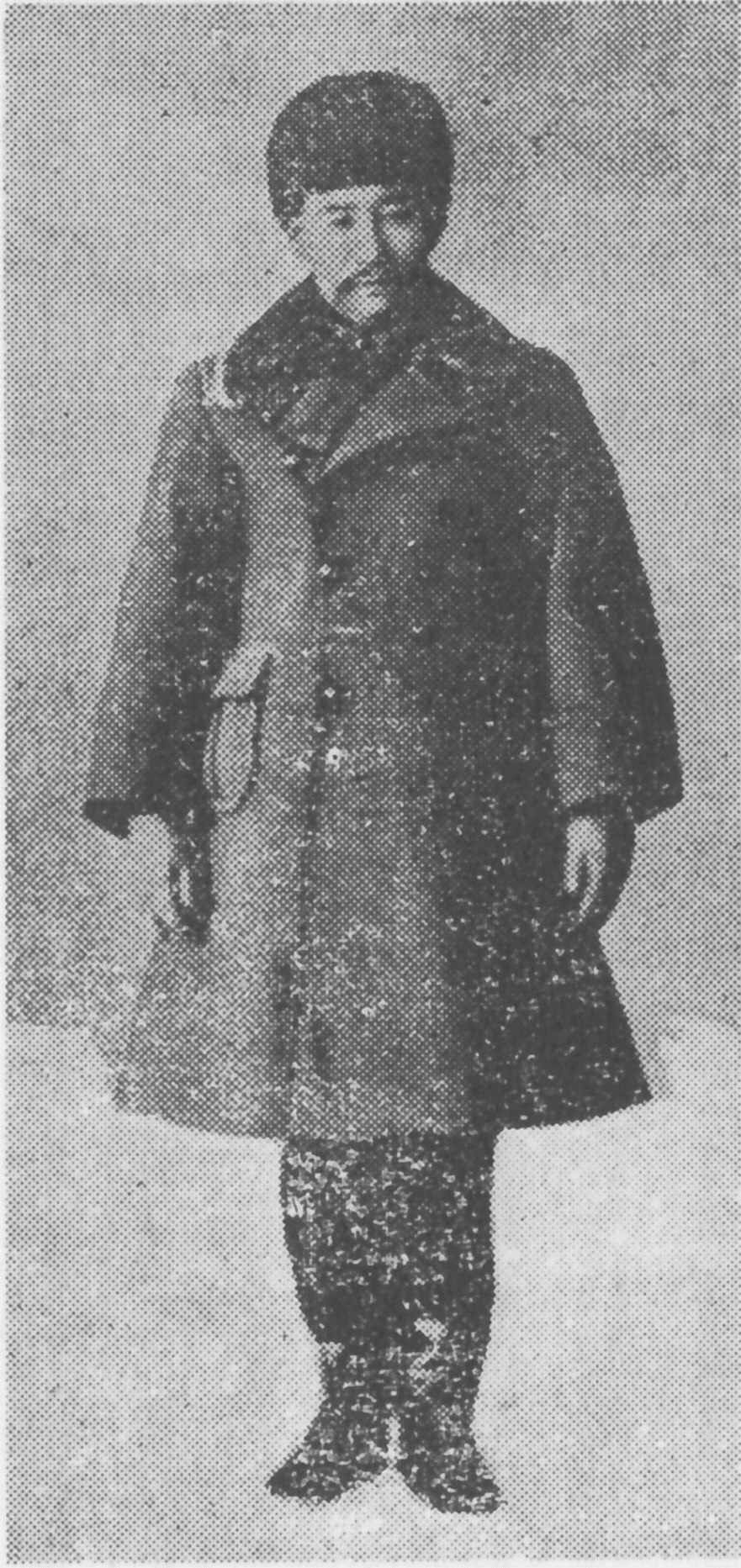
Ma Zhanshan in 1931

The railway bridge over the Nen River at Jiangqiao was the main route to Qiqihar, and Ma's forces burned its deck and destroyed three of its spans to block the advance. Ma refused Japanese demands to repair the bridge and to withdraw his troops from it. On 4 November 1931, about 4,000 Japanese troops with aircraft, artillery and armoured vehicles attacked the bridge, which began the Jiangqiao campaign. The American minister Nelson T. Johnson passed on a Chinese report that Japanese soldiers had fired first and had been driven back, and he believed it to be substantially correct.

Ma's cavalry repeatedly charged the exposed Japanese flank, but his forces were slowly pushed back towards Qiqihar. Time reported that he had lost more than 400 killed and 300 wounded since 5 November, while Xinhua later put Japanese losses at more than 1,000. Ma denied receiving Soviet aid, and Johnson found no evidence of it. On 15 November, the Kwantung Army commander Shigeru Honjō sent Ma an ultimatum, which he did not answer in writing. On 18 November, the Japanese opened a general offensive with heavy artillery and bombing, and Ma radioed Chiang Kai-shek to ask for an appeal to the League of Nations. Short of ammunition and without reinforcements, he withdrew that day, and the Japanese occupied Qiqihar on 19 November. According to Time, he had only 23,000 men and no effective artillery against the division of Lieutenant General Jirō Tamon.

The resistance made Ma a national hero. Messages and donations came from across China and from Chinese abroad, including $2,000 cabled by a Chinese merchants' association in Newark, New Jersey. A Shanghai tobacco company produced Ma Zhanshan-brand cigarettes and gave part of the proceeds to anti-Japanese funds. On 17 November, the Kuomintang's Fourth Plenary Session formally appointed him chairman of Heilongjiang.

=== Hailun ===
Ma moved his government to Hailun, where he reorganised his forces. He rejected approaches from Zhang Jinghui, who urged him to come to terms with the Japanese. He appealed to the National Government for help, but he received no troops or supplies from Nanjing.

== Manchukuo ==
After Harbin fell to the Japanese on 5 February 1932, Ma opened talks with them. According to his own later account, Japanese emissaries pressed him to return to Qiqihar and promised that their forces would withdraw. On 17 February, he attended the conference in Mukden with Zhang Jinghui, Zang Shiyi and Xi Qia that prepared the founding of Manchukuo, and on the same day he became a member of a Japanese-sponsored administrative committee for the northeastern provinces. Ma later said that he had proposed at the conference that the new government be abolished, and that he had refused to sign an agreement mortgaging the Hulan–Hailun railway to the Japanese. He did not sign the declaration of independence, citing illness.

Ma became governor of Heilongjiang under the new regime, and on 9 March 1932 he became Minister of War of Manchukuo. He attended the inauguration of Puyi at Changchun, which he later said he had done under Japanese pressure. Japanese advisers insisted on approving all provincial business, and Ma delayed handing posts to Japanese officials. Time reported that he had accepted a bribe of $3 million in gold to join Manchukuo. Chinese accounts describe his surrender as a ruse to gain time and resources, and they state that he took large sums of provincial and railway funds, together with vehicles and horses, before he left.

On 1 April 1932, Ma left Qiqihar on the pretext of an inspection tour. On 7 April, he reached Heihe, where he restored the Chinese provincial government of Heilongjiang and renounced Manchukuo. A New Zealand newspaper report later claimed that insurgents had threatened to execute his family at Heihe unless he joined them. In a statement to the Chinese delegation at Geneva, Ma said that his Manchukuo appointments had been illegal, described Japanese control over Manchurian officials, and asked the League's commission of inquiry to investigate.

== Second resistance ==
In May 1932, Ma led the Heilongjiang National Salvation Army, which had been formed from local militia and volunteer forces, in an advance on Harbin. The offensive failed after his former subordinate Cheng Zhiyuan went over to the Japanese, and the Japanese took Hailun on 3 June. In July, the Japanese 8th and 14th Divisions surrounded his forces, and Ma escaped into the mountains with only a few men. His aide Han Jialin, who resembled him, was killed, and the Japanese announced that Ma was dead. Western newspapers reported that his body had been found clutching a revolver, but American diplomats later reported that the claim was unfounded. According to Time, the Japanese sent what they believed to be his uniform and medals to Emperor Hirohito. The China Weekly Review mocked the persistence of the Japanese reports of his death.

According to the historian Jonathan Fenby, Ma's guerrillas raided the Manchukuo treasury, attacked Changchun and seized six Japanese aircraft. In September 1932, Ma reached Longmen County and joined forces with Su Bingwen. An attack on Qiqihar in October failed, and in December the Japanese drove Su's forces and then Ma's across the border into the Soviet Union.

== Return to China ==
In April 1933, Ma visited Moscow with the Chinese ambassador Yan Huiqing, and he then travelled through Poland, Germany and Italy. Time reported his arrival in Berlin with about 60 Chinese on a train provided by the Soviet government. His troops in the Soviet Union were sent back to China through Xinjiang, and Ma reached Shanghai by way of Hong Kong on 6 June 1933. Chiang Kai-shek appointed him a member of the Military Affairs Commission but gave him no troops, and Ma settled in Tianjin, where he survived Japanese plots to kill him. In 1936, he received the rank of lieutenant general.

In Tianjin, Ma met the underground Communist Sun Dasheng through Du Zhongyuan in October 1935, and he promised to urge Zhang Xueliang to end the civil war against the Communists. In December 1936, he was in Xi'an when Zhang and Yang Hucheng detained Chiang in the Xi'an Incident, and he signed their eight-point declaration. Zhang appointed him commander of a cavalry force to aid Suiyuan, but the appointment lapsed after Zhang himself was detained, and Ma returned to Tianjin on 29 December.

== Second Sino-Japanese War ==
After the Second Sino-Japanese War broke out in July 1937, Ma was appointed commander of the Northeast Advance Army on 21 August. He set up his headquarters at Datong on 24 August, and he enlisted former puppet Mongol troops into his force. In October 1937, he fought east of Guisui, the capital of Suiyuan, and then he retreated to Baotou and Wuyuan. In the spring of 1938, he raided Japanese positions along the Yellow River and the Yin Mountains, and in May he crossed the river to Halazhai in Fugu County, Shaanxi, which remained his base for seven years.

In 1938, Ma's right hand was badly injured when his hunting gun exploded near Yan'an, and he was treated in a hospital there. Mao Zedong visited him, and at a welcome rally he praised Ma for fighting at the front despite his age. Several Communists held posts in Ma's army, including the ordnance officer Zou Dapeng and the chief secretary Li Youwen.

On 3 May 1940, the National Government appointed Ma chairman of Heilongjiang, and the provincial government in exile was set up at Yulin on 4 August 1941. A British Foreign Office profile from the war years described him as a good cavalryman and an expert shot, but as an old-style "bandit" general with no education or modern military knowledge. In 1940, Time reported that the Japanese had sent a force across the Ordos to kill him. He later became deputy commander of the 12th War Zone. At Halazhai, he built schools, a library, an orphanage and a shrine to soldiers killed in the war, and he enforced strict discipline on his troops.

== Chinese Civil War ==
After Japan's surrender, Ma became a member of the Northeast Headquarters of the Military Affairs Commission. In September 1945, his troops were sent with Fu Zuoyi's forces against Communist-held areas, and they were defeated at Chaigoubao. On 23 September 1946, Ma became deputy commander of the Northeast Headquarters. He placed his two cavalry brigades under Fu Zuoyi's command and stayed in Peiping, citing illness, until he went to Shenyang on 17 April 1947. He had no real power in the northeast, and in late October 1948 he flew back to Peiping.

During the Pingjin campaign, Ma refused to leave for the south. Through his friend Cai Yunsheng and the professor Wang Zhixiang, he was asked to help persuade Fu Zuoyi, his sworn brother, to hand over the city peacefully. Ma suggested bringing Deng Baoshan to Peiping, and Deng's talks helped convince Fu to negotiate with the Communists. In January 1949, Ma, Fu and Deng accepted the Communist terms for the peaceful handover of Peiping.

== Death ==
Mao invited Ma to the second session of the first National Committee of the Chinese People's Political Consultative Conference in June 1950, but he was too ill with cancer to attend. In his will, he wrote that his ideal of a new China had been realised under Mao and the Communist Party. He died at his home in Beijing on 29 November 1950, and he was buried at Wan'an Cemetery on 7 December. The CPPCC and the Government Administration Council sent wreaths, and the vice chairman of the Central People's Government Li Jishen escorted his coffin.

== Assessments ==
In 1931, Time called Ma "Hero Ma", and in 1933 it noted that he had offered the only serious resistance to the Japanese invasion before he fled and joined Manchukuo. The educator Tao Xingzhi praised his stand at the Nen River in a poem and an essay. Fan Yinfei, writing in a 1988 collection of biographies of Republican generals, described Ma as a man who rose from banditry in the Fengtian army and became a famous anti-Japanese general by defying Chiang's policy of non-resistance.

In the People's Republic, Ma is honoured as a national hero. His grandson Ma Zhiwei, a standing committee member of the CPPCC National Committee, has written about his grandfather's links with the Communists. The historian Yang Jiahong has disputed the view that Ma fired the first shot of the resistance, arguing that another unit had fought first and that fighting at the bridge had begun before Ma took office. A statue of Ma stands in the Jiangqiao Resistance Memorial Park in Tailai County, and its museum receives more than 100,000 visitors a year.

== Personal life ==
Ma married Du Zanyi, who had been taken in by his family as a child bride, and she died at Hailun in 1929. He also took four concubines, and according to Fan Yinfei he became addicted to opium. In 1940, Time described him as about 5 ft 8 in (173 cm) tall, thin and nervous, and wrote that he smoked a little opium. His children included his son Ma Kui and his daughter Ma Yuwen.

== Awards and honours ==
- Order of the Precious Tripod, third class
- Order of Brilliant Star, second class
- Order of Blue Sky and White Sun (1 January 1946)
- Medal of Victory in the War of Resistance

== See also ==
- Defense of Harbin
- Pacification of Manchukuo
- Statue of Ma Zhanshan, Shanghai
