= Northeast Anti-Japanese National Salvation Army =

- Simplified Chinese: 东北救国抗日联军
- Traditional Chinese: 東北救國抗日聯軍
Transcriptions
Standard Mandarin
- Hanyu Pinyin: Dōngběi Jiùguó Kàngrì Liánjūn

Ma Zhanshan, a general in the Chinese Army who had surrendered in January 1932 and joined the Manchukuo regime, rebelled again in late April, forming his own volunteer army in Heilongjiang province at the beginning of May, and then he established another 11 troops of volunteers at Buxi, Gannan, Keshan, Kedong, and other places and thus established the Northeast Counter-Japanese National Salvation Army with Ma appointed as Commander-in-Chief, with the other volunteer armies as subordinates, at least in name.

== See also ==
- Japanese invasion of Manchuria
- Second Sino-Japanese War

== Sources ==
- Coogan, Anthony (July 1993). "The volunteer armies of Northeast China". History Today. Vol. 43, no. 7. pp. 36–41. Archived from the original on 2012-10-18 – via Questia.
- Notes On A Guerrilla Campaign, from http://www.democraticunderground.com accessed November 4, 2006
