= Xi Qia =

Chinese general (1883–1950)

Xiqia
- 熙洽
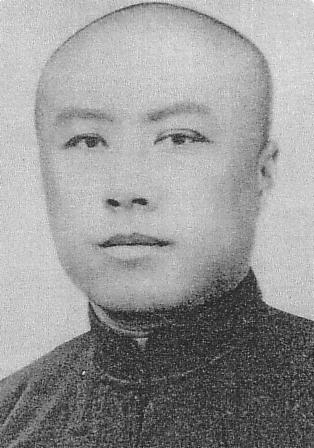
- Xi Qia as a member of the Manchukuo Cabinet

Minister of the Imperial Household of Manchukuo
- In office 21 May 1935 – April 1945
- Monarch: Kangde
- Preceded by: Shen Ruiling

Minister of Finance of Manchukuo
- In office 9 March 1932 – 21 May 1935
- Prime Minister: Zheng Xiaoxu
- Succeeded by: Sun Qichang

Personal details
- Born: 18 October 1883 Shenyang, Liaoning, Qing China
- Died: 1950 (aged 66–67) Fushun, Liaoning, People's Republic of China
- Citizenship: Manchukuo
- Education: Imperial Japanese Army Academy

Military service
- Allegiance: Qing Dynasty (Republic of China (1912–1949)) Republic of China; Manchukuo
- Unit: Provincial Army of Jilin Province

Xi Qia
- Other names: Hsi Ch'ia, Hsi Hsia, Xi Xia

Xi Qia or Xi Xia (Hsi Hsia; Chinese: 熙洽; pinyin: Xīqià; Wade–Giles: Hsi^{1}-hsia^{4}; Hepburn: Ki Kō; 1883–1950) was a general in command of the Jilin Provincial Army of the Republic of China, who defected to the Japanese during the Invasion of Manchuria in 1931, and who subsequently served as a cabinet minister in Manchukuo.

== Biography ==
Xi Qia was an ethnic Manchu (Plain Blue Banner) of the imperial clan of Aisin Gioro as a direct descendant of Murhaci (穆爾哈齊), a younger half-brother of Nurhaci and second son of Taksi, thus, making him a member of the collateral bloodline of the Aisin Gioro clan. He contributed to making and a supporter of efforts to create a new Manchu-dominated state in Manchuria after the Xinhai Revolution overthrew the Qing dynasty in China. As a youth, he studied in Japan at the Tokyo Shimbu Gakko, a military preparatory school for Chinese students, followed by the Imperial Japanese Army Academy. He rose to the rank of lieutenant general and commanding officer of the Provincial Army of Jilin Province under the Fengtian clique.

On 23 September 1931, after the Mukden Incident, Xi Qia, was invited by the Japanese government to form a government for Jilin Province. The Imperial Japanese Army succeeded in achieving a bloodless occupation of the capital, Jilin city. General Xi Qia called a meeting of government organizations and Japanese advisers, and on 30 September 1931 issued a proclamation declaring Jilin Province to be independent of the Republic of China, with himself as head of a provisional government.

After the Japanese Kwantung Army completed military control over southern Manchuria in early January 1932, occupying Jinzhou and Shanhaiguan, it turned to the north to secure the remainder of Manchuria. When negotiations with Generals Ma Zhanshan and Ding Chao had come to naught, Japanese Colonel Kenji Doihara in early January 1932 requested that General Xi Qia advance with his forces to take Harbin from the last major Kuomintang force in the north led by General Ding Chao. General Xi Qia advanced to Shuangcheng on 25 January, and fighting began on the morning of the 26th. However, Xi Qia's troops soon suffered a serious reverse and Doihara was forced to call upon the Kwantung Army to assist. To justify this, Colonel Doihara created the Harbin Incident.

The Japanese 2nd Infantry Division, commanded by Lieutenant General Jiro Tamon, was ordered to go to the rescue of General Xi Qia, and entrained on 28 January. Because of transportation difficulties in the cold winter weather, it took seven days for Japanese columns to struggle north over the frozen countryside in temperatures of 30° below zero. Finally, they closed in on the Harbin from the west and south on 4 February and took the city on 5 February 1932. Within two months, the state of Manchukuo was established, and Xi Qia was confirmed by the new government as governor of Jilin Province.

A couple of months later, on 29 March 1932, Xi Qia's militia suffered another defeat, this time at the hands of the Anti-Japanese Army For The Salvation Of The Country, a Volunteer Army led by General Li Hai-ching on outside the town of Nong'an, only 35 miles from the Manchukuoan capital of Xinjing. Japanese forces from the east at Yao-men, tried to fight their way through to Nong'an with close air support from IJAAF bombers, but the defender's radio ceased broadcasting when Li's forces captured the town. Japanese regular army troops soon drove Li's forces out of Nong'an. Xi Qia was removed from command soon after his defeat and was henceforth given civilian duties.

Xi Qia became Minister of Finance of Manchukuo in 1932. He subsequently served as Imperial Household Minister from 1935. At the end of World War II, he was captured by the Soviet Red Army and held in a Siberian prison until he was extradited to the People's Republic of China in 1950, where he later died in captivity at the Fushun War Criminals Management Centre in Fushun, Liaoning Province.

== See also ==
- Manchurian nationalism
