= Shanlin =

Qing dynasty Chinese bandits

The term shanlin (Chinese: 山林; lit. 'mountain and forest') was frequently used to describe bandits in northeast China from the time of the Qing dynasty, because they knew the local wooded and mountainous terrain very well. Most operated in a fairly small district and took pains to maintain the goodwill of local peasants. As a result, government troops had great difficulty in suppressing them. After the Republic of China was founded, they often were recruited as soldiers to end their bandit career.

It was a term frequently used later for remnants of the Anti-Japanese Volunteer Armies that resisted the Japanese invasion of Northeastern China in the Second Sino-Japanese War. Some did not flee after the defeat of the armies and fought on as small guerrilla units, called shanlin.

== See also ==
- Honghuzi
