= Honghuzi =

Chinese bandits along the Russian border in the late 19th and early 20th centuries

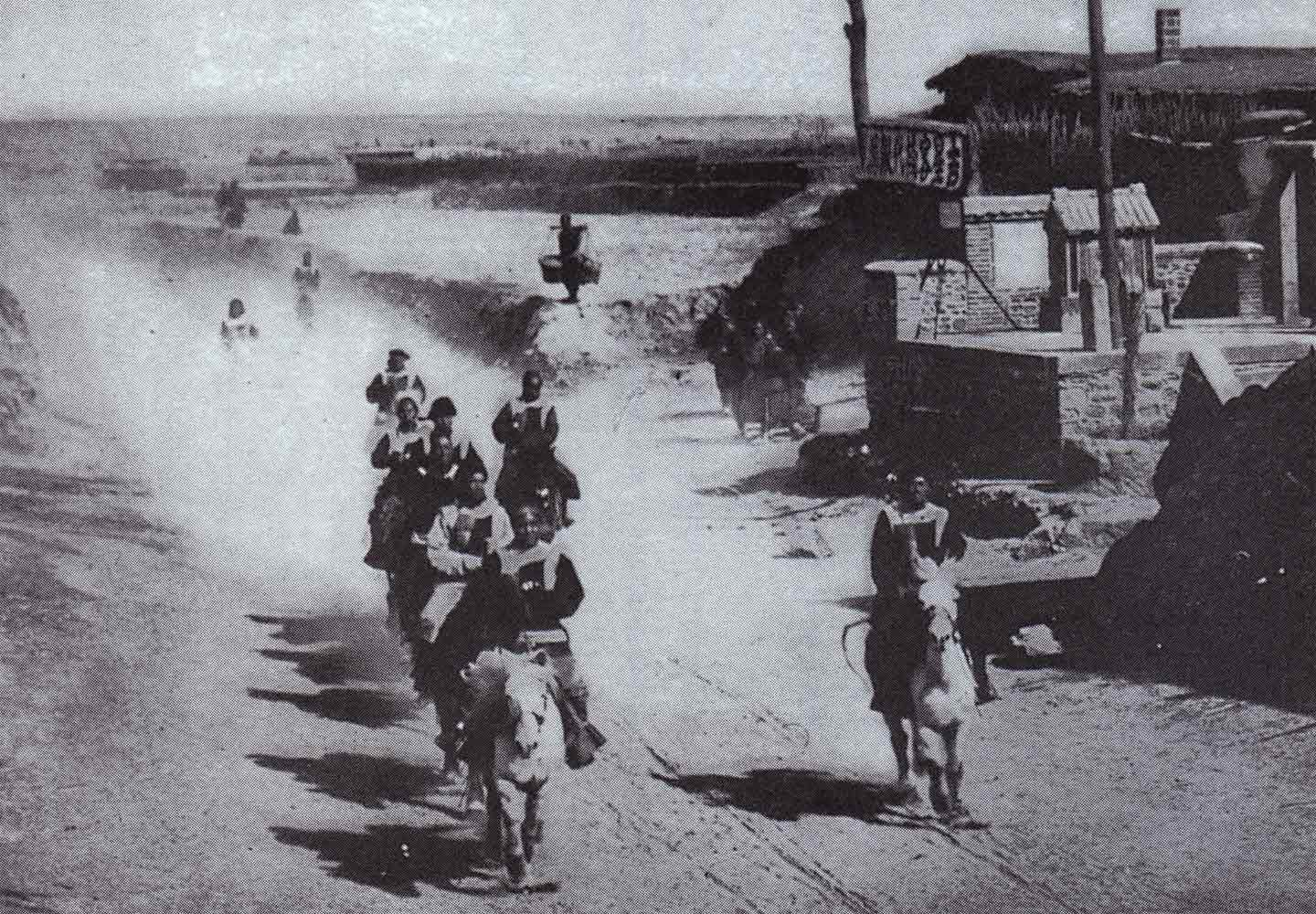
Honghuzi during the Battle of Mukden (1905)

Honghuzi (Chinese: 紅鬍子; lit. 'Red Beards') were armed Chinese robbers and bandits who operated in the areas of the eastern Russia-China borderland during the second half of the 19th century and the first half of the 20th century. Their activities extended over southeastern Siberia, the Russian Far East, and Manchuria/Northeast China. The word honghuzi has been variously transliterated as hong huzi, hunhutsi, hong hu zi, hunghutze, hun-hutze, etc. There is also a common transliteration from Russian, khunkhuzy (Russian: хунхузы), and a back-formation for the singular, khunkhuz (Russian: хунхуз). Korean immigrants to Manchuria in the 20th century called the honghuzi ma-jeok (마적,馬賊). Groups of honghuzi were recruited as guerrillas by the Imperial Japanese Army during the Russo-Japanese War of 1904-1905 into chunchu (チュンチュ) sabotage units.

== Resistance to foreign occupation ==
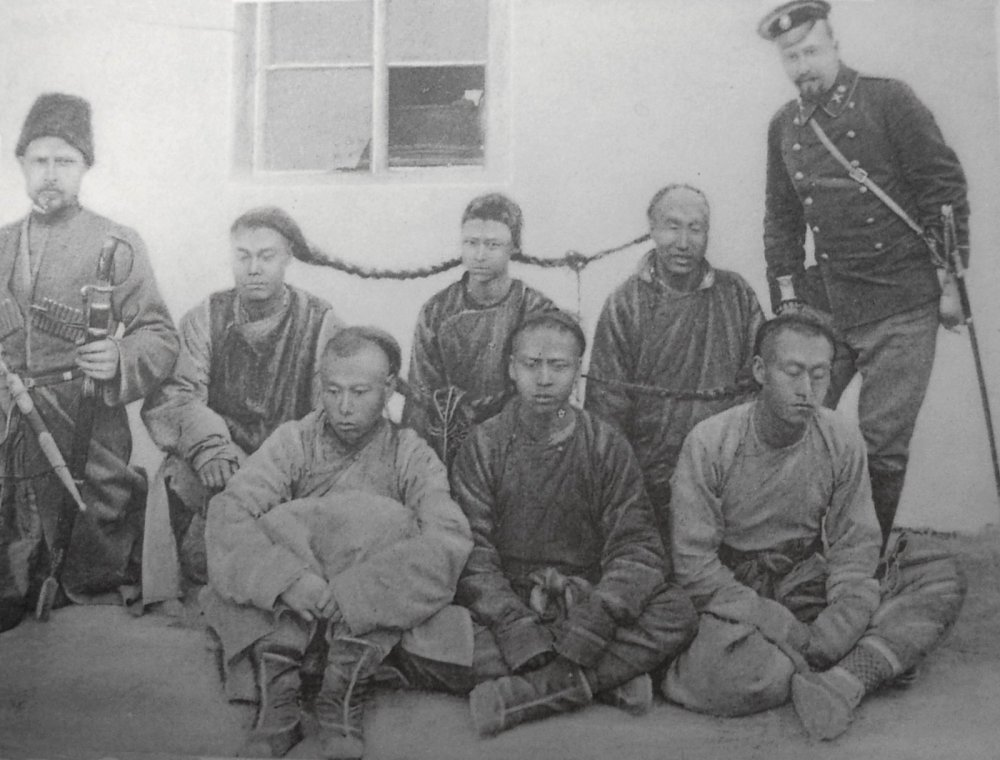
Manchurian honghuzi under arrest at Manchurian Railway. 1900s

Near the end of the 19th century the honghuzi harassed Russian efforts to build the Manchurian Railway and in general plagued the Russian troops in Manchuria. The Honghuzi participated in the Boxer Rebellion against the Eight-Nation Alliance, and after the Russian invasion of Manchuria carried on guerrilla warfare against the Russian occupation. The origin of most Honghuzi was China proper. Many Honghuzi were former Chinese soldiers or unemployed laborers.

=== Boxer Rebellion ===
Louis Livingston Seaman wrote about an incident in which the Honghuzi, who were also Boxers, ambushed, tortured and executed an Eight-Nation Alliance force consisting of Sikhs:

In January 1900, during the Boxer campaign (and the Hunghutzes were all Boxers in those days) I chanced to be on the Great Wall of China at Shan-HaiKwan, when a party of five Sikhs, with two coolies and a cart, went through a gateway on a foraging expedition for wood. Shortly after one of the coolies rushed back, so frightened he could hardly articulate, and reported that a party of mounted Hung-hutzes had swooped down on the Sikhs, who had carelessly neglected to take their arms, and had carried them off and stolen their ponies. The coolies had escaped by hiding in a nearby nullah.

It was "boots and saddles," and in less time than one can write it, the Royal Bengal Lancers, Beluchis, and Gurkas were swarming over the hills in a vain hunt for their comrades and the Boxers. But they were late. Several hours after, they came upon the scene of torture. All was over. There remained only the mutilated remains of their companions and the inhuman instrument that had accomplished its deadly work.

The death instrument was a sort of iron cage..The rods were closed round the victim much as they are round the handle of a closed umbrella, and a rudely constructed nut or screw at the top forced them tightly together. In this infernal device the unfortunate Sikhs had been forced, one after another, and as the screw was tightened and the flesh of the victim protruded between the bars, these fiends had sliced it off with their swords until the end came, and it came quickly.

The Honghuzi also participated in the battle of Blagoveshchensk, where the Russians carried out a massacre of Chinese civilians.

=== Resistance to the Russian Empire ===
Many parts of the country were infested by the Honghuzi.

The term Hong huzi itself may have originally been applied during the 1600s to the Russians by the Chinese, since it meant "red bearded". Indigenous peoples of Amur were attacked by these Russian red beards, but the name was later changed to apply to Chinese bandits only.

Honghuzi raided Russian settlers in the Far East region during the nineteenth and twentieth centuries. In one incident, the Honghuzi attacked the Heeck family, kidnapping Fridolf Heeck's son and killing his servant and wife in 1879.

The war-correspondent Douglas Story mentioned an incident where one Honghuzi killed several Russian Cossacks before succumbing to return fire: "I have seen a solitary Hunghutze, pursued by a Cossack patrol, calmly dismount from his pony and engage an entire sotnia with his solitary rifle. Kneeling in a field of kiaolang stubble, alone and unsupported, he deliberately picked off the men with his Mauser until the Russians pulled themselves sufficiently together to end his sharp-shooting with a volley."

During the Russo-Japanese War, the Honghuzi took advantage of the conflict to carry out attacks against Russian forces:

There was also at the end of February a report that a land mine had exploded at the Russian station at Hayuenkow, on the south coast of Liaotung, between the Yalu and Port Arthur. The Russians had expected the Japanese would try to land here, as it was one of their principal landing-places in the war of 1894 against China; so the place was mined, and it was said that the Hunghutze attacked the Russians in force, and managed to blow up the mine, with a loss of 200 Russian soldiers. There were numerous other outbreaks of the Hunghutze, who seem to have carried on a sort of guerrilla warfare against the Russians all the time.

Dr. Seaman observed the Chinese Honghuzi in action against the Russians during the war, as described in The Nation magazine: "He had some amusing and exciting experiences with the Hung-hutzes (Chun-chuzes), ex-bandits, now nominally Chinese soldiery, many of whom were operating as guerrillas on the Russian flank and communications under Japanese officers, as is charged." The Japanese had in their employ Zhang Zuolin (Chang Tso-lin), a famous Honghuzi leader who led his men against the Russians.

One Russian position was swarmed by around 500 Honghuzi. Russian casualties reached 20 wounded and dead before the Honghuzi were driven away.

The Chinese Imperial troops let the Honghuzi roam freely, since many of them used to be comrades, as described by Dr. Seaman: "They can not be caught, the plain truth being that the best of fellowship exists between them and the imperial troops, their old comrades of yore." Seaman also mentioned the reason for the Honghuzi hatred towards the Russians:

The Chinaman, be he Hung-hutze or peasant, in his relation to the Russians in this conflict with Japan has not forgotten the terrible treatment accorded him since the Muscovite occupation of Manchuria. He still remembers the massacre at Blagovestchensk when nearly 8,000 unarmed men, women, and children were driven at the point of the bayonet into the raging Amur, until—as one of the Russian officers who participated in that brutal murder told me at Chin-Wang-Tao in 1900— 'the execution of my orders made me almost sick, for it seemed as though I could have walked across the river on the bodies of the floating dead.' Not a Chinaman escaped, except forty who were employed by a leading foreign merchant who ransomed their lives at a thousand rubles each. These, and many even worse, atrocities are remembered and now is their moment for revenge. So it was easy for Japan to enlist the sympathy of these men, especially when emphasized by liberal pay, as is now the case. It is believed that more than 10,000 of these bandits, divided into companies of from 200 to 300 each and led by Japanese officers, are now in the pay of Japan.

=== Zhang Zuolin's forces ===
Zhang Zuolin (Chung Tsor Lin) commanded a large army of Honghuzi, who were allied to the Japanese during the war. Louis Livingston Seaman wrote an account of his meeting with Zhang and his army:

While we were in Newchwang reports of raids by the bandit Hung-hutzes (commonly spelled Chun-chuzes in American newspapers), literally the "Red Beards," of Manchuria, although not one of them has a red beard, or any other kind of a beard, became so frequent that my companion, Captain Boyd, and myself determined to try to visit them. We hoped to see for ourselves something of the characteristics and methods of those 10,000 or more guerrillas that on the west infest the border of the fighting zone in Manchuria, harrowing the rear and right flank of the Russian army, compelling it to quadruple its Cossack guards in that region in order to protect its supply-trains, as well as the refugees from Port Arthur in their efforts to reach Mukden by way of Hsin-Min-Tung.

We both had Chinese passports, and Captain Boyd had received credentials from Minister Conger and the Peking authorities to visit General Ma, and the Chinese troops in his command assembled on the borderland, ostensibly to see that no invasion of Chinese neutral territory should occur from either of the great belligerents. General Ma is the commanderin-chief of the Chinese troops in that region and by an envious turn of fate is the commander of the 10,000 Hung-hutzes now wearing the imperial uniform of China as part of her army.

The Hung-hutzes are excellent horsemen, well mounted and armed, who for centuries have lived as outlaws and brigands, defying the authority of the Imperial Government, roaming at will, levying tribute, and hesitating at nothing in the calendar of crimes in the accomplishment of their nefarious purposes.

The head robber of these bands for several years has been one Chung Tsor Lin, now holding the rank of colonel in the Chinese army. Within two years Chung and his band of followers obtained so complete a mastery over the entire border region of Manchuria for some hundreds of miles that the Government, in true Chinese fashion, ceased to oppose them and made terms with them by adopting them into the Chinese army. They are now troops in good standing, with highway robbery semiofficially recognized as one of their perquisites.

The adoption of bandits into the army has not changed their habits in robbing and murdering, if need be, and occasionally the soldiers keep up their work as individuals, when they are not plundering Russian refugees en route to Siberia, or worrying the Cossacks. In addition to these uniformed robbers, practically every peasant in the region at this time of year becomes a robber on his own account. It is when the crops are nearly full grown, and the kaoliang, a kind of broom corn, is from twelve to fifteen feet high, that the peasant turns marauder and outlaw. This staple crop, kaoliang, affords a perfect cover for troops or cutthroats, and one has a frightful ordeal in riding through it in August, with the thermometer in the nineties and its high growth cuts off the free circulation of air. The allied armies, among whom were the American troops, realized this in 1900 in their toilsome march from Taku to Tien-Tsin and Peking, when many dropped on the way from heat prostration.

With the kaoliang to hide his movements, the peasant abandons his legitimate calling and, arming himself with any convenient weapon, starts out either alone or in the company of a few congenial companions to plunder on the highway, or to rob the little villages near where they live. When success attends them they band in greater numbers and sometimes fight the Hung-hutzes, the regular robber bands, or perhaps join them temporarily. And this diabolic work goes on until it is time to gather the crops, when they return to their families, who most likely have been robbed during their interval of absence. When danger threatens, the peasant bands scatter in every direction in the high kaoliang or return to their homes, just as the Filipinos used to do when sharply pursued by American troops, when they cast aside such uniforms as they wore, and became "amigos," for practical advantages.

It was to visit these organized robbers that we started from Newchwang. It was a somewhat perilous adventure. Some of these bandits were reported to be near Kao-Pang-Tzi, and we set out for that place. Good fortune attended us at once. I chanced to have with me a photograph of Li Hung Chang and myself, taken in the palace of the old Viceroy in Peking, shortly before his death, the last picture made of the old statesman, whom I knew very well by reason of several visits to Peking. That photograph was a veritable talisman on our trip. My kit also contained a pocket operating-case, a hypodermic syringe, and some medical necessities for use in emergencies.

We stopped on our first night out at a Chinese inn, and found there a well-to-do Chinese merchant from Hsin-Min-Tung on his way to the nearby mountains in search of health. He was suffering acutely from an affection which I was able to relieve in a measure. Learning through my mafoo that we were traveling north, and were desirous of meeting the Hung-hutzes, he advised us to go at once to Hsin-Min-Tung, where General Chung Tsor Lin commanded, and gave us a long letter of introduction to his own " number one" man in Hsin-Min-Tung, whom he had left in charge of his business. This letter proved invaluable, for the next day on delivering it we were at once greeted as friends, and given the best quarters in the merchant's compound. Servants were assigned to us, and we were made as comfortable as the situation admitted. Russian soldiers still patrolled the streets at irregular intervals, and at times the town was filled with refugees coming from Port Arthur, Chefoo, or Tien-Tsin in special trains from the south, en route to Mukden or Siberia. Hsin-Min-Tung was the terminus of the line of railroad, and connected at KaoPang-Tzi with the main line from Tien-Tsin. The intention is to build the road about twenty miles further to make a junction with the main line at Mukden. It was over this gap in the railroad system about twenty miles that the refugees had to flee.

It was raining when we arrived at HsinMin-Tung and the condition of the roads was almost indescribable. For miles we had not seen a stone the size of an egg, as the valley of the Liao is alluvial and as level as a plain. With its luxuriant crop of kaoliang it looked like a scene in the corn belt of Iowa or Kansas; but a little rain in the greasy, mucky soil, mixed by the passing of a few Chinese carts, makes these roads resemble quagmires, often impassable. They dry quickly however, but it was a pathetic sight to see long trains of two-wheeled carts, dragged by five or seven donkeys or mules, each piled high with the belongings of the refugees, often surmounted by women with little ones, while the men walked and endeavored to cheer one another with songs over the dreary twenty miles to Mukden. Many of these parties, unattended by troops, were attacked and robbed by the Hung-hutzes along this dreaded way.

In the rooms assigned to us in our merchantfriend's compound we found a pile of giant firecrackers, the pile being nearly as large as an upright piano. I suggested buying them to be exploded in honor of what we called the American occupation of the place. There we were with Cossacks on the north and east,| Japanese on the southeast, Chinese soldiers under General Ma to the west and northwest, and Hung-hutze robbers all around us, and we unable to speak a dozen words of any of the languages that those several people use. Our interpreter was the sole conversational link between us and the remote world in which we found ourselves.

We asked the price of the entire lot of firecrackers. They couldn't understand how we could want so many. Finally they brought a retinue of clerks with their curious adding machines, and we learned that the pile would cost us about 31 rubles. I was for buying the lot and giving them to the natives for a celebration. The Chinese dearly love the noise of exploding firecrackers. Captain Boyd, however, suggested that the explosion of so large a number might cause the neighboring belligerents to swoop down on the place in the belief than an infantry engagement was going on and that we might be gobbled up. Therefore, we purchased only a moderate quantity, and to the great delight of the natives gave them away to be fired from long bamboo poles. What a great noise they all made! This established our standing in the community. Every one in the place immediately became our friend. The Chinese are antagonistic to the Russians, and this indulgence in fun-making resulted most fortunately for us, for the following afternoon a party of Cossacks who in some way had heard of our presence, and suspected us to be Japanese spies, went through the town in search of us, but not one word as to our hidden whereabouts could they secure from the natives. Those firecrackers had tied the tongue of every person in the village and made them our friends.

On the morning after our arrival we called on the Chi Fu, or prefect of the place, whose name was Tsung Zao Ku, and were received cordially. Then we were presented to the great ex-bandit of all Manchuria, the head robber of the Hung-hutzes, called by his followers General Chung Tsor Lin, the man whom we most wanted to see, the man who was formerly a terror to all that region, but who now, as I have said, held the rank and emoluments of a colonel in the Chinese army. His yamen adjoined that of the prefect.

We found the General a handsome fellow, lithe and graceful, and as mild a mannered man as ever slit a throat or sent a soul to heaven. He made us entirely at home in his luxurious yamen, and many drafts of excellent tea were brewed in his exquisite old Pekinese cloisonne teapot and served in cups to match, while we admired some fine examples of Chien Lung Fuing and other porcelains. My fancy was especially taken by two priceless Ming polychrome pear bottles that stood by his velvet-covered kong, or brick bed, resembling a flat Dutch oven. He observed my interest, and displayed his appreciation by ordering the only good bottle of wine (fine old Madeira) I tasted while in Manchuria. My mafoo Wang was a capital interpreter. Captain Boyd soon had the General and his cavalry and infantry guards lined up for the kodak, after which he told us we were his guests, and were at liberty to range through the country at will, only we must never go unattended or unarmed.

Calling a petty officer, he ordered a guard

With friendly relations thoroughly established, we spent an interesting evening. We had a visit from Chang Lin Lung, a guest of the Chi Fu. His home is in Mukden. He left there after hostilities began and when the increasing numbers of the Russians made it dangerous for him to remain. He told us much of Chung, saying that until a few years ago he ruled all this territory with an iron hand, as a bandit, doing as he pleased west of the Liao River. When China absorbed him and his followers into her army he obtained an allowance from the government sufficiently liberal to pay his men well, the government supplying equipment, while each man furnished his own mount and provided his own "chow."

From Chang we learned what we had suspected before: that these robbers were now really officered by Japanese. There were about 300 with Chung as his immediate guard. There were no less than eight Japanese officers directing the operations of another band which we visited. It is said that Chung was paid handsomely for all this; his followers probably got nothing, except the opportunity of occasional private plundering of Russian refugees as they fled north. Some of the Japanese officers were disguised as Chinese, and were doing most effective work. Their guerilla warfare caused serious embarrassment to Kuropatkin's army, robbing supply-trains, and compelling double guards on lines of communication, and additional protection to his right flank and rear. The operations of this band somewhat resembled those of Mosby and his men during our Civil War.

Two days before we arrived a party of Russians were attacked by 200 of these bandits, seven miles from Hsiu-Min-Tung. Five were killed and four decapitated, their heads being carried to camp on pike poles. The same band wiped out a Cossack escort that was driving 1,000 cattle and ponies to the Russian troops, and captured the whole herd. Over 1,000 Cossacks in revenge were raiding the region not ten miles away, but their efforts were useless.

At the very outset Chung showed us unusual attention. Trumpets summoned his entire guard of 300 men. There was a great commotion and soon the whole outfit of so-called soldiers was lined up for our inspection and kodak designs. Then the special guard of twenty men, ten for each of us, was called out and put at our disposal. The next morning we started on an expedition of sightseeing with our guard. The plan was to visit one of the neighboring bands, but we were interrupted about five miles northeast of HsinMin-Tung by the appearance of several Cossack scouts, and we promptly retired in an opposite direction. We were in an interesting position. With first a screen of Japanese scouts not many miles to the southeast of us, the Ruskies and Cossacks in front and to the north, the Hung-hutzes to the west and south— [...]

The night we arrived in Kow-Pangtze five Japanese officers, supported by a number of Hung-hutzes, entered the railway train and took from it a Chinese interpreter who had served the Russians during the Boxer war. They marched him to a nearby field of kaoliang and shot him five times, leaving his body unburied for two days. What eventually became of it I do not know, but a few days later they attempted the same high-handed procedure with Chin Sho Shan and eighty of his followers as a support.

=== Attacks on Japanese ===
Some Honghuzi also attacked Japanese forces in Manchuria. A Japanese officer told Fred Arthur McKenzie that "Sometimes the robbers come and fire shots into our houses at night time. If we did not make thick earthen ramparts around, we would be killed."

== Other conflicts ==
In 1937 the honghuzi were recruited as Patrol Defense Battlation (巡防营) to fight alongside revolutionary forces in Northeast China.

== See also ==
- Shanlin, Qing-dynasty period bandits in Northeast China
- Mounted bandits, which Honghuzi were a type of
- Routiers, bands of mercenary bandits comparable to honghuzi who terrorized western Europe during the Hundred Years' War
- Chinese people in Finland § Chinese migrant workers (1916–1917), Honghuzi prisoners of the Russian Empire
