= Su Bingwen =

Chinese military leader

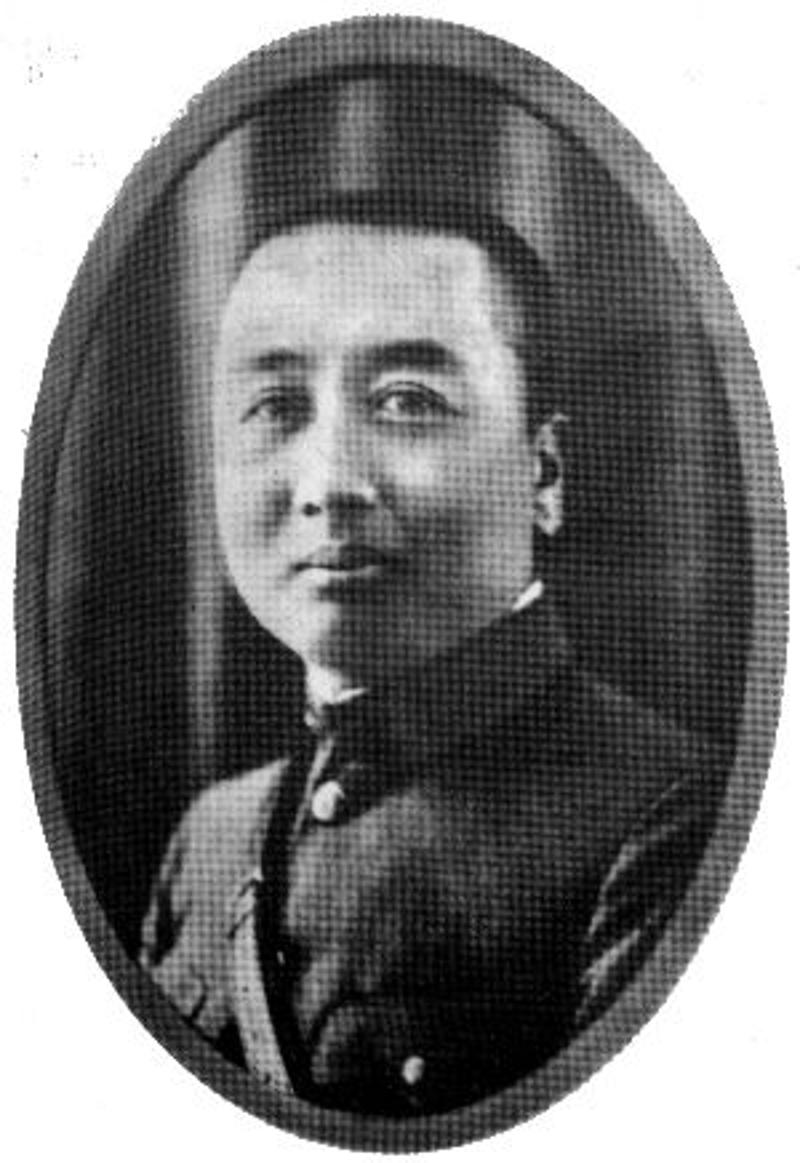
Su Bingwen

Su Bingwen (simplified Chinese: 苏炳文; traditional Chinese: 蘇炳文; pinyin: Sū Bǐngwén; Wade–Giles: Su Ping-wen) (22 October 1892 – 22 May 1975), was a Chinese National Revolutionary Army general who commanded anti-Japanese units during the Pacification of Manchukuo.

== Biography ==
Graduating from an officers' school in 1914, he joined the Model Regiment as a platoon leader in 1916, became a company commander, and then battalion commander. He served in the Fujian Army in 1920 as the first Army Brigade Chief of Staff, then the Chief of Staff 13th brigade of the Northeast Army. In 1921 he commanded the 6th Army brigade in the north east, then the 17th Division office in 1927. In 1928, Su became Jiang's chief of staff and deputy commander of the northeastern border National Defense Office Directory. First in 1930 as the military commander of the Eastern Railway garrison then, the Hulunbuir garrison commander in 1931 in charge of the Heilongjiang garrisons of the "Barga District" at the extreme west of Heilongjiang on the Soviet frontier.

After the Mukden Incident occurred, Gen. Su kept his isolated command beyond the Greater Khingan mountain range free of both any of the fighting or any bodies of Japanese troops, and doing nothing of importance in support of either Manchukuo or Gen. Ma Zhanshan. In consequence the farmers settled along the Chinese Eastern Railway mainline west of Qiqihar had remained undisturbed by the upheaval gripping the land and were able to get in their harvests.

Then on September 27, when the Japanese turned their attentions south to restore the security of the vital facilities in the South of Manchuria endangered by the volunteer forces there, Gen. Su Bingwen's soldiers staged a mutiny seizing hundreds of Japanese civilians and isolated military personnel as hostages. The mutineers, calling themselves the Heilongjiang National Salvation Army moved eastwards aboard trains towards Qiqihar to join Gen. Ma Zhanshan in re-capturing that provincial capital.

Ma Zhanshan had emerged onto the plains again from his shelter in the Lesser Khingan Range along the Amur River after the Japanese had defeated the forces in the north. He arrived in Longmen County in September and established relationship with Su Bingwen's force. But from September to December 1932, nearly 30,000 Japanese and Manchukuoan soldiers including the Japanese 14th Division and the 4,500 Mongol Cavalrymen of the Manchukuoan "Khingan" Army directed a fierce campaign at Su and Ma's troops.

On November 28, 1932, Japanese 14th division attacked Ma Zhanshan and Su Bingwen around Qiqihar. Japanese planes bombed Ma Zhanshan's headquarters in Hailar. By December 3, the Japanese took over Hailar's Ma Zhanshan headquarters. The following day, after heavy fighting, Ma Zhanshan and Su Bingwen and the remnants of their forces left Hailar for the Soviet border and entered Russian territory on December 5. Most of their troops were transferred to Rehe.

After the retreat to the Soviet Union, Su returned to Nanjing, via Germany and served the KMT government as a military board member and military inspection group director during the Second Sino-Japanese War. He retired in 1945 to go to Beijing.

In February 1955, Su served in Heilongjiang Province as member of the CPPCC Standing Committee, a member of the CPPCC National Committee, and member of the provincial People's Committee, and was Founding Director, Provincial vice chairman of the Revolutionary Committee of the Chinese Kuomintang, among other posts. On 9 July 1957, he became a government counselor and managed in Harbin. He was targeted during the Anti-Rightist Campaign.

On 22 May 1975, Su died at Heilongjiang Province Hospital in Harbin.

== Sources ==
- Su Bingwen
- Notes On A Guerrilla Campaign
- "The volunteer armies of northeast China". Archived from the original on March 24, 2012 – via Questia.
