= Shigeru Honjō =

Japanese general (1876-1945)

General Baron Shigeru Honjō
- 本庄 繁
- Honjō in 1931
- Born: 10 May 1876; Hyōgo, Japan
- Died: November 30, 1945 (aged 69); Japan
- Military career
- Allegiance: Empire of Japan
- Branch: Imperial Japanese Army
- Service years: 1897–1936
- Rank: General
- Commands: 10th Division; Kwantung Army
- Conflicts: Russo-Japanese War; Siberian Intervention; Second Sino-Japanese War
- Awards: Order of the Sacred Treasures (1st class); Order of the Golden Kite (1st class); Order of the Rising Sun (1st class)

General Baron Shigeru Honjō (本庄 繁, Honjō Shigeru; 10 May 1876 – 30 November 1945) was a general in the Imperial Japanese Army who commanded the Kwantung Army during the invasion of Manchuria. He later served as chief aide-de-camp to the Emperor, but was dismissed due to his apparent sympathy for the rebels in the February 26 incident.

== Biography ==
Honjō was born into a farming family in Hyōgo prefecture, and attended military preparatory schools as a youth. He graduated from the 9th class of the Imperial Japanese Army Academy in 1897, and was commissioned as a second lieutenant in the infantry. Among his classmates were future Prime Minister Abe Nobuyuki, and generals Sadao Araki and Iwane Matsui. In 1902 he graduated from the 19th class of the Army Staff College.

Honjō served with distinction during the Russo-Japanese War in the IJA 20th Infantry Regiment, and was promoted to captain during that conflict. After the war, he was assigned to a number of staff positions within the Imperial Japanese Army General Staff.

In 1907-1908, Honjō was dispatched to Beijing and Shanghai as a military attaché, and the following year was promoted to major. After serving in more staff positions, including a stint as instructor at the Army Staff College, he was promoted to lieutenant colonel in 1917, and was sent to Europe as a military attache following World War I. In 1919, he accompanied Japanese forces during the Siberian Intervention against the Bolshevik Red Army in eastern Russia.

Honjō was the commanding officer of 11th Regiment from 1919 to 1921. He served as adviser to Zhang Zuolin in Manchuria from 1921 to 1924. He was promoted to major general in 1922, and in 1924 was given command of the IJA 4th Infantry Brigade.

In 1927 Honjō was promoted to lieutenant general and appointed commander of the IJA 10th Division in 1928. In 1931 he was made commander in chief of the Kwantung Army in Manchuria, commanding it during the Mukden Incident and invasion of Manchuria.

Although Honjō was relieved of command in 1932 for insubordination, he returned to Japan as a national hero, and served as a member of the Supreme War Council from 1932 to 1933. He was accorded the highest decorations and honors, and was elevated to the title of danshaku (baron) under the kazoku peerage system.

He later served as Chief aide-de-camp to emperor Hirohito until 1936, when Honjō's suspected involvement in the February 26 Incident led to his retirement. During his time as aide-de-camp he kept an extensive diary, which was published by the University of Tokyo Press in 1983.

Towards the end of World War II, he emerged from retirement to serve as a Privy Councilor. After the surrender of Japan in 1945 he was accused of war crimes by SCAP and arrested; however, he committed suicide before the trial began. His grave is at the Tama Cemetery in Fuchu, Tokyo.
