= Anti-Japanese resistance volunteers in China =

Volunteer armies and resistance movements in Japanese-occupied China

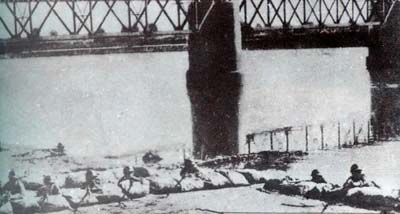
Several men lining up in canoes in a river.

The Anti-Japanese resistance volunteers in China refer to the volunteer armies formed during the Japanese invasion of Manchuria, and until 1933 waged war against Japanese and Manchukuo forces over much of Northeast China. Kim Song-ju (Kim Il-sung) was significant in the unified organization's declaration, and Yang Jingyu served as a major commander.

Due to Chiang Kai-shek's policy of non-resistance, the Japanese were soon able to establish complete control. After the League of Nations refused to do more than voice its disapproval, there were many small guerrilla organizations which resisted Japanese and Manchukuo rule:

- Jilin Self-Defence Army
- Chinese People's National Salvation Army
- Northeastern Volunteer Righteous and Brave Fighters
- Northeastern Loyal and Brave Army
- Northeast People's Anti-Japanese Volunteer Army
- Northeast Anti-Japanese National Salvation Army
- Northeast Anti-Japanese United Army
- Heilongjiang National Salvation Army
- Anti-Japanese Army for the Salvation of the Country

Besides these armies there were other forces under leaders like Zhang Haitian and others. Zhao Hong Wenguo was influential in supporting some armies such as the Iron and Blood Army, with many of her children participating in anti-Japanese insurgent activities.

For the whole year of 1932 the Japanese had to occupy themselves with fighting these Chinese forces in various areas of Manchuria. Gen. Ma Zhanshan, nominally in command of them all, had a total fighting force estimated by the Japanese at 300,000 men. Following their defeat, many retreated into Rehe and other places in China. The remainder were forced to disperse their remnants into small units, often called shanlin. Ongoing Japanese "Anti-Bandit" campaigns and other "pacification" measures steadily reduced the number of insurgents. Their numbers declined from 120,000 in 1933 to 50,000 in 1934; 40,000 in 1935; 30,000 in 1936; and 20,000 in 1937. As of September 1938, the number of insurgents was estimated by the Japanese at 10,000.

From 1935 the Northeast Anti-Japanese United Army, under the control of the Chinese Communist Party, absorbed many of these volunteer forces into its own ranks.

== See also ==
- Resistance movement
- Resistance during World War II
- Soviet partisans
- Yugoslav Partisans
  - Croatian Partisans
  - Macedonian Partisans
  - Serbian Partisans
  - Slovene Partisans
- The March of the Volunteers
- Red Spear Society
- Second Sino-Japanese War

== Sources ==
- Hsu Long-hsuen and Chang Ming-kai, History of The Sino-Japanese War (1937–1945) 2nd Ed., 1971. Translated by Wen Ha-hsiung, Chung Wu Publishing; 33, 140th Lane, Tung-hwa Street, Taipei, Taiwan Republic of China.
- Jowett, Phillip S., Rays of The Rising Sun, Armed Forces of Japan's Asian Allies 1931-45, Volume I: China & Manchuria, 2004. Helion & Co. Ltd., 26 Willow Rd., Solihull, West Midlands, England.
- Coogan, Anthony (July 1993). "The volunteer armies of Northeast China". History Today. Vol. 43, no. 7. pp. 36–41. Archived from the original on 2012-10-18 – via Questia.
- Notes On A Guerrilla Campaign, from http://www.democraticunderground.com accessed November 4, 2006
