= Zhao Shangzhi =

Chinese general (1908–1942)

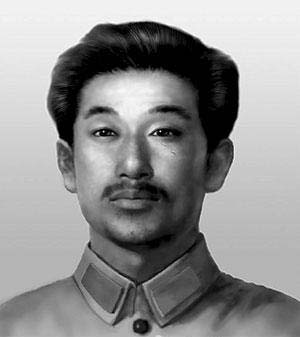
- Born: 26 October 1908; Chaoyang, Zhili, Qing dynasty (now Chaoyang, Liaoning, China)
- Died: 12 February 1942 (aged 33); Luobei County, Heilongjiang, Manchukuo (now Hegang, Heilongjiang, China)
- Military career
- Allegiance: Communist China
- Branch: Northeast Anti-Japanese United Army
- Commands: Northeast Anti-Japanese United Army
- Conflicts: Second Sino-Japanese War †

Zhao Shangzhi (simplified Chinese: 赵尚志; traditional Chinese: 趙尚志; pinyin: Zhào Shàngzhì; 26 October 1908 –12 February 1942) was a Chinese military commander. Born into a peasant-turned-intellectual family in Chaoyang, Liaoning, he participated in the May Thirtieth Movement in 1925, and joined the Chinese Communist Party (CCP) in the same year. In November 1925, he went to study in the Whampoa Military Academy in Guangzhou.

After 18 September 1932 he took the charge of the CCP Northeast military division. In October 1933, he was in charge of Zhuhe anti-Japan guerrillas, and was promoted to commander of the Northeast Anti-Japanese United Army in 1934.

On 12 February 1942, he was captured by Japanese military police after being attacked by an agent provocateur, and died later at the age of 34.

The city of Zhuhe, where he fought against the Japanese, was renamed in 1946 to Shangzhi in his memory.
