= Japanese invasion of Manchuria =

1931–32 invasion of China prior to the Second Sino-Japanese War

- Part of the Second Sino-Japanese War and the interwar period
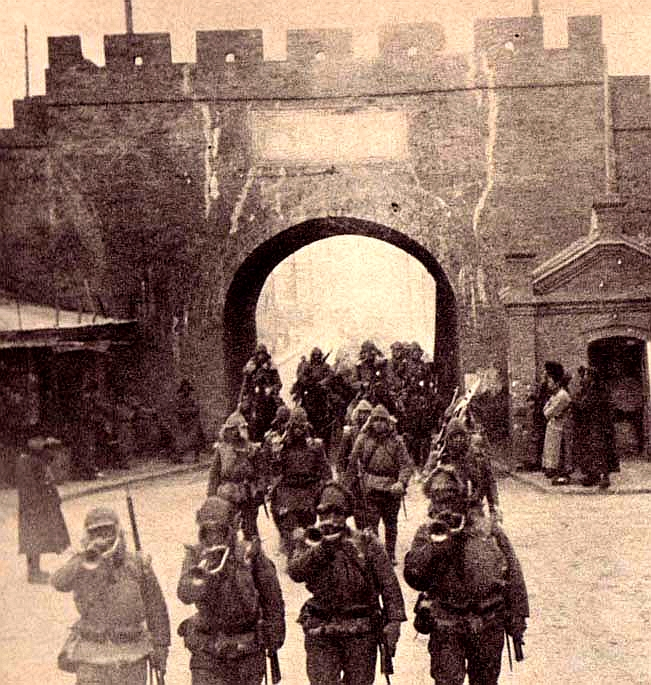
- Japanese troops marching into Qiqihar on November 19, 1931
Date	September 18, 1931 – February 27, 1932 (5 months, 1 week and 2 days)
Location	Manchuria region, Republic of China
Result	Japanese victory: Tanggu Truce
Territorial changes	Manchuria seized by the Kwantung Army; Establishment of Manchukuo as a Japanese puppet state

Belligerents
Japan; Manchukuo (from 1932); Chinese collaborators	China

Commanders and leaders
Shigeru Honjō; Jirō Tamon; Senjuro Hayashi; Puyi; Zhang Haipeng	Zhang Xueliang; Ma Zhanshan; Feng Zhanhai; Ding Chao (surrendered)

Strength
30,000–60,450 men	160,000 men

Casualties and losses
Western historians' estimate: 10,000 dead from all causes (Note: Including the Jehol Campaign in 1933)	Western historians' estimate: 50,000 military and civilian dead from all causes Chinese claim: (Note: Chinese Nationalist Government's investigation of deaths in Northeast China from 18 September 1931 until 27 February 1932); Northeastern Army: 4,890 dead Police force: 244 dead Anti-Japanese Volunteer Armies: 6,675 dead
- 4,108 Chinese civilians dead

Japanese invasion of Manchuria

Chinese name
- Traditional Chinese: 九一八事變
- Simplified Chinese: 九一八事变
Transcriptions

Alternative name
- Traditional Chinese: 瀋陽事變
- Simplified Chinese: 沈阳事变
Transcriptions

Japanese name
- Kanji: 滿洲事變
- Kana: まんしゅうじへん
Transcriptions
- Romanization: Manshū Jihen

The Empire of Japan's Kwantung Army invaded the Manchuria region of China on 18 September 1931, immediately following the Mukden incident, a false flag event staged by Japanese military personnel as a pretext to invade. At the war's end in February 1932, the Japanese established the puppet state of Manchukuo. The occupation lasted until mid-August 1945, towards the end of the Second World War, in the face of an onslaught by the Soviet Union and Mongolia during the Manchurian Strategic Offensive Operation.

With the invasion having attracted great international attention, the League of Nations produced the Lytton Commission (headed by British politician Victor Bulwer-Lytton) to evaluate the situation, with the organization delivering its findings in October 1932. Its findings and recommendations, namely that the Japanese puppet state of Manchukuo was not to be recognized, and Manchuria had to be returned to Chinese sovereignty, prompted the Japanese government to withdraw from the League entirely.

== Background ==
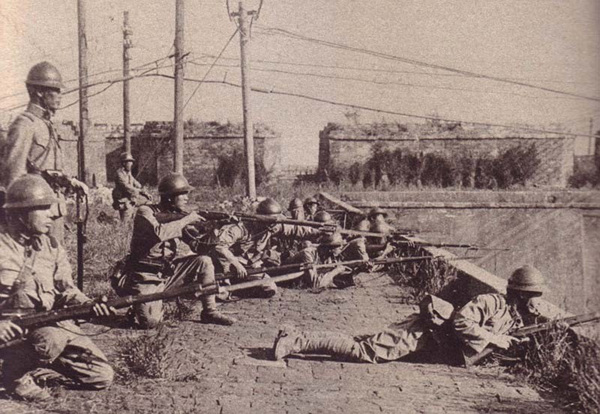
Japanese soldiers of 29th Regiment on the Mukden West Gate

Since the end of the Russo-Japanese War in 1905, the Liaodong peninsula was a leased territory of Japan. Thus, Tokyo exercised informal rule over Manchuria. Under Japanese control, economic gains increased; by the end of the 1920s, 39.4 percent of all colonial financial investments went into Manchuria. Japan was confronted in the early 1930s with two crucial problems. Due to the world financial crisis, its economy had been in a state of chronic malaise for three years. In Manchuria, nationalists under the former Japanese ally Zhang Xueliang had aroused intense anti-Japanese sentiment.

In 1928 Zhang reunited with the Kuomintang under Chiang Kai-shek, forming the Nationalist government. As a result, Japan found itself increasingly deprived of its influence in Manchuria. Radical groups within the government and the Army schemed for the opportunity to act on the “Manchurian question.” The Hamaguchi government, and especially the non-interventionist policy in China of Foreign Minister Kijūrō Shidehara, was considered negative for future Japanese interests. In order to get rid of Shidehara's conciliatory policy, radical military officers including Daisaku Komoto and Suzuki Teiichi planned a coup d’état to take control of the civil government in Tokyo.

== Prelude ==
There were two pivotal events that eventually led up to the invasion of Manchuria. In July 1931, near Changchun in the Wanpaoshan region, a dispute over the construction of an irrigation system by Korean farmers on Chinese-owned land escalated into violence. Although no one had been killed or seriously wounded in the Wanpaoshan Incident, Japanese extremists seized this as a pretext to fuel anti-Chinese sentiment, hoping to promote a more aggressive Japanese policy in Manchuria. Believing that taking full control of Manchuria would be in the best interests of Japan, and acting in the spirit of the Japanese concept of (jap. 下克上, gekokujō the low overturns the high), Kwantung Army Colonel Seishirō Itagaki and Lieutenant Colonel Kanji Ishiwara devised a plan to provoke Japan into invading Manchuria by setting up a false flag incident for the pretext of invasion. Meanwhile, central army authorities played up the Manchurian issue with the purpose of winning over the public to the cause of the coming expedition and also to create an atmosphere of imminence to forestall disarmament. Rumors of a Manchurian expedition began circulating in August and in early September, with the Government frequently questioned about whether there would soon be war in Manchuria.

The operation was planned for 28 August, but was subsequently brought forward. On the night of 18 September a bomb was placed, probably by Captain Imada Shintaro of the Army Special Service Agency, near the tracks of the South Manchuria Railway at Mukden. The bomb was far enough away to do no real damage. At around 10:20 pm (22:20) on September 18, the explosives were detonated. (Note: In fact, a train from Changchun passed by the site on this damaged track without difficulty and arrived at Shenyang at 10:30 pm (22:30).) Fighting between the Japanese Railway guards and Chinese soldiers quartered at a nearby barracks ensued. However, after fifteen hours of fierce combat all important military installations in and about Mukden were completely in the hands of the Japanese army.

== Initial annexation ==
On September 18, 1931, the Japanese Imperial General Headquarters, which had decided upon a policy of localizing the incident, communicated its decision to the Kwantung Army command. However, Kwantung Army commander-in-chief General Shigeru Honjō instead ordered his forces to proceed to expand operations all along the South Manchuria Railway. On the early morning of 19 September, the 29th Infantry Regiment entered Mukden and overwhelmed the resisting Chinese forces, seizing the inner walled city. At the same time, the 2nd Battalion occupied Pei Ta Ying, having faced stubborn resistance, before moving on to Tung Ta Ying. Afterwards, the 2nd Division was also dispatched and drove out the remaining Chinese troops from the eastern area of Mukden. Meanwhile, the 1st Battalion engaged the Chinese forces at Kuan Cheng Tze, near Changchun. On the same day, in response to General Honjō's request, the Chōsen Army in Korea under General Senjūrō Hayashi ordered the 20th Infantry Division to split its force, forming the 39th Mixed Brigade, which departed on that day for Manchuria without authorization from the Emperor. By the end of September 19, the Japanese occupied Yingkou, Liaoyang, Shenyang, Fushun, Dandong, Siping, and Changchun. The following day, the commander of the Chinese 2nd Army, Wan Shu Cheng, ordered the withdrawal of the 44th and 643rd Regiments, which were then stationed at Taching, back to Tianjin.

On September 21, the Japanese captured Jilin City. On 23 September, the Japanese took Jiaohe (Jilin Province) and Dunhua. On 26 September, the Governor of Kirin, Zhang Zuoxiang, was deposed and the "Provisional Provincial Government of Kirin" declared with Xi Qia as acting chairman. This new government was friendly to the Japanese and allowed them to occupy Kirin city bloodlessly. Most other provincial officials were maintained in their previous positions. On 1 October, Zhang Haipeng surrendered the Taonan area. Sometime in October, Ji Xing (吉興) surrendered the Yanbian Korean Autonomous Prefecture area and on 17 October, Yu Zhishan surrendered Eastern Liaoning to the Japanese.

Tokyo was shocked by the news of the Army acting without orders from the central government. The Japanese civilian government was thrown into disarray by this act of "gekokujō" insubordination, but as reports of one quick victory after another began to arrive, it felt powerless to oppose the Army, and its decision was to immediately send three more infantry divisions from Japan, beginning with the 14th Mixed Brigade of the IJA 7th Division. During this era, the elected government could be held hostage by the Army and Navy, since Army and Navy members were constitutionally necessary for the formation of cabinets. Without their support, the government would collapse.

== Secession movements ==
After the Liaoning Provincial government fled Mukden, it was replaced by a "Peoples Preservation Committee" which declared the secession of Liaoning province from the Republic of China. Other secessionist movements were organized in Japanese-occupied Kirin by General Xi Qia head of the Manchukuo Imperial Army, and at Harbin, by General Zhang Jinghui. In early October, at Taonan in northwest Liaoning province, General Zhang Haipeng declared his district independent of China, in return for a shipment of a large number of military supplies by the Japanese Army.

On October 13, Zhang Haipeng ordered three regiments of the Manchukuo Imperial Army under General Xu Jinglong north to take the capital of Heilongjiang province at Qiqihar. Some elements in the city offered to surrender the old walled town peacefully, and Zhang advanced cautiously to accept. However his advance guard was attacked by General Dou Lianfang's troops, and in a savage fight with an engineering company defending the north bank, were sent fleeing with heavy losses. During this fight, the Nenjiang railroad bridge was dynamited by troops loyal to General Ma Zhanshan to prevent its use.

== Resistance to the Japanese invasion ==
Using the repair of the Nen River Bridge as the pretext, the Japanese sent a repair party in early November under the protection of Japanese troops. Fighting erupted between the Japanese forces and troops loyal to the acting governor of Heilongjiang province Muslim General Ma Zhanshan, who chose to disobey the Kuomintang government's ban on further resistance to the Japanese invasion. Despite his failure to hold the bridge, General Ma Zhanshan became a national hero in China for his resistance at Nenjiang Bridge, which was widely reported in the Chinese and international press. The publicity inspired more volunteers to enlist in the Anti-Japanese Volunteer Armies.

The repaired bridge made possible the further advance of Japanese forces and their armored trains. Additional troops from Japan, notably the 4th Mixed Brigade from the 8th Division, were sent in November. On November 15, 1931, despite having lost more than 400 men and 300 left wounded since 5 November, General Ma declined a Japanese ultimatum to surrender Qiqihar. On 17 November, in subzero weather, 3,500 Japanese troops, under the command of Jirō Tamon, mounted an attack, forcing General Ma from Qiqihar by 19 November.

== Operations in southern Northeast China ==
In late November 1931, General Honjō dispatched 10,000 soldiers in 13 armored trains, escorted by a squadron of bombers, in an advance on Chinchow from Mukden. This force had advanced to within 30 kilometres (19 mi) of Chinchow when it received an order to withdraw. The operation was cancelled by Japanese War Minister General Jirō Minami, due to the acceptance of modified form of a League of Nations proposal for a "neutral zone" to be established as a buffer zone between China proper and Manchuria pending a future Chinese-Japanese peace conference by the civilian government of Prime Minister Baron Wakatsuki Reijirō in Tokyo.

However, the two sides failed to reach a lasting agreement. The Wakatsuki government soon fell and was replaced by a new cabinet led by Prime Minister Inukai Tsuyoshi. Further negotiations with the Kuomintang government failed, the Japanese government authorized the reinforcement of troops in Manchuria. In December, the rest of 20th Infantry Division, along with the 38th Mixed Brigade from the 19th Infantry Division were sent into Manchuria from Korea while the 8th Mixed Brigade from the 10th Infantry Division was sent from Japan. The total strength of the Kwantung Army was thus increased to around 60,450 men.

With this stronger force, the Japanese Army announced on December 21, the beginning of large-scale anti-bandit operations in Manchuria to quell a growing resistance movement by the local Chinese population in Liaoning and Kirin provinces. On December 28, a new government was formed in China after all members of the old Nanjing government resigned. This threw the military command into turmoil, and the Chinese army retreated to the west of the Great Wall into Hebei province, a humiliating move which lowered China's international image. Japanese forces occupied Chinchow on January 3, 1932, after the Chinese defenders retreated without giving combat.

== Occupation of Northeast China ==
With southern Manchuria secure, the Japanese turned north to complete the occupation of Manchuria. As negotiations with Generals Ma Zhanshan and Ding Chao to defect to the pro-Japanese side had failed, in early January Colonel Kenji Doihara requested collaborationist General Qia Xi to advance his forces and take Harbin. The last major Chinese regular force in northern Manchuria was led by General Ding Chao who organized the defense of Harbin successfully against General Xi until the arrival of the Japanese 2nd Division under Jirō Tamon. Japanese forces took Harbin on February 4, 1932. By the end of February Ma had sought terms and joined the newly formed Manchukuo government as governor of Heilongjiang province and Minister of War. On February 27, 1932, Ding offered to cease hostilities, ending official Chinese resistance in Manchuria, although combat by guerrilla and irregular forces continued as Japan spent many years in their campaign to pacify Manchukuo.

After it occupied Manchuria, Japan took over the region's Chinese public enterprises (many of which originated from the Zhang Zuolin and Zhang Xueliang regimes) and converted them to state-owned enterprises of Manchukuo.

In summer 1932, approximately 100,000 Chinese students left Manchuria to go to Beiping, as a political act intended to demonstrate their unwillingness to live under Japanese occupation.

Map of the Manchukuo state in 1939

== Effect on Japanese homefront ==
The conquest of Manchuria, a land rich in natural resources, was widely seen as an economic "lifeline" to save Japan from the effects of the Great Depression, generating much public support. The American historian Louise Young described Japan from September 1931 to the spring of 1933 as gripped by "war fever" as the conquest of Manchuria proved to be an extremely popular war. The metaphor of a "lifeline" suggested that Manchuria was crucial to the functioning of the Japanese economy, which explains why the conquest of Manchuria was so popular and why afterwards Japanese public opinion was so hostile towards any suggestion of letting Manchuria go.

At the time, censorship in Japan was nowhere near as stringent as it later became, and Young noted: "Had they wished, it would have been possible in 1931 and 1932 for journalists and editors to express anti-war sentiments". The liberal journal Kaizō criticized the war with the journalist Gotō Shinobu in the November 1931 edition accusing the Kwantung Army of a "two-fold coup d'état" against both the government in Tokyo and against the government of China. Voices like Kaizō were a minority as mainstream newspapers like the Asahi soon discovered that an anti-war editorial position hurt sales, and so switched over to an aggressively militaristic editorial position as the best way to increase sales. Japan's most famous pacifist, the poet Akiko Yosano had caused a sensation in 1904 with her anti-war poem "Brother Do Not Give Your Life", addressed to her younger brother serving in the Imperial Army that called the war with Russia stupid and senseless. Such was the extent of "war fever" in Japan in 1931 that even Akiko succumbed, writing a poem in 1932 praising bushidō, urging the Kwantung Army to "smash the sissified dreams of compromise" and declared that to die for the Emperor in battle was the "purest" act a Japanese man could perform.

In contrast, the Japanese Communist Party denounced the invasion in the Red Flag and launched an anti-war campaign against the Japanese Government. The campaign was met with little success. JCP leader Nosaka Sanzo (under the alias Okano), denounced the invasion and called for the Japanese people to rise-up against the government in a 1933 speech in Moscow.

== External effect ==
The Western media reported on the events with accounts of atrocities such as bombing civilians or firing upon shell-shocked survivors. It aroused considerable antipathy to Japan, which lasted until the end of World War II. When the Lytton Commission issued a report on the invasion, despite its statements that China had to a certain extent provoked Japan, and China's sovereignty over Manchuria was not absolute, Japan took it as an unacceptable rebuke and withdrew from the already declining League of Nations, which also helped create international isolation.

The Manchurian Crisis had a significant negative effect on the moral strength and influence of the League of Nations. As critics had predicted, the League was powerless if a strong nation decided to pursue an aggressive policy against other countries, allowing a country such as Japan to commit blatant aggression without serious consequences. Adolf Hitler and Benito Mussolini were also aware of this, and ultimately both followed Japan's example in aggression against their neighbors: in the case of Italy, against Abyssinia (1935–7); and Germany, against Czechoslovakia (1938–9) and Poland (1939).

== See also ==
- Huanggutun incident (Japanese assassination of the Chinese head of state Generalissimo Zhang Zuolin on 4 June 1928) and the Northeast Flag Replacement (by Zhang Xueliang on 29 December 1928)
- Chiang Kai-shek
- Military of the Republic of China
- National Revolutionary Army
- Second Sino-Japanese War

== Bibliography ==
- Clodfelter, Micheal (2008). Warfare and armed conflicts : a statistical encyclopedia of casualty and other figures, 1494–2007. Jefferson: McFarland. ISBN 9780786433193.
- Thorne, Christopher (1973). The Limits of Foreign Policy. New York: Capricorn. ISBN 978-0399111242.
- Young, Luise (1998). Japan's Total Empire: Manchuria and the Culture of Wartime Imperialism. Los Angeles: University of California Press. ISBN 9780520219342.
- Thorne, Christopher (1971). "Viscount Cecil, the Government and the Far Eastern Crisis of 1931". Historical Journal. 14 (4): 805–26. doi:10.1017/S0018246X00023372. JSTOR 2638108.
- Schwentker, Wolfgang (2022). Geschichte Japans (in German). Munich: C.H. Beck. ISBN 978-3-406-75159-2.
- Ogata, Sadako (1964). Defiance in Manchuria; the making of Japanese foreign policy, 1931-1932. Berkley: University of California Press. OCLC 1391396636.
- "1931". Events leading up to World War II. Chronological history of certain major international events leading up to and during World War II with the ostensible reasons advanced for their occurrence, 1931-1944. Washington D.C.: United States Government Printing Office. 1945.
- Coogan, Anthony (1994). "Northeast China and the Origins of the Anti-Japanese United Front". Modern China. 20 (3). Sage Publications: 282–314. doi:10.1177/009770049402000302.
- Matsusaka, Yoshihisa Tak (2003). The Making of Japanese Manchuria, 1904-1932. Harvard University press. ISBN 978-0-674-01206-6.
- Guo, Rugui (2005-07-01). Huang Yuzhang (ed.). 中国抗日战争正面战场作战记 [China's Anti-Japanese War Combat Operations]. Jiangsu People's Publishing House. ISBN 7-214-03034-9.
- Kuromiya, Hiroaki (2023). Stalin, Japan, and the Struggle for Supremacy over China, 1894–1945. New York: Routledge. ISBN 978-1-032-06673-8.
- Yoshihashi, Takehiko (1963). Conspiracy at Mukden: the rise of the Japanese military. New Haven: Yale University Press.
- Parks, Coble M. (1991). Facing Japan: Chinese Politics and Japanese Imperialism, 1931-1937. Cambridge, Mass.: Harvard University Press. ISBN 0674290119.
- Harries, Meirion; Harries, Susie (1991). Soldiers of the sun : the rise and fall of the Imperial Japanese Army. New York: Random House. ISBN 0394569350.
