= Yao Zhenshan =

Yao Zhenshan (Chinese: 姚振山; pinyin: Yáo Zhènshān; died 1941) was a Chinese soldier and leader of the resistance to the Pacification of Manchukuo.

Before the Mukden Incident, Yao was a captain, commanding a Company in the Third Battalion, 676th Regiment, 27th Brigade of the Kirin Provincial Army. Following the events at Manchuria, he joined Wang Delin's Chinese People's National Salvation Army.

After the Army, led by Wang Delin, was defeated, it retreated from Manchukuo. Yao remained behind in eastern Kirin province. Acting Commander-in-Chief of the National Salvation Army, Wu Yicheng, soon appointed Yao to Brigade Commander. He led the brigade on various expeditions and coordinated with other anti-Japanese forces to harass the Japanese. In 1934 he was made one of three First Corps Commanders in the National Salvation Army. He later cooperated with the 2nd Route Army of the Northeast Anti-Japanese United Army in the war against Japan and their Manchukuoan armies.

Following Yao's death in battle, in 1938, the wife of Kong Xianrong, another of Wang Delin's subordinates, led the small band of his remaining forces, which continued to fight until the spring of 1941, when the group was annihilated.
