= Kong Xianrong =

Kong Xianrong (simplified Chinese: 孔宪荣; traditional Chinese: 孔憲榮; pinyin: Kǒng Xiànróng; 1881－May 23, 1948), one of Wang Delin's companions who had been with him for many years as a bandit, was made one of Wang's company commanders along with Wu Yicheng, when Wang was taken into the Kirin Provincial army and became a battalion commander. When Wang Delin refused to submit to the Japanese during the invasion of Manchuria and formed the Chinese People's National Salvation Army. Kong became a commander within one of the largest and most successful of the Anti-Japanese Volunteer Armies.

In September 1932 when the forces of Wang and Feng Zhanhai managed to briefly occupy the capital of Jilin province, Things began to go wrong when the NSA became embroiled in disputes with General Li Du's Jilin Self-Defence Army. One of Li Du's subordinates tried to persuade one of Wang Delin's commanders to transfer his force into the Li's Army. Also, NSA troops were killed by Li's Army for the confiscation of the weapons of a White Russian mine owner. Finally, Li's subordinate was put in a sack and thrown into a river, probably at the instigation Kong Xianrong, Wang Delin's deputy. This rift forced the abandonment of the city.

After the Army of Wang Delin was defeated and retreated from Manchukuo, Kong Xianrong gave up the struggle, but his wife and another of Wang Delin's subordinates, Yao Zhenshan, led a small band which fought on until the spring of 1941 when it was annihilated.

== Sources ==
- The volunteer armies of northeast China
