= Wang Delin =

Chinese general (1875–1938)

Wang Delin (Chinese: 王德林; pinyin: Wáng Délín; Wade–Giles: Wang Teh-ling, 1875－1938) was a bandit, soldier, and leader of the Chinese People's National Salvation Army resisting the Japanese pacification of Manchukuo.

== Early life ==
Wang Delin was born in October 1875 in Yishui County, Shandong. He became a bandit in Manchuria after the Russian invasion in July 1900 when Tsarist forces were sent to Northeast China to protect the Russian-owned Chinese Eastern Railway (CER). Wang declared his opposition to both the Russians and China's Qing dynasty, describing himself as "forced to become an outlaw to cast out the Russians and save the nation". His band operated attacking trains along the eastern part of the CER, in the Muling and Suifenhe areas. He also attacked Russian shipping on the Songhua and Ussuri rivers and held captives for ransom. Wang was an outlaw for years, even after the fall of the Qing dynasty in 1911.

== Political actions ==
In 1917, Wang agreed that he and his followers would become part of the Jilin provincial forces, himself as commander of the Third Battalion of the First Brigade of the Jilin Army. Wang brought with him, two companions who had been with him for many years, Wu Yicheng and Kong Xianrong, each commanding a company. Still a battalion commander at the time of the Mukden Incident in 1931, Wang was stationed near Yanji, a small town in the east of Jilin province, where the Japanese were constructing a new, railway line. After Wang's troops fired on a party of Japanese surveyors, his commander attempted to persuade him to move his battalion with an offer of promotion. Wang refused to submit to the Manchukuo regime and his defiance attracted others to join him. When on February 8, 1932, Wang proclaimed the establishment of the Chinese People's National Salvation Army (NSA), his battalion of 200 men had swollen to a force of over 1,000.

By capturing the town of Dunhua on February 20, the Wang reversed the Japanese advance which had seemed irresistible until then. He was attracting the support of peasant brotherhoods and bandits, and a few Korean nationalists, that were already taking up arms against the recently proclaimed State of Manchukuo. By the end of the month, the NSA was 4,600 strong. To bring in more recruits. Wang appealed to the patriotism of Chinese soldiers in the Manchukuo forces to not fight other Chinese, shaming them into deserting and joining the volunteers. The tactic succeeded, bringing large numbers of well-armed and trained recruits.

In March 1932, a Japanese and Manchukuoan expeditionary force was defeated in a series of battles with the NSA around the shore of Lake Jingpo losing hundreds of casualties. These battles were small in scale, the volunteers using their knowledge of the local terrain to set ambushes, eventually compelling the Japanese to retreat to Harbin.

By this time Wang had about 10,000 men and he was recognized as a general by the "Old Jilin" leader Gen. Li Du at his headquarters at Sanxing in Heilongjiang Province on the lower Sungari River. He along with Gen. Ding Chao raised a number of volunteers to supplement their regulars defeated at Harbin the previous year. These various forces constituted themselves initially as the Jilin Self-Defence Army, but by the end of April 1932 they were known as the National Salvation Army.

The Japanese had concentrated northwest of Harbin against General Ma Zhanshan in spring and summer of 1932, which allowed the increase in partisan activity in Jilin and Liaoning provinces. This activity culminated in simultaneous attacks on cities throughout the South Manchurian Railway Zone as severe August floods halted Japanese operations based on Harbin, and isolated the troops engaged on them. Japanese preparations for invading Rehe province later that year had to be halted by the need to subdue this widespread partisan activity, and with Japanese forces concentrated to the west, the forces of Wang and Feng Zhanhai managed to briefly occupy the capital of Jilin province.

However things began to go wrong when the NSA became embroiled in disputes with General Li Du's Jilin Self-Defence Army. One of Li's subordinates tried to persuade one of Wang Delin's commanders to put his force into the Self-Defence Army. Also, NSA troops were killed by the Self-Defence Army for the confiscation of the weapons of a White Russian mine owner. Finally, Li's subordinate was put in a sack and thrown into a river, probably at the instigation of Wang Delin's deputy, Kong Xianrong. This rift forced the abandonment of the city.

The Japanese followed up with "Anti Bandit" Operations that fall and winter that eventually drove the Volunteer armies to break up into small bands or retreat into the Soviet Union as Wang's force did on January 13, 1933. Eventually Wang returned to China via Europe, and continued to support the anti Japanese movement. On December 20, 1938 he died in Shandong.
