= Kenji Doihara =

Japanese intelligence officer and war criminal (1883–1948)

- 土肥原 賢二
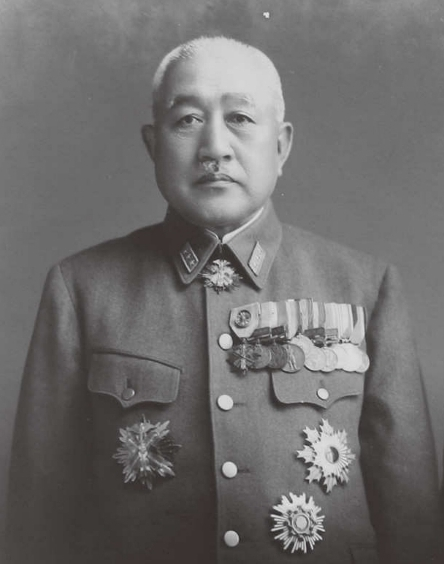
- Doihara c. 1941–45
- Born: 8 August 1883; Okayama, Japan
- Died: 23 December 1948 (aged 65); Sugamo Prison, Tokyo, Japan
- Cause of death: Execution by hanging
- Military career
- Allegiance: Empire of Japan
- Branch: Imperial Japanese Army
- Service years: 1904–1945
- Rank: General
- Nicknames: Lawrence of Manchuria, a reference to T. E. Lawrence
- Commands: 14th Division; Fifth Army; Seventh Area Army
- Conflicts: Siberian Intervention; Second Sino-Japanese War; World War II
- Awards: Order of the Rising Sun

Kenji Doihara (土肥原 賢二, Doihara Kenji; 8 August 1883 – 23 December 1948) was a Japanese general and intelligence officer. He was instrumental in the Japanese invasion of Manchuria and the establishment of Manchukuo.

Born in Okayama Prefecture, Doihara became an officer in the Imperial Japanese Army and was involved in intelligence and political operations on the Chinese continent. In 1931, he was involved in the Mukden Incident, and was responsible for bringing the former Chinese Emperor Puyi to Manchuria, in order to install him as the nominal ruler of Manchukuo. Doihara continued to work to expand Japanese influence in China throughout the 1930s.

He held a number of senior military positions during the Second Sino-Japanese War and the Pacific War. After the surrender of Japan, he was convicted of war crimes by the International Military Tribunal for the Far East, sentenced to death, and hanged in December 1948.

== Early life and career ==
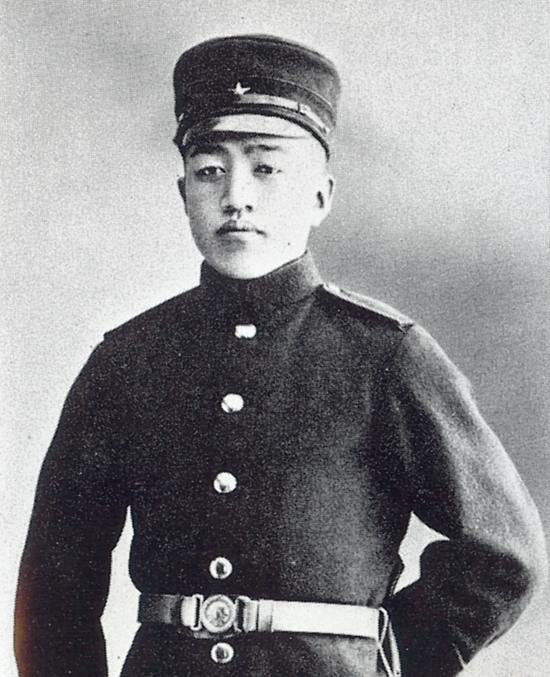
Doihara in army cadet uniform, 1903

Kenji Doihara was born in Okayama City, Okayama Prefecture. He attended military preparatory schools as a youth, and graduated from the 16th class of the Imperial Japanese Army Academy in 1904. He was assigned to various infantry regiments as a junior officer, and returned to school to graduate from the 24th class of the Army Staff College in 1912. He had learned to speak fluent Mandarin Chinese and other Chinese dialects, and due to this he would often be given positions in military intelligence.

After having graduated from Staff college, Doihara was posted to China, working as an aide to Colonel Rihachirō Banzai, a Japanese military advisor to the Beiyang government. Doihara served in the semi-official intelligence organisation operated by Banzai out of Beijing. In this position, he was involved in activities supporting the Anhui clique, which Japan favoured. By the mid 1920s, Doihara controlled a network of agents and informers among White Russian émigrés, including women working in brothels and opium dens. He secured their loyalty by providing them with a steady supply of opium. Doihara was attached to the IJA 2nd Infantry Regiment from 1926 to 1927 and the IJA 3rd Infantry Regiment in 1927. In 1927, he was part of an official tour to China and then attached to the IJA 1st Division from 1927 to 1928.

In March 1928, he was assigned to serve as a military adviser to the warlord Zhang Zuolin, who controlled Manchuria, but Zhang was assassinated by a Kwantung Army officer three months later. Doihara continued to serve as a military advisor to Zhang Xueliang, the son and successor of Zhang Zuolin, but Xueliang disliked him. According to Xueliang, Doihara unsuccessfully attempted to persuade him to declare himself Emperor of Manchuria. In 1929, he was promoted to colonel and commanded the IJA 30th Infantry Regiment. In 1931, he became head of the special service organisation (特務機関, tokumu kikan) of the Kwantung Army in Mukden.

== "Lawrence of Manchuria” ==
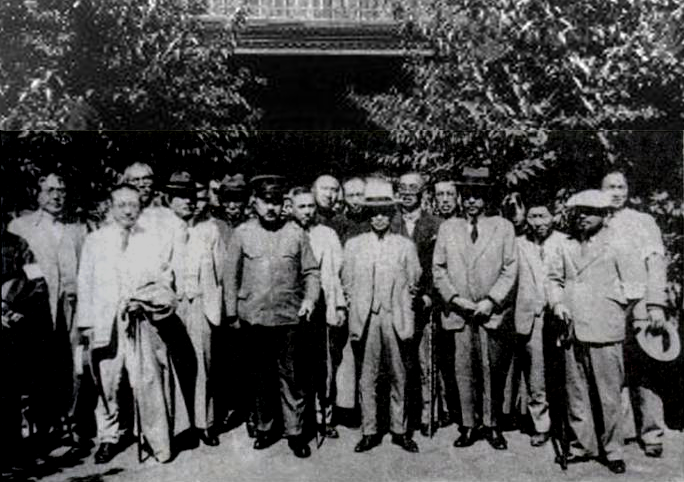
Doihara as mayor of Mukden, 1931

As Zhang Xueliang aligned himself with the Chinese Nationalist government and adopted an increasingly assertive stance against Japanese influence, it became a widely held view within the Kwantung Army that Japan should secure control of Manchuria by force, even without authorization from the Japanese government. Doihara was involved in the Mukden Incident, masterminded by his colleagues, Colonel Seishiro Itagaki and Lieutenant Colonel Kanji Ishiwara. In this incident, Japanese soldiers staged an explosion on a section of Japanese-controlled railway and falsely blamed Chinese extremists, providing a pretext for the Kwantung Army to invade. Immediately after the invasion, the Kwantung Army commander designated Doihara as provisional mayor of Mukden, whose administration had collapsed. Doihara facilitated the cooperation with the Northeastern Army Generals Xi Qia in Jilin, Zhang Jinghui in Harbin and Zhang Haipeng at Taonan in the northwest of Liaoning province.

Since neither the cabinet nor the General Staff supported a full occupation, the Kwantung Army instead pursued the creation of an ostensibly independent pro-Japanese state to secure their conquests. To give legitimacy to this endeavour Puyi, the last Emperor of China, was to be made head of this state. To carry out this plan, Doihara resigned as mayor in late October and made his way to Tianjin, where Puyi was then living in the Japanese concession. To carry out the plan, it was necessary to land Puyi at Yingkou before that port froze; therefore, he had to arrive there before 16 November 1931. With the help of the spy Yoshiko Kawashima, a relative of Puyi, he succeeded in bringing him into Manchuria within the deadline.

In early 1932, Doihara was sent to head the special service organisation of the Kwantung Army in Harbin, where he began negotiations with General Ma Zhanshan after he had been driven from Qiqihar by the Japanese. Ma's position was ambiguous; he continued negotiations while he supported Harbin-based General Ding Chao. When Doihara realized his negotiations were not going anywhere, he requested that Manchurian warlord Xi Qia advance with his forces to take Harbin from General Ding Chao. However, General Ding Chao was able to defeat Xi Qia's forces, and Doihara realized he would need Japanese forces to succeed. Doihara engineered a riot in Harbin to justify their intervention. That resulted in the IJA 12th Division under General Jirō Tamon coming from Mukden by rail and then marching through the snow to reinforce the attack. Harbin fell on 5 February 1932. By the end of February, General Ding Chao retreated into northeastern Manchuria and offered to cease hostilities, ending Chinese formal resistance. Within a month, the puppet state of Manchukuo was established.

Ma's fame as an uncompromising fighter against the Japanese invaders survived after his defeat and so Doihara made contact with him offering a huge sum of money and the command of the puppet state's army if he would defect to the new Manchurian government. Ma pretended that he agreed and flew to Mukden in February 1932, where he attended the meeting on which the state of Manchukuo was founded and was appointed War Minister of Manchukuo and Governor of Heilongjiang Province. Then, after using the Japanese funds to raise and re-equip a new volunteer force, on 1 April 1932, he led his troops to Qiqihar, re-establishing the Heilongjiang Provincial Government as part of the Republic of China and resumed the fight against the Japanese.

For the role he played in the Japanese invasion of Manchuria, Doihara received the nickname "Lawrence of Manchuria" from Western journalists, a reference to Lawrence of Arabia.

In April 1932, Doihara was promoted to Major General and given command of the 9th Infantry Brigade of IJA 5th Division. In October 1932, Doihara was sent back to again head the special service organisation in Mukden once again until 1936. In June 1935, Doihara negotiated the Qin–Doihara Agreement, allowing Japanese influence to spread in northern China and Inner Mongolia.

== Second Sino-Japanese War and Second World War ==
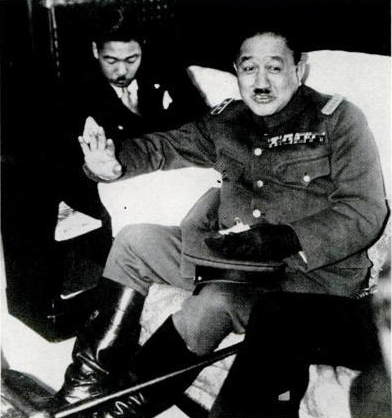
Doihara in a press photo in Tokyo during 1936, by then a Lt. General

From 1936 to 1937, Doihara was the commander of the 1st Depot Division in Japan until the Marco Polo Bridge Incident, when he was given command of the IJA 14th Division under the Japanese First Army in North China. There, he served in the Beiping–Hankou Railway Operation and spearheaded the campaign of Northern and Eastern Henan, where his division opposed the Chinese counterattack in the Battle of Lanfeng.

After the Battle of Lanfeng, Doihara was attached to the Army General Staff as head of the Doihara Special Agency until 1939, when he was given command of the Japanese Fifth Army, in Manchukuo under the overall control of the Kwantung Army. In 1940, Doihara became a member of the Supreme War Council. From 1940 to 1941, he was appointed Commandant of the Imperial Japanese Army Academy. He then became head of the Army Aeronautical Department of the Ministry of War, and Inspector-General of Army Aviation until 1943. On 4 November 1941, as a general in the Japanese Army Air Force and a member of the Supreme War Council he voted his approval of the attack on Pearl Harbor.

In 1943, Doihara was made Commander in Chief of the Eastern District Army. In 1944, he was appointed the Governor of Johor State, Malaya, and commander in chief of the Japanese Seventh Area Army in Singapore until 1945.

Returning to Japan in 1945, Doihara was promoted to Inspector-General of Military Training (one of the most prestigious positions in the Army) and commander in chief of the Japanese Twelfth Area Army. At the time of the surrender of Japan in 1945, Doihara was commander in chief of the 1st General Army.

== Prosecution and conviction ==
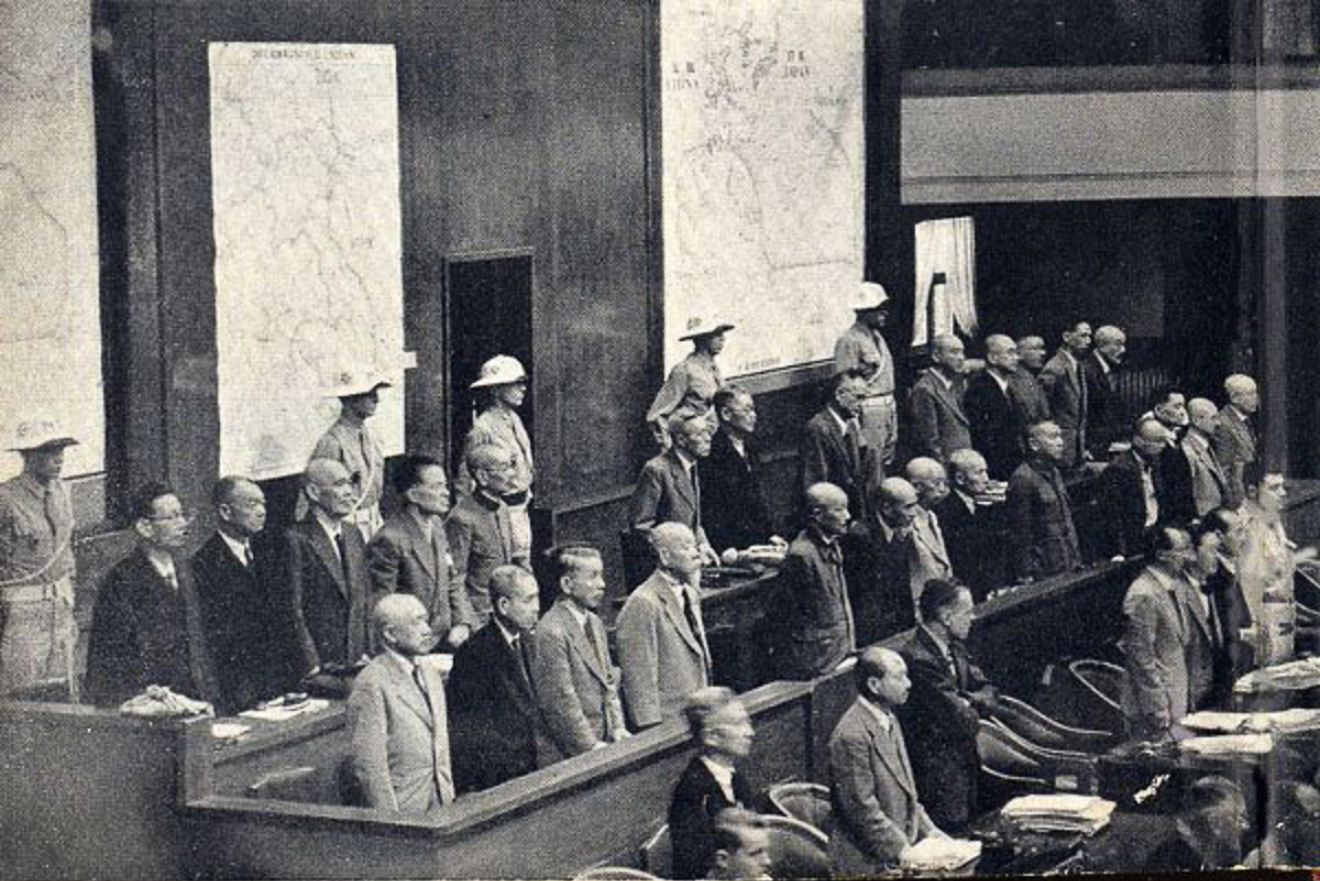
During his trial before the International Military Tribunal of the Far East. First in the front row from left to right

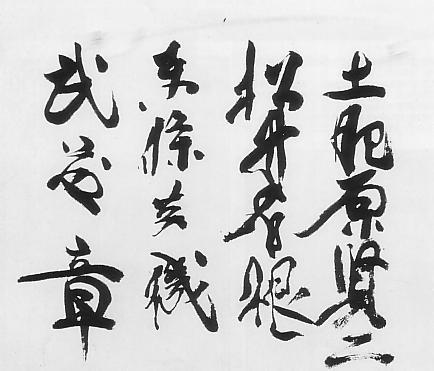
Last writing of the Class-A War Criminals (Kenji Doihara, Iwane Matsui, Hideki Tojo and Akira Muto)

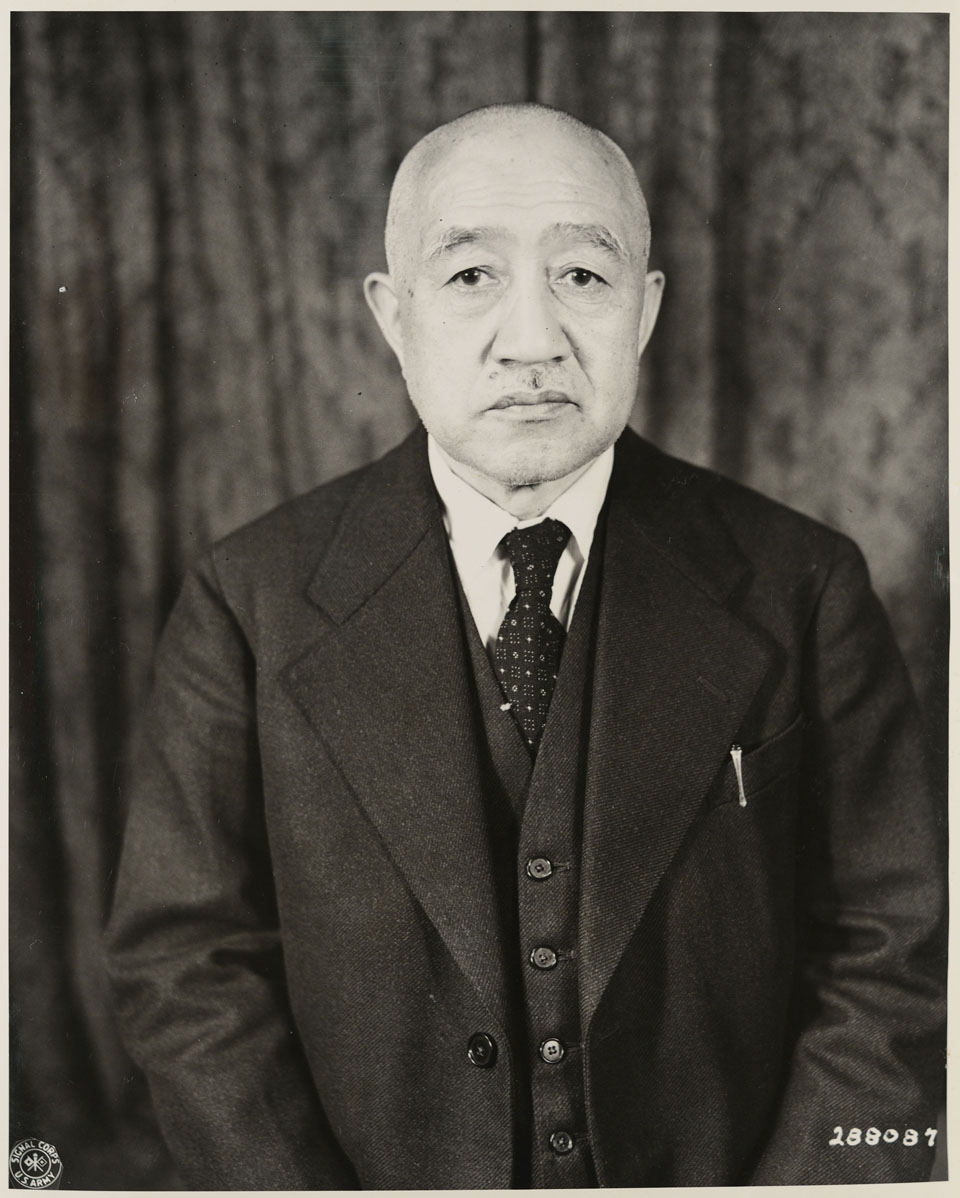
Kenji Doihara in 1948

After the surrender of Japan, he was arrested by the Allied occupation authorities and tried before the International Military Tribunal of the Far East as a Class A war criminal together with other Japanese military and civilian leaders. He was found guilty on counts 1, 27, 29, 31, 32, 35, 36, and 54 and was sentenced to death. He was hanged on 23 December 1948 at Sugamo Prison.

Military offices
| Preceded by Kotaro Nakamura | Commander, IJA Eastern District Army; May 1943 – Mar 1944 | Succeeded by Keisuke Fujie |
| Preceded by none | Commander, IJA 7th Area Army; Mar 1944 – Apr 1945 | Succeeded by Seishirō Itagaki |
| Preceded by Shunroku Hata | Inspector General of Military Training; Apr 1945 – Aug 1945 | Succeeded by Sadamu Shimomura |
| Preceded by Gen Sugiyama | Commander, IJA 1st General Army; Sept 1945 – Sept 1945 | Succeeded by Yoshijirō Umezu |
