= Jiangqiao =

Jiangqiao (江桥) may refer to:

- Jiangqiao Mongol Ethnic Town, Tailai County, Heilongjiang, China
  - Resistance at Nenjiang Bridge, battle of the Second Sino-Japanese War which occurred in the above town
  - Jiangqiao Campaign, campaign of the Second Sino-Japanese War which occurred in the above town
- Jiangqiao, Shanghai, town in Jiading District, Shanghai, China
