= Defense of Harbin =

1932 battle of the Second Sino-Japanese War

- Part of the Japanese invasion of Manchuria in the Second Sino-Japanese War and the interwar period
| Date | January 25 – February 4, 1932 (1 week and 3 days) |
| Location | Harbin city, Manchuria region, Republic of China |
| Result | Japanese victory |

Belligerents
| China | Japan |

Commanders and leaders
| (Republic of China (1912–1949)) Ding Chao | Jirō Tamon |

Units involved
| (Republic of China (1912–1949)) National Revolutionary Army | Imperial Japanese Army |

Strength
| 30,000 | Unknown |

Casualties and losses
| 1,800 | Unknown |

The Defense of Harbin (simplified Chinese: 哈尔滨保卫战; traditional Chinese: 哈爾濱保衛戰) was a military conflict fought between the Republic of China and the Empire of Japan. It took place during the Japanese invasion of Manchuria in 1932 and ended with the Japanese taking the city after a long battle in freezing weather.

== Background ==
After General Ma Zhanshan had been driven from Qiqihar by the Japanese in the Jiangqiao Campaign, he retreated northeast with his depleted forces and set up his headquarters at Hailun from which he attempted to continue to govern Heilongjiang Province. Colonel Kenji Doihara began negotiations with General Ma from his Special Service Office at Harbin, hoping to get him to defect to the new state of Manchukuo. Ma remained in an ambiguous position by continuing negotiations with the Japanese while he continued to support General Ding Chao.

General Ding Chao had never approved of the puppet government set up in Jilin Province by the Kwantung Army under the nominal leadership of General Xi Qia of the Jilin Army. In November 1932, with Colonel Feng Zhanhai, he organized the “Jilin Provincial Anti-Japanese Government” to coordinate military resistance. Military and civil authorities in the province fractured into "New Jilin" adherents of the Xi Qia regime and loyalist "Old Jilin" elements in opposition to it, The former predominated near the capital, and the latter predominated in Harbin and the rugged hinterland to the north and the east.

Over the next months, General Ma Zhanshan continued to support General Ding, and both generals maintained contact with Marshal Zhang Xueliang and Chiang Kai-shek, who gave them some limited assistance. In early January 1932, in an effort to force General Ma to terms, Doihara requested for General Xi Qia to advance with his "New Jilin Army" to take Harbin and then to advance in the direction of Ma's headquarters at Hailun. However, the forces of the Jilin Self-Defence Army, organized by General Ding and General Li Du at Harbin, were between General Xi Qia and Harbin. General Ding appealed to Harbin's Chinese residents to join his railway garrison regulars.

When General Xi's New Jilin Army had advanced to Shuangcheng on 25 January, Marshal Zhang Xueliang instructed Generals Ma and Ding not stop negotiating. Fighting began on the morning of the 26th. Doihara had failed in his attempt to intimidate. Worse still, his ally General Xi had suffered a serious reverse at the hands of General Ding's forces.

== Harbin Incident ==
To justify the direct intervention of the Kwantung Army to assist General Xi Qia, Colonel Doihara engineered a riot in Harbin. During the uprising, one Japanese and three Korean subjects of Japan were killed. Although most Japanese forces had been withdrawn from northern Manchuria for use in the Jinzhou Operation, the 2nd Infantry Division, commanded by Lieutenant General Jirō Tamon, had returned to Mukden for a rest.

On receiving orders to go to the rescue of General Xi Qia, the 2nd Division entrained on the same day that the January 28 Incident began. Some delays were experienced because of transportation difficulties in the cold winter weather. That gave General Ding Chao time to seize the Municipal Administration in Harbin and arrest pro-Japanese Governor of Heilongjiang General Zhang Jinghui.

From Qiqihar, the newly-arrived Japanese 4th Mixed Brigade moved in from the east. For seven days, Japanese columns struggled over the frozen countryside in freezing temperatures of -30 degrees celsius. Finally, they closed in on the city from the west and south on February 4.

== Battle of Harbin ==
General Ding Chao fought a 17-hour battle, which Harbin's inhabitants watched from their rooftops. Possibly in an effort to embroil the Soviet Union, General Ding's artillery was posted in front of the offices of the Soviet-dominated Chinese Eastern Railroad but to no effect.

Ding's men, many of whom were poorly equipped and untrained civilian volunteers, finally broke under the fire from Japanese guns and the bombing and strafing by Japanese aircraft. Ding was forced to retreat from Harbin to the northeast, down the Sungari River, and was pursued by Japanese aircraft. Within a few hours, the Japanese occupation of Harbin had been completed.

== Aftermath ==
Doihara offered Ma Zhanshan one million dollars in gold to defect to the new Manchukuo Imperial Army. After General Ding had been defeated, Ma agreed on 14 February 1932 and retained his post as Governor of Heilongjiang Province in exchange for co-operating with the Japanese.

On February 27, 1932, General Ding offered to cease hostilities, ending official Chinese resistance in Manchuria.

Within days, Henry Puyi, the former Manchurian emperor of China, deposed in 1911, was made emperor of the puppet state of Manchukuo by the resolution of an all-Manchuria Convention in Mukden (today's Shenyang), whose members included General Ma, who had been flown in from the north. The next day, on March 1, the Manchukuo Government established with General Ma as its Minister of War, in addition to his post as provincial governor.

== Bibliography ==
- Coogan, Anthony (1994). Northeast China and the Origins of the Anti-Japanese United Front. Modern China, Vol. 20, No. 3 (Jul., 1994), pp. 282–314: Sage Publications.
- Matsusaka, Yoshihisa Tak (2003). The Making of Japanese Manchuria, 1904–1932. Harvard University Asia Center. ISBN 0-674-01206-2.
- Rugui, Guo (2005). 中国抗日战争正面战场作战记 [China's Anti-Japanese War Combat Operations]. Jiangsu People's Publishing House. ISBN 7-214-03034-9.
