= 2nd Division (Imperial Japanese Army) =

1888–1945 Imperial Japanese Army formation

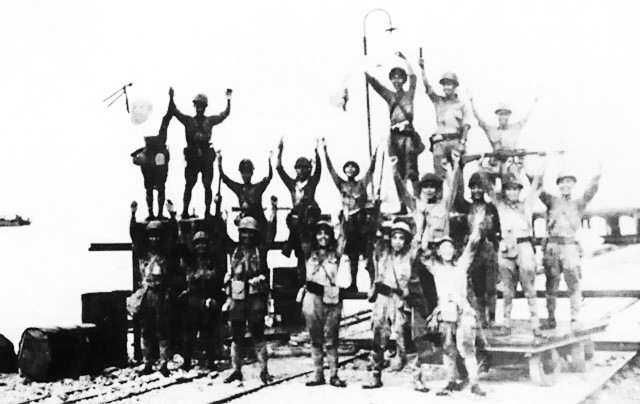
- The IJA 2nd Division celebrates landing at Merak, Java during World War II.
- Active: 1888–1945
- Country: Empire of Japan
- Branch: Imperial Japanese Army
- Type: Infantry
- Garrison/HQ: Sendai, Miyagi, Japan
- Nickname: "Courageous Division"
- Engagements: First Sino-Japanese War: Battle of Seonghwan; Battle of Lushunkou; Russo-Japanese War: Battle of Yalu River (1904); Battle of Motien Pass; Battle of Liaoyang; Battle of Shaho; Battle of Sandepu; Battle of Mukden; World War II: Battle of Khalkhin Gol; Battle of Java; Guadalcanal campaign; Battle of Central Burma

Commanders
- Notable commanders: Sakuma Samata; Nogi Maresuke; Nishi Kanjiro; Prince Higashikuni Naruhiko; Yoshijiro Umezu; Yasuji Okamura; Masao Maruyama

The 2nd Division (第2師団, Dai-ni shidan) was an infantry division in the Imperial Japanese Army. Its tsūshōgō was Courageous Division (勇兵団, Isamu-heidan).

== History ==
The 2nd Division was formed in Sendai, Miyagi, in January 1871 as the Sendai Garrison (仙台鎮台, Sendai chindai), one of six regional commands created in the fledgling Imperial Japanese Army. The Sendai Garrison had responsibility for northern Honshū (the Tohoku region), ranging from Fukushima Prefecture in the south to Aomori Prefecture in the north. The six regional commands were transformed into divisions under the army reorganization of 14 May 1888.

The headquarters of the 2nd Division was located in the Ni-no-maru of Sendai Castle, where the campus of Tohoku University is now located. Its original composition included the 4th Infantry Regiment (raised in Sendai), 5th Infantry Regiment (raised in Aomori), 16th Infantry Regiment (raised in Shibata) and the 17th Infantry Regiment (raised in Akita). In the reorganization prior to World War II, the 29th Infantry Regiment (raised in Wakamatsu) was added.

=== First Sino-Japanese War and the Russo-Japanese War ===
The 2nd Division saw combat during the First Sino-Japanese War at the Battle of Weihaiwei. Following the end of the First Sino-Japanese War, elements of the 2nd Division were used to form the core of the new IJA 7th Division based in Hokkaido and the IJA 8th Division based in Hirosaki, Aomori. Likewise, the 2nd Division was active in most of the major battles of the Russo-Japanese War as part of General Kuroki Tamemoto's First Army, including the Battle of Liaoyang, Battle of Shaho and Battle of Mukden, and gained a reputation for excellence in night operations.

Some of its more noteworthy commanders included Sakuma Samata, Nogi Maresuke, Nishi Kanjiro, HIH Prince Higashikuni Naruhiko, and Umezu Yoshijiro.

=== Second Sino-Japanese War and Soviet–Japanese border conflicts ===
From 1930 to 1933, the 2nd Division was under the command of Lieutenant-General Jiro Tamon. In 1931, it was transferred to the Kwantung Army in Manchuria, it took the lead in the initial operations of the invasion of Manchuria, then in the Jiangqiao Campaign, Jinzhou Operation, and in overcoming the defense of Harbin, following the Mukden Incident.

After the Second Sino-Japanese War started in July 1937, 15th Mixed Brigade from the 2nd Division saw combat in the invasion of Chahar, in August 1937, and in the Battle of Xuzhou (March 1938) where 3rd Infantry Brigade was temporarily assigned to the North China Area Army.

Later in 1939, the 2nd Division was under 3rd Army which was facing the southern half of the border of the Maritime province of the Soviet Union from Korea northward. The Katayama Detachment from 2nd Division, (consisting of the 15th Infantry Brigade, with 16th and 30th Infantry Regiments, and a field artillery battalion) fought small actions near Akiyama heights, or Heights 997 on 6–10 September 1939, in the closing stages of the Battle of Khalkhin Gol 2nd Division (and the 4th Division) as part of the Japanese Sixth Army. Because the projected counterattack that was canceled when a ceasefire was signed 16 September 1939, the fighting ceased.

=== Pacific War ===
The 2nd Division, led by Masao Maruyama, was reassigned to the southern front under Field Marshal Terauchi Hisaichi's Southern Area Army, and was one of the divisions which occupied the Dutch East Indies. In particular, it landed in the Port of Merak on western Java 1 March 1942, proceeding to Bandung on 9 March 1942. After the surrender of Dutch forces, the 2nd Division was transferred to Rabaul 13 September 1942. The Aoba Detachment split from the division and was briefly considered for deployment during the New Guinea Campaign in late August 1942, but it soon rejoined the division as the situation at Guadalcanal deteriorated. On 1–5 October 1942, the division landed on the west coast of Matanikau River on Guadalcanal, resulting in the Actions along the Matanikau. The 2nd Division lost at least 700 troops at that time. The Battle for Henderson Field which started 24 October 1942, resulted in crippling losses for the division, as all Japanese attacks were repulsed. The division's total losses in the disastrous Battle of Guadalcanal in the Solomon Islands was over 7,000 men. Afterwards, the 2nd Division was assigned to garrison duties in occupied Malaya and Singapore.

In 1944, its Guadalcanal losses replaced, the division was ordered to Burma to resist the British reoccupation. After performing coastal duties in Arakan the division was reassigned directly to Burma Area Army in May. Used as a strategic reserve it was largely annihilated in the subsequent conflict. Its remnants were assigned to the Japanese 38th Army in French Indochina, and disbanded at the end of World War II in Saigon.

== Assignments ==
- April 1931: Kwantung Army, Manchuria.

Operated in the Invasion of Manchuria and later the Pacification of Manchukuo.

- 10 February 1937: Kwantung Army, Manchukuo.

Detached 15th Mixed Brigade served in Operation Chahar.

- 21 July 1938: 3rd Army, Kwantung Army, Manchukuo.
  Detached 15th Mixed Brigade served in Nomonhan/Khalkhin Gol Campaign.
- 27 September 1940: Eastern Army, Japan.
- 6 November 1941: 16th Army, Japan.

For the operation against Java.

- August 1942: 17th Army, Solomon Islands.
  Guadalcanal campaign
- January 1944: 28th Army, South Burma.
- February 1945: 38th Army, Indochina.

== See also ==
- List of Japanese Infantry Divisions

== Sources ==
- Madej, W. Victor, Japanese Armed Forces Order of Battle, 1937-1945 [2 vols], Allentown, PA: 1981.
- Coox, Alvin D., Nomonhan, Japan Against Russia, 1939. Stanford University Press, Stanford, CA: 1985. ISBN 0-8047-1835-0
- Rottman, Gordon L. (2005). Duncan Anderson (ed.). Japanese Army in World War II: The South Pacific and New Guinea, 1942–43. Oxford and New York: Osprey. ISBN 1-84176-870-7.
