= Resistance at Nenjiang Bridge =

Battle of the Second Sino-Japanese War

- Part of Jiangqiao Campaign as part of the Japanese invasion of Manchuria in the Second Sino-Japanese War and the interwar period
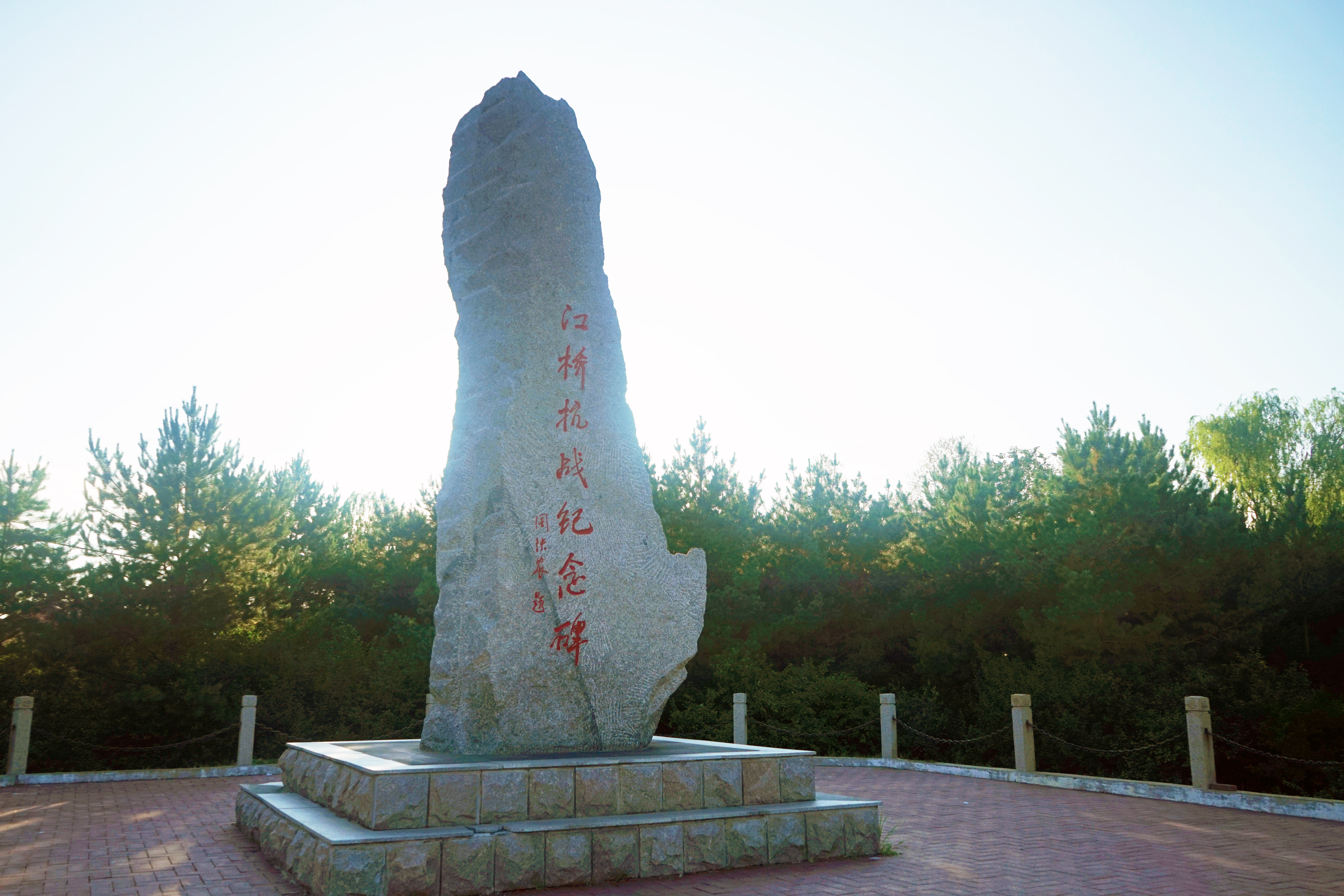
- Monument of the Resistance
Date	4 November 1931
Location	Vicinity of Nen River Bridge, South of Qiqihar city, Manchuria region, Republic of China
Result	Japanese victory

Belligerents
(Empire of Japan) Japan	(Republic of China (1912–1949)) China

Commanders and leaders
Shogo Hasebe	Ma Zhanshan

Strength
800	2,500

Casualties and losses
350	150

The Resistance at Nenjiang Bridge was a small battle fought between forces of the Chinese National Revolutionary Army against the Imperial Japanese Army and collaborationist forces, after the Mukden Incident during the Invasion of Manchuria in 1931, prior to the start of the Second Sino-Japanese War. It marked the start of the Jiangqiao Campaign.

== Background ==
In November 1931, the acting governor of Heilongjiang province General Ma Zhanshan chose to disobey the Kuomintang government's ban on further resistance to the Japanese invasion and attempted to prevent Japanese forces from crossing into Heilongjiang province by defending a strategic railway bridge across the Nen River near Jiangqiao. This bridge had been dynamited earlier by Ma's forces during the fighting against the pro-Japanese collaborationist forces of General Chang Hai-Peng.

== Battle ==
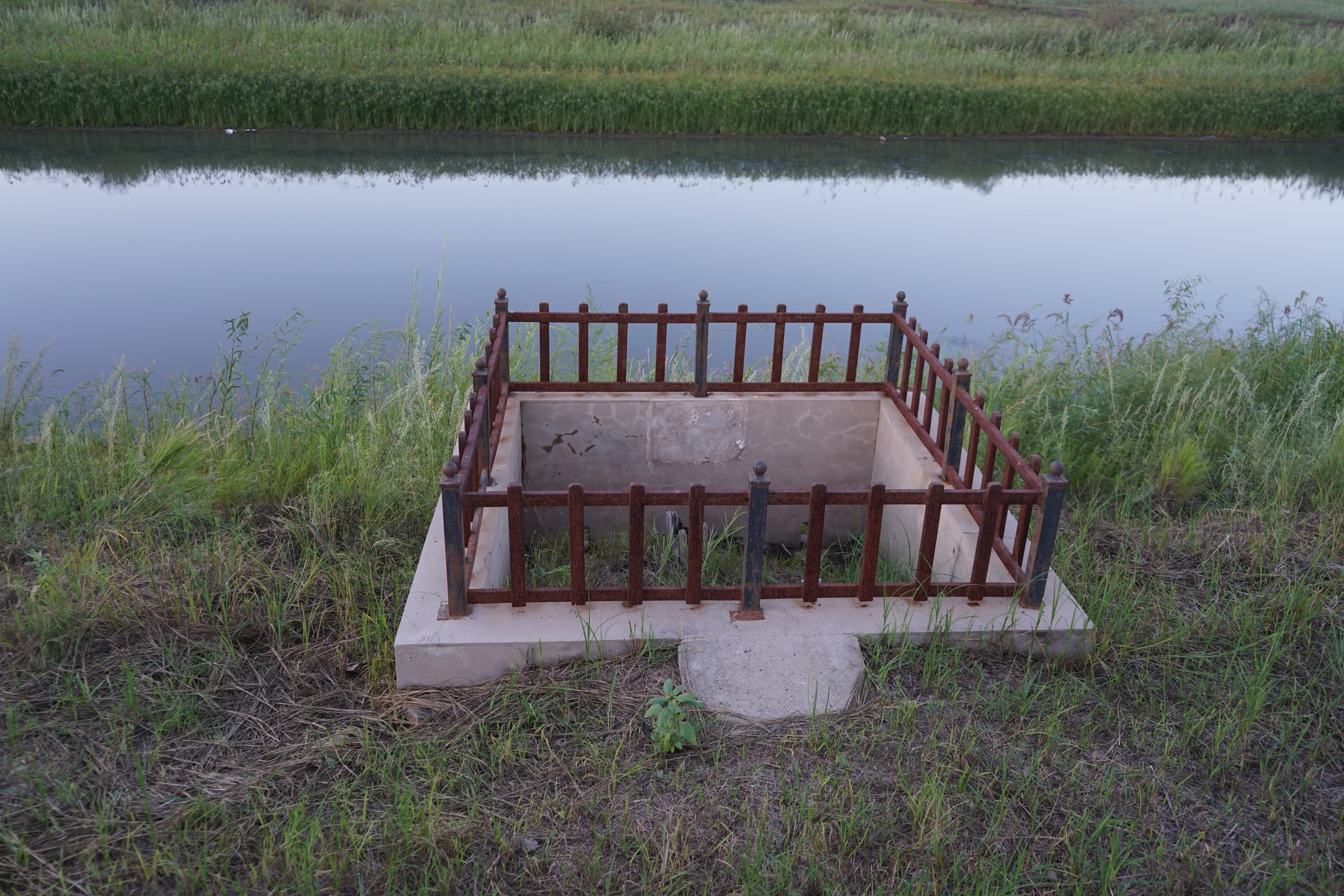
Ruins of the Nenjiang Harge Bridge, where the battle was fought.

A repair crew, guarded by 800 Japanese soldiers, went to work on 4 November 1931. Nearby were 2,500 Chinese troops under General Ma Zhanshan. Each side charged the other with opening fire without provocation. The Japanese claimed the Chinese opened fire using rifles and machine guns late in the day during a fog when Japanese troops started across the span. The Japanese retaliated and the skirmish continued for over three hours. Only 15 Japanese were reported killed and 120 Chinese, as the Japanese advanced and drove General Ma's remaining troops off toward Qiqihar.

Later, General Ma Zhanshan returned to counterattack with a much larger force. Although he managed to dislodge the Japanese from their advanced positions, he was unable to recapture the bridge, which the Japanese continued to repair. Eventually, Ma was forced to withdraw his troops in the face of Japanese tanks and artillery.

== Consequences ==
The repaired bridge made possible the further advance of Japanese forces and their armored trains.

Despite his failure to hold the bridge, General Ma Zhanshan became a national hero in China for his resistance at Nenjiang Bridge, which was widely reported in the Chinese and international press. The publicity inspired more volunteers to enlist in the Anti-Japanese Volunteer Armies. Although often led by army officers and with numbers of former regular troops among their ranks, most volunteers had no previous military experience. These irregular armies were to later become the main anti-Japanese force in northeast China during 1932 and posed a serious obstacle to Japanese attempts to pacify the country.

== See also ==
- Jiangqiao Campaign
- Japanese invasion of Manchuria
