= Tangchi =

Tangchi (汤池镇) may refer to the following towns in China:

- Tangchi, Heilongjiang
- Tangchi, Dandong, Zhenxing District, Liaoning
- Tangchi, Dashiqiao, Dashiqiao, Liaoning
