= Katayama Detachment =

The Katayama Detachment (Japanese: 片山支隊) was a task force of the 2nd Division of the Imperial Japanese Army during the Soviet–Japanese border conflicts of 1939. It was commanded by Major general Shotaro Katayama (片山省太郎). The detachment fought small actions near Akiyama heights, or Heights 997 during 6–10 September 1939. The 2nd Division, along with the 4th Division, was attached to Sixth Army during the Battle of Khalkhin Gol as reinforcements for a projected counterattack that was canceled when a ceasefire was signed.

== Component units ==
Katayama Detachment:

- 15th Infantry Brigade
  - 16th Infantry Regiment
  - 30th Infantry Regiment
- 1 Field Artillery battalion

== Sources ==
- Coox, Alvin D. Nomonhan, Japan Against Siberia, 1939. Stanford, CA: Stanford University Press, 1985.
