= Nemor River =

Location
- Country: Heilongjiang, China

Physical characteristics
- Mouth
  - coordinates: 48°19′18″N 124°33′12″E
- Length: 569 kilometers

Nemor River
- Simplified Chinese: 訥謨爾河
- Traditional Chinese: 讷谟尔河
- Hanyu Pinyin: Nèmó'ěr hé

The Nemor River (Chinese: 讷谟尔河), sometimes spelled Nemo'er River, also known as Nemoer River, Namoer River, is a river located in the north-central part of Heilongjiang Province of the People's Republic of China. It is a tributary of the left bank of the Nen River, and is a seasonal river.

Nemor River originates near the Shuanglong Spring (双龙泉) of Fulun Mountain (佛伦山) at the southern foot of the Lesser Khingan, and eventually drains into the Nen River. The river is 569 kilometers long, with a watershed area of 13, 945 square kilometers and an average annual runoff of 1.548 billion cubic meters.
