= Jilin Self-Defence Army =

1930s anti-Japanese volunteer army

- Simplified Chinese: 吉林自卫军
- Traditional Chinese: 吉林自衛軍
Transcriptions
Standard Mandarin
- Hanyu Pinyin: Jílín Zìwèijūn

The Jilin Self-Defence Army was an anti-Japanese volunteer army formed in 1931 to defend local Chinese residents against the Japanese invasion of northeast China. General Ding Chao, Li Du, Feng Zhanhai, Xing Zhanqing, and Zhao Yi organised the Jilin Self-Defence Army in order to prevent the fall and occupation of Harbin city, Jilin province. This brought all their forces under a unified command. Calling for civilians to form volunteer units and join in the defense of the city, the army reached a strength of 30,000 men in six brigades of Zhang Xueliangs Northeastern army.

Jilin Self-Defense Corps – Commander-in-Chief Li Du

- Frontline commander-in-chief – Wang Yu
- Chief of the general staff – Yang Yaojun
- Chinese Eastern Railroad Defense Army – Commander-in-Chief – Ding Chao
  - 28th Brigade – Ding Chao
- 22nd Brigade – Zhao Yi
- 25th Brigade – Ma Xianzhang
- 26th Brigade – Song Wenjun
- 29th Brigade – Wang Ruihua
- Temporary 1st Brigade – Feng Zhanhai
- 1st Cavalry Brigade – Gong Changhai
- 2nd Cavalry Brigade – Yao Dianchen
- Wooded Mountain Guerrilla Force – Song Xizeng

The defense of Harbin was at first successful and succeeded in repulsing the Manchukuo forces sent against them for a time. After its initial success, the army was forced out of Harbin when the Japanese sent their own troops under Jiro Tamon.

Ding Chao's beaten Jilin Self-Defence Army retired from Harbin and marched to the northeast down the Songhua River, to join the Lower Songhua garrison of General Li Du and together reorganized, swelling its ranks with volunteers to 30,000 men in nine brigades by April 1932. It continued to resist, occupying the towns along the eastern section of the Chinese Eastern Railway, between Harbin and the Soviet border.

Feng Zhanhai, former regimental commander of the Jilin Guards Division, retreating from Harbin into the west of Jilin province raised a sizeable independent volunteer force, the Northeastern Loyal and Brave Army estimated by the Japanese as 15,000 men in June 1932.

== See also ==
- Pacification of Manchukuo
- Second Sino-Japanese War
