= Jiangqiao campaign =

1931 military campaign in China

- Part of the Japanese invasion of Manchuria in the Second Sino-Japanese War and the interwar period
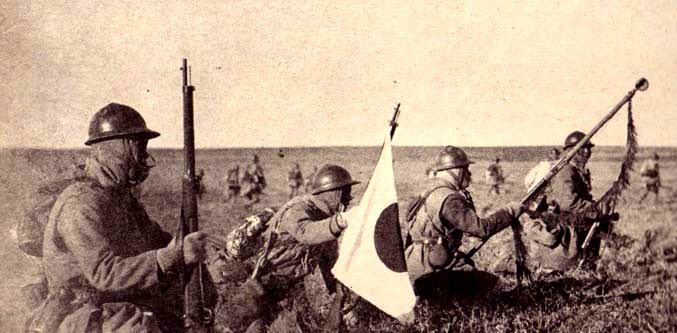
- Japanese infantry advances in Manchuria after the Mukden Incident
Date	November 4–18, 1931 (2 weeks)
Location	Heilongjiang province, Manchuria region, Republic of China
Result	Japanese victory

Belligerents
(Republic of China (1912–1949)) Republic of China: (Republic of China (1912–1949)) National Revolutionary Army	Empire of Japan: (Empire of Japan) Imperial Japanese Army

Commanders and leaders
Ma Zhanshan	Jirō Tamon

Strength
23,000	3,500

Casualties and losses
Japanese estimate : 3,000 Chinese investigation of dead army personnel and civilians since the Mukden Incident; In Heilongjiang Province from 5 November until 20 November 1931 : Northeastern Army : 5,811 dead Police force : 16 dead	300
- 958 Chinese civilians dead

The Jiangqiao campaign was a series of battles and skirmishes occurring after the Mukden Incident, during the invasion of Manchuria by the Imperial Japanese Army, prior to the Second Sino-Japanese War.

== Background ==
After the Mukden Incident, the Japanese Kwantung Army quickly overran the provinces of Liaoning and Jilin, occupying major cities and railways. At that time, the Chairman Wan Fulin of Heilongjiang Province was in Beijing, leaving the provincial government leaderless. Zhang Xueliang telegraphed the Kuomintang government in Nanjing for instructions, and then appointed General Ma Zhanshan as acting chairman and Military Commander-in-chief of Heilongjiang Province on October 16, 1931.

General Ma Zhanshan arrived in the capital Qiqihar on October 19 and took office the next day. He held military meetings and personally inspected the defense positions while facing down parties who wished to surrender, saying “I am appointed as Chairman of the Province, and I have the responsibility to defend the Province and I will never be a surrendering general".

== Resistance at Nenjiang Bridge ==
In November 1931, General Ma Zhanshan chose to disobey the Kuomintang government's ban on further resistance to the Japanese invasion and attempted to prevent Japanese forces from crossing into Heilongjiang province by defending a strategic railway bridge across the Nen River near Jiangqiao. This bridge had been dynamited earlier by Ma's forces during the fighting against pro-Japanese collaborationist forces of General Zhang Haipeng.

A repair crew, guarded by 800 Japanese soldiers, went to work on 4 November 1931, but fighting soon erupted with the 2,500 Chinese troops nearby. Each side charged the other with opening fire without provocation. The skirmish continued for over three hours, until the Japanese drove General Ma's troops off toward Qiqihar.

Later General Ma Zhanshan returned to counterattack with a much larger force. Japanese Major General Shogo Hasebe, had the sluggish river on his left, the railway on his right. Wide swamplands made the Japanese left wing impregnable, forcing Ma to concentrate his cavalry against the exposed Japanese right wing. Although dislodging the Japanese from their advance positions, Ma was unable to recapture the bridge, which the Japanese continued to repair. Ma was eventually forced to withdraw his troops in the face of Japanese tanks and artillery.

Ma became a national hero for his resistance to the Japanese which was widely reported in the Chinese and international press. The publicity inspired more volunteers to enlist in the Anti-Japanese Volunteer Armies.

== Battle of Qiqihar ==
On November 15, 1931, despite having lost more than 400 killed and 300 wounded since November 5, General Ma declined a Japanese ultimatum to surrender Qiqihar. On the November 17, in subzero weather, 3,500 Japanese troops of the 2nd division, under the command of General Jiro Tamon, mounted an attack on Qiqihar's 8,000 defenders along a five-mile front on the heights of San-chien-fang south of Tangchi.

Japanese cavalry charged down the Chinese front line cutting a swath into which Japanese infantry followed. Ma's right flank held at first. The Chinese cavalry tried to encircle the Japanese right flank, but were stopped by Japanese artillery and close air support. The superior Japanese firepower turned the battle. Chinese units broke and fled across the frozen steppes.

On November 18, Ma evacuated Qiqihar. By November 19, he led his troops to the east to defend Baiquan and Hailun. His forces had suffered serious casualties and their strength was now much reduced. However once Ma was forced to retire up the Nonni River valley, he managed to regroup his forces and maintain their morale. Japanese troops attempting to press Ma's men further up the Nonni River towards Koshen in the cold suffered large casualties on several occasions.

At the same time the Japanese began their occupation of Qiqihar, securing control of all three Manchurian provincial capitals. At Mukden and Kirin the Japanese had already established collaborationist Chinese governments. At Qiqihar they established another government under pro-Japanese General Zhang Jinghui. Japan also secured control of the central section of the Chinese Eastern Railway, however, the eastern section was still under the control of General Ding Chao in Harbin.

== See also ==
- Second Sino-Japanese War
- Mukden Incident
