= Wu Yicheng =

Wu Yicheng (simplified Chinese: 吴义成; traditional Chinese: 吳義成; pinyin: Wú Yìchéng; 1887 – 1949), one of Wang Delins companions who had been with him for many years as a bandit, was made one of Wang's company commanders along with Kong Xianrong, when Wang was taken into the Kirin Provincial army and became a battalion commander. Wang Delin refused to submit to the Japanese during the invasion of Manchuria in 1931 and formed the Chinese People's National Salvation Army, Wu became a subordinate leader of one of the largest and most successful of the volunteer armies.

After the Army of Wang Delin retreated from Manchukuo, it was not the end of the volunteer resistance. Wu and others did not flee and fought on as small guerrilla units, frequently called shanlin. Survival was difficult and some resorted to banditry on occasion. But most were genuine anti-Japanese forces, and continued to harass the Japanese and Manchukuo forces for many years. Wu Yicheng fought on with a small band of followers until 1937.

== Sources ==
- "The volunteer armies of northeast China". Archived from the original on 2011-06-04 – via Questia.
