= Nishi Kanjirō =

Viscount Nishi Kanjirō
- 西 寛二郎
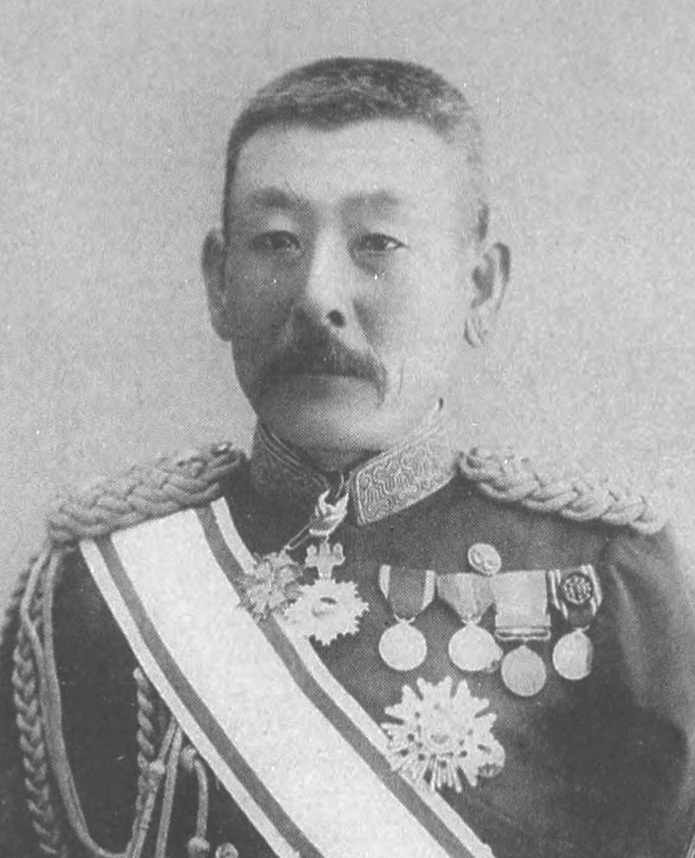
- Born: 5 April 1846; Satsuma Domain, Japan
- Died: 27 January 1912 (aged 65); Tokyo, Japan
- Military career
- Allegiance: Empire of Japan
- Branch: Imperial Japanese Army
- Service years: 1871–1911
- Rank: General
- Conflicts: Boshin War; Satsuma Rebellion; First Sino-Japanese War; Russo-Japanese War
- Awards: Order of the Rising Sun, 1st class

Viscount Nishi Kanjirō (西 寛二郎; 5 April 1846 – 27 January 1912) was a career soldier in the early Imperial Japanese Army, serving during the Russo-Japanese War.

== Biography ==
Nishi was born as the son of a samurai of Satsuma Domain (present-day Kagoshima Prefecture), and as a youth was in the service of Shimazu Hisamitsu. He participated in the Battle of Toba–Fushimi during the Boshin War. Joining the fledgling Imperial Japanese Army in July 1871, he was made a battalion commander, and was promoted to major in December 1873. He subsequently participated in the suppression of the Saga Rebellion, the Taiwan Expedition of 1874, and the Satsuma Rebellion of 1877. Afterwards, he was assigned to the Imperial Japanese Army General Staff Office until February 1881. After a brief command of the IJA 11th Infantry Regiment, he was promoted to colonel in 1882 and to major general in 1889.

During the First Sino-Japanese War, Nishi commanded the IJA 2nd Infantry Brigade during the invasion of the Liaodong Peninsula in Manchuria. In August 1895, he was made a baron (danshaku) in the kazoku peerage system. In May 1896, he was commander of the Japanese occupation forces in Weihaiwei, in Shandong Province of China. Promoted to lieutenant general in October of the same year, he followed Nogi Maresuke as commander of the 2nd Infantry Division. He deployed with the division back to Manchuria in February 1904 at the start of the Russo-Japanese War and participated in the Battle of the Yalu, the capture of Antung, and the Battle of Liaoyang. He was promoted to full general in June of the same year. In April 1905, he was awarded the Order of the Golden Kite, 1st class. From May 1905, he was head of the Inspectorate General of Military Training, one of the three most powerful posts in the Japanese Army. Nishi was appointed aide-de-camp to the Prince Fushimi Sadanaru on his trip to Europe in 1907, and on his return was elevated to viscount (shishaku).

Nishi entered the reserves in March 1911 and died in January the following year. On his death, he was posthumously awarded the Grand Cordon of the Order of the Rising Sun, Paulownia Flowers. His grave is at the Aoyama Cemetery in Tokyo.
