= Gan River (Inner Mongolia) =

Tributary of Nen River in China

- Simplified Chinese: 甘河
- Literal meaning: Sweet River
Transcriptions
Standard Mandarin
- Hanyu Pinyin: Gānhé
- Wade–Giles: Kan He

Gan River or Gan He is a tributary of the Nen River in Inner Mongolia, China. It flows 446 km from the east flank of the Greater Khingan Range into the Nen River at Nenjiang, through the Morin Dawa Daur and the Oroqin Autonomous Banner of the vast Hulunbuir Municipality. It drains an area of over 20,000 km^{2} of mostly hills and plains. The Gan River basin is traditionally home to semi-nomadic Daur and Oroqen people.
