= Jinzhou Operation =

1931–32 Japanese invasion of Manchuria operation

Jinzhou (Chinchow) Operation
- Part of the Japanese invasion of Manchuria in the Second Sino-Japanese War and the interwar period
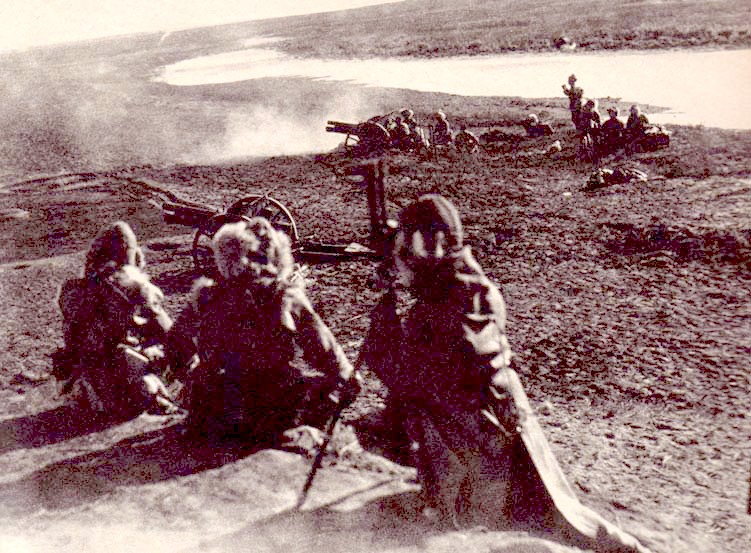
- Japanese artillery in Manchuria after the Mukden incident
Date	December 21, 1931 – January 3, 1932 (1 week and 6 days)
Location	Liaoning province, Manchuria region, Republic of China
Result	Japanese victory

Belligerents
(Republic of China (1912–1949)) Republic of China; (Republic of China (1912–1949)) National Revolutionary Army; Anti-Japanese guerrillas	Empire of Japan; (Empire of Japan) Imperial Japanese Army

Commanders and leaders
Zhang Xueliang	Jirō Tamon

Strength
84,000 men	12,000 men

Casualties and losses
Japanese estimate: 3,000 Chinese investigation of dead army personnel and civilians since the Mukden incident In Liaoning Province from 21 December 1931 until 1 January 1932: Northeastern Army: 1,377 dead Anti-Japanese Volunteer Armies: 2,227 dead	300
- 1,006 Chinese civilians dead

The Jinzhou Operation, or Chinchow Operation, was an operation in 1931 during the Japanese invasion of Manchuria, which was a preliminary, contributing factor to the outbreak of the Second Sino-Japanese War in 1937.

== Background ==
In late November 1931, Imperial Japanese Army commander in chief General Shigeru Honjō dispatched 10,000 soldiers in 13 armored trains, escorted by a squadron of bombers, in an advance on Jinzhou from Mukden. This force advanced to within 30 kilometers of Chinchow when it received an order to withdraw. The operation was cancelled by Japanese War Minister General Jirō Minami, due to the acceptance of modified form of a League of Nations proposal for a "neutral zone" to be established as a buffer zone between the Republic of China proper and Manchuria pending a future China-Japanese peace conference by the civilian government of Prime Minister Wakatsuki Reijirō in Tokyo.

However the two sides failed to reach a lasting agreement. The Wakatsuki government soon fell and was replaced by a new cabinet led by Prime Minister Tsuyoshi Inukai. Further negotiations with the Kuomintang government failing, the Japanese government approved an increase in the military forces in Manchuria. In December, the rest of the 20th Infantry Division, along with the 38th Mixed Brigade of the 19th Infantry Division were sent into Manchuria from Korea while the 8th Mixed Brigade, 10th Infantry Division was sent from Japan.

Following the defeat of General Ma Zhanshan in Heilongjiang province, and in anticipation of reinforcements, a new Japanese offensive was launched in Manchuria on December 21. General Honjo insisted that his troops were moving out "to clear the country of bandits," and added that the Chinese evacuation of Chinchow was "absolutely imperative". Most of the "bandits" were actually the organizing Anti-Japanese Volunteer Armies but some real bandits were also exploiting the chaos following the collapse of the Chinese government and its Northeastern Army following the Mukden incident and the Japanese invasion of Manchuria.

== Japanese advance ==
While the other Japanese forces and collaborationist Manchurian troops spread out from their bases along the South Manchurian Railway rail lines to clear the countryside, from Mukden, the Japanese headquarters in Manchuria, the brigades of the 12th Infantry Division advanced southward in the night, supported by squadrons of Japanese bombers to force the Chinese to evacuate Jinzhou.

The Japanese estimated the Chinese at Jinzhou had 84,000 defenders, with 58 artillery pieces placed to support two separate systems of entrenchments defending the city. The Chinese first defensive line, 20 miles north of the city, was a series of trenches aimed to stop the Japanese advance at the Taling River Bridge on the Peiping-Mukden Railway. The Chinese had a second line of earthworks and entrenchments completely encircling Jinzhou to fall back on if the Japanese forces broke through the first line.

Japanese Lieutenant General Jirō Tamon's troops cautiously advanced south from Mukden. The temperature was 30 below zero, and Japanese forces were camouflaged in white. Japanese reconnaissance aircraft reported a force of at least 3,000 Chinese "bandits" waiting to defend Panshan County. Brushing aside these Chinese skirmishers in a series of minor clashes, Tamon prepared to meet and crush the first serious Chinese resistance, expected at Goubangzi, 50 kilometers north of Jinzhou.

By the evening of December 31, 1931, the Japanese advance guard was fifteen kilometers from Jinzhou on the banks of the Taling River. General Tamon halted briefly to bring up the rest of his 2nd Division, for the final drive on Jinzhou. The Japanese War Office announced in a radio broadcast "The Battle of the Taling River", setting up microphones behind the Japanese lines, arranging an elaborate hookup to broadcast the sound of firing to Tokyo, but then had to call off the broadcast when the Chinese retreated without giving combat.

Japanese forces occupied Jinzhou on January 3, 1932, with the local populace waving Japanese flags homemade during the night to appease the conquerors.

== Aftermath ==
On the Chinese side confusion reigned. The old government of Chiang Kai-shek at Nanjing had resigned and a new one under Premier Sun Fo had been formed. Additionally, Marshal Zhang Xueliang's defenders were in disorderly retreat toward the Great Wall, leaving only a small garrison to protect the few government functionaries who remained behind. At Nanjing Eugene Chen, the new Kuomintang Foreign Minister, asserted that his government had never ordered evacuation of Jinzhou, but, on the contrary, had ordered Marshal Zhang repeatedly to stand his ground. Nine Chinese generals in various parts of China denounced Premier Sun Fo's new government, blaming it for the humiliating loss of Jinzhou without a struggle.

The day after the fall of Jinzhou, the Imperial Japanese Army occupied Shanhaiguan, thus completing its military control over south Manchuria.

== See also ==
- Japanese invasion of Manchuria
- Pacification of Manchukuo
