= Tangchi, Heilongjiang =

Tangchi 汤池
- Town
- 汤池镇
- Location within Heilongjiang Location within China
- Coordinates: 46°59′05″N 123°46′12″E
- Country: China
- Province: Heilongjiang
- Prefecture-level city: Qiqihar
- County: Tailai County
- Elevation: 146 m (479 ft)
- Time zone: UTC+8 (China Standard)

Tangchi (Chinese: 汤池; pinyin: Tāngchí) is a town in Tailai County, western Heilongjiang province, Northeast China, about 43 kilometres (27 mi) south-southwest of the prefecture city Qiqihar.

It was the site of a battle in the Jiangqiao Campaign on November 17, 1931, between Ma Zhanshan's 23,000 Chinese and 3,500 Japanese under Lt. General Jiro Tamon during the invasion of Manchuria.
