= Northeastern Loyal and Brave Army =

Following the defeat of the forces of Ding Chao at Harbin in February 1932, Feng Zhanhai withdrew his forces to Shanhetun, a village in the Wuchang District. He then called for volunteers, and the Public Safety Bureaus in the local districts turned over to them their police and militia, and established Feng as the General in command of a force, the Northeastern Loyal and Brave Army, of 15,000 men in the hills with the capital of Jilin City to his south and the metropolis of Harbin to his north. There he was able to wreak havoc on the Japanese rail communications on the Chinese Eastern Railway running through his area of control.

In response the Japanese and Manchukoans launched two campaigns to clear Feng's Army out of the countryside. From June to July 1932 the Feng Zhanhai Subjugation Operation cleared the districts of Shuangcheng, Acheng, Yushu, Wuchang, and Shulan of Feng's Anti-Japanese forces. This forced Feng to retreat to the west. In September 1932 during the Second Feng Zhanhai Subjugation Operation a force of 7,000 Manchukuoans cornered the now 10,000 men Volunteer force "bandits" of Feng retreating from the previous attack. Although surrounded, over half the guerrillas were able to slip through the encirclement and make good their escape to Rehe.

Later Feng's force joined in opposing the invasion of Rehe, and was forced to draw back into the area inside the Great Wall. Subsequently he participated in Feng Yuxiang's Anti Japanese Allied Army, as its Fourth Route Army commander in chief, against Japan and their Manchukuoan allied forces in the Dolonor area of Chahar. Following the dispersal of that force by Chiang Kai-shek, his force was formed into the 91st Division which Feng commanded until July 1938 when the Division suffered heavy casualties during the battle of Wuhan.

== See also ==
- Japanese invasion of Manchuria
- Pacification of Manchukuo
- Second Sino-Japanese War

== Sources ==
- Coogan, Anthony (July 1993). "The volunteer armies of Northeast China". History Today. Vol. 43, no. 7. pp. 36–41. Archived from the original on 2012-10-18 – via Questia.
- Notes On A Guerrilla Campaign, from http://www.democraticunderground.com accessed November 4, 2006
  - a more readable version here and some photos, from http://forum.axishistory.com, accessed November 4, 2006
