= Feng Zhanhai =

Chinese general

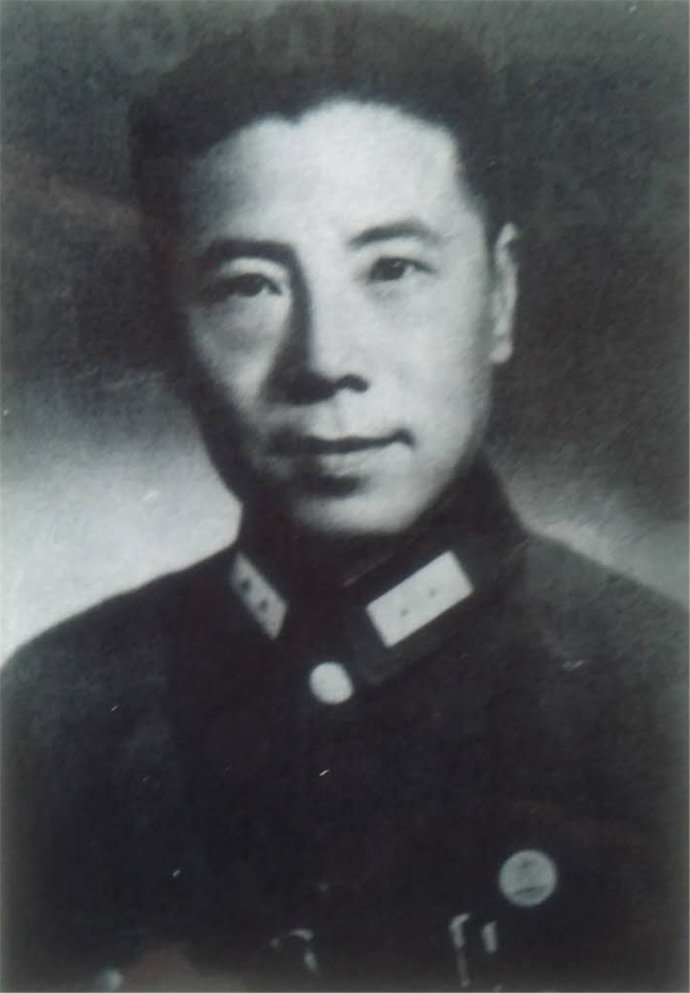
- Native name: 馮占海
- Born: 6 November 1899; Yixiang, Fengtian, Qing China
- Died: 14 September 1963 (aged 63) Changchun, Jilin, People's Republic of China
- Allegiance: Republic of China
- Branch: (Republic of China (1912–1949)) National Revolutionary Army
- Service years: 1917–1939
- Rank: Lieutenant General
- Conflicts: Mukden Incident; Battle of Rehe

Feng Zhanhai (simplified Chinese: 冯占海; traditional Chinese: 馮占海; pinyin: Féng Zhànhǎi; Wade–Giles: Feng Chan-hai; 6 November 1899 – 14 September 1963), was one of the leaders of the volunteer armies resisting the Japanese and the puppet state of Manchukuo in Northeast China.

== Biography ==
Feng was born on 6 November 1899. At eighteen he joined the Dongbei Army, and later entered a military school graduating in 1921. After he graduated, he was successively a platoon leader, company commander, and battalion commander. At the time of the Mukden Incident and Japanese invasion of northeast China he was a colonel commanding a regiment of the Jilin Guards Division.

After the Mukden Incident, he opposed the Northeast border defense headquarters surrender to the Japanese forces, and commanded his troops on September 19 to withdraw from the Jilin provincial capital, and sent his troops during October to oppose the Japanese, fighting near Binxian.

In at the end of January, 1932, Feng joined Ding Chao, Li Du, Xing Zhanqing, Zhao Yi to form the Jilin Self-Defence Army, and was chosen for assistant deputy commander and commanded troops in the defense of Harbin. After Ting's beaten forces retired from Harbin to the northeast down the Sungari River, to join the Lower Sungari garrison of Gen. Li Du.

Feng Zhanhai withdrew his forces to Shanhetun, a village in Wuchang District. He then called for volunteers, and the Public Safety Bureaus in the local districts turned over to them their police and militia, and established Feng as the General in command of a force, the Northeastern Loyal and Brave Army, of 15,000 men in the hills with the capital of Jilin City to his south and the metropolis of Harbin to his north. There he was able to wreak havoc on the Japanese rail communications on the Chinese Eastern Railway running through his area of control.

In response the Japanese and Manchukoans launched two campaigns to clear Feng's force out of the countryside. From June to July 1932 the Japanese operation cleared the districts of Shuangcheng, Acheng, Yushu, Wuchang, and Shulan of Feng's Anti-Japanese forces. This forced Feng to retreat to the west. In September 1932 during the second Japanese operation, a force of 7,000 Manchukuoans cornered the now 10,000 men Volunteer force "bandits" of Feng retreating from the previous attack. Although surrounded, over half the guerrillas were able to slip through the encirclement and make good their escape to Rehe.

Later Feng's force joined in opposing the invasion of Rehe, and was forced to draw back into the area inside the Great Wall. Subsequently he participated in Feng Yuxiang's Chahar People's Anti-Japanese Army, as its Fourth Route Army commander in chief, against Japan and their Manchukuoan allied forces in the Dolonor area of Chahar. Following the dispersal of that force by Chiang Kai-shek, his force was formed into the 91st Division which Feng commanded until July 1938 when the Division suffered heavy casualties during the battle of Wuhan. He later left the army and went to Hong Kong to engage in business. In 1949 he returned to China assuming directorship of the Jilin Provincial Sports Committee. He also served in various government offices. Feng died on 14 September 1963 in Changchun.

== See also ==
- Pacification of Manchukuo

== Sources ==
- Hsu Long-hsuen and Chang Ming-kai, History of The Sino-Japanese War (1937–1945) 2nd Ed., 1971. Translated by Wen Ha-hsiung, Chung Wu Publishing; 33, 140th Lane, Tung-hwa Street, Taipei, Taiwan Republic of China.
- Jowett, Phillip S., Rays of The Rising Sun, Armed Forces of Japan’s Asian Allies 1931-45, Volume I: China & Manchuria, 2004. Helion & Co. Ltd., 26 Willow Rd., Solihull, West Midlands, England.
