= Nen River =

River in Northeast China

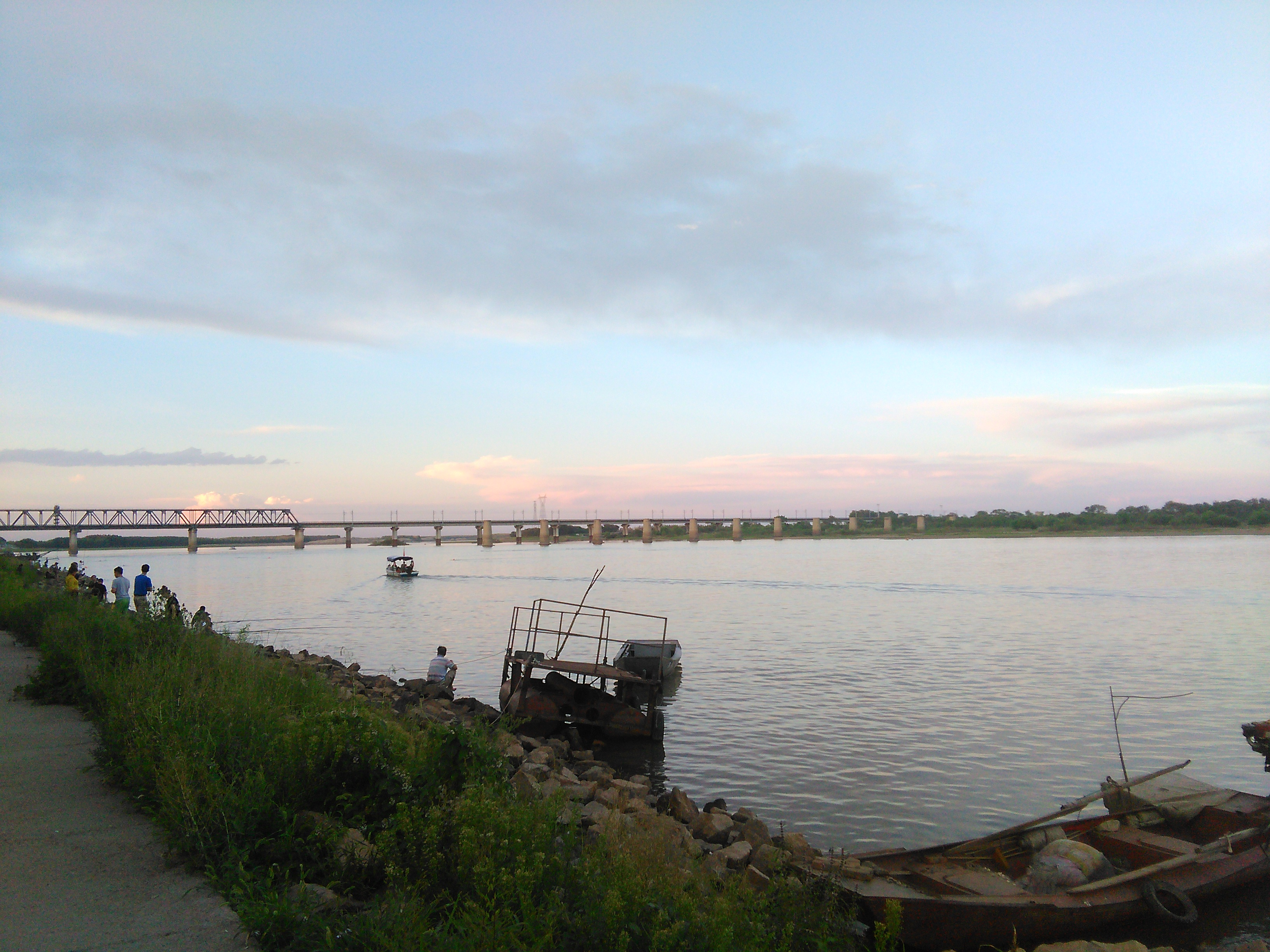
- Scene on the Nen River

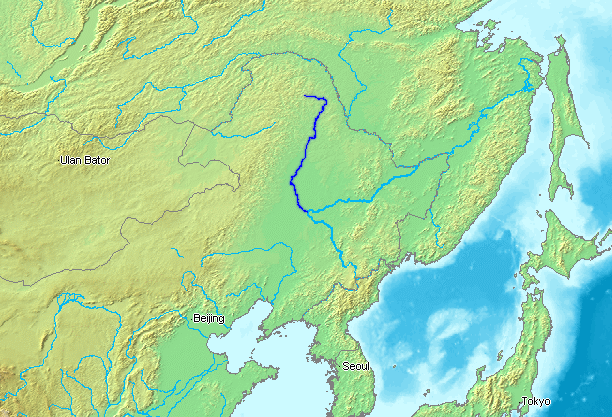
- Native name: ᠨᠣᠨ ᡠᠯᠠ

Location
- Country: China
- Region: Jilin, Heilongjiang, Inner Mongolia

Physical characteristics
- Source: Nen
  - location: Hulunbuir, Inner Mongolia
  - coordinates: 51°20′06″N 124°29′31″E
  - elevation: 657 m (2,156 ft)
- Mouth: Songhua
  - location: near Da'an, Jilin / Heilongjiang border
  - coordinates: 45°26′10″N 124°39′25″E
  - elevation: 121 m (397 ft)
- Length: 1,370 km (850 mi)
- Basin size: 270,000 km^{2} (100,000 mi^{2})

Basin features
- Progression: Songhua → Amur → Sea of Okhotsk
- Tributaries
  - left: Nemor, Wuyuer
  - right: Gan, Nuomin, Yalu, Chuoer, Taoer, Huolin

The Nen River or Nenjiang (Chinese: 嫩江; pinyin: Nèn Jiāng; Wade–Giles: Nen-chiang), or Nonni (Manchu: ᠨᠣᠨ
ᡠᠯᠠ, Möllendorff: non ula, Abkai: non ula) is a river in Northeast China. The Nen River flows through the northern part of Heilongjiang Province and the northeastern section of Inner Mongolia, some parts of the river forming the border between the two regions. At 1,370 km (850 mi) in length, the Nen River is the longest tributary of the Songhua River.

The Nen River flows in the general southern direction in a wide valley between the Greater Khingan and the Lesser Khingan mountain ranges in the west and east, respectively, and meets the Second Songhua River near Da'an to form the Songhua River.

The river is prone to flooding, as occurred most recently in 1998 and 2005.

== Tributaries ==
Major tributaries of the Nen River include:

- Gan River (甘河) (Right)
- Nemor River (讷谟尔河) (Left)
- Nuomin River (诺敏河) (Right)
- Wuyuer (乌裕尔河)/Nuyur River (Left)
- Yalu River (雅鲁河) (Right)
- Chuoer River (Right)
- Taoer/Chaor River (洮儿河) (Right)
- Huolin River (霍林河) (Right)

== Cities ==
- Nenjiang (Mergen), named after the river
- Qiqihar
- Jiangqiao

== History ==
During the Qing Dynasty the Nenjiang provided an important communication route between southern Manchuria and the cities of Qiqihar and Mergen, both of which served at various points as capitals of the Qing Heilongjiang. A portage road connected the upper reaches of the Nenjiang with Aigun on the Amur as well.

In November 1931, the bridge over the Nen River near Jiangqiao became the site of one of the first battles of the Second Sino-Japanese War.
