= Jiangqiao Mongol Ethnic Town =

Jiangqiao Mongol Town 江桥蒙古族镇 (Chinese) ᠵᠢᠶᠠᠩᠴᠢᠶᠣᠤᠮᠣᠩᠭᠣᠯᠦᠨᠳᠦᠰᠦᠲᠡᠨ ᠦᠪᠠᠯᠭᠠᠰᠤ (Mongolian)
- Ethnic town
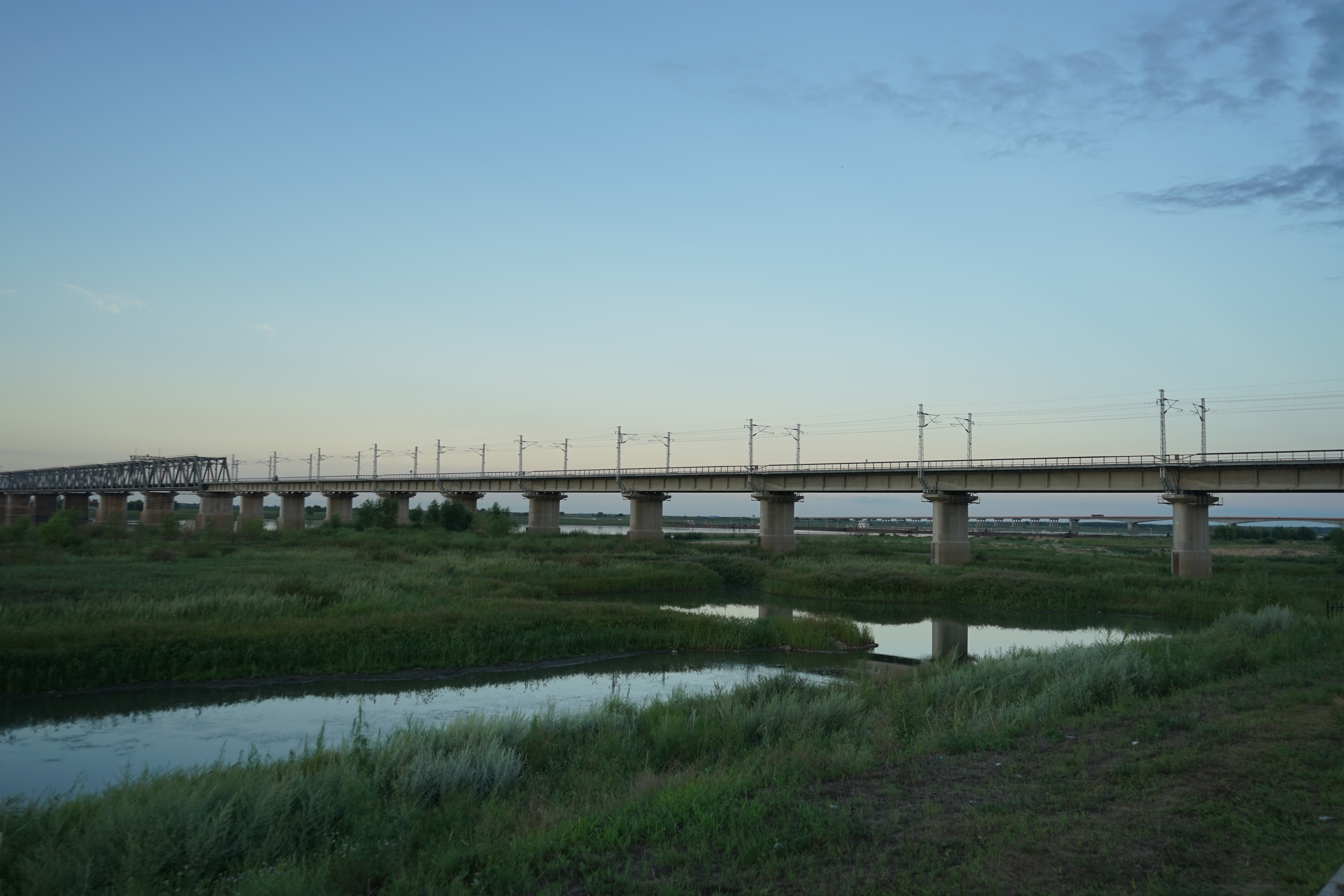

- Location in Heilongjiang Jiangqiao (China)
- Coordinates: 46°46′12″N 123°40′37″E
- Country: People's Republic of China
- Province: Heilongjiang
- Prefecture-level city: Qiqihar
- County: Tailai
- Elevation: 152 m (499 ft)
- Time zone: UTC+8 (China Standard)

Jiangqiao Mongol Town (simplified Chinese: 江桥蒙古族镇; traditional Chinese: 江橋蒙古族鎮; pinyin: Jiāngqiáo Měnggǔzú Zhèn; Wade–Giles: Chiang-ch'iao), Jiangyao (Mongolian: ᠵᠢᠶᠠᠩᠴᠢᠶᠣᠤ; Жиангяо) or Ha-la-erh-ka (Mongolian: ᠬᠠᠯᠠᠡᠷᠬᠺᠠ; Халаэрхка), is a town on the southwestern (left) bank of the Nen River in Tailai County, western Heilongjiang province, People's Republic of China. It is located 67 kilometres (42 mi) south-southwest of downtown Qiqihar and is served by China National Highway 111. As of 2011, it has one residential community (社区) and 6 villages under its administration.

== History ==
The Nenjiang Chinese Eastern Railway railroad bridge across the river was the site of first battles of the Second Sino-Japanese War.

== See also ==
- List of township-level divisions of Heilongjiang
