= Tailai County =

Tailai County 泰来县 T'ai-lai
- County
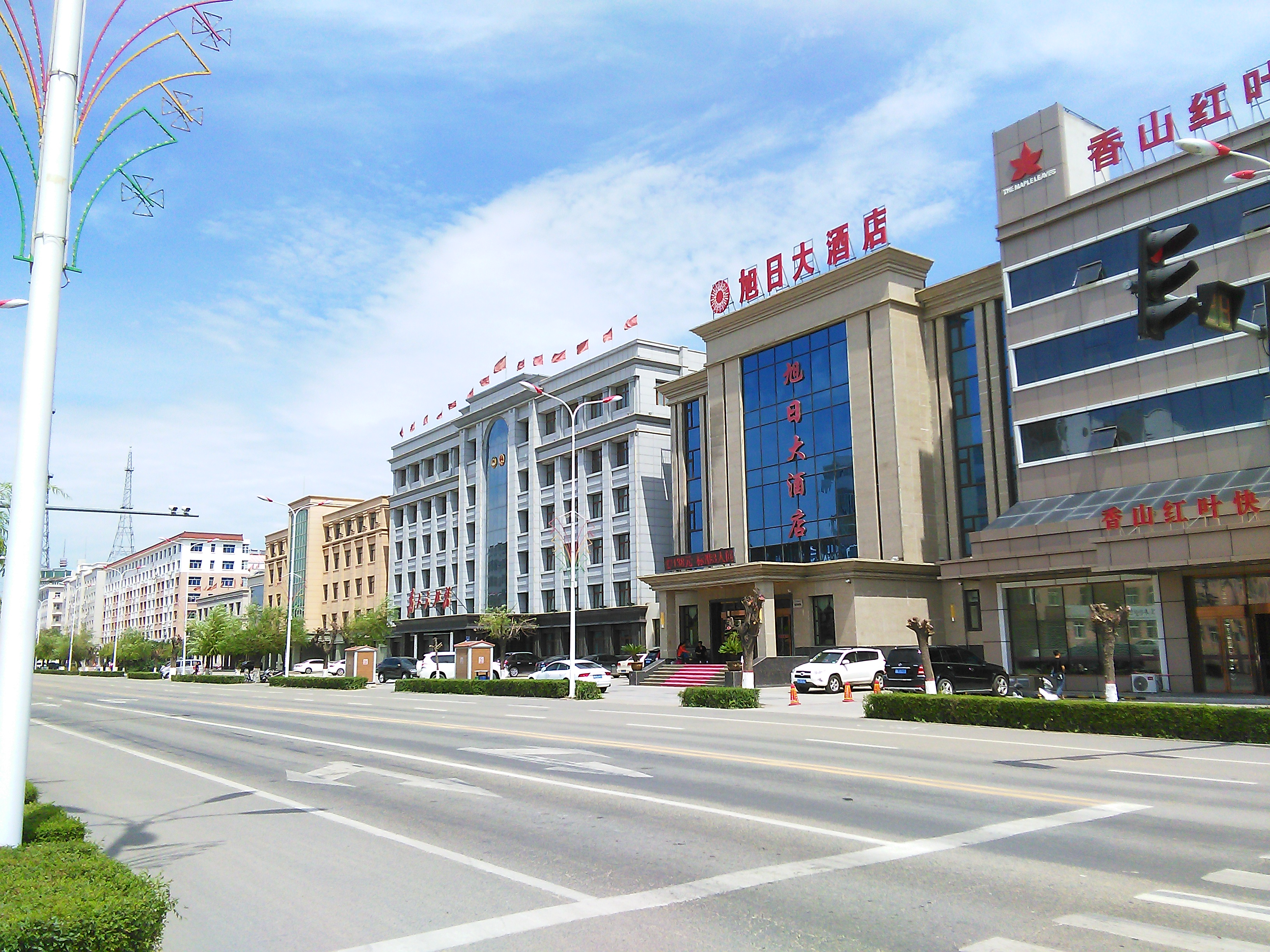

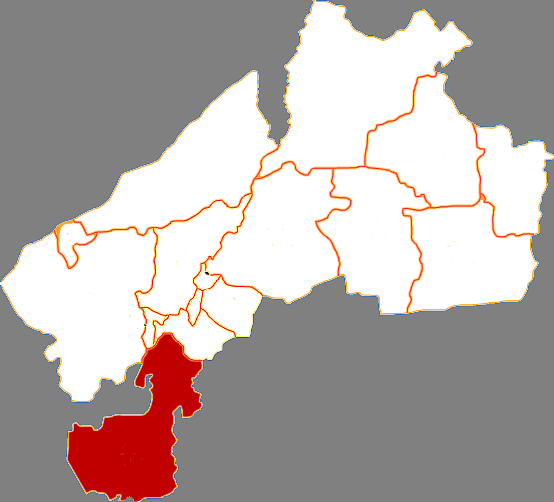
- Tailai in Qiqihar

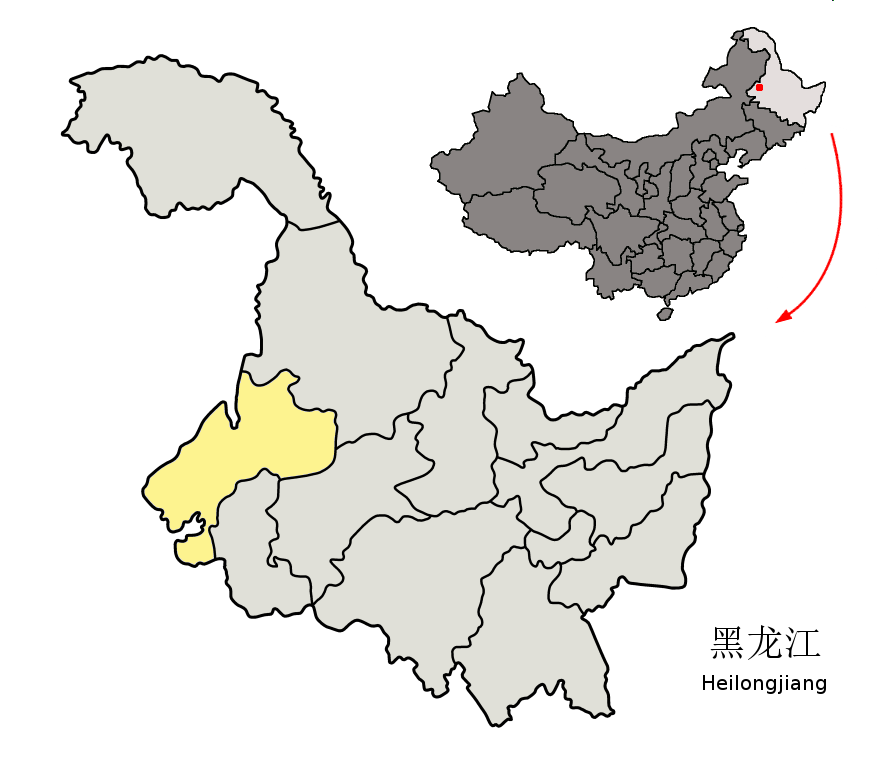
- Qiqihar in Heilongjiang
- Coordinates: 46°23′38″N 123°25′01″E
- Country: People's Republic of China
- Province: Heilongjiang
- Prefecture-level city: Qiqihar

Area
  - Total: 4,061 km^{2} (1,568 sq mi)

Population (2010)
  - Total: 302,027
  - Density: 74.37/km^{2} (192.6/sq mi)
- Time zone: UTC+8 (China Standard)

Tailai County (Chinese: 泰来县; pinyin: Tàilái Xiàn) is a county in the west of Heilongjiang province, People's Republic of China, bordering Inner Mongolia to the west and Jilin province to the south. It is the southernmost county-level division of the prefecture-level city of Qiqihar.

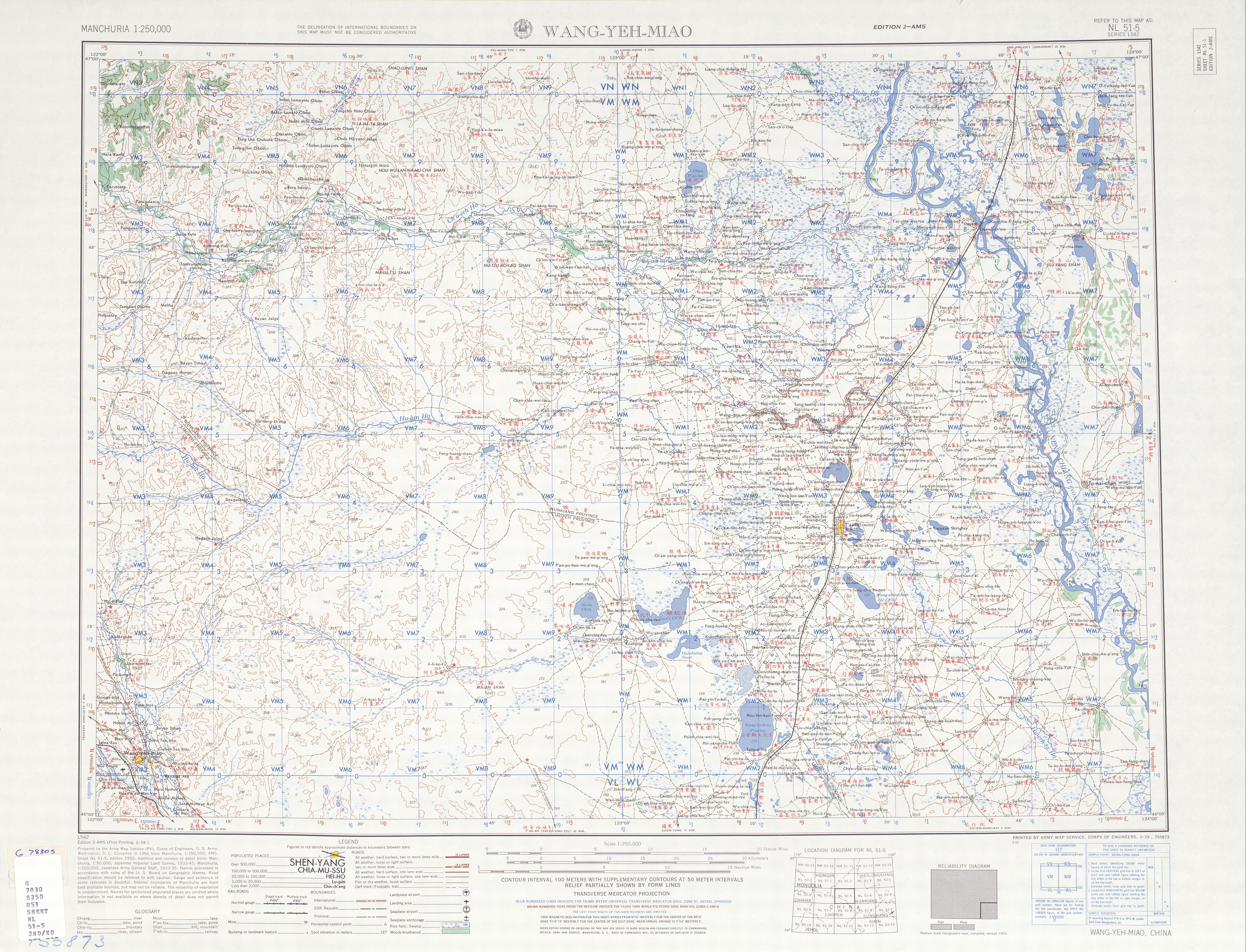
Map including Tailai (labeled as T'ai-lai (walled) 泰來) (AMS, 1956)

== Administrative divisions ==
Tailai County is divided into 7 towns, 1 ethnic town and 2 ethnic townships.

7 towns

- Tailai (泰来镇), Pingyang (平洋镇), Tangchi (汤池镇), Tazicheng (塔子城镇), Daxing (大兴镇), Heping (和平镇), Keli (克利镇)

1 ethnic town

- Jiangqiao Mongol (江桥蒙古族镇)

2 ethnic townships

- Shengli Mongol (胜利蒙古族乡), Ningjiang Mongol (宁姜蒙古族乡)

== Demographics ==
The population of the district was 322,562 in 1999.

== Climate ==
Climate data for Tailai, elevation 139 m (456 ft), (1991–2020 normals, extremes 1981–2010)
Month	Jan	Feb	Mar	Apr	May	Jun	Jul	Aug	Sep	Oct	Nov	Dec	Year
Record high °C (°F)	5.8 (42.4)	11.4 (52.5)	24.7 (76.5)	33.2 (91.8)	38.0 (100.4)	39.9 (103.8)	38.4 (101.1)	36.4 (97.5)	34.5 (94.1)	28.4 (83.1)	18.4 (65.1)	6.9 (44.4)	39.9 (103.8)
Mean daily maximum °C (°F)	−10.3 (13.5)	−4.4 (24.1)	4.3 (39.7)	14.6 (58.3)	22.3 (72.1)	27.3 (81.1)	28.9 (84.0)	27.3 (81.1)	22.0 (71.6)	12.7 (54.9)	0.3 (32.5)	−8.9 (16.0)	11.3 (52.4)
Daily mean °C (°F)	−16.7 (1.9)	−11.3 (11.7)	−2.4 (27.7)	8.0 (46.4)	16.0 (60.8)	21.6 (70.9)	24.0 (75.2)	22.0 (71.6)	15.7 (60.3)	6.4 (43.5)	−5.4 (22.3)	−14.7 (5.5)	5.3 (41.5)
Mean daily minimum °C (°F)	−21.9 (−7.4)	−17.4 (0.7)	−8.7 (16.3)	1.3 (34.3)	9.6 (49.3)	16.1 (61.0)	19.3 (66.7)	17.2 (63.0)	9.9 (49.8)	0.9 (33.6)	−10.2 (13.6)	−19.5 (−3.1)	−0.3 (31.5)
Record low °C (°F)	−36.9 (−34.4)	−35.4 (−31.7)	−26.9 (−16.4)	−9.9 (14.2)	−2.4 (27.7)	2.8 (37.0)	8.9 (48.0)	7.0 (44.6)	−1.3 (29.7)	−15.5 (4.1)	−25.9 (−14.6)	−33.4 (−28.1)	−36.9 (−34.4)
Average precipitation mm (inches)	1.8 (0.07)	2.2 (0.09)	5.3 (0.21)	17.9 (0.70)	31.9 (1.26)	84.4 (3.32)	114.7 (4.52)	86.7 (3.41)	43.0 (1.69)	13.1 (0.52)	3.8 (0.15)	4.2 (0.17)	409 (16.11)
Average precipitation days (≥ 0.1 mm)	2.9	1.9	3.0	4.3	7.7	11.6	12.4	10.3	7.4	4.1	3.2	4.7	73.5
Average snowy days	4.6	3.3	4.1	1.8	0	0	0	0	0	1.1	4.5	6.1	25.5
Average relative humidity (%)	63	54	45	41	46	61	72	72	63	54	57	64	58
Mean monthly sunshine hours	189.6	207.9	253.2	250.8	270.0	264.0	255.4	255.2	247.8	219.0	178.0	165.3	2,756.2
Percentage possible sunshine	67	71	68	61	58	56	54	59	67	66	64	62	63
Source: China Meteorological Administration
