= Jirō Tamon =

Japanese general (1878–1934)

- 多門 二郎
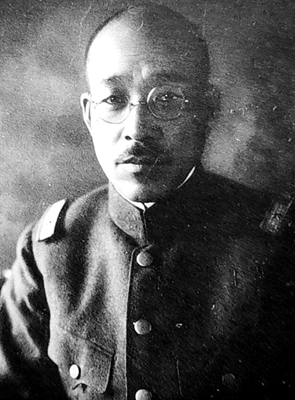
- Born: September 28, 1878; Shizuoka prefecture, Japan
- Died: November 24, 1934 (aged 56)
- Military career
- Allegiance: Empire of Japan
- Branch: Imperial Japanese Army
- Service years: 1905 – 1934
- Rank: Lieutenant General
- Commands: IJA 2nd Division
- Conflicts: Russo-Japanese War; Siberian Intervention; Occupation of northern Sakhalin; Second Sino-Japanese War; Invasion of Manchuria; Jiangqiao Campaign; Jinzhou Operation; Defense of Harbin

Jirō Tamon (多門 二郎, Tamon Jirō; 28 September 1878 – 24 November 1934) was a lieutenant general in the Imperial Japanese Army in the early Second Sino-Japanese War. He was noted as the commander in many of the operations of the invasion of Manchuria.

== Biography ==
The second son of a doctor in Shizuoka prefecture, Tamon graduated from the 11th class of the Imperial Japanese Army Academy in 1898, and served in the Russo-Japanese War as a junior officer with the IJA 4th Infantry Regiment.

After the end of the war, he graduated from the 21st class of the Army Staff College in 1909. He served as an instructor at the Army Academy, on the staff of the IJA 6th Division, and as a battalion commander of the IJA 62nd Infantry Regiment and as an instructor at the Staff College. He also published the field diary which he had kept during the Russo-Japanese War under the title Yo no Sanka Shitaru Nichiro Sen'eki (My Participation in the Russo-Japanese War). The book was aimed at new recruits to provide them with a glimpse of what they might expect in the event that they were called up in a future conflict, and proved to not only be a best-seller, but was also a model for future war diaries.

After spending six months on tour in Europe, Tamon was assigned to the IJA 27th Infantry Regiment based in Vladivostok in 1920 as part of Japan's Siberian Intervention during the Russian Civil War. During the conflict, he was assigned an independent command (the “Tamon Task Force”), which was part of the relief force for Nikolayevsk-on-Amur after the Nikolayevsk Incident. Later, he was attached to the staff of the Sakhalin Expeditionary Force. Tamon commanded the IJA 2nd Infantry Regiment from 1921 to 1922. He was then Chief of Staff of the IJA 4th Division from 1922 to 1924, at which time he was promoted to major general and was given command of IJA 6th Infantry Brigade.

Tamon was Chief of the 4th Bureau of the Imperial Japanese Army General Staff from 1925 to 1927, and then returned to the Army War College, first as Director, then as Commandant in 1929.

From 1930 to 1933, as lieutenant general, Tamon commanded IJA 2nd Division. In 1931, the division came under the control of the Kwantung Army in Manchuria, and took the lead in the initial operations of the invasion of Manchuria, then in the Jiangqiao Campaign, Jinzhou Operation, and in overcoming the defense of Harbin, following the Mukden Incident. During interviews with western press following the successful completion of the campaign, he spoke out against criticism by the League of Nations, stating that European gentlemen were unaware of the need to restore peace and order in Manchuria.

He returned to Japan in January 1933, and in August went into reserves. He died the next year.
