= Alvin Coox =

American military historian and author

- Born: Alvin David Coox; March 8, 1924; Rochester, New York, U.S.
- Died: November 4, 1999 (aged 75); San Diego, California, U.S.
- Education: New York University; Harvard University
- Occupations: Military historian, author

Alvin David Coox, (pronounced "cooks"; March 8, 1924, Rochester, New York – November 4, 1999, San Diego, California) was an American military historian and author known for his award-winning book, Nomonhan: Japan Against Russia.

Coox studied at New York University with a bachelor's degree in accounting and achieved his doctorate in history at Harvard University. He taught at Harvard University in the 1940s and at Johns Hopkins University. It was while at Johns Hopkins that Coox was asked to assist in a study of the Soviet T-34 tank, which led to his commission as a major in the United States Army and deployment to Japan, where he stayed for 13 years. Coox returned to the United States in 1964 to join the faculty at San Diego State University, where he taught until his retirement in 1995.

Coox is primarily known for his two-volume book, Nomonhan: Japan Against Russia, about the nearly forgotten battles in the Nomonhan Incident, where the Soviet Union and Japan fought for control of Mongolia and where Japan was halted in its inland westward conquest from Manchuria. In 1986, he received the Samuel Eliot Morison Prize.

== Scholarship and impact ==
Coox told colleagues that his book on Nomonhan was a result of 35 years of research and more than 400 interviews. Nomonhan was a "nearly forgotten moment in history," wrote John H. Boyle in his review in the Journal of Asian Studies. Coox "reconstructed the Japanese folly at Nomonhan in all of its political, military, and human dimensions to produce a masterful study that will stand as a model of scholarship for military historians." He showed that the Japanese army "did not know and did not want to know about enemy capabilities," and that the Japanese decision makers were so shaken by the defeat that they turned their strategic emphasis away from the Soviet Union in the north to opportunities in the south.

== Selected works ==
- The Unfought War: Japan, 1941-1942, San Diego State University Press 1992
- " Repulsing The Pearl Harbor Revisionists: The State Of Present Literature On The Debacle," In Pearl Harbor Reexamined: Prologue To The Pacific War, edited by Hilary Conroy and Harry Wray. Honolulu : University of Hawaii Press, 1990.
- Nomonhan: Japan Against Russia 1939, 2 vols, Stanford University Press 1988
- "The Pacific War Revisited (Review Article)," Pacific Affairs 56.1 (1983)
- Japan: The Final Agony, Ballantine Books 1970
- The Anatomy Of A Small War: The Soviet-Japanese Struggle For Changkufeng-Khasan, 1938, Greenwood Press 1977
- with Saburo Hayashi, Kōgun, The Japanese Army in the Pacific War, Quantico, US Marine Corps 1959, Greenwood Press 1978
- Tojo, Ballantine Books 1975
