= Chinese People's National Salvation Army =

Chinese guerrilla army

- Simplified Chinese: 中国国民救国军
- Traditional Chinese: 中國國民救國軍
Transcriptions
Standard Mandarin
- Hanyu Pinyin: Zhōngguó Guómín Jiùguójūn

Chinese People's National Salvation Army or NSA (no connection to the church known as The Salvation Army), was one of the most successful volunteer armies in China. It was led by a former bandit turned soldier, Wang Delin.

== History ==
At the time of the invasion, Wang Delin's 200 man battalion was stationed near Yanji, a small town in the east of Jilin province. After Wang's troops fired on a party of Japanese surveyors, and Wang refused to submit to the Manchukuo regime, his defiance attracted other resisters to his side.

Wang established the NSA on February 8, 1932, numbering over 1,000 men. Within a few months this army became one of the most successful of the volunteer armies. Following news of his victories over Japanese and Manchukuoan forces between February and April, troops who had been reluctant members of the new puppet state's forces deserted and joined the NSA boosting its strength from 4,600 on March 1, to above 10,000 men, possibly as many as 15,000 men, organised in five brigades in April. It is estimated that the NSA had 30,000 volunteers by July 1932.

== See also ==
- Pacification of Manchukuo
- Second Sino-Japanese War

== Sources ==
- Coogan, Anthony, "The volunteer armies of Northeast China", History Today; July 1993, Vol. 43 Issue 7, pp. 36–41
- Notes On A Guerrilla Campaign, from Democratic Underground, accessed November 4, 2006
  - a more readable version here and some photos, from Axis History Forum, accessed November 4, 2006
