= Li Du =

Chinese general

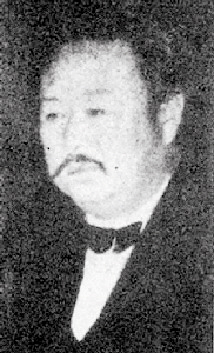
Li Du

Li Du (Chinese: 李杜; pinyin: Lǐ Dù; Wade–Giles: Li^{3} Tu^{4}; 1880–1956) was a leading general in the Jilin Self-Defence Army (JSDA). The JSDA was one of the Anti-Japanese volunteer armies led by general Ma Zhanshan which resisted the Empire of Japan's invasion of northeast China in 1932.

Following the invasion of northeast China by the Empire of Japan, and the Defense of Harbin. Ding Chao's beaten JSDA retired from Harbin and marched to the northeast down the Songhua River, to join the Lower Songhua garrison of General Li Du and together formed the nucleus of armed opposition in the erstwhile Jilin province.
