= Mukden incident =

1931 Japan false flag railway explosion

- Part of the Second Sino-Japanese War and the interwar period
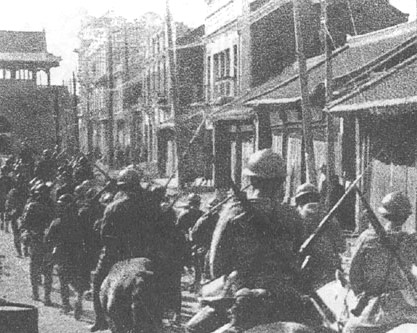
- Japanese troops entering Mukden (now Shenyang) during the incident
Date	September 18, 1931
Location	near Mukden (now Shenyang), Manchuria, Republic of China 41.834610°N 123.465984°E
Result	Japanese victory: Japanese invasion of Manchuria

Belligerents
China	Japan

Commanders and leaders
Zhang Xueliang; Ma Zhanshan; Feng Zhanhai	Shigeru Honjō; Jirō Minami; Kanji Ishiwara; Seishirō Itagaki

Strength
160,000	30,000–66,000

Casualties and losses
Western claim: 340+ killed; Chinese claim: 5 officers and 144 soldiers killed; 14 officers and 172 soldiers wounded; 483 soldiers missing; Japanese claim: 320 killed	Western claim: 25 killed; Japanese claim: 2 killed, 22 wounded

Mukden incident

Chinese name
- Traditional Chinese: 九一八事變
- Simplified Chinese: 九一八事变
Transcriptions
Standard Mandarin
- Hanyu Pinyin: Jiǔyībā Shìbiàn
- Wade–Giles: Chiu^{3}-i^{1}-pa^{1} Shih^{4}-pien^{4}
- IPA: [tɕjòʊ.í.pá ʂî.pjɛ̂n]
Yue: Cantonese
- Yale Romanization: Gáuyātbaat Sihbin
- Jyutping: gau2 jat1 baat3 si6 bin3
- IPA: [kɐw˧˥.jɐt̚˥.pat̚˧ si˨.pin˧]

Alternative name
- Traditional Chinese: 瀋陽事變
- Simplified Chinese: 沈阳事变
Transcriptions

Japanese name
- Kanji: 満州事変
- Kana: まんしゅうじへん
Transcriptions
- Romanization: Manshū Jihen

The Mukden incident was a false flag event staged by Japanese military personnel as a pretext for the 1931 Japanese invasion of Manchuria. On September 18, 1931, Lieutenant Suemori Kawamoto of the Independent Garrison Unit of the 29th Japanese Infantry Regiment detonated a small quantity of dynamite close to a railway line owned by Japan's South Manchuria Railway near Mukden (now Shenyang). The explosion was so weak that it failed to destroy the track, and a train passed over it minutes later. The Imperial Japanese Army accused Chinese dissidents of the act and responded with a full invasion that led to the occupation of Manchuria, in which Japan established its puppet state of Manchukuo five months later.

== Names ==
In English, the Mukden incident is also known as the Manchurian incident. In Japanese, 'Manchurian incident' (Kyūjitai: 滿洲事變, Shinjitai: 満州事変, Manshū-jihen) usually refers to the entire sequence of events (including the invasion), rather than just the initial September 1931 attack on the railway line. In Chinese, the attack on the railway line is known as the Liutiao Lake incident (traditional Chinese: 柳條湖事變; simplified Chinese: 柳条湖事变; pinyin: Liǔtiáohú Shìbiàn) and the "September 18 incident" (九・一八事变; Jiǔyībā Shìbiàn) refers to the entire sequence of events.

== Background ==
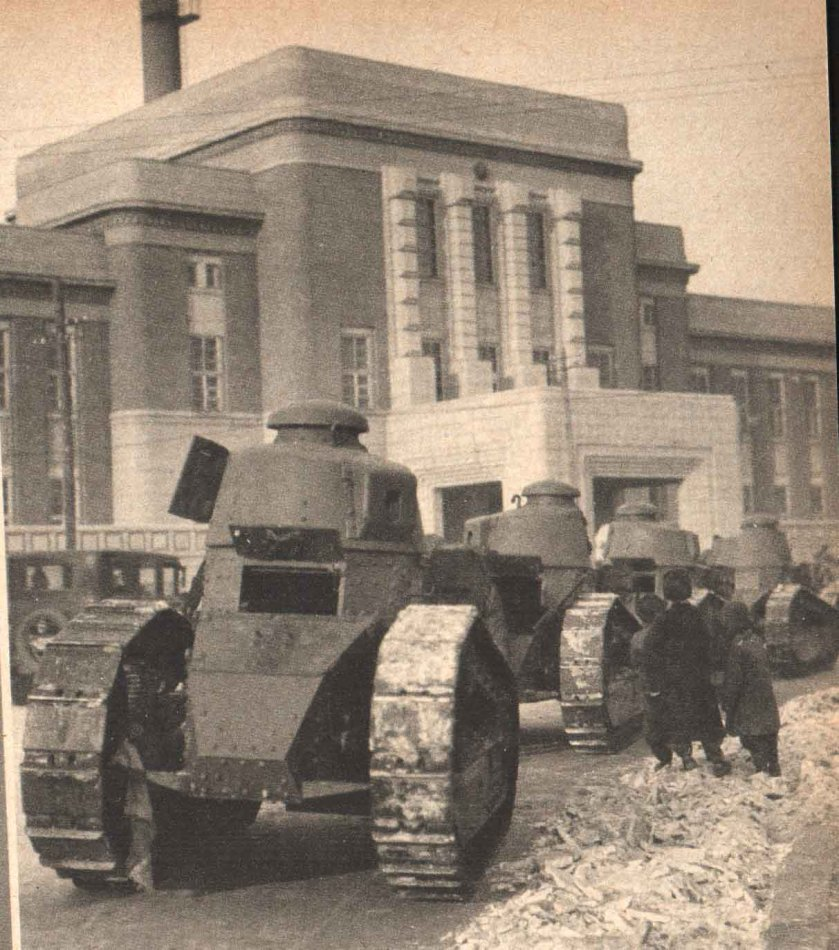
Renault FT 17 tanks captured by the Japanese after the September 18th incident, September 19, 1931

Japanese economic presence and political interest in Manchuria had been growing ever since the end of the Russo-Japanese War (1904–1905). The Treaty of Portsmouth that ended the war had granted Japan the lease of the South Manchuria Railway branch (from Changchun to Lüshun) of the China Far East Railway. The Japanese government, however, claimed that this control included all the rights and privileges that China granted to Russia in the 1896 Li–Lobanov Treaty, as enlarged by the Kwantung Lease Agreement of 1898. This included absolute and exclusive administration within the South Manchuria Railway Zone. Japanese railway guards were stationed within the zone to provide security for the trains and tracks; however, these were regular Japanese soldiers, and they frequently carried out maneuvers outside the railway areas.

On the 91st anniversary of the September 18 incident, the Museum of the Imperial Palace of Manchukuo in Changchun, Jilin Province, and the Museum of the Northeast Anti-Japanese United Army in Harbin, Heilongjiang, released new findings.

Meanwhile, the newly formed Chinese government was attempting to reassert its authority over the country after over a decade of fragmented warlord dominance. They started to claim that treaties between China and Japan were invalid. China also announced new acts, so the Japanese people (including Koreans and Taiwanese as both regions were under Japanese rule at this time) who had settled frontier lands, opened stores or built their own houses in China were expelled without any compensation. Manchurian warlord Zhang Zuolin tried to deprive Japanese concessions too, but he was assassinated by the Japanese Kwantung Army. Zhang Xueliang, Zhang's son and successor, joined the Nanjing Government led by Chiang Kai-shek from anti-Japanese sentiment. Official Japanese objections to the oppression against Japanese nationals within China were rejected by the Chinese authorities.

The 1929 Sino-Soviet conflict (July–November) over the Chinese Eastern Railroad (CER) further increased the tensions in the Northeast that would lead to the Mukden incident. The Soviet Red Army victory over Zhang Xueliang's forces not only reasserted Soviet control over the CER in Manchuria but revealed Chinese military weaknesses that Japanese Kwantung Army officers were quick to note.

The Soviet Red Army performance also stunned Japanese officials. Manchuria was central to Japan's East Asia policy. Both the 1921 and 1927 Imperial Eastern Region Conferences reconfirmed Japan's commitment to be the dominant power in Manchuria. The 1929 Red Army victory shook that policy to the core and reopened the Manchurian problem. By 1930, the Kwantung Army realized they faced a Red Army that was only growing stronger. The time to act was drawing near and Japanese plans to conquer the Northeast were accelerated.

In April 1931, a national leadership conference of China was held between Chiang Kai-shek and Zhang Xueliang in Nanjing. They agreed to put aside their differences and assert China's sovereignty in Manchuria strongly. Some officers of the Kwantung Army began to plot to invade Manchuria secretly. There were other officers who wanted to support plotters in Tokyo.

== Events ==
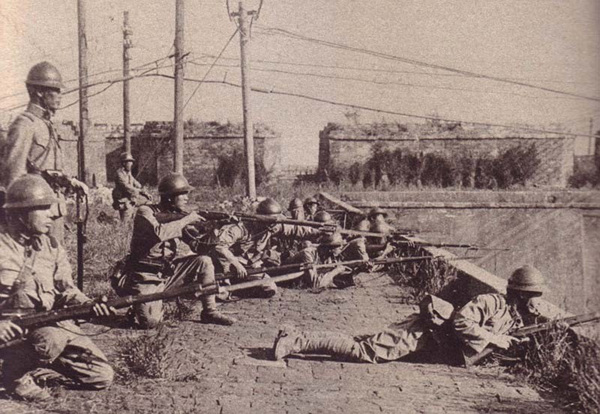
Japanese soldiers of 29th Regiment on the Mukden West Gate

Believing that a conflict in Manchuria would be in the best interest of Japan, Kwantung Army Colonel Seishirō Itagaki and Lieutenant Colonel Kanji Ishiwara independently devised a plan to prompt Japan to invade Manchuria by provoking an incident from Chinese forces stationed nearby. However, after the Japanese Minister of War Jirō Minami dispatched Major General Yoshitsugu Tatekawa to Manchuria for the specific purpose of curbing the insubordination and militarist behavior of the Kwantung Army, Itagaki and Ishiwara believed that they no longer had the luxury of waiting for the Chinese to respond to provocations but had to stage their own.

Itagaki and Ishiwara chose to sabotage the rail section in an area near Liutiao Lake (柳條湖; liǔtiáohú). The area had no official name and was not militarily important, but it was only eight hundred meters away from the Chinese garrison of Beidaying (北大營; běidàyíng), where troops under the command of the "Young Marshal" Zhang Xueliang were stationed. The Japanese plan was to attract Chinese troops by an explosion and then blame them for having caused the disturbance, in order to provide a pretext for a formal Japanese invasion. They planned to make the sabotage appear to be a calculated Chinese attack on an essential target, so that the expected Japanese reaction would appear as a legitimate measure to protect a railway of industrial and economic importance. The Japanese press labeled the site "Liǔtiáo Ditch" (柳條溝; liǔtiáogōu) or "Liǔtiáo Bridge" (柳條橋; liǔtiáoqiáo), when in reality, the site was a small railway section laid on an area of flat land. The choice to place the explosives at this site was to avert the extensive rebuilding that would have been needed had the site actually been a railway bridge.

== Incident ==
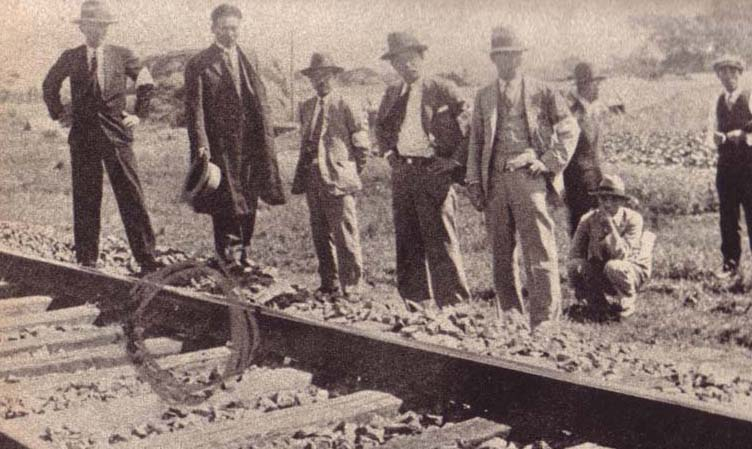
Japanese experts inspect the "sabotaged" South Manchurian Railway.

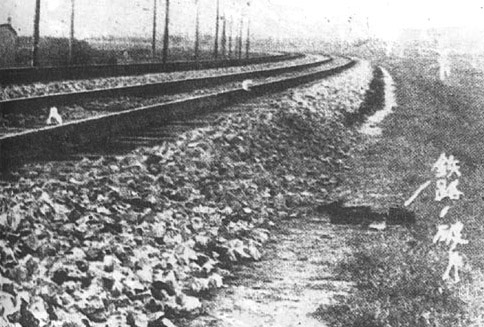
A section of the Liǔtiáo Railway

Colonel Seishirō Itagaki, Lieutenant Colonel Kanji Ishiwara, Colonel Kenji Doihara, and Major Takayoshi Tanaka had completed plans for the incident by May 31, 1931. The plan was executed when 1st Lieutenant Suemori Kawamoto of the Independent Garrison Unit (獨立守備隊) of the 29th Infantry Regiment, which guarded the South Manchuria Railway, placed explosives near the tracks, but far enough away to do no real damage. At around 10:20 p.m. (22:20), September 18, the explosives were detonated. However, the explosion was minor and only a 1.5-meter section on one side of the rail was damaged. In fact, a train from Changchun passed by the site on this damaged track without difficulty and arrived in Shenyang at 10:30 p.m. (22:30).

== Invasion of Manchuria ==
On the morning of September 19, two Japanese artillery pieces installed at the Shenyang officers' club opened fire on the National Revolutionary Army (NRA) garrison nearby, in response to the alleged Chinese attack on the railway. Zhang Xueliang's small air force was destroyed, and his soldiers fled their destroyed Beidaying barracks, as five hundred Japanese troops attacked the Chinese garrison of around seven thousand. The NRA garrison resisted but was defeated and fled. By the evening, the fighting was over, and the Japanese had occupied Mukden at the cost of five hundred Chinese lives and only two Japanese dead.

At Dalian in the Kwantung Leased Territory, Commander-in-Chief of the Kwantung Army General Shigeru Honjō was at first appalled that the invasion plan was enacted without his permission, but he was eventually convinced by Ishiwara to give his approval after the act. Honjō moved the Kwantung Army headquarters to Mukden and ordered General Senjuro Hayashi of the Chosen Army of Japan in Korea to send in reinforcements. At 04:00 on 19 September, Mukden was declared secure.

Zhang Xueliang personally ordered his men not to put up a fight and to store away any weapons when the Japanese invaded. Therefore, the Japanese soldiers proceeded to occupy and garrison the major cities of Changchun and Dandong and their surrounding areas with minimal difficulty.

After seizing radio broadcasting facilities, on 6 October the Kwantung Army began broadcasting propaganda to Japan, aimed towards increasing Japanese public opinion in favor of its actions.

In November, General Ma Zhanshan, the acting governor of Heilongjiang, began resistance with his provincial army, followed in January by Generals Ding Chao and Li Du with their local Jilin provincial forces. Despite this resistance, within five months of the Mukden incident, the Imperial Japanese Army had overrun all major towns and cities in the provinces of Liaoning, Jilin, and Heilongjiang.

== Aftermath ==
Chinese public opinion strongly criticized Zhang Xueliang for his non-resistance to the Japanese invasion. While the Japanese presented a real threat, the Kuomintang directed most of their efforts towards eradication of the Chinese Communist Party (CCP). Many charged that Zhang's Northeastern Army of nearly a quarter million could have withstood the Kwantung Army of only 11,000 men. In addition, his arsenal in Manchuria was considered the most modern in China, and his troops had possession of tanks, around 60 combat aircraft, 4000 machine guns, and four artillery battalions.

Zhang Xueliang's seemingly superior force was undermined by several factors. The first was that the Kwantung Army had a strong reserve force that could be transported by railway from Korea, which was a Japanese colony, directly adjacent to Manchuria. Secondly, more than half of Zhang's troops were stationed south of the Great Wall in Hebei Province, while the troops north of the wall were scattered throughout Manchuria. Therefore, deploying Zhang's troops north of the Great Wall meant that they lacked the concentration needed to fight the Japanese effectively. Most of Zhang's troops were under-trained, poorly led, poorly fed, and had poor morale and questionable loyalty compared to their Japanese counterparts. Japanese secret agents had permeated Zhang's command because of his and his father Zhang Zuolin's past reliance on Japanese military advisers. The Japanese knew the Northeastern Army very well and were able to conduct operations with ease.

The Chinese government was preoccupied with numerous internal problems, including the issue of the newly independent Guangzhou government of Hu Hanmin, CCP insurrections, and 1931 China floods of the Yangtze River that created tens of thousands of refugees. Moreover, Zhang himself was not in Manchuria at the time, but was in a hospital in Beijing to raise money for the flood victims. However, in the Chinese newspapers, Zhang was ridiculed as "General Nonresistance" (Chinese: 不抵抗將軍; pinyin: Bù Dǐkàng Jiāngjūn).

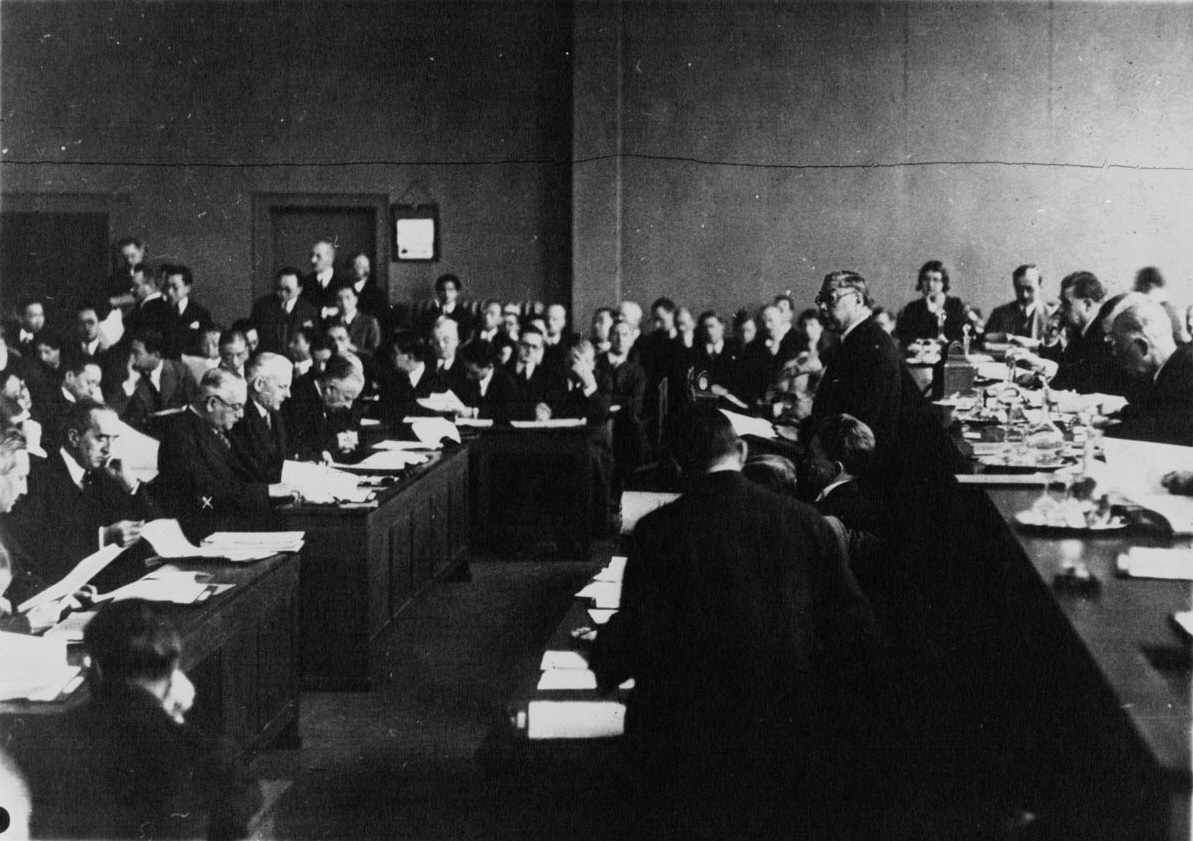
Chinese delegate addresses the League of Nations after the Mukden incident in 1932.

Because of these circumstances, the central government turned to the international community for a peaceful resolution. The Chinese Foreign Ministry issued a strong protest to the Japanese government and called for the immediate stop to Japanese military operations in Manchuria, and appealed to the League of Nations, on September 19. On October 24, the League of Nations passed a resolution mandating the withdrawal of Japanese troops, to be completed by 16 November. However, Japan rejected the League of Nations resolution and insisted on direct negotiations with the Chinese government. Negotiations went on intermittently without much result.

On November 20, a conference in the Chinese government was convened, but the Guangzhou faction of the Kuomintang insisted that Chiang Kai-shek step down to take responsibility for the Manchurian debacle. On December 15, Chiang resigned as the Chairman of the Nationalist government and was replaced as Premier of the Republic of China (head of the Executive Yuan) by Sun Fo, son of Sun Yat-sen. Jinzhou, another city in Liaoning, was lost to the Japanese in early January 1932. As a result, Wang Jingwei replaced Sun Fo as the Premier.

On January 7, 1932, United States Secretary of State Henry Stimson issued his Stimson Doctrine, that the United States would not recognize any government that was established as the result of Japanese actions in Manchuria. On January 14, a League of Nations commission, headed by Victor Bulwer-Lytton, 2nd Earl of Lytton, disembarked at Shanghai to examine the situation. In March, the puppet state of Manchukuo was established, with the former emperor of China, Puyi, installed as head of state.

On October 2, the Lytton Report was published and rejected the Japanese claim that the Manchurian invasion and occupation was an act of self-defense, although it did not assert that the Japanese had perpetrated the initial bombing of the railroad. The report ascertained that Manchukuo was the product of Japanese military aggression in China, while recognizing that Japan had legitimate concerns in Manchuria because of its economic ties there. The League of Nations refused to acknowledge Manchukuo as an independent nation. Japan resigned from the League of Nations in March 1933. It thereafter became more aggressive in China.

Colonel Kenji Doihara used the Mukden incident to continue his campaign of disinformation. Since the Chinese troops at Mukden had put up such poor resistance, he told Manchukuo Emperor Puyi that this was proof that the Chinese remained loyal to him. Japanese intelligence used the incident to continue the campaign to discredit the murdered Zhang Zuolin and his son Zhang Xueliang for "misgovernment" of Manchuria. In fact, drug trafficking and corruption had largely been suppressed under Zhang Zuolin.

== Controversy ==
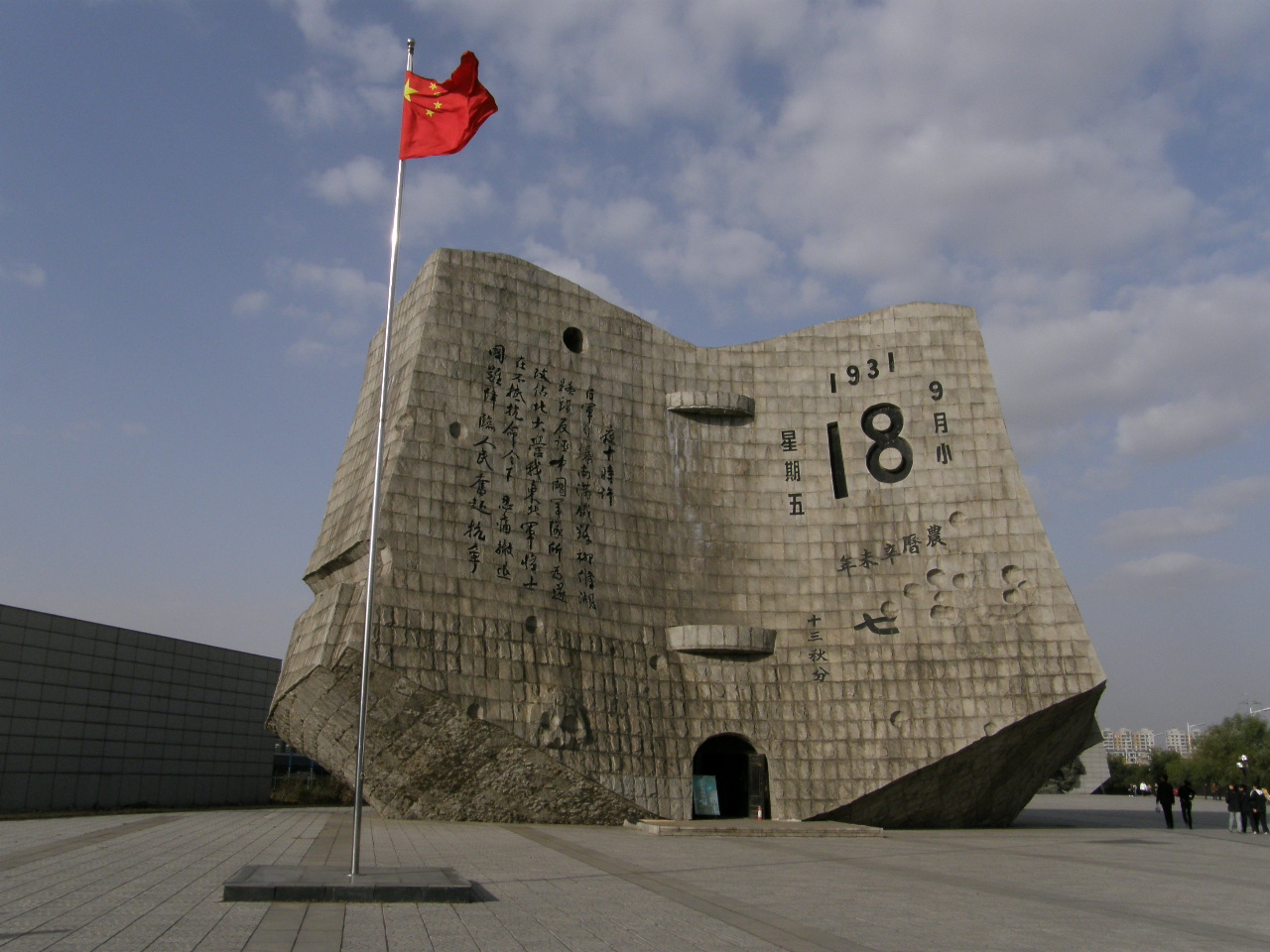
The September 18th History Museum in Shenyang

Different opinions still exist as to who caused the explosion on the Japanese railroad at Mukden. Strong evidence points to young officers of the Japanese Kwantung Army having conspired to cause the blast, with or without direct orders from Tokyo. Post-war investigations confirmed that the original bomb planted by the Japanese failed to explode, and a replacement had to be planted. The resulting explosion enabled the Japanese Kwantung Army to accomplish their goal of triggering a conflict with Chinese troops stationed in Manchuria and the subsequent establishment of the puppet state of Manchukuo.

Sadako Ogata has argued that the invasion was an independent action of the Kwantung Army, emphasizing how officers on the ground had the initiative and even defied various orders from the authorities. However, according to historian James Crowley, the officers on the ground still shared the same overall intentions as the civilian leaders. Both sides saw a lack of resources in a hypothetical war with the Soviet Union or the United States to be a weak point in Japan's ability to have hegemony in East Asia.

The 9.18 Incident Exhibition Museum (九・一八歷史博物館) in Shenyang, opened by the People's Republic of China on September 18, 1991, takes the position that the explosives were planted by Japan. The Yūshūkan museum, located within Yasukuni Shrine in Tokyo, also places the blame on members of the Kwantung Army.

David Bergamini's book Japan's Imperial Conspiracy (1971) has a detailed chronology of events in both Manchuria and Tokyo surrounding the Mukden incident. Bergamini concludes that the greatest deception was that the Mukden incident and Japanese invasion were planned by junior or hot-headed officers, without formal approval by the Japanese government. However, historian James Weland has concluded that senior commanders had tacitly allowed field operatives to proceed on their own initiative, then endorsed the result after a positive outcome was assured.

In August 2006, the Yomiuri Shimbun, Japan's top-selling newspaper, published the results of a year-long research project into the general question of who was responsible for the "Shōwa war". With respect to the Manchurian incident, the newspaper blamed ambitious Japanese militarists, as well as politicians who were impotent to rein them in or prevent their insubordination.

Debate has also focused on how the incident was handled by the League of Nations and the subsequent Lytton Report. A. J. P. Taylor wrote that "In the face of its first serious challenge", the League buckled and capitulated. The Washington Naval Conference (1921) guaranteed a certain degree of Japanese hegemony in East Asia. Any intervention on the part of America would be a breach of the already mentioned agreement. Furthermore, Britain was in crisis, having been recently forced off the gold standard. Although a power in East Asia at the time, Britain was incapable of decisive action. The only response from these powers was "moral condemnation".

== Contemporary CCP historiography ==
In 2017, the Chinese Communist Party (CCP) officially recognized the Mukden incident as the start of its "War of Resistance" against the Empire of Japan as opposed to the 1937 Marco Polo Bridge incident. Historian Emily Matson stated that this shift in the official timeline is part of a domestic "legitimizing narrative" that aims to enhance the CCP's prestige and discredit the Nationalist government's "nonresistance policy" at the time.

== Remembrance ==
Each year at 10:00 a.m. on 18 September, air-raid sirens sound for several minutes in numerous major cities across China. Provinces include Heilongjiang, Jilin, Liaoning, Hainan, and others.

== In popular culture ==
- The Mukden incident is depicted in The Adventures of Tintin comic The Blue Lotus, although the book places the bombing near Shanghai. Here it is performed by Japanese agents and the Japanese exaggerate the incident.
- The Chinese patriotic song Along the Songhua River describes the lives of the people who had lost their homeland in Northeast China after the Mukden incident.
- In Akira Kurosawa's 1946 film No Regrets for Our Youth, the subject of the Mukden incident is debated.
- Junji Kinoshita's play A Japanese Called Otto, opens with the characters discussing the Mukden incident.
- The 2010 Japanese anime Night Raid 1931 is a 13-episode spy/pulp series set in 1931 Shanghai and Manchuria. Episode 7, "Incident", specifically covers the Mukden incident.
- Dutch death metal band Hail of Bullets covers the event in the song "The Mukden Incident" on their 2010 album On Divine Winds, a concept album about the Pacific Ocean theatre of World War II.
- The television drama Kazoku Game (English: Family Game) deals with the history textbook controversy in episode 4, mentioning the Mukden incident.
- The 2024 Chinese drama War of Faith depicts the Mukden incident in episode 24.

== See also ==
- Events preceding World War II in Asia
  - Jinan incident (May 1928)
  - Huanggutun incident (Japanese assassination of the Chinese head of state Generalissimo Zhang Zuolin on 4 June 1928)
  - Northeast Flag Replacement (by Zhang Xueliang on 29 December 1928)
- Second Sino-Japanese War
  - Japanese invasion of Manchuria (1931)
  - January 28 incident (Shanghai, 1932)
  - Defense of the Great Wall (1933)
  - Marco Polo Bridge incident (7 July 1937)
- History of Sino-Japanese relations#Second Sino-Japanese War and World War II
- History of the Republic of China
- Military of the Republic of China
- National Revolutionary Army
