= Ding Chao =

Chinese general

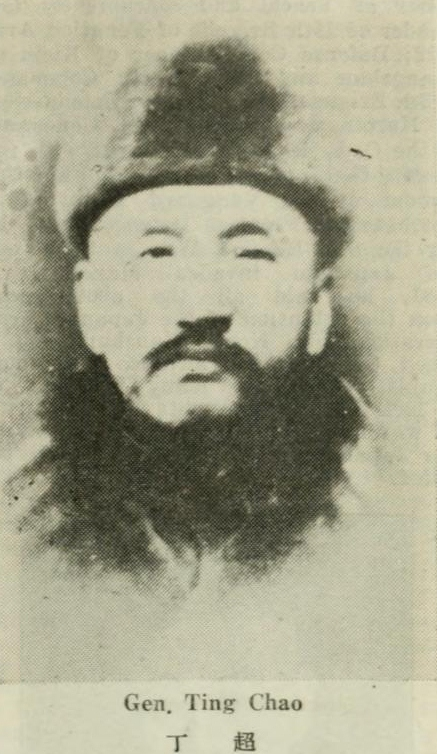
Ding Chao

Ding Chao (Note: Specific spelling may render 'Ding' as 'Ting' and 'Chao' as 'Zhao') (Chinese: 丁超; Wade–Giles: Ting Ch'ao; 1883 – 1950 or 1954) was a military general of the Republic of China, known for his defense of Harbin during the Japanese invasion of Manchuria in 1931 and 1932. He later defected to Manchukuo and served as the governor of Tonghua and Andong.

== Biography ==
Ding Chao's forces commenced mobilization in November 1931 at the request of Ma Zhanshan.

Following the Invasion of Manchuria by the Imperial Japanese Army and the capture of Liaoning and Jilin provinces. Hostilities did not commence in the Harbin area until the end of January 1932 when Ding Chao resolved to defend the northern metropolis, a key hub of rail and riverine communication, against the approach first of General Xi Qia's "New Kirin" Army and then Japanese troops. He appealed to the city's Chinese residents to join his Jilin Self-Defence Army made of railway garrison troops and other regulars in battle against the Japanese. On 29 January, Ding put the Chief Administrator under house arrest and took possession of the office.

Formerly, Ding had been in control of the Railway Guard, with the rank of brigade-general.

Ding was defeated on 5 February 1932 by a force combining Japanese troops and those of General Hai Hsia.

Later after Ding's beaten forces retired from Harbin to the northeast down the Sungari River, they joined the Lower Sungari garrison of Gen. Li Du as the nucleus of armed opposition in the north. After his retreat from Harbin he was made Chairman of the Government of Jilin, from where he opposed the new puppet government of Manchukuo in their anti-bandit operations of the pacification campaign.

In 1933 Ding was captured by the Japanese but was granted amnesty by Puyi. He then served as the governor of Tonghua and later Andong. The rest of Ding's life after the fall of Manchukuo is unclear. Sources claim that he was either arrested by the Soviets and extradited to China in 1950, where he died in the same year at the Fushun War Criminals Management Centre, or that he escaped to Beijing, where he was arrested and executed by the communist authorities in 1954.
