= Interservice rivalry =

Rivalry within a country's armed forces or government agencies

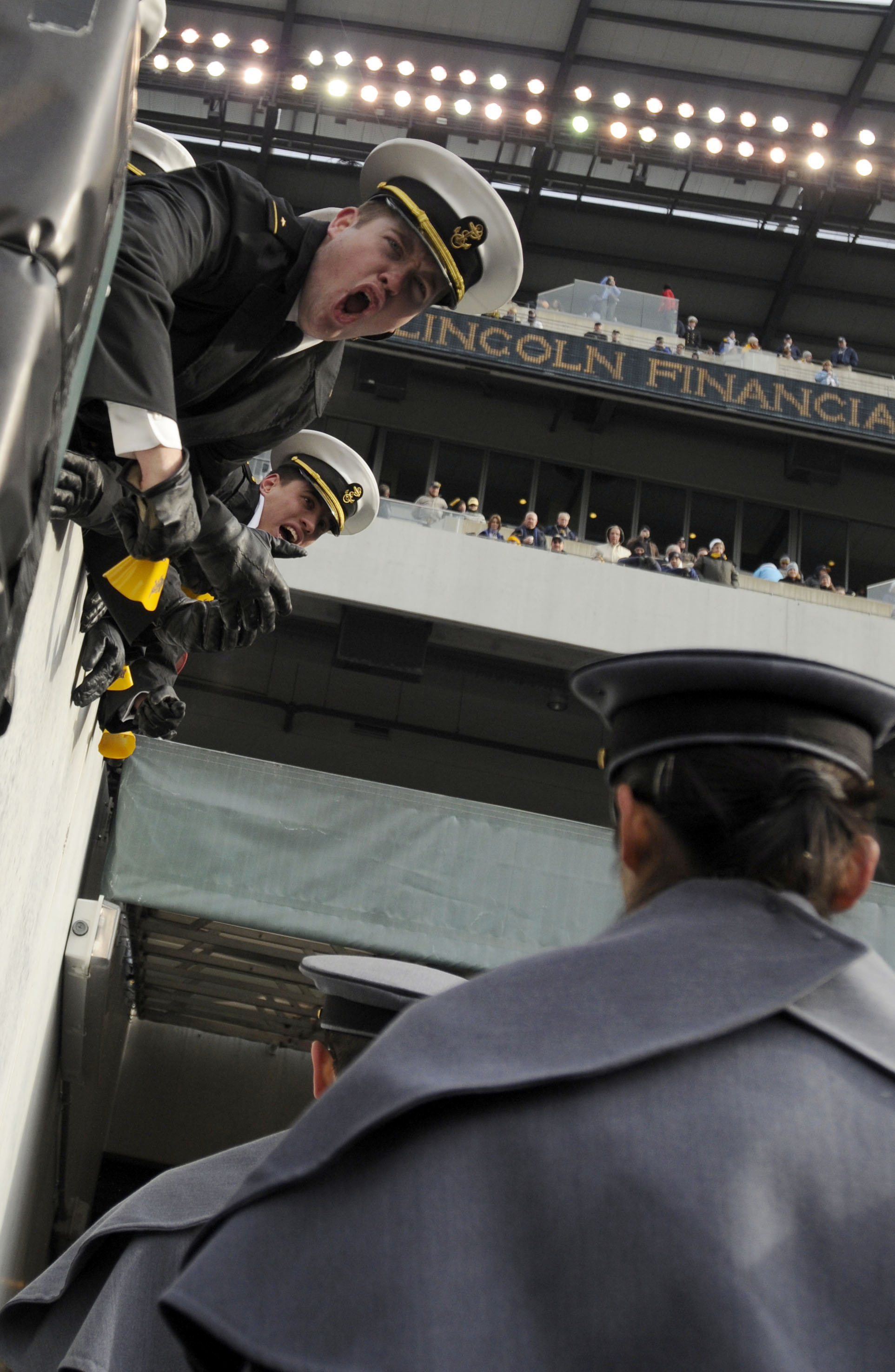
U.S. Naval Academy midshipmen taunting U.S. Military Academy cadets before the 2008 Army–Navy Game

Interservice rivalry is rivalry between different branches of a country's armed forces. This may include competition between land, marine, naval, coastal, air, intelligence, or space forces.

Interservice rivalry can occur over such topics as the appropriation of the military budget, prestige, or the possession of certain types of equipment or units. The latter case can arise, for example, when a navy operates naval aviation units, which can be viewed by the air force as an infringement of its traditional responsibilities.

For the most part, interservice rivalries may only be limited to administrative or internal functions, and the branches may otherwise have warm relations and a willingness to work together when necessary, with the rivalries usually only manifesting as in-jokes and light-hearted stereotypes (such as, in the United States Armed Forces, the stereotype that marines eat crayons) or, in more serious contexts, organisational politics disputes that are usually resolved over time. However, in rare instances, interservice rivalries may be so severe that the branches will outright refuse to cooperate or may even sabotage each other, even during an ongoing war or when lives are at stake (such as the rivalry between the Imperial Japanese Army and Imperial Japanese Navy).

The term also applies to rivalries between a country’s intelligence services and law enforcement agencies (e.g. the FBI and CIA in the United States), the emergency services of a jurisdiction (e.g. the NYPD and FDNY in New York City) or separate services in the same field (e.g. the LAPD and LASD in Los Angeles County, California).

== Cases ==
=== Germany ===
Many military analysts consider the Wehrmacht, Nazi Germany's armed forces, as the pioneers of "jointness" (German: integrierter Kriegführung), pointing out that blitzkrieg, the war-fighting style that brought the Wehrmacht stunning victories between 1939 and 1941, depended upon the close integration of ground and air (and sometimes naval) forces and that even after the blitzkrieg campaigns gave way to a drawn-out war of attrition, the Wehrmacht routinely conducted operations in a way that would today be called "joint". That is, elements of two or more services participated in close cooperation with mutually agreed goals, relatively little interservice rivalry, and a command structure that, at least at the "sharp end" of operations, promoted, rather than inhibited, a spirit of jointness. Consequently, analysts assert, the Wehrmacht enhanced its capabilities and improved its combat effectiveness.

Adolf Hitler understood the value of integrating his land, sea, and air forces and placing them under a unified command, the Oberkommando der Wehrmacht (first under Field Marshal Werner von Blomberg's command; later his own). He also saw the benefit of placing them under operational commanders who possessed at least a rudimentary understanding of the tactics, techniques, needs, capabilities, and limitations of each of the services functioning in their combat zone. Hitler was thus innovative and several years ahead of his peers in the West, Italy, and the Soviet Union. Yet, largely because of Hitler's unusual and autocratic command style and difficulties with delegation, the Wehrmacht lacked elements that today's theorists consider essential to the attainment of truly productive jointness (a single joint commander or Joint Chief of Staff, a proper joint staff, a joint planning process, and an absence of inter-service rivalry) and that, as a result, it often suffered needless difficulties in combat.

=== Iran ===
The rivalries shaped between security organisations in Iran are as follows:

- Persian Cossack Brigade and Gendarmerie (1912–1921)
- Second Bureau of Imperial Iranian Army, SAVAK, and Shahrbani (1957–1979)
- Islamic Revolutionary Guard Corps, Islamic Revolutionary Committees, and Shahrbani (1979–1991)
- Basij and the rest of the Islamic Revolutionary Guard Corps (1979–1981)
- Islamic Revolutionary Guard Corps and Islamic Republic of Iran Army (1979–present)
- Islamic Revolutionary Guard Corps and Ministry of Intelligence (intensified since 2009)

=== India ===
Infighting occurred between the Indian Army and Indian Air Force over the use of attack helicopters came to light during the Kargil War in 1999. This dispute erupted again in 2012 when both the two branches fought over the allocation of AH-64D Apache Longbow helicopters.

=== Japan ===
The long-term discord between the Imperial Japanese Army and Imperial Japanese Navy was one of the most notorious examples of interservice rivalry. The situation, with its origin traced back to the Meiji period, came with both geopolitical and military consequences leading to Japan's involvement in World War II. The IJA/IJN rivalry expressed itself in the early 1930s as the "strike north" (Hokushin-ron) and "strike south" (Nanshin-ron) factions. The goal of both factions was to seize territories which possessed the raw materials, especially petroleum, which Japan needed to sustain its growth and economy, but which it did not possess itself. The strike north faction advocated the taking of the natural resources of Siberia, by way of Manchuria, a scenario in which the prime role would be taken by the Army, while the strike south faction advocated the taking of the oil-rich Dutch East Indies, a scenario in which the Navy would predominate.

In order to further their own faction, relatively junior officers resorted to the assassinations of members of the rival faction and their supporters in government. With both factions being opposed to the peace faction, this period has become known as the era of "government by assassination". Insubordination by the Kwantung Army led first to the occupation of Manchuria, and later the Second Sino-Japanese War following the Marco Polo Bridge incident. However, at the Battles of Khalkhin Gol, any farther expansion northwards into Siberia was shown to be impossible given the Soviet superiority in numbers and armour.

With the loss of Army prestige that followed the failure of the Soviet–Japanese border conflicts, the Navy faction gained the ascendency, supported by a number of the powerful industrial zaibatsu, that were convinced that their interests would be best served fulfilling the needs of the Navy, thus paving the way to the Pacific War.

The rivalry between the IJA and IJN also saw both services developing separate air arms; the Army developed its own amphibious infantry units, transport submarines, and landing craft carriers, and even their own aircraft carriers, while the Navy created its own infantry and marine paratroopers.

Significant examples of this rivalry include the Navy taking several weeks to inform the Army of the disastrous results of the Battle of Midway, and dysfunction between the IJA and IJN during the Guadalcanal campaign.

=== Pakistan ===
The Pakistani Armed Forces used to fight over a number of issues. One in particular was predominantly between the Navy and the Army over budget distribution. A key point of friction was the induction of the cruiser PNS Babur. This was resolved when Pakistani think tanks realised the need for interservice harmony and established the Joint Services Headquarters, which reduces friction between the services. The PNS Zulfiqar (K265), a River-class frigate, was damaged beyond repair after a Pakistani F-86 mistook it for an Indian ship due an interservice conflict between the Pakistan Navy and Pakistan Air Force.

=== United States ===
The U.S. Department of Defense was originally created to provide overall coordination for the various branches of the U.S. Armed Forces, whose infighting, particularly between the Army and Navy, was seen as detrimental to military effectiveness during World War II.

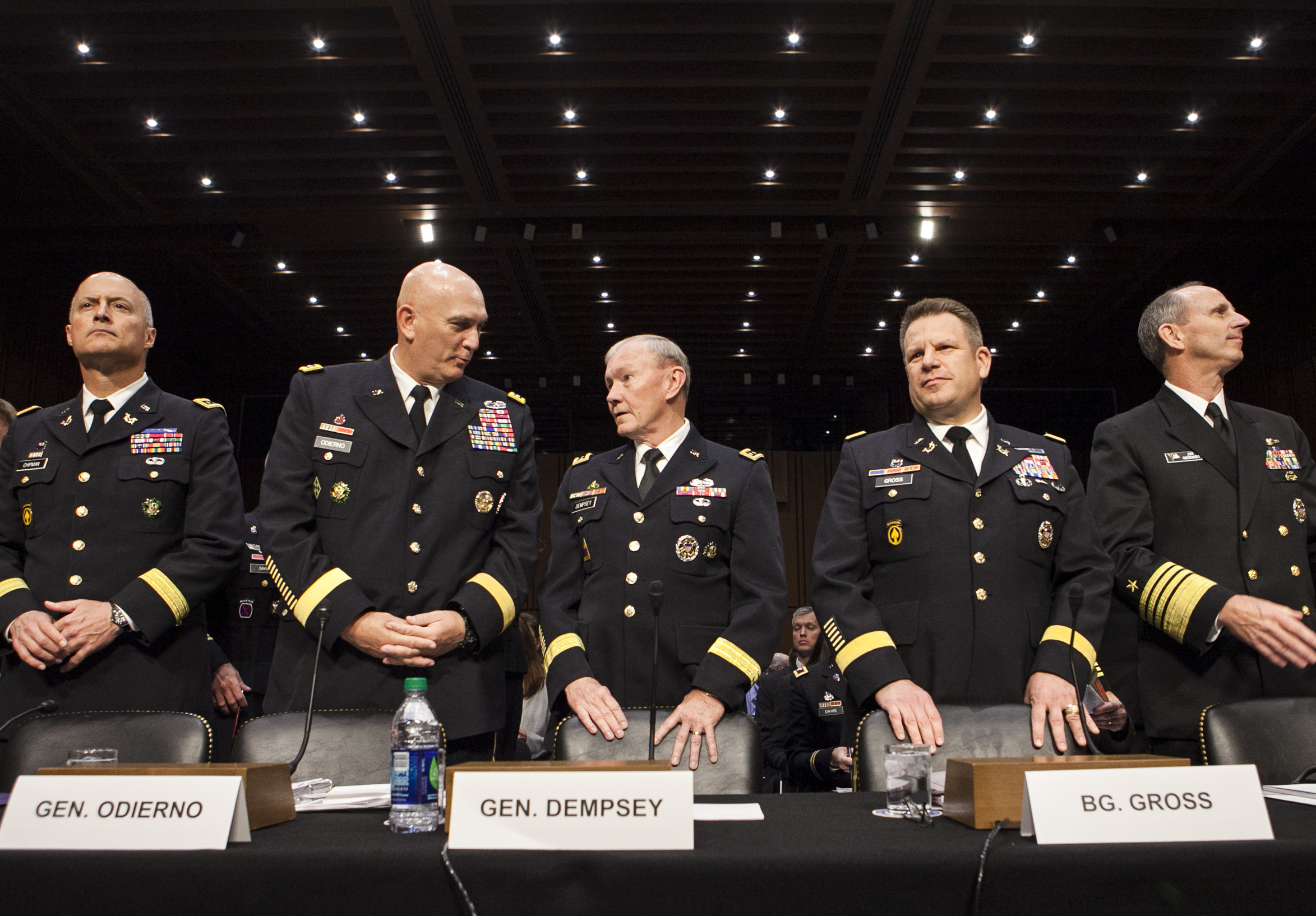
The Chairman of the Joint Chiefs of Staff position, the highest-ranking position within the U.S. Armed Forces, and several important command positions, such as unified combatant commands, have been mostly dominated by U.S. Army generals.

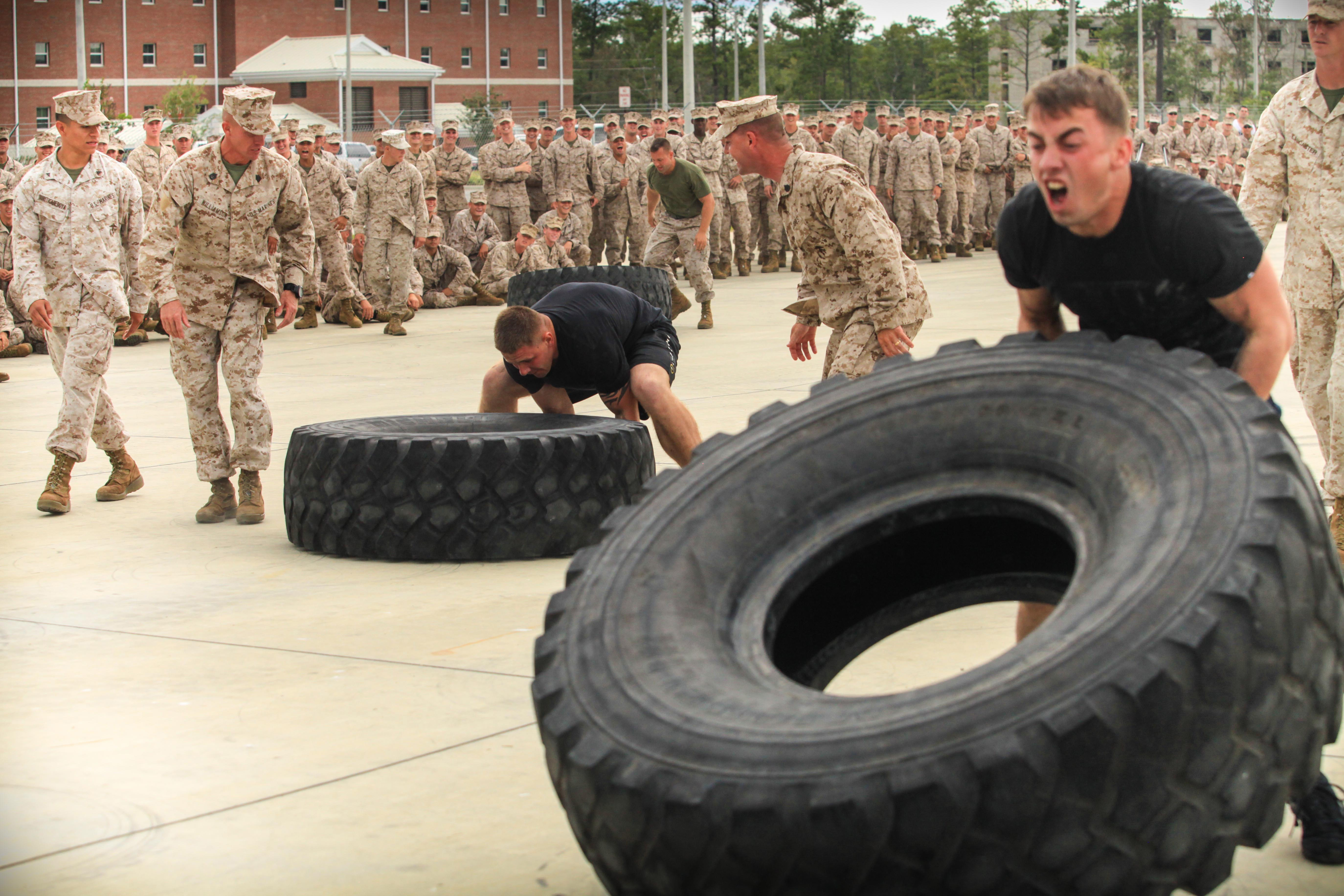
Marines and sailors competing in a strongman competition

The rivalries are also based on services' individual philosophies for rules and behavior. An author wrote in 2012 about the differing cultures of the US Air Force's pilots and the US Navy's aviators:

There was some truth in the old saying that the Air Force had a book for all the things you were allowed to do in the air, and anything not specifically written down was prohibited; whereas the Navy's rule book contained all the things you were not allowed to do, and anything not written down was perfectly legal.

Various mechanisms are used to manage or curb interservice rivalry. In the U.S. Armed Forces, for example, an officer must complete at least one joint tour in another service to reach the level of flag or general officer. Such officers may be described as being "purple", a reference to the combination of the symbolic colors of each branch: red (Marines), green (Army), and blue (Air Force, Navy, Coast Guard).

One well-known encounter, the Revolt of the Admirals, took place after the end of World War II. The newly-created U.S. Air Force sought to create a doctrine which relied heavily on strategic long-range bombing and the Army a large number of reservist troops. Both the Air Force and the Army claimed that the future of warfare depended on the issue of nuclear deterrence, and as such the use of naval gunfire support, as well as the amphibious assault doctrine of the U.S. Marine Corps, was outdated and would never be used again. Secretary of Defense Louis A. Johnson proceeded to strip the Navy of funds on its first supercarrier, the United States. This cancellation caused multiple high ranking Navy personnel to resign. The aftermath backfired against the Navy, and caused Congress to review, and after investigation enabled the implementation of the creation of a Strategic Air Force supporting a nuclear mission.

Previously, during the presidencies of Harry S. Truman and Dwight D. Eisenhower, the Chairman of the Joint Chiefs of Staff position rotated between different service branches. However, in 1962, when President John F. Kennedy appointed General Maxwell Taylor to replace the incumbent, General Lyman Lemnitzer who had been the Chairman since 1960, the rotation between the Air Force, Navy, Marines, and Army was broken as both Taylor and Lemnitzer served in the Army. When General Earle Wheeler was appointed as Joint Chiefs of Staff Chairman by President Lyndon Johnson in 1964, it resulted in Army generals holding the Chairman position for three consecutive terms, from 1960 to 1970. Army generals again served as Joint Chiefs of Staff Chairman for three consecutive terms from 1989 to 2001, when President George H. W. Bush appointed Army general Colin Powell as Chairman in 1989, and when Powell retired in 1993 he was replaced by another Army general, John Shalikashvili, who was appointed by President Bill Clinton, and when Shalikashvili retired in 1997 he was again replaced by an Army general, Hugh Shelton, until finally, when Shelton retired in 2001, he was replaced by non-army officer, Air Force general Richard B. Myers, who succeeded Shelton as Chairman in October 2001.

In December 2018, with the incumbent Chairman of the Joint Chiefs of Staff General Joseph Dunford scheduled to retire the following year, Secretary of Defense James Mattis recommended to President Donald Trump that he pick incumbent Air Force Chief of Staff General David L. Goldfein to be Dunford's successor. Dunford agreed with this recommendation, especially since no Air Force Generals had been Chairman since General Myers retired in 2005. However due to Trump's recent conflict with Dunford and Mattis, instead of taking their recommendation, Trump selected Army Chief of Staff General Mark Milley to be Dunford's successor. The nomination sparked controversy due to previous Joint Chiefs of Staff Chairman before Dunford. General Martin Dempsey was from the Army and if Goldfein had been selected, he would have been the Air Force's first chairman since 2005. Many believed that Trump picked Milley due to a close and personal friendship between the two since early in Trump's presidency. By the time Milley assumed the position in October 2019, exactly half of the Joint Chiefs of Staff Chairman—10 out of 20—had been filled by Army generals.

The United States unified combatant command was also dominated by Army officers. One combatant command, Indo-Pacific Command (previously known as Pacific Command), was historically led by Navy officers and has never been led by officers from any other branch. There was an attempt to place other than Navy officers to lead the Indo-Pacific Command, but the attempt eventually failed. Air Force officers rarely get the position as combatant command commanders and other important specific commands.

=== Special forces ===
Interservice rivalries are often played out at divisional or regimental level or between special forces that are part of different services. The rivalry between special-forces units led to the creation of United Kingdom Special Forces in the United Kingdom, and SOCOM in the United States, to put them all under a unified command, putting an end to the "rice-bowl" doctrine which created absurd situations in Iran, Grenada, and Panama in the 1980s. In the UK, it has put an end to members of the Special Boat Service being recruited solely from the Royal Marines, and it is now a tri-service branch.

Special forces can also have rivalries with regular military units. For example, British special forces have rivalries with regular infantry units due to the latter being taught close-quarters combat, which the former was historically responsible for; this rivalry also relates to budgets, as infantry units requiring CQC training also require costly equipment and training facilities, thus using up money that could otherwise be spent on special forces or other purposes.

== See also ==
- Essence of Decision
- Goldwater–Nichols Act
- Joint warfare
- National Security Act of 1947
- Revolt of the Admirals
