= Rehe (disambiguation) =

Rehe is primarily the atonal pinyin romanization of 熱河 (lit. "Hot Creek"), the former Chinese name of Chengde in northeastern China.

It may also refer to:

- Jehol Province, former province of the Qing Empire, Republic of China, Manchukuo, and People's Republic of China now divided among other provinces in northeastern China
- Rehe Creek or Rehe River, the 700-meter (2,300 ft)-long stream that gave its name to the city and province
- Rehe Diary, another name for the Jehol Diary, an expansive Korean travelogue on northeastern China in the 1780s
- Battle of Rehe in the run-up to the Second Sino-Japanese War (WWII)
- Rehe Guard Army, an army of the Japanese puppet state of Manchukuo during WWII
- Rehe, Germany, community in Rhineland-Palatinate, Germany
- Stephanie Rehe (b. 1969), American professional tennis player

== See also ==
- Jehol Biota, lifeforms particular to the Rehe area
