= Hokushin-ron =

Empire of Japan pre-WWII political doctrine

Map of Japanese Hokushin-ron plans for a potential attack on the Soviet Union. Dates indicate the year that Japan gained control of the territory.

Hokushin-ron (北進論; "Northern Expansion Doctrine" or "Northern Road") was a political doctrine of the Empire of Japan before World War II that stated that Manchuria and Siberia were Japan's sphere of interest and that the potential value to Japan for economic and territorial expansion in those areas was greater than elsewhere. Its supporters were sometimes called the Strike North Group.

It enjoyed wide support within the Imperial Japanese Army during the interwar period but was abandoned in 1939 after military defeat on the Mongolian front at the Battles of Khalkhin Gol (known in Japan as the Nomonhan incident) and the signing of Soviet–Japanese Neutrality Pact in 1941.

It was superseded by the diametrically-opposite rival policy, Nanshin-ron (南進論; "Southern Expansion Doctrine" or "Southern Road"), which regarded Southeast Asia and the Pacific Islands as Japan's political and economic sphere of influence and aimed to acquire the resources of European colonies and to neutralize the threat of Western military forces in the Pacific.

== Origins ==
From the 1890s First Sino-Japanese War, Hokushin-ron came to dominate Japanese foreign policy. It guided both the Japanese invasion of Taiwan (1895) and the Japan–Korea Treaty of 1910, which annexed Korea to Japan. After the Russo-Japanese War (1904-1905) Field Marshal Prince Yamagata Aritomo, a political and military ideological architect of Hokushin-ron, traced the lines of a defensive strategy against Russia. A February 1907 Imperial National Defence guideline envisioned two strategies: Nanshu Hokushin Ron (南守北進, defence in the South and advance in the North) and Hokushu Nanshin Ron (北守南進, defence in the North and advance in the South).

There was intense discourse within Japan on the two diverging theories. After World War I, Japanese troops were deployed as part of the Siberian Intervention during the Allied intervention in the Russian Civil War, with the hope that Japan could be freed from any future Soviet Russian threat by detaching Siberia and forming an independent buffer state. The Japanese troops remained until 1922, which encouraged discussion by Japanese strategic planners of the idea of permanent Japanese occupation of Siberia east of Lake Baikal.

== Invasion of Manchuria ==
An essential step in the Hokushin-ron proposal was for Japan to seize control of Manchuria to obtain an extensive de facto land border with the Soviet Union. Insubordination by rogue Japanese military personnel in the Kwantung Army in 1931 led to the Mukden Incident and provided a pretext for the Japanese invasion of Manchuria. As the Kwantung Army had 12,000 men available for the invasion of Manchuria, it needed reinforcements. War Minister Sadao Araki was a solid supporter of the Hokushin-ron and of a proposed attack on the Soviet Far East and Siberia. He arranged for Chōsen Army forces to be moved from Japanese Korea north into Manchuria without permission from Tokyo in support of the Kwantung Army. The plot to seize Manchuria proceeded as planned, and when presented by the fait accompli, all that Prime Minister Reijirō Wakatsuki could do was weakly protest and resign along with his cabinet. When the new cabinet was formed, Araki, as War Minister, was the real power in Japan. A puppet state was formed in Northeast China and Inner Mongolia, named Manchukuo, and was governed under a form of constitutional monarchy.

== Factionalism within the military ==
Hokushin-ron was largely supported by the Imperial Japanese Army. General Kenkichi Ueda was a strong believer in the Hokushin-ron policy since he believed that Japan's main enemy was communism and that Japan's destiny lay in conquest of the natural resources of the sparely-populated Northern Asian mainland. General Yukio Kasahara was also a major proponent of the Hokushin-ron philosophy and felt strongly that the Soviet Union posed both a major threat and a major opportunity for Japan.

However, rival cliques of officers in the Army claimed to represent the "true will" of the Emperor. The radical ultranationalist Imperial Way Faction (Kōdōha) had many young activists who were strongly supportive of the Hokushin-ron strategy and a preemptive strike against the Soviet Union. Ideological in nature, they saw communism, as embodied by the Soviet Union as a greater threat to their spiritual values and the Emperor's divinity. They were opposed by the more moderate conservative Control Faction (Tōseiha), which favored a more cautious defence expansion and sought to impose greater discipline over the Army and war with China as a strategic imperative. The latter also viewed the Western naval powers in the Pacific, most notably the United States and Great Britain as a greater threat to their ambitions in Asia.

Relations between the Japanese Army and Navy were never cordial and were often marked by deep hostility, a situation whose origin can be traced back to the Meiji period. From the early 1930s, the Army saw the Soviet Union as Japan's greatest threat and for the most part supported the Hokushin-ron concept that Japan's strategic interests were on the Asian continent. The Navy looked across the Pacific Ocean and saw the United States as the greatest threat and, for the most part, supported the Nanshin-ron concept that Japan's strategic interests were in Southeast Asia and the Pacific islands. By the mid-1930s, there was the serious possibility of a clash between the Army and the Navy because of their incompatible expansionist ideas.

== Events of 1936 ==
The Kōdōha faction, which favoured Hokushin-ron, was dominant in the Army during Araki's tenure as Minister of War from 1931 to 1934 and occupied most significant staff positions. However, many of its members were replaced by Tōseiha officers following Araki's resignation from ill health in 1934. In 1936, Kōdōha-affiliated young Army officers launched an unsuccessful coup d'état in the February 26 Incident. As a result, Kōdōha generals were purged from the Army, including Araki, who was forced to retire in March 1936.

The Imperial Defence Plan, formulated in June 1936, incorporated a balance of both Hokushin-ron and Nanshin-ron by requiring both the Army and the Navy to take a peaceful and unprovocative approach to their "enemies". The plan's goal was to acquire territories that possessed the raw materials, particularly petroleum, which Japan needed to sustain its growth and economy but it did not possess itself. Northward expansion (Hokushin-ron) would gain the natural resources of Siberia by attacking the Soviet Union via Manchuria. Southward expansion (Nanshin-ron) would involve seizing the Dutch East Indies (now Indonesia) and other colonies from the French and/or the British. Japan's supply of resources would eventually be assured by creating a "Greater East Asia Co-Prosperity Sphere". However, European powers had been dominant in Southeast Asia for more than a century, and Japanese foreign policy had little experience there. In pursuing Nanshin-ron Japan would risk and, in some quarters even welcome, a large-scale war with the great powers from across the globe.

In November 1936, the Anti-Comintern Pact was concluded between Japan and Nazi Germany. It agreed that in case of an attack by the Soviet Union against Germany or Japan, both countries agreed to consult on what measures to take "to safeguard their common interests." They also agreed that neither would make any political treaties with the Soviet Union, and Germany also agreed to recognize Manchukuo.

== Soviet–Japanese border conflicts ==
A series of Soviet–Japanese border conflicts, without any formal declaration of war, began in 1932. Aggressive actions initiated by Japanese staff and field officers on the Soviet border with Manchukuo and Mongolia led to the disastrous Battles of Khalkhin Gol (1939), which resulted in heavy casualties for Kwantung Army and severely challenged its much-vaunted reputation. Any farther expansion northwards into Siberia was shown to be impossible because of the Soviets' superiority in numbers and armour. However, General Ueda continued to support the actions of his officers, refused to discourage them from taking similar actions, and remained adamant in his support of the Hokushin-ron policy. He was recalled back to Japan in late 1939 and forced into retirement. The Kwantung Army was purged of both its more insubordinate elements and its proponents of Hokushin-ron.

== Abandonment ==
The Army lost prestige because of its failures in the Soviet–Japanese border conflicts; as a result, the Navy gained the ascendency. It was supported in that by a number of the powerful industrial zaibatsu, which were convinced that they could best serve their interests by fulfilling the Navy's needs. The military setbacks on the Mongolian front, the ongoing Second Sino-Japanese War, and negative Western attitudes towards Japanese expansionist tendencies led to a shift towards Nanshin-ron to procure colonial resources in South East Asia and to neutralize the threat posed by Western military forces in the Pacific.

Both Japan and the USSR would signed the Soviet–Japanese Neutrality Pact in April 1941, which freed Japan for preparations for the Pacific War. When Nazi Germany launched its invasion of the Soviet Union in June 1941, Japan did not join its Axis ally's invasion by opening a second front in the Far East. Indeed, Japan did not militarily engage with the Soviet Union again until the Soviets declared war on Japan in August 1945.

== See also ==
- Axis powers negotiations on the division of Asia
- Pan-Asianism
