= Urzhin Garmaev =

White Army officer in the Manchukuo Imperial Army

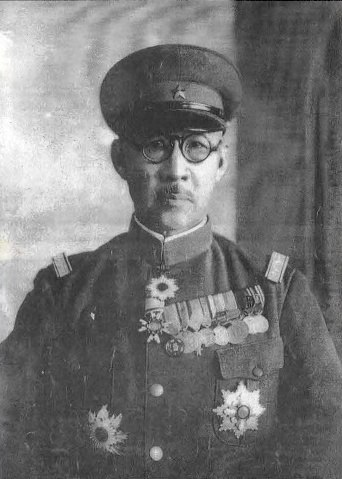
- Born: 1888; Makarovo Village, Transbaikal Oblast, Russian Empire
- Died: March 13, 1947 (aged 58–59) Moscow, Soviet Union
- Allegiance: Russian Empire; Manchukuo
- Branch: (Russian Empire) White Movement; Manchukuo Imperial Army
- Service years: 1918–1945
- Rank: Lieutenant General
- Conflicts: Russian Civil War; Second Sino-Japanese War; Soviet–Japanese Border War; Battles of Khalkhin Gol; World War II
- Awards: Order of the Rising Sun; Order of the Propitious Clouds (2nd class); Order of the Sacred Treasure

Urzhin Garmaevich Garmaev (Russian: Уржин Гарма́евич Гармаев; 1888 – 13 March 1947) was a Russian White Army officer, lieutenant general of the Japanese-controlled Manchukuo Imperial Army and general of Japanese Imperial Army. He was also the headmaster of the Xing'an Military School.

== Biography ==
Urzhin Garmaevich Garmaev was born in 1888 in Nerchinsky District of Transbaikal Oblast, Russian Empire.

An ethnic Buryat, in 1912 he graduated from the Chita municipal school and worked as a Russian and Buryat language teacher in Buryat settlements.

=== Russian Civil War ===
After the Russian Revolution in 1917, he became an opponent of the Bolsheviks. In the summer of 1918, Garmaev took part in recruiting and mustering of regiments from among the Buryat population for the Cossack Ataman Grigory Semyonov. In September 1918, the Japanese army occupied parts of Transbaikal region in an effort to help the White movement.

In April 1919, Garmaev graduated from a military school and received the rank of praporshchik (a junior officer rank in Imperial Russia), after which he served in the 1st Buryat-Mongolian Regiment.

In early 1920, Ataman Semyonov sent Garmaev on an important task to enter Outer Mongolia with a cavalry division and to establish an independent Mongolian state on the territory of Mongolia, China and Russia. However, the division has been destroyed by the Red Army later that year.

=== Emigration to Manchuria and World War II ===
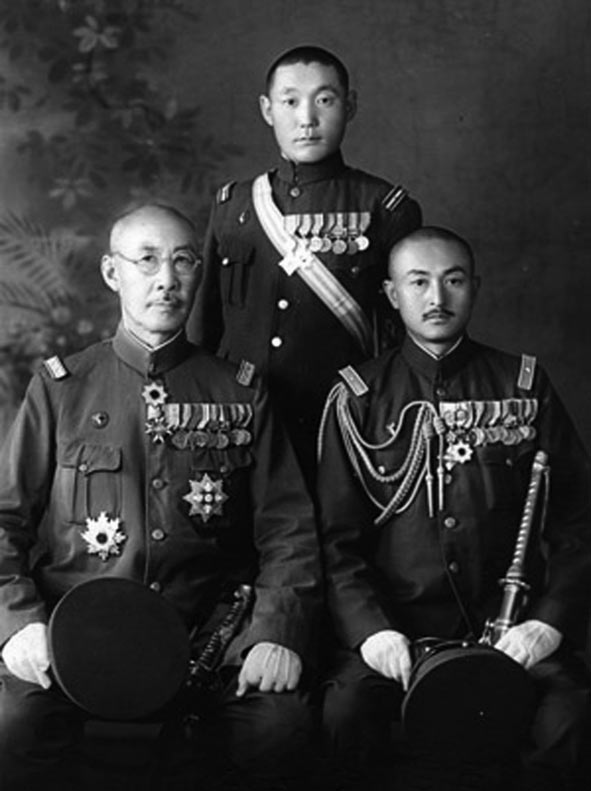
Manchukuo generals Urzhin Garmaev (left) and Jengjuurjab (right)

In 1920, the Bolsheviks reestablished control over Eastern Siberia. Urzhin Garmaev with his family and subordinates fled to Manchuria, and settled in what is present-day Evenk Autonomous Banner some 30 km south of Hailar. Here he maintained contacts with opponents of the Soviet regime and cooperated with Japanese intelligence. At the same time, he propagated the idea of creation of a unified Pan-Mongolian state.

In 1931, Japan attacked China and occupied Manchuria and created the puppet-state of Manchukuo. The Japanese offered Garmaev to recruit Buryat-Mongolian troops. He agreed and the Manchukuo War Department appointed him as a Commander of Northern Xing'an Security Forces (興安北省警備軍司令官) with a rank of major general. His troops were guarding the border with the Soviet Union and the Mongolian People's Republic.

In January 1935, during the Khalkhyn Temple border incident, Urjin with his troops was dispatched to the site. When the Manzhouli meeting to solve the border issue was subsequently held, Urjin also participated as a deputy of the Manchukuo delegation. In April 1936, the chief deputy of the Manchukuo delegation Ling Sheng (凌陞) was tried and executed for treason by Kempeitai. As a deputy during the conference, Urjin Garmaev also became a suspect, however, after a 5-minute interrogation by Manchukuo top-adviser Sasaki Tōichi he was cleared of all charges and released. During the second conference on the border conflict issue, Urjin Garmaev became the chief Manchukuo representative.

Urzhin Garmaev and his Northern Xing'an Security Forces of the 10th Military District also participated in the Nomonhan Incident, placed on the right flank of the Japanese 23rd Division. For his bravery in the battle, he was awarded a prize of ten thousand yen. In 1940, Garmaev was appointed commander of the 10th Army Military District of Manchukuo, and promoted to lieutenant general. His forces actively engaged in preparations for war with the Soviet Union and struggled with Soviet and Mongolian intelligence officers at the border. In December 1944, Garmaev was dismissed from his post as commander of the Military District due to the fact that he did not have the academic military education. In early 1945, Garmaev took office as the head of Xing'an Military School (陸軍興安学校) in Wangyehmiao.

On 9 August the Soviet Union declared war on Japan and the Red Army destroyed the Manchukuo Imperial Army and Japanese Kwantung Army in a short time during the Manchurian Strategic Offensive Operation.

=== Surrender and death ===
On 31 August, Urzhin Garmaev voluntarily surrendered to the Red Army in Xinjing. Convicted by the Military Collegium of the Supreme Court of the Soviet Union as a counterrevolutionary element, he was shot on 13 March 1947 in Moscow. On 23 June 1992, Garmaev was rehabilitated by the General Prosecutor's Office of the Russian Federation.

== Family ==
- Father - Garman Budaev
- Wife - Madyk Davaeva
- Son - Dashinima; 1945 College student government officials in Changchun; currently lives in Ulaanbaatar
- Daughter - Sandzhidma (b. 1937), until 1992 lived in China, then moved to Russia. Her two daughters, four grandchildren and one great-grandchild currently live in Ulan-Ude.
- Brother - Garmaev Daza
- Sister - Symzhit.

All in 1945 lived in Tumet-khoshuns Southern Khingan Province (Manchuria).

== Sources ==
- 田中克彦 『ノモンハン戦争―モンゴルと満洲国』 岩波書店〈岩波新書〉、2009年。ISBN 978-4004311911
- 牧南恭子 『五千日の軍隊―満洲国軍の軍官たち』 創林社、2004年。ISBN 978-4906153169
- Б.В.Базаров. Генерал-лейтенант Маньчжоу-Го Уржин Гармаев. – Улан-Удэ: Изд-во БНЦ СО РАН, 2001. – 37 с.ISBN 5-7925-0073-8
