= Battle of Khalkhyn Temple =

Border skirmish between Mongolia and Japan

- Part of Soviet–Japanese border conflicts
Date	8 January 1935
Location	Khalkhyn Temple, northeast of Buir Lake in present-day Inner Mongolia
Result	Mongolian victory

Belligerents
(Mongolian People's Republic) Mongolia	(Empire of Japan) Japan: Manchukuo

Commanders and leaders
(Mongolian People's Republic) Bataar Enkhjargal †	Unknown

Strength
90 mounted soldiers	30 soldiers

Casualties and losses
23–40 killed +40 wounded 12 horses killed	(Empire of Japan) 4 killed (Manchukuo) 10 killed

The Battle of Khalkhyn Temple (Mongolian: Халхын сүмийн мөргөлдөөн Khalkhyn sümiin mörgöldöön; Chinese: Halhamiao Incident, 哈爾哈廟事件; Japanese ハルハ廟事件 Haruhabyō-jiken) of 1935 was one of the border conflicts between the Soviet Union, Mongolia, Japan and Manchukuo which occurred from 1932 to 1939. The incident took place on the border of Manchukuo and Mongolia near the Buddhist temple of Khalkhyn (Temple of Khalkha), located northeast of Buir Lake in present-day Inner Mongolia, China. Scores of the cavalry of the Mongolian People's Army engaged with patrol units of the Manchukuo Imperial Army and Japanese soldiers.

== Attack ==
On 8 January 1935, a Mongolian cavalry unit consisting of 90 horsemen ambushed a Manchukuo Imperial Army (MIA) stationed around the vicinity of Khalkhyn Temple in disputed border territory.

During the reconnaissance around midday a patrol of about 30 MIA soldiers overseen by several Japanese military advisors setting up base along the lines. An ambush then took place wiping out the entire patrol, killing 11 Manchukuo soldiers along with several Japanese advisors and volunteers.

However the attack wasn't as swift as planned, at least 23 cavalrymen were gunned down by a machine-gun nest by the time they reached the patrol. As the Mongolians were charging at the defenders many of them were gunned down from Japanese machine gun-fire, resulting in dozens of deaths and at least 40 more were injured out of the 90 or so men. Among the dead was Bataar Enkhjargal, a noted and well respected Mongolian commander. But most of the cavalry managed to make it through the defense into the Manchukuoan base. After less than 30 minutes of fighting the imperial army broke apart and was forced to retreat, giving the Mongolians control of most of the present-day Outer Mongolia territory.

A Soviet official claimed that 23 Mongolians were killed in the incident including the commander, but the Japanese put the number much higher (40 killed). The Japanese claimed to have lost one officer and several other soldiers in the fighting, while their puppet Manchukuo lost up-to 10 soldiers.

== Reactions ==
This incident created great tension between Mongolia and Japan, with the death of a high ranked Japanese officer. This incident was the first of many Mongolian/Soviet-Japanese border conflicts.
