= Tauran Incident =

1936 Soviet-Japanese battle on the Mongolian border

- Part of the Soviet–Japanese border conflicts
Date	11–12 March 1936
Location	Tauran, Mongolia
Result	Japanese victory
Territorial changes	Recapture of the disputed territory

Belligerents
Mongolia; USSR	Japan: Manchukuo

Commanders and leaders
(Mongolian People's Republic) Jaija Bataar †	(Manchukuo) Unknown

Strength
128 soldiers 6 Soviet advisors	400 soldiers 10 armoured vehicles

Casualties and losses
58 killed or missing	27 killed 9 wounded

The Tauran Incident, was fought between forces of the Soviet Union, Mongolia, Japan and Manchukuo, during the Soviet–Japanese border conflicts, for control of the Mongolian border village of Tauran.

== Timeline ==
On 11 March, an army of less than 100 Mongolian soldiers with six Soviet advisors invaded the disputed village of Tauran, where they defeated the Manchurian defenders. Later that same day the Imperial Japanese Army with some Manchurian volunteers launched a massive attack to retake the village. The Japanese forces consisted of ten armored vehicles and dozens of warplanes, which bombed the village overnight. The next morning the Japanese launched their ground assault with a force of more than 400 soldiers and a few tanks. The Mongolians were slaughtered and barely did any damage to the Japanese as they were forced to retreat.
