= Soviet–Japanese border conflicts =

Armed conflict in the 1930s between the Soviets, Mongolians, and Japanese

- Part of the interwar period (until 1939) and World War II
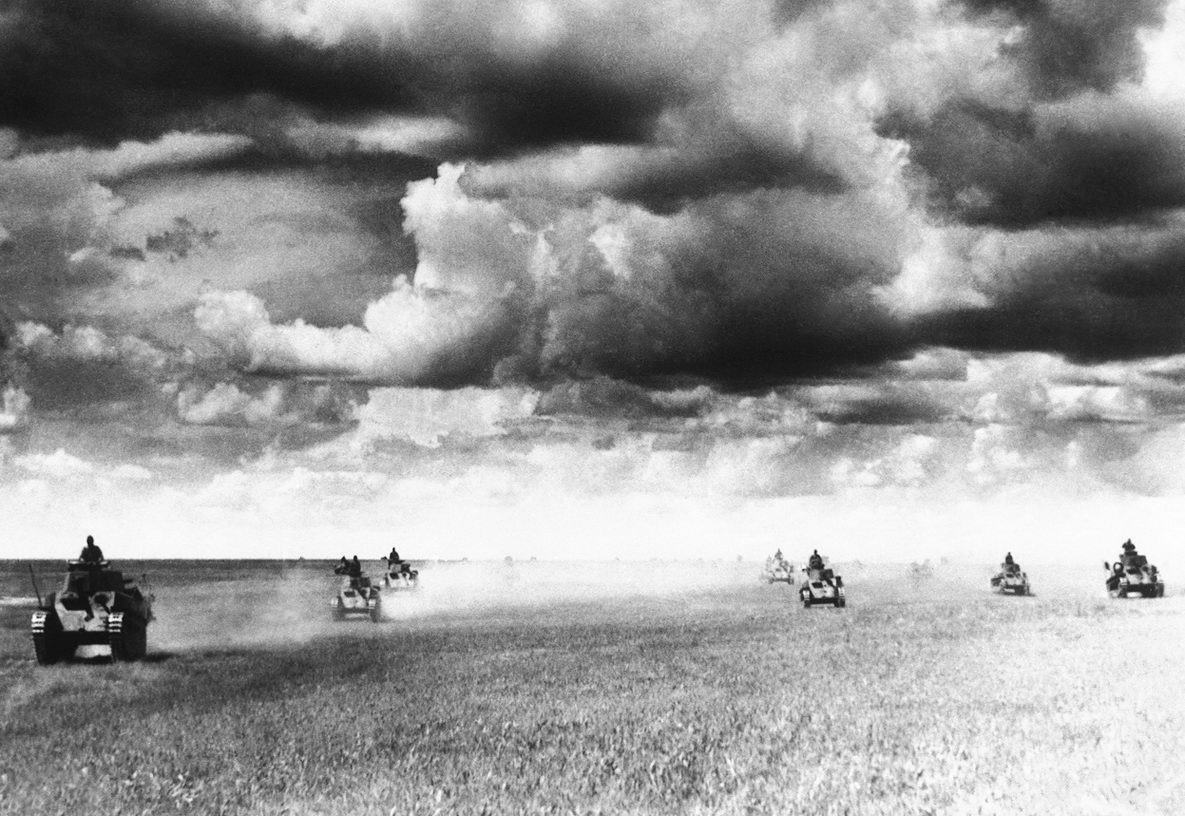
- Japanese light tanks during the Battles of Khalkhin Gol
Date	1 March 1932 – 16 September 1939 (7 years, 6 months, 2 weeks and 1 day)
Location	Northeast Asia (Mongolia, Primorsky Krai, Manchuria) 47.7303°N 118.5900°E
Result	Soviet–Mongolian victory

Belligerents
Soviet Union; Mongolia	Empire of Japan; Manchukuo

Commanders and leaders
(Soviet Union) Joseph Stalin; (Soviet Union) Georgy Zhukov; (Soviet Union) Grigory Shtern; (Soviet Union) Nikolai Berzarin; (Soviet Union) Yakov Smushkevich; (Soviet Union) Vasily Blyukher (executed); (Mongolian People's Republic) Khorloogiin Choibalsan; (Mongolian People's Republic) Bataar Enkhjargal †; (Mongolian People's Republic) Jaija Bataar †	(Empire of Japan) Emperor Hirohito (Empire of Japan) Kenkichi Ueda (Empire of Japan) Yoshijirō Umezu (Empire of Japan) Rensuke Isogai (Empire of Japan) Michitaro Komatsubara (Empire of Japan) Kōtoku Satō (Empire of Japan) Masaomi Yasuoka (Empire of Japan) Kamezō Suetaka (Empire of Japan) Mihara Kanae (Manchukuo) Urzhin Garmaev

Casualties and losses
Total: 30,443–32,418; (Soviet Union) 29,766–31,290; (Mongolian People's Republic) 677–1,128; Material losses: 350 tanks destroyed; 140 armoured cars destroyed; 211 aircraft destroyed	Total: 24,095–26,011; (Empire of Japan) 21,190–23,106; 2,905; Material losses: 43 tanks destroyed; several tankettes destroyed; 162 aircraft destroyed

The Soviet–Japanese border conflicts (Note: (romanized: Russian: Советско-Японские Пограничные Конфликты/Mongolian : Зөвлөлт–Японы хилийн мөргөлдөөнүүд/Japanese: 日ソ国境戦争/Korean: 소련-일본국경분쟁) were a series of minor and major conflicts fought between the Soviet Union (led by Joseph Stalin), Mongolia (led by Khorloogiin Choibalsan) and Japan (led by Hirohito) in Northeast Asia from 1932 to 1939.

The Japanese expansion in Northeast China created a common border between Japanese-occupied Manchuria and the Soviet Far East. This led to growing tensions with the Soviet Union, with both sides often engaging in border violations and accusing the other of doing so. The Soviets and Japanese, including their respective client states of Mongolia and Manchukuo, fought in a series of escalating small border skirmishes and punitive expeditions from 1935 until Soviet-Mongolian victory over the Japanese in the 1939 Battles of Khalkhin Gol, which resolved the dispute and returned the borders to status quo ante bellum.

The Soviet–Japanese border conflicts heavily contributed to the signing of the Soviet–Japanese Neutrality Pact in 1941.

== Prelude from 1904 to 1932 ==
In the aftermath of the First Sino-Japanese War and the Eight Power Intervention against the Boxer Rebellion in China, the Qing hold over Manchuria and Korea had weakened significantly, leading to both the Russian and Japanese Empires vying for control over the territories.

The Russo-Japanese War of 1904 to 1905 began when the Empire of Japan (led by Emperor Meiji) launched a surprise attack on the Russian Pacific Fleet stationed at Port Arthur on the Liaodong Peninsula. Following one and a half years of fighting between the Russian Army and the Japanese Army and the disastrous battle of Tsushima, the Russian Empire (led by Tsar Nicholas II) sued for peace, thereby recognizing Japan's claims to Korea and agreeing to evacuate Manchuria. Following the 1918 Siberian intervention by Japan in the Russian Civil War (during/after World War I) in the Russian Far East (later; the Soviet-Russian Far East) and fighting against Vladimir Lenin and the Soviet Bolshevik Communists from 1918 to 1922 after the Japanese took the German Qingdao Colony and the German Marshall Island Colonies from the German Empire (led by Kaiser Wilhelm II) in 1914 during WW1.

From 1918 to 1920 the Imperial Japanese Army (commanded by Emperor Taishō after Meiji died in 1912) were helping the White Army and Alexander Kerensky against the Bolshevik Red Army. In the same years they also helped the Czechoslovak Legion in Siberia to get back to Europe via the Trans-Siberian Railway. When the Czechoslovak Legion got back to Europe in 1920, Austria-Hungary had already collapsed and Czechoslovakia had been created two years before. Japan withdrew from the Russian Revolution and the Civil War in 1922. However, following its previous occupation in 1919 and the Soviet intervention in Mongolia of 1921, the Republic of China had to withdraw from Outer Mongolia in 1921. In 1922, after they captured Vladivostok in 1918 to stop the Bolsheviks in the Russian Far East during the Civil War, the Japanese had to retreat and withdraw back to Japan because the Bolsheviks led by Lenin were too powerful and everyone was tired of war after The Great War ended in 1918 (in Europe, Africa, Asia).

Following Hirohito's Japanese invasion of Manchuria in 1931–1932, (after Taisho's death in 1926) violations of the borders between Manchukuo, the Mongolian People's Republic and the Soviet Union took place frequently. Many of them were misunderstandings due to insufficiently marked nature of the border, but some were intentional acts of espionage. Between 1932 and 1934, according to the Imperial Japanese Army, 152 border disputes occurred, largely because the Soviets infiltrated Manchuria for intelligence purposes. The Soviets blamed the Japanese for 15 cases of border violation, 6 air intrusions, and 20 episodes of "spy smuggling" in 1933 alone. Hundreds of other violations were reported by both sides throughout the following years. To make matters worse, Soviet-Japanese diplomacy and trust had declined even further, with the Japanese being openly called "fascist enemies" at the Seventh Comintern Congress in July 1935.

== Minor clashes between the Soviets and Japanese ==
=== 1935 Incidents ===
In early 1935 around January or February, the first shooting affray took place. From then until April 1939, the Imperial Japanese Army recorded 108 such incidents. On 8 January 1935, the first armed clash, the Halhamiao incident (哈爾哈廟事件, Haruhabyō jiken), occurred on the border between Mongolia and Manchukuo. Several dozen cavalrymen of the Mongolian People's Army trespassed in Manchuria near some disputed fishing grounds, and engaged an 11-man Manchukuo Imperial Army patrol unit near the Buddhist temple at Halhamiao, which was led by a Japanese military advisor. The Manchukuo Army incurred slight casualties, suffering 6 wounded and 2 dead, including the Japanese officer. The Mongols suffered no casualties, and withdrew when the Japanese sent a punitive expedition to reclaim the disputed area. Two motorized cavalry companies, a machine gun company, and a tankette platoon were sent and occupied the point for three weeks without resistance.

In June 1935, the Japanese and Soviets directly exchanged fire for the first time when an 11-man Japanese patrol west of Lake Khanka was attacked by 6 Soviet horsemen, supposedly inside Manchukuo territory. In the ensuing firefight, one Soviet soldier was killed, and two horses were captured. While the Japanese asked the Soviets for a joint investigation of the issue, the Soviets rejected the request.

In October 1935, nine Japanese and 32 Manchukuoan border guards were engaged in setting up a post, about 20 kilometers north of Suifenho, when they were attacked by a force of 50 Soviet soldiers. The Soviets opened fire on them with rifles and 5 heavy machine guns. In the ensuing clash, two Japanese and four Manchukuoan soldiers were killed, and another 5 were wounded. The Manchukuoan foreign affairs representative lodged a verbal protest with the Soviet consul at Suifenho. The Imperial Japanese Army's Kwantung Army also sent an intelligence officer to investigate the scene of the clash.

On 19 December 1935, a Manchukuoan army unit engaging in a reconnoitering project southwest of Buir Lake clashed with a Mongolian party, reportedly capturing 10 soldiers. Five days later, 60 truck-borne Mongolian troops assaulted the Manchukuoans and were repulsed, at the cost of 3 Manchukuoan dead. The same day, at Brunders, Mongolian soldiers attempted to drive out Manchukuoan forces three times in the day, and then again at a night, but all attempts failed. More small attempts to dislodge the Manchukuoans from their outposts occurred in January, with the Mongolians this time utilizing airplanes for recon duty. Due to the arrival of a small force of Japanese troops in three trucks, these attempts also failed with a few casualties on both sides. Aside from the 10 prisoners taken, Mongolian casualties during these clashes are unknown.

=== 1936 border incidents ===
In February 1936, Lieutenant-Colonel Sugimoto Yasuo was ordered to form a detachment from the 14th Cavalry Regiment and, in the words of Lieutenant-General Kasai Heijuro, "out the Outer Mongol intruders from the Olankhuduk region". Sugimoto's detachment included cavalry guns, heavy machine guns, and tankettes. Arrayed against him were 140 Mongolians, equipped with heavy machine guns and light artillery. On February 12, Sugimoto's men successfully drove the Mongolians south, at the cost of eight men killed, four men wounded, and one tankette destroyed. After this, they began to withdraw, but were attacked by 5-6 Mongolian armored cars and 2 bombers, which briefly wreaked havoc on a Japanese column. This was rectified when the unit obtained artillery support, enabling it to destroy or drive off the armored cars.

In March 1936, the Tauran incident (タウラン事件, Tauran jiken) (ja) occurred. In this battle, both the Japanese Army and Mongolian Army used a small number of armored fighting vehicles and military aircraft. The Tauran incident of March 1936 occurred as the result of 100 Mongolian and six Soviet troops attacking and occupying the disputed village of Tauran, Mongolia, driving off the small Manchurian garrison in the process. They were supported by a handful of light bombers and armored cars, though their bombing sorties failed to inflict any damage on the Japanese, and three of them were shot down by Japanese heavy machine guns. Local Japanese forces counter-attacked, running dozens of bombing sorties on the village, and eventually assaulting it with 400 men and 10 tankettes. The result was a Mongolian rout, with 56 soldiers being killed, including three Soviet advisors, and an unknown number being wounded. Japanese losses amounted to 27 killed and nine wounded.

Later in March 1936, there was another border clash, this time between the Japanese and the Soviets. Reports of border violations led the Japanese Korean Army to send ten men by truck to investigate, but this party itself was ambushed by 20 Soviet NKVD soldiers deployed at a point 300 meters inside the territory claimed by the Japanese. After incurring several casualties, the Japanese patrol withdrew, and brought up 100 men within hours as reinforcements, who then drove off the Soviets. However, fighting erupted later in the day when the NKVD also brought reinforcements. By nightfall, the fighting had stopped and both sides had pulled back. The Soviets agreed to return the bodies of two Japanese soldiers who died in the fighting, which was seen as encouraging by the Japanese government.

In early April 1936, three Japanese soldiers were killed near Suifenho, in one of many minor and barely documented affrays. However, this incident was notable in that the Soviets again returned the bodies of the dead servicemen.

=== 1937 ===
==== Kanchazu Island incident ====
In June 1937, the Kanchazu Island incident (乾岔子島事件, Kanchazutou jiken) (ja) occurred on the Amur River at the Soviet–Manchukuo border. Three Soviet gunboats crossed the center line of the river, unloaded troops, and occupied Kanchazu (also spelled "Kanchatzu") island. Soldiers from the IJA 1st Division, using two horse-drawn 37mm artillery pieces, proceeded to hastily set up improvised firing sites, and load their guns with both high-explosive and armor-piercing shells. They shelled the Soviets, sinking the lead gunboat, crippling the second, and driving off the third. Japanese troops then fired on the swimming crewmen of the sunken ships with machine guns. 37 Soviet soldiers were killed in this incident; the Japanese forces suffered no casualties. The Japanese Ministry of Foreign Affairs protested and demanded the Soviet soldiers withdraw from the island. The Soviet leadership, apparently shocked by the display and not wanting things to escalate, agreed and evacuated their forces.

==== Soviet involvement in China 1937–1941 during the Second Sino-Japanese War ====
In July 1937, the Japanese invaded China, starting the Second Sino-Japanese War. Soviet-Japanese relations were chilled by the invasion and Mikhail Kalinin, the Soviet head of state, told the American ambassador William C. Bullitt in Moscow that same month that his country was prepared for an attack by Nazi Germany in the west and Japan in the east. During the first two years of the war, the Soviets heavily aided the Chinese, increasing tension with Japan. From October 1937 to September 1939, the Soviets supplied the Chinese with 82 tanks, over 1,300 pieces of artillery, over 14,000 machine guns, 50,000 rifles, 1,550 trucks and tractors, and also ammunition, equipment and supplies. They also provided 3,665 military advisors and volunteers as part of the Soviet Volunteer Group. 195 of these men, almost all officers, died in battle against Japanese forces. Large-scale aid ceased by the end of the Soviet–Japanese border conflicts.

== Battle of Lake Khasan (1938) ==
The Battle of Lake Khasan (29 July – 11 August 1938), also known as the "Changkufeng Incident" (Chinese: 张鼓峰事件; pinyin: Zhānggǔfēng Shìjiàn, Japanese pronunciation: Chōkohō Jiken) in China and Japan, was an attempted military incursion from Manchukuo (by the Japanese) into territory claimed by the Soviet Union. This incursion was founded in the belief of the Japanese side that the Soviet Union misinterpreted the demarcation of the boundary based on the Convention of Peking treaty between the former Imperial Russia and Qing dynasty of China (and subsequent supplementary agreements on demarcation), and furthermore, that the demarcation markers had been tampered with. The Japanese 19th Division expelled a Soviet garrison from the disputed area, and repulsed numerous counterattacks by an overwhelmingly more numerous and heavily armed Soviet force. Both sides took heavy losses. The conflict was resolved diplomatically on August 10, when the Japanese ambassador in Moscow asked for peace. The Japanese troops withdrew the next day, and the Soviets re-occupied the area.

== Major conflicts of 1939 ==
The conflict between the Soviet Union and Japan in 1939 is referred to by some historians as the "Forgotten Soviet-Japanese War." It had a lasting and significant impact on Japanese strategic decisions in World War II.

=== Battles of Khalkhin Gol ===
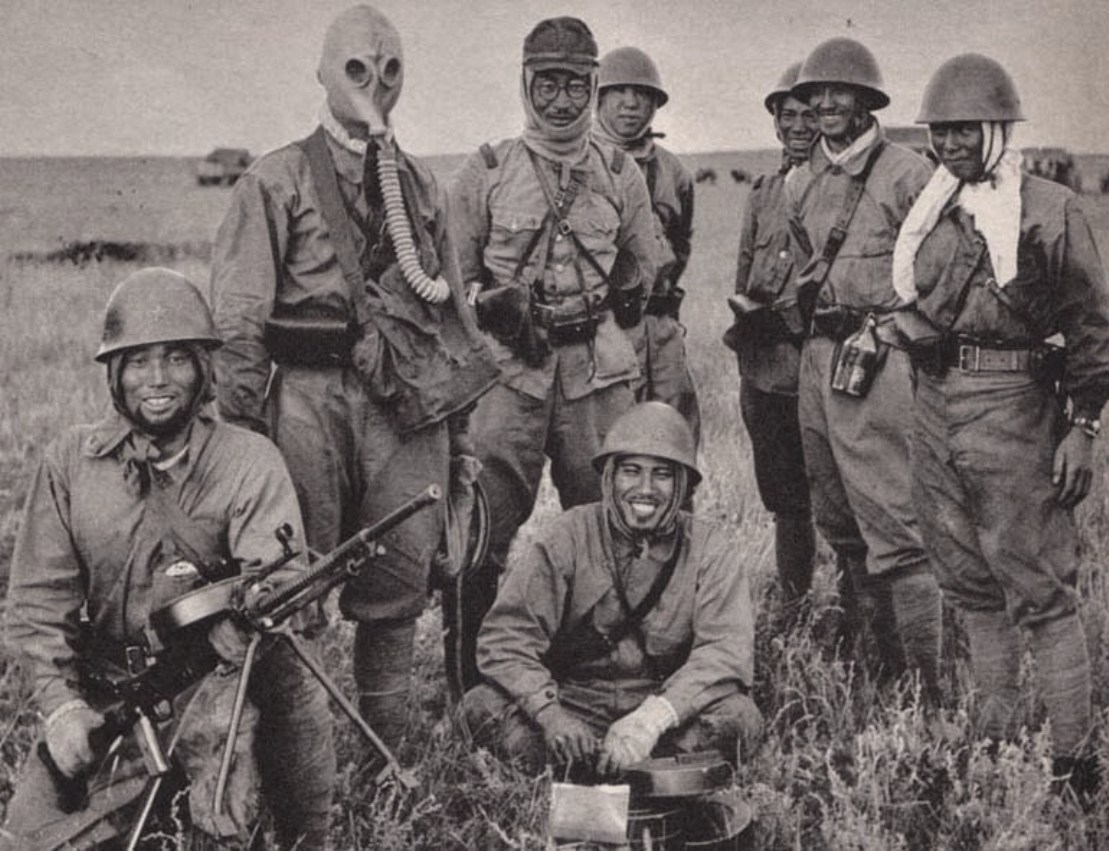
Japanese soldiers pose with captured Soviet equipment during the Battle of Khalkhin Gol.

The Battle of Khalkhin Gol, sometimes spelled Halhin Gol or Khalkin Gol after the Halha River passing through the battlefield and known in Japan as the Nomonhan Incident, was the decisive battle of the undeclared Soviet–Japanese Border War. After skirmishes in May and June 1939, engagements with corps-sized forces took place, though the Soviets were again far more numerous and more heavily armed than the Japanese. There were three principal engagements:

- The initial Japanese attack in July (2–25 July), intended to wipe out the materially and numerically superior Soviets. The Soviets suffered very heavy losses compared to the Japanese and minor gains were made by the Japanese, but stubborn resistance and an armored counter-blow stalled the Japanese attack. It drifted into a stalemate with skirmishing.
- The failed Soviet probing attacks in early August (7–8 and 20 August) which were thrown back with no gains and considerable casualties. In the intermediate period between these three phases, the Soviets built up their forces, while the Japanese were forbidden from doing so for fear of escalating the conflict.
- The successful Soviet counteroffensive in late August at Nomonhan with a fully built-up force that encircled the remains of the 23rd Division and by 31 August had destroyed all Japanese forces on the Soviet side of the river.

In this engagement the Soviets and Mongolians defeated the Japanese, and expelled them from Mongolia. The Soviet Union and Japan agreed to a cease-fire on 15 September, which took effect the following day. Free from a threat in the Soviet Far East, Stalin proceeded with the Soviet invasion of Poland on 17 September 1939 after he made a deal with the German Reich.

=== Soviet–Japanese Neutrality Pact of 1941–1945 ===
After the Japanese defeat at Khalkhin Gol, Japan and the Soviet Union signed the Soviet–Japanese Neutrality Pact on 13 April 1941, which was similar to the Molotov–Ribbentrop Pact between the Germans and the Soviet Union of August 1939. Later in 1941, Japan considered breaking the pact when Nazi Germany invaded the Soviet Union in Operation Barbarossa but they made the crucial decision to keep it and to continue to press the Nanshin-ron into Southeast Asia instead, starting with the Japanese attack on Pearl Harbor. This was said to be largely due to the Battle of Khalkhin Gol. The defeat there caused Japan to give up the Hokushin-ron scheme, and not join forces with Germany against the Soviet Union, even though Japan and Germany were part of the Tripartite Pact. On 5 April 1945, the Soviet Union unilaterally denounced the neutrality pact, noting that it would not renew the treaty when it expired on 13 April 1946. Four months later, prior to the expiration of the neutrality pact and between the atomic bombings of Hiroshima and Nagasaki, the Soviet Union declared war on Japan, completely surprising the Japanese. The Soviet invasion of Manchuria was launched in 1945 one hour after the declaration of war on Japan .

== Portrayal in media ==
The fighting early in World War II between Japan and the Soviet Union plays a key part in the South Korean film My Way, in which Japanese soldiers (including Koreans in Japanese service) fight and are captured by the Soviets and forced to fight for them.

In the Japanese novel The Wind-Up Bird Chronicle by Haruki Murakami the story frequently involves analepsis of the Japanese involvement in North China during the 1931–1948 period including the Soviet–Japanese border conflicts. Two side characters in the novel, Lieutenant Mamiya and Mr Honda who served in the Kwantung army, were severely mentally and physically affected by a (fictional) failed raid into the Mongolian People's Republic and the following battle of the Battles of Khalkhin Gol. The novel explains these events in detail, particularly the failed raid, and it plays an important role in the larger story.

== See also ==
- Battles of Khalkhin Gol
- Chinese Eastern Railway and the South Manchuria Railway
- Kantokuen
- Mongolia in World War II
- Russo-Japanese War
- Sino-Soviet conflict (1929)
- Soviet Invasion of Xinjiang
- Soviet–Japanese War
- Sino-Soviet border conflict

== Bibliography ==
- Coox, Alvin D. (1990). Nomonhan: Japan Against Russia, 1939. Stanford University Press. ISBN 978-0-8047-1835-6.
- Walg, A. J. (March–April 1997). "Wings over the Steppe: Aerial Warfare in Mongolia 1930–1945, Part Three". Air Enthusiast. No. 68. pp. 70–73. ISSN 0143-5450.
