= Rehe Guard Army =

Corps of the Manchukuo Imperial Army

The Rehe Guard Army was a corps of the Manchukuo Imperial Army, formed after the conquest of the former Chinese province of Rehe during Operation Nekka in 1933. The Rehe Guard Army was created from a section of the Taoliao Army and had a nominal strength of 17,945 men

- Headquarters (301)
- Artillery Unit (854)
- Cavalry Unit (172)
- Infantry Unit (1,294)
- Chengde Area Forces (4,783)
- Chifeng Area Forces (3,414)
- Chaoyang Area Forces (3,977)
- Weichang Area Forces (3,150)
- Xinjing Cavalry Brigade (2,018)
- Seiyan Army (Fangtian Area Forces) (3,760)
- River Patrol Unit (640)

In the 1935 reorganization of the Manchukuo Imperial Army it became the 5th District Army "Chengde" under command of General Chang Hai-peng.

== Sources ==
- Jowett, Philip (2005). Rays of the Rising Sun, Volume 1: Japan's Asian Allies 1931–45, China and Manchukuo. Helion and Company Ltd. ISBN 1-874622-21-3.
