= Zhang Haipeng =

Chinese general (1867–1951)

Zhang Haipeng; Chang Hai-p'eng
- 張海鵬
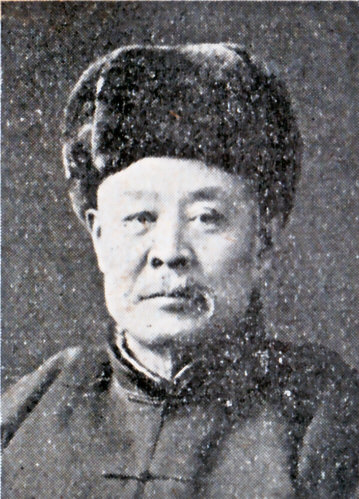
- Zhang Haipeng before 1928

Governor of Rehe Province
- In office March 1933 – November 1934
- Monarch: Puyi
- Preceded by: Position established
- Succeeded by: Liu Menggeng

Personal details
- Born: 1867 Gaizhou, Liaoning Province, Qing dynasty
- Died: 1951 (aged 83–84) Beijing, People's Republic of China
- Citizenship: Manchukuo
- Education: Northeast Military Academy

Military service
- Allegiance: Qing dynasty; China (Beiyang Government); Fengtian clique; Manchukuo
- Branch/service: Northeastern Army; Manchukuo Imperial Army; Taoliao Army/Rehe Guard Army
- Unit: (Fengtian) 2nd Provincial Defense Brigade

Zhang Haipeng (simplified Chinese: 张海鹏; traditional Chinese: 張海鵬; pinyin: Zhāng Hǎipéng; Wade–Giles: Chang Hai-p'eng, Hepburn: Chō Kaihō; 1867–1951), was a Chinese Northeastern Army general, who went over to the Japanese during the Invasion of Manchuria and became a general in the Manchukuo Imperial Army of the State of Manchuria.

== Biography ==
Zhang was a member of the Honghuzi irregular cavalry forces of the Manchurian warlord Feng Delin during the First Sino-Japanese War. These forces were recruited as mercenaries by the Japanese during the Russo-Japanese War from 1904 to 1905. He subsequently studied at the Northeast Military Academy built by Gen. Zhao Erxun. Following the Xinhai Revolution, he was assigned command of an infantry regiment under the Republic of China; however, he supported Zhang Xun's abortive attempt to restore the Qing dynasty in 1917. He afterwards joined forces with Manchurian warlord Zhang Zuolin. In 1923 he was appointed a commissioner of the Chinese Eastern Railway and participated in the First Zhili–Fengtian War. in early 1931 his forces were involved in the suppression of the Gada Meiren uprising.

In early October 1931, shortly after the Mukden Incident at Taonan in the northwest of Liaobei province, Zhang—who was commander of the 2nd Provincial Defense Brigade—took command of the local forces including the Xing'an Reclamation Army and declared the district independent of China, in return for a shipment of a large quantity of military supplies by the Imperial Japanese Army.

Zhang followed up his political move by leading the men of the Xing'an Reclamation Army north to attack Gen. Ma Zhanshan, the newly appointed governor of Heilongjiang province. Soon after Zhang advanced upon Ma's capital at Qiqihar, Ma offered to surrender it. Encouraged by Japanese Kwantung Army Gen. Shigeru Honjō, Zhang advanced cautiously to accept Ma's surrender. However, Zhang's advance guard was attacked by Ma's troops in the Resistance at Nenjiang Bridge and it was routed.

Following the establishment of the State of Manchukuo in March 1932, Zhang was reappointed to command his old force, which was now renamed the Taoliao Army. He led Manchukouan troops against the Anti-Japanese Volunteer Armies during the Pacification of Manchukuo and in the Japanese invasion of Rehe in Operation Nekka. Afterwards he was appointed to command the newly organized Rehe Guard Army, which became the 5th District Army "Chengde" after the 1934 reorganization of the Manchukuoan Army. From March 1933 to November 1934 he was Governor of Rehe Province. He was promoted to full general in the Manchukuo Army in 1936. He was also chief aide-de-camp to Emperor Puyi. In March 1941, he retired.

After the collapse of Manchukuo in April 1945, Zhang went into hiding in Tianjin, but was discovered, tried and executed for treason by the People's Republic of China in 1951 in Beijing.

== Sources ==
- Boycott, Bloodshed & Puppetry From TIME magazine Oct. 26, 1931
- Jowett, Phillip J., Rays of the Rising Sun Vol 1., Helion & Co. Ltd. 2004.
- Rugui, Guo (2005). China's Anti-Japanese War Combat Operations. Jiangsu People's Publishing House. ISBN 7-214-03034-9.
