= Taoliao Army =

Northeastern People's Revolutionary Army
- Simplified Chinese: 洮遼軍
- Traditional Chinese: 洮辽军
Transcriptions
Standard Mandarin
- Hanyu Pinyin: Táoliáojūn

The Taoliao Army was the former Hsingan Reclamation Army that had gone over to the Japanese during the invasion of Manchuria. It was involved in Operation Nekka that captured Rehe. Following which in 1933 it became the Rehe Guard Army. It had the same commander throughout, Chang Hai-peng.

The Taoliao Army was part of the Manchukuoan Army formed upon the foundation of the state of Manchukuo. It was composed of at least eight Detachments. The 1st, 4th, 5th, 7th and 8th Detachments are mentioned in Anti Bandit Operations against Feng Zhanhai and Mongolian bandits in the summer of 1932. At the time of Operation Nekka in January 1933, seven Detachments are mentioned as being in the Manchukuoan force of 40,000 men attached to the Japanese invasion army.
