= Manchukuo Imperial Army =

1932–1945 ground force

- 滿洲國軍; Mǎnzhōuguó jūn
- War flag of Manchukuo
- Active: 1932–1945
- Country: Manchukuo
- Allegiance: Manchukuo government (de jure); Empire of Japan (de facto)
- Type: Army
- Size: 111,000 (1933); 170,000–220,000 (1945)
- Engagements: Pacification of Manchukuo; Inner Mongolian Campaign; Operation Nekka; Battle of Rehe; Second Sino-Japanese War; Soviet-Japanese Border Wars; Battle of Lake Khasan; Battle of Khalkhin Gol; World War II; Soviet-Japanese War; Manchurian Strategic Offensive Operation

Commanders
- Emperor of Manchukuo: Puyi
- Minister of Defense: See list
- Notable commanders: Aisin-Gioro Xiqia; Zhang Haipeng; Zhang Jinghui; Yu Zhishan

Insignia
- Five-colored star

The Manchukuo Imperial Army (Chinese: 滿洲國軍; pinyin: Mǎnzhōuguó jūn) was the army of Manchukuo, a puppet state established by the Empire of Japan in Manchuria. Established in 1932, it was primarily involved in counterinsurgency operations against Communist and Kuomintang guerrillas in Manchukuo, and also fought against the Red Army on several occasions. Initially consisting of National Revolutionary Army deserters who had served under Zhang Xueliang and were recruited en masse after the Japanese invasion of Manchuria, the Manchukuo Imperial Army was gradually expanded using a mixture of volunteers and conscripts.

From 1933 to 1945, it expanded in size from approximately 111,000 personnel to an estimated strength of between 170,000 and 220,000 at its peak in 1945. The Manchukuo Imperial Army's ethnic makeup was diverse, consisting of Han Chinese, Manchu, Mongol, Korean, Japanese and White Russian personnel. Throughout its existence, the majority of the Manchukuo Imperial Army's units were considered to be mostly unreliable by their Japanese officers and advisers due to poor training and equipment along with low morale. It was officially disbanded in 1945 with the end of World War II in Asia and disestablishment of Manchukuo.

== History ==
=== Establishment ===
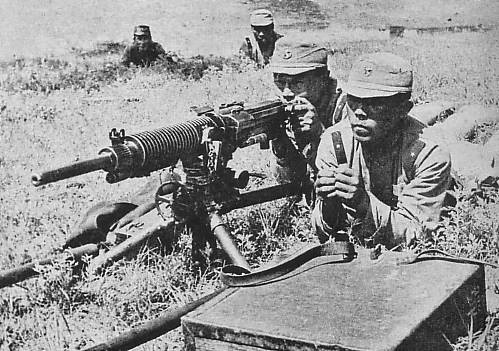
Military exercise of the Manchukuo Imperial Army

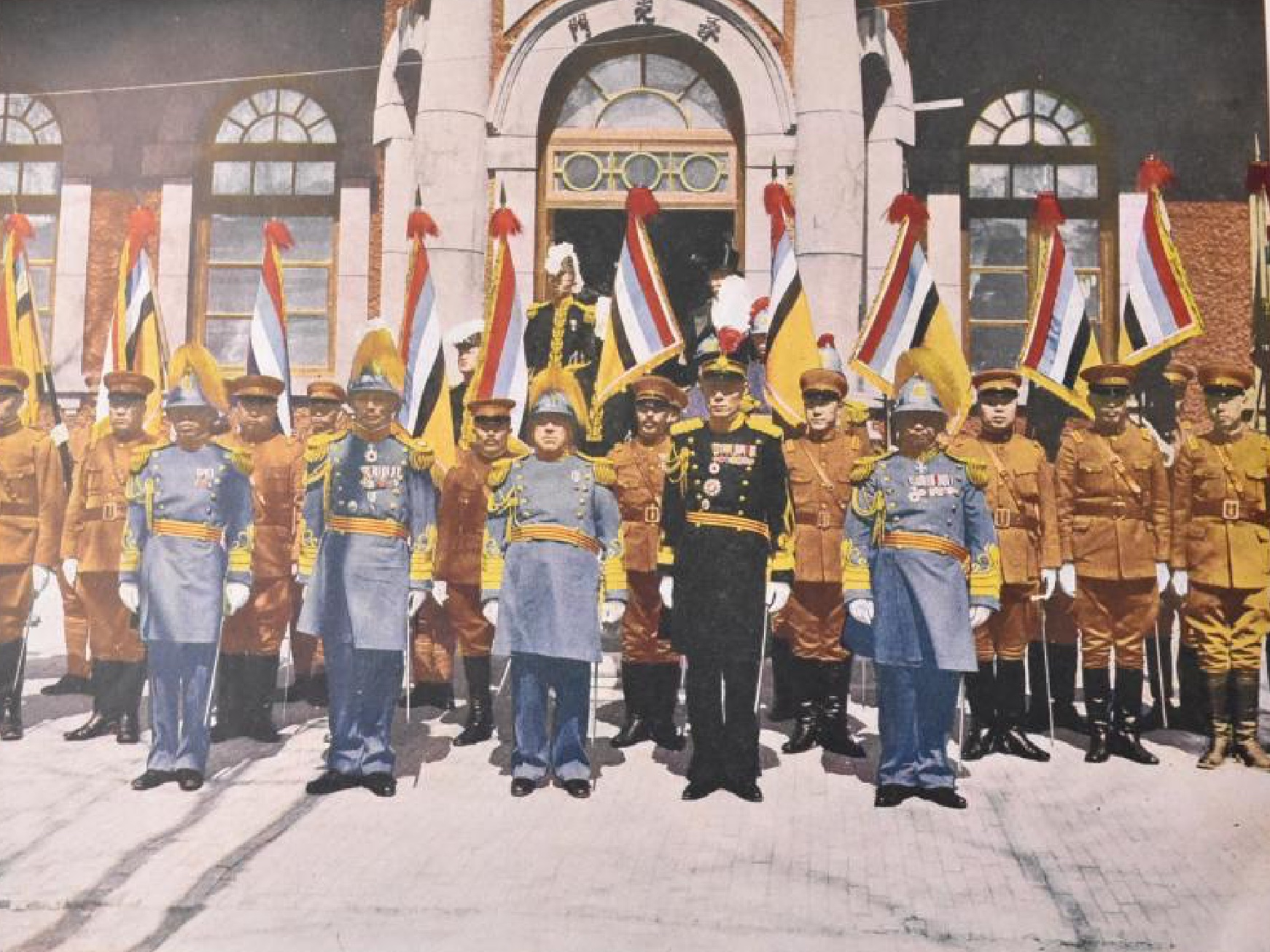
Manchukuo Imperial Army generals

After the Japanese invasion of Manchuria in September 1931 and the creation of the puppet state of Manchukuo on 18 February 1932, they began raising an army to help them police the local population. The Manchukuoan armed forces were officially established by the Army and Navy Act of 15 April 1932 to maintain order in the new country. Former Qing dynasty emperor Puyi, who was later known by the era name Kangde upon his ascension to the throne of Manchukuo in 1934, had supreme command of the land, naval, and air forces. The Imperial Army's initial recruits came from the former Chinese Nationalist troops in the army of Zhang Xueliang, the warlord who had ruled Manchuria prior to the Japanese invasion. Large numbers of Chinese soldiers had surrendered to the Imperial Japanese Army and were recruited en masse into the new Manchukuoan forces. About 60,000 of these troops gave themselves up and many more were later absorbed into the Imperial Army. Other recruits included local bandit groups and volunteers.

Many of the Nationalist troops that formerly served under the Young Marshal Zhang Xueliang had received poor training and had little loyalty to anyone, with a high proportion of them being opium addicts. As a result, the new force was regarded as mostly unreliable by the Japanese, who decided to employ Zhang Xueliang's former troops because they provided a numerically large and already-trained (albeit poorly) army. Their performance against bandit groups was dismal. It was reported that in May 1932 a unit of 2,000 Manchukuoan troops were "driven like sheep" by a group of outlaws they were operating against. Their lack of loyalty to the new regime was demonstrated by the significant number of mutinies that occurred in those years. In August 1932, a unit of about 2,000 men deserted their garrison at Wukimiho, taking their weapons over to the anti-Japanese guerrillas. Likewise, the entire 7th Cavalry Regiment revolted around the same time and joined the partisans as well. According to Japanese officers, there were many cases of Manchukuoan troops giving their weapons to the enemies they were sent to attack.

In its first form the Manchukuo Imperial Army was organized in seven Provincial Guard Armies (one for each province), with a total of about 111,000 men. An Independent Cavalry Brigade was created to provide a garrison for the capital of Xinjing, and the Manchukuo Imperial Guard was raised in February 1933 from men of Manchu ethnic backgrounds as part of the capital garrison to provide protection for Emperor Puyi and senior government officials. The Japanese intended to replace the unreliable former troops of Zhang Xueliang with those trained by them and the government of Manchukuo as soon as circumstances permitted. As part of this effort, a new law signed in 1934 stated that only those trained by the Manchukuoan government could serve as officers. It was done to remove those former Nationalist officers who had been in Zhang Xueliang's forces and break the tradition of warlordism.

In 1938, military academies were established in Mukden and Xinjing order to provide the Imperial Army with more reliable troops. A Central Training School for junior officers was opened in Mukden. The first class of 200 officer cadets graduated in November 1938, followed by 70 others in January 1939. Another class graduated in 1940, which included 97 cadets. After this, the number of native volunteers had dried up and the school accepted 174 Japanese recruits, who went on to serve in both the Manchukuoan army and the Japanese reserves. The military academy in Xinjing had its first class graduation in July 1938, which included 34 cadets. In addition, a signal school, medical school, and gendarmerie training school were established in Manchukuo. A military academy specifically for ethnic Mongols was established in 1934, taking in 100 cadets for a two-year course. The course included religious teachings and other classes to foster a patriotic Mongol spirit in the cadets. This first class graduated in the late 1930s.

An important factor that allowed for the expansion of the Manchukuoan army was conscription. The Military Supplies Requisition Law of 13 May 1937 allowed the Manchukuoan and Japanese armies to conscript laborers, as well as allowing them to appropriate land and materials for the purposes of keeping order. The draft of soldiers did not begin until April 1940 and was not officially signed into law until 1941, which allowed every able-bodied male between the ages of eighteen and forty to be called up, of all ethnic groups. All youths were required to get a physical and then 10% of them were selected for service. Education, physical fitness, and their families' loyalty to the regime were things taken into consideration for selecting conscripts. When this was not enough, the Japanese forcibly drafted males from across the country into the army, and many efforts were taken to foster a Manchukuoan patriotic spirit among the troops.

=== Counterinsurgency operations ===
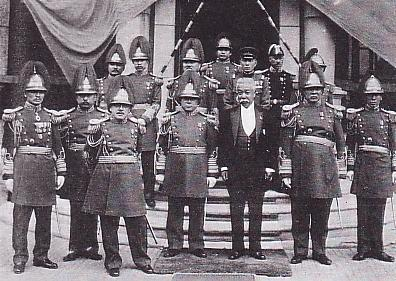
Manchukuo Imperial Army officers

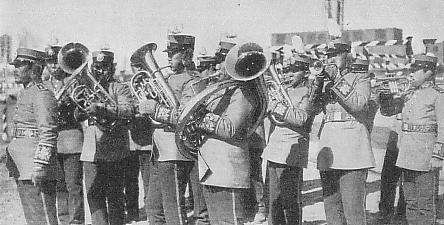
Manchukuo Army marching band

In its early years, the Empire of Manchukuo was home to many resistance groups that fought against it and the Japanese occupation forces. Many of those guerrilla fighters were civilians, but a great many were former soldiers of Zhang Xueliang's army that decided to continue to resist on their own rather than surrender or leave Manchuria. One of the more notable resistance leaders was Ma Zhanshan, whose army fought rearguard actions as Zhang Xueliang's main force retreated south. The Japanese were impressed with him and decided to recruit him by offering a large sum of money to the general. Ma initially accepted the offer from Colonel Kenji Doihara and briefly served as the state of Manchukuo's war minister. He used the opportunity to equip and arm his troops before deserting en masse to fight against the Japanese again.

The number of insurgents in Manchukuo swelled from 130,000 initially to more than 300,000. The problem became so severe that the Japanese launched a number of anti-guerrilla operations throughout the early and mid-1930s. The operations saw the usage of Imperial Army troops in support of the IJA and were largely successful, confining the remaining insurgents to the northeast of the country and greatly reducing their numbers. They were complicated by the fact that many of the Manchukuoan troops had little loyalty to their new regime and frequently switched sides, or warned the bandits of the coming attacks. These operations often involved a smaller vanguard of Japanese troops doing much of the fighting with a larger Manchukuoan contingent that played a supporting role. A law enacted in September 1932 titled "Provisional Punishment of Bandits" allowed for captured insurgents to be executed. The War Ministry of Manchukuo provided monetary rewards for officers of units that killed insurgents. The Imperial Army suffered significant casualties during the period from 1932 to 1935 during these operations, losing 1,470 killed and 1,261 wounded. The first campaign conducted by Manchukuoan troops independently of the Japanese did not occur until 1936, when some 16,000 men took part in fighting the 1st Route Army, capturing or killing more than 2,000 insurgents.

Some of the notable early operations that Manchukuoan troops were involved in included:

- Subjugation of the Anti-Jilin Army (March–June 1932): A campaign undertaken by Japanese forces and several Manchukuoan units to clear out 20,000 Nationalist troops from the Jilin region. The units involved were the 7th and 8th Infantry Brigades along with the 2nd and 3rd Cavalry Brigades, for a total of 7,000 men. Several ships of the River Defense Fleet also took part. The Nationalists were pushed back to the north of the province and the Sungari River was secured.
- First Dongbiandao Clearance (May–June 1932): When a Manchukuoan commander revolted and surrounded the Japanese consulate in Donghe a force of Japanese police was sent to relieve it, along with 1st and 2nd detachments of the Fengtian Guard Army as support. They totaled 4,000 men. Although the mutineers were forced to retreat, the Manchukuoan troops performed poorly and took considerable losses.
- Ma Zhanshan Subjugation (April–July 1932): A campaign that was launched against the headquarters of Ma Zhanshan. Manchukuoan forces numbered 5,000 men and included detachments from the Heilongjiang Guard Army. They fought alongside Japanese troops during the operation. The poor performance of the Manchukuoans during the fight allowed his guerrillas to escape.
- Li Haijing Subjugation (May 1932): An attack launched by a force of 6,000 troops from the 1st Infantry and 2nd Cavalry Brigades of the Heilongjiang Guard Army, the 1st Cavalry Brigade of the Jilin Guard Army, and the 1st, 4th, and 7th detachments of the Taoliao Army. It fought against a group of 10,000 insurgents in the southern Heilongjiang province. The joint Japanese-Manchukuoan force successfully drove out the insurgents.
- First Feng Zhanghai Subjugation (June 1932): A series of skirmishes between the units of the Jilin Guard Army and local guerrillas. Manchukuoan forces included the Jilin Railway Guards, Cavalry Corps and the 1st Infantry Brigade, in total 1,600 men. The Manchukuoans lost 150 men killed while claiming to have killed 1,000 guerrillas.
- Second Feng Zhanghai Subjugation (June–July 1932): An operation to clear out several districts from anti-Japanese fighters. The Manchukuoan contingent included units from the Taoliao and Jilin Guard Armies. The force totaled 7,000 men, and with Japanese assistance managed to drive out 15,000 insurgents.
- Mongolian Bandit Subjugation Operation (August 1932): Mongolian bandits attacked the Sidao railway line and captured a small town. A small force of Manchukuoans was sent to reclaim the area and forced the Mongolians to retreat.
- Third Feng Zhanghai Subjugation (September 1932): A force of 7,000 men of the Jilin Guard Army attacked 10,000 bandits who were retreating from their earlier defeat in July. They were attempting to cross the border out of Manchukuo into the Chinese province of Rehe. Although they were surrounded, the majority of the bandits were able to escape.
- Su Bingwei Subjugation ("Mazhouli Incident") (September–December 1932): A unit that had pledged loyalty to Manchukuo under Su Bingwen revolted against the Japanese. A force of 4,500 men took part in putting down the revolt and succeeded after heavy fighting, forcing Sun Bingwen to retreat into Soviet territory. Originally, the Manchu royal and soldier Yoshiko Kawashima wanted to negotiate with him, but the plans were cancelled. Japanese propaganda nonetheless published exaggerated tales of their exploits during the revolt.
- Second Dongbiandao Subjugation (October 1932): The Fengtian Guard Army cleared a district of guerrillas, killing 270 men and taking another 1,000 prisoner. About 8,000 Manchukuoan troops acted as support for a much smaller Japanese force.
- Li Haijing Subjugation (October 1932): A group of 3,000 insurgents attempted to attack the south Heilongjiang province before a joint Manchukuoan-Japanese force launched a counterattack. It then retreated into the Rehe province.
- Ki Feng-Lung District Subjugation (November 1932): An operation to clear the Ki Feng-Lung district of insurgents, involving about 5,000 Manchukuoan troops.
- Third Dongbiandao Subjugation (November–December 1932): An operation launched to eliminate the remnants of the bandit groups that remained after the second subjugation campaign. It involved about 5,000 Manchukuoan soldiers. The operation was a success and resulted in the capture of 1,800 bandits, some of whom may have been recruited into the Imperial Army.
- Jilin Province Subjugation (October–November 1933): A large-scale operation that occurred in the Jilin province, attempting to free the entire region from insurgents and involving 35,000 Manchukuoan troops. It involved the whole of the Jilin Guard Army as well as units from several other formations. It was successful and led to the deaths of a number of prominent anti-Japanese leaders.

=== Defense of the border ===
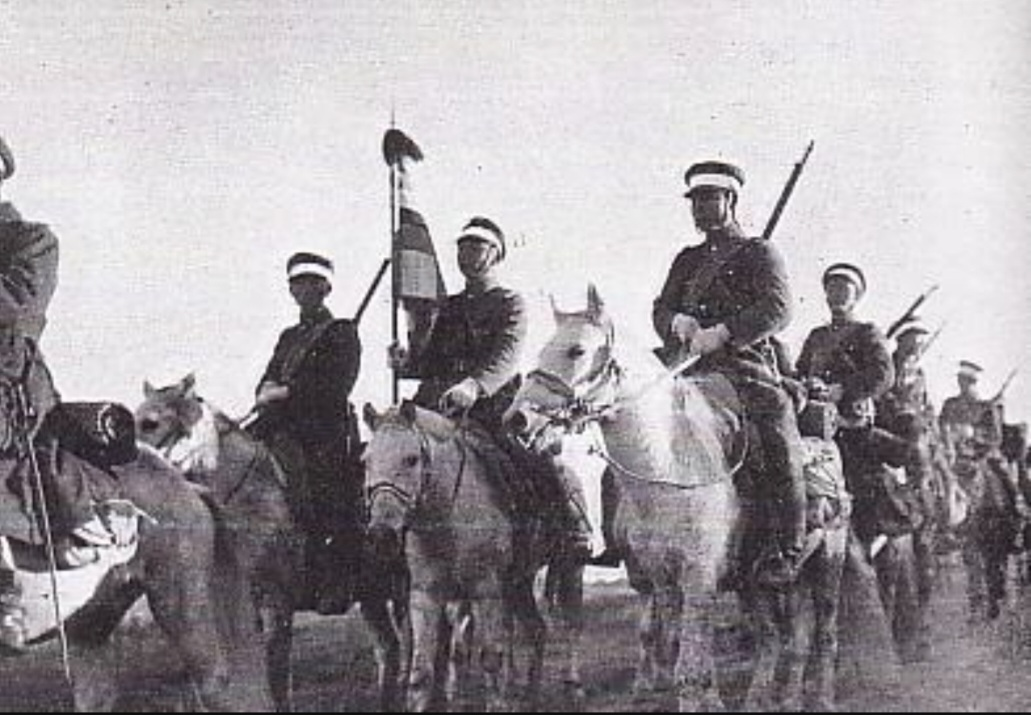
Manchukuo Imperial Army cavalry

When the Nationalist government refused for the Great Wall of China to become the new border between Manchukuo and China, the Japanese Kwantung Army launched an invasion of the Rehe province. Supporting this force were several units of the Manchukuo Imperial Army, which totaled about 42,000 men, under the command of General Zhang Haipeng. The fighting lasted just over a month, from 23 February to 28 March 1933. Western news reports wrote that some Manchukuoan units fought fairly well, with one detachment capturing 5,000 Chinese troops.

When the Second Sino–Japanese War broke out in July 1937, Nationalist Army units attacked Manchukuo, and in response the Imperial Army was partially mobilized. Several units were deployed along the border. Some clashes took place with Nationalist troops throughout August, and in most cases the Manchukuoans ended up being defeated. The arrival of a Japanese Colonel Misaki who took command of the Manchukuoan units improved the situation somewhat. Their performance improved during the campaign, but they took considerable losses nonetheless. The Imperial Army lost 60 killed and 143 missing in action.

The Manchukuoan Imperial Army saw some action against the Soviet Union during the Soviet–Japanese border conflicts, which played out largely in the Manchuria region. When the Battle of Lake Khasan occurred in the summer of 1938, Manchukuoan units were mainly used as reserves and saw little fighting, and reportedly some regiments mutinied during the battle. In May 1939, skirmishes broke out between the Mongolian cavalry (Mongolia was an ally of the Soviet Union) and Manchukuoan troops. The battle escalated as both sides brought in reinforcements and after four months of fighting the Battle of Khalkhin Gol ended up being a defeat for the Japanese and Manchukuo. About 18,000 Manchukuoans took part in the battle, mainly cavalrymen of the 7th and 8th Cavalry Regiments. They were initially held in reserve and were sent to the front line in July shortly after being reinforced to divisional strength. These units were positioned on the left flank of the Kwantung Army as it advanced towards the Khalkhin Gol river. The 1st Cavalry Regiment was then sent into battle in the northern sector in August as the situation deteriorated for the Japanese. Although the Manchukuoan units did not perform well overall, the Kwantung Army relied on them due to its desperation for manpower. After the conflict, the Japanese believed that the Manchukuo Imperial Army performed decently and saw reason to expand it.

=== Final years and defeat ===
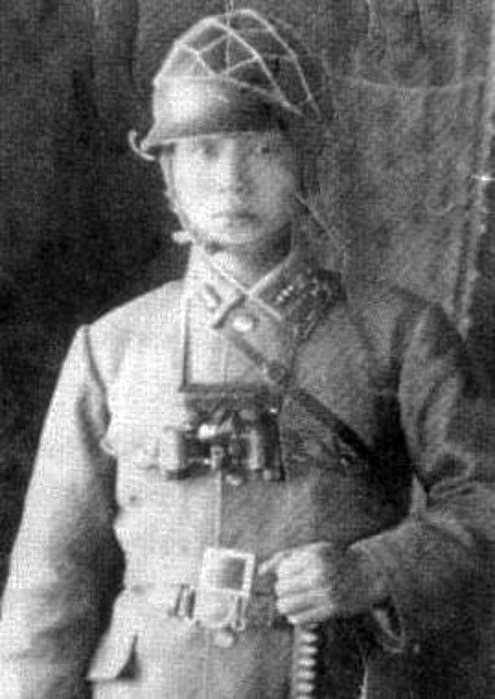
Park Chung-hee as a regimental aide in the Manchukuo Imperial Army

During the period from 1940 to 1945, the Manchukuo Imperial Army mostly saw action against Chinese Communist guerrillas. News reports at the time also continued to talk of the army's successful operations against bandits and posted recruiting announcements, being the only available public information about the army. Most of the fighting was undertaken by elite units while the majority of the army was still considered to be too unreliable by the Japanese. The average Manchukuoan units were used for basic security and guard duties. Some attempts were taken to improve the army, however, and it did receive heavier artillery and armor from Japan. When the Soviets renounced their non-aggression pact with Japan, preparations began for the coming invasion of Manchukuo. Although the Kangde Emperor's army was reasonably well-trained and decently-armed by 1945 it was still no match for the much larger and more experienced Red Army. Its armored corps, consisting of some elderly tankettes and armored cars, did not compare to the much larger Soviet tank forces. The main strength of the Manchukuoan army by that time was its cavalry and that branch did see much fighting during the invasion.

The Soviet invasion force taking part in the Manchurian Strategic Offensive Operation entered the state on 8 August 1945, consisting of 76 battle-hardened divisions from the European front, and including 4,500 tanks. The massive force easily swept aside both the depleted Kwantung Army and its Manchukuoan allies. In the early days of the assault small units of Manchukuoan cavalry saw action against the Red Army. When the Soviets reached Hailar they quickly forced the Japanese and Manchukuoan garrison in the city to surrender. The city of Fuchin fell on 11 August despite Manchukuoan and Japanese resistance, forcing them to abandon the city and retreat to the south and east. Other units in the region continued to fight until 13 August. The Manchukuoan 7th Infantry Brigade surrendered the city of Jiamusi on 16 August. Manchukuoan cavalry on the right flank of the front engaged the Soviets and Mongolian troops in Inner Mongolia. On 14 August, this force defeated a small Manchukuoan cavalry unit on the way towards its objectives of Kalgan and Dolonnor.

As the Soviets advanced, mutinies broke out in the capital of Xinjing and lasted from 13 to 19 August. Some Manchukuoan units rose up and killed their Japanese officers in revenge for the years of brutal treatment. A few Manchukuoan regulars and auxiliaries remained loyal and continued to fight on alongside the Japanese but they were the minority. Most of the Manchukuoan units melted away into the countryside after the first week or so unless they were stopped by their Japanese advisers. During the conflict, the Soviets captured 30,700 non-Japanese soldiers and killed about 10,000. Among those were 16,100 Chinese, 3,600 Mongolians, 700 Manchus and 10,300 Koreans. It is presumed that most of the Koreans were Kwantung Army auxiliaries while the rest were soldiers of the Manchukuoan Army (although some Koreans did serve in the Manchukuoan forces, such as former Chief of General Staff of the South Korean Army Paik Sun-yup and President of South Korea Park Chung-hee). Among those troops were also some White Russians. However, the majority of the former Manchukuoan Imperial Army remained in the countryside. Many of them joined the Communists since the Nationalists murdered those former Manchukuoan troops that they ran into, and as a result these former puppet troops provided an important source of manpower for the Communist Party in the region. Perhaps more importantly they also brought with them large amounts of weapons and equipment.

== Weapons and equipment ==
=== Uniforms ===
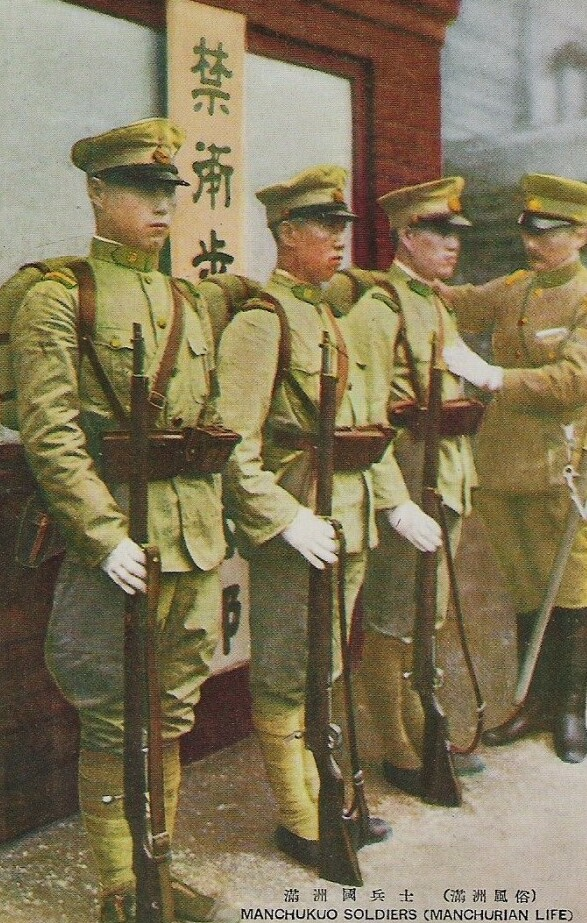
Soldiers of the Manchukuo Imperial Army

The Manchukuo Imperial Army's first military uniforms were indistinguishable from those of the local resistance groups forces and bandits, with Zhang Xueliang's former soldiers just continuing to wear Nationalist uniforms with yellow armbands to distinguish them. The problem was that it allowed soldiers on both sides to change their armbands, adding to the confusion. This issue was rectified by 1934, with new uniforms in a style similar to that of the Imperial Japanese Army, and using a color-code system on the collar badges (black for military police, red for infantry, green for cavalry, yellow for artillery, brown for engineer and blue for transport). The replacing of their old uniforms took place in the mid-1930s, and those who were stationed in the capital and big cities received new uniforms before those in the outlying towns. During the decade the Japanese-style uniform was gradually replaced with a unique Manchukuoan one.

=== Small arms ===
The early Manchukuo Imperial Army inherited a hodgepodge of weapons from the former Kuomintang arsenals of the Young Marshal, which created tremendous problems with maintenance and supply. For example, there were 26 kinds of rifles and over 20 kinds of pistols in use in 1932. In 1933, the number of guns in service was 77,268 rifles, 441 light machine guns and 329 heavy machine guns. A priority was made to unify weaponry around the 6.5×50mmSR Arisaka Type 38 rifle as a standard, along with the Type 3 heavy machine gun and Type 11 light machine gun in the same caliber.

The conversion began in 1935, when 50,000 Type 38 Carbines were imported from Japan. Over the next two or three years, Japanese rifles and machine guns were gradually issued to infantry to replace the previous mix of Chinese models. By the start of the Pacific War, the process was just about complete and the weaponry of the Manchukuo Imperial Army was the almost same as the basic Japanese Army. Rear-line defense units and militias were however given captured Chinese and out-dated Japanese rifles.

Military arsenals at Fengtian and Mukden were enlarged to produce rifles, machine guns and artillery, as well as repair them. Ammunition and small arms were also ordered from the private factories in Manchukuo.

=== Artillery ===
A Type 41 mountain gun during a training exercise, 1943

As with the small arms, the heavier equipment also initially came from Chinese sources. Due to the shortage of field artillery in the Nationalist Army the majority of the weapons confiscated from Zhang Xueliang's forces were light infantry and mountain guns. The most common among those were German and Austro-Hungarian mountain guns. By 1933 the number of artillery pieces being used was 281 infantry guns, 88 mountain guns and 70 field guns. The Japanese also issued their own artillery to the Manchukuoan army in an attempt to standardize its equipment. Many anti-aircraft guns were also used because of the potential threat of a Soviet invasion.

- Type 38 75 mm Field Gun
- Type 41 75 mm Mountain Gun
- Krupp mountain guns
- Chinese 7 cm-caliber mortars
- Chinese 75 mm field guns
- Hand Grenade (stick type)
- Type 10 Grenade Discharger
- Type 88 75 mm AA gun

=== Armored vehicles ===
The Manchukuoan Imperial Army possessed a small and mostly underdeveloped armored force. Their tanks included 8 Renault NC-27 light tanks, 20 Carden-Loyd Mk VI tankettes, and possibly a handful of Renault FT light tanks left over from the Young Marshal's arsenals. The army received no tanks from the Japanese until the 1940s, when the IJA "loaned" a company of 10 obsolete Type 94 tankettes.

They also fielded a varied of armored cars, among them some British and French models, along with 30 Japanese Type 92 Heavy Armoured Cars. The latter were mostly used by the armored branch of the military academy. Some armored cars were used mainly to transport troops during anti-bandit operations and performed well in that role.

== Organization ==
There were two standard structures for a mixed brigade of the Manchukuoan Army. The first consisted of a headquarters, two infantry regiments, one cavalry regiment, and one artillery company for a total of 2,414 men and 817 horses. The second consisted of a headquarters, one infantry regiment, one cavalry regiment, and one artillery company, totaling 1,515 men and 700 horses. Cavalry brigades likewise had two standard structures. The first was composed of a headquarters, three cavalry regiments, and an artillery company, for a total of 1,500 men and 1,500 horses. The second had a headquarters, two cavalry regiments, and an artillery company, for a total of 1,075 men and 1,075 horses. The standard structure of an infantry regiment included a headquarters, two infantry battalions, two machine gun companies, and two artillery companies, totaling 899 men and 117 horses. A cavalry regiment had a structure that consisted of a headquarters, three cavalry companies, and one machine gun company, for a total of 458 men and 484 horses. A training unit had a headquarters, teaching section, an infantry regiment, a cavalry regiment, an artillery regiment, and a cadet regiment, totaling 1,614 men and 717 horses. Those were their standard structures on paper, and given the disparity in the sizes of different units it is likely that those structures were not adhered to completely, if at all.

A military adviser department existed under the Manchukuo War Ministry which assigned Japanese advisers to every Imperial Army garrison and district army. Due to the large number of former Nationalist officers in the Manchukuoan forces, they frequently came into conflict with their Japanese advisers. Eventually the Japanese officers were able to gain considerable control over Manchukuoan units.

=== Ranks ===
Manchukuoan troops wore collar tabs that showed their rank. The system they used initially was the same as that of the Imperial Japanese Army, before the color on the tabs was changed to maroon in 1937.

=== Order of battle ===
1932

The early Manchukuo Imperial Army organization is listed below. Unit troop strengths are in parentheses. The total strength of the Manchukuo Imperial Army at its foundation was 111,044 men, as many of the former Nationalist troops that had surrendered were deemed to be too unreliable by the Japanese were demobilized.

- Fengtian Guard Army (20,541 men)
  - Headquarters (678)
  - Teaching unit (2,718)
  - 1st Mixed Brigade (2,467)
  - 2nd Mixed Brigade (2,104)
  - 3rd Mixed Brigade (2,467)
  - 4th Mixed Brigade (1,755)
  - 5th Mixed Brigade (1,291)
  - 6th Mixed Brigade (2,238)
  - 7th Mixed Brigade (2,014)
  - 1st Cavalry Brigade (1,098)
  - 2nd Cavalry Brigade (1,625)
- Jilin Guard Army (34,287 men)
  - Headquarters (1,447)
  - 2nd Teaching Unit (2,718)
  - Infantry Detachment (1,163)
  - Cavalry Detachment (1,295)
  - 1st Infantry Brigade (2,301)
  - 2nd Infantry Brigade (2,343)
  - 3rd Infantry Brigade (2,496)
  - 4th Infantry Brigade (3,548)
  - 5th Infantry Brigade (3,244)
  - 7th Infantry Brigade (2,343)
  - 8th Infantry Brigade (2,301)
  - 1st Cavalry Brigade (1,867)
  - 2nd Cavalry Brigade (1,598)
  - 3rd Cavalry Brigade (1,598)
  - 4th Cavalry Brigade (2,037)
  - Yilan Unit (706)
  - North Manchuria Railway Guard Force (151)
  - Sanrin Unit (1,452)
- River Defense Fleet (640 men)
- Heilongjiang Guard Army (25,162 men)
  - Headquarters (1,016)
  - 3rd Teaching Unit (2,718)
  - 1st Mixed Brigade (3,085)
  - 2nd Mixed Brigade (3,085)
  - 3rd Mixed Brigade (3,085)
  - 4th Mixed Brigade (3,085)
  - 5th Mixed Brigade (1,934)
  - 1st Cavalry Brigade (2,244)
  - 2nd Cavalry Brigade (2,244)
  - 3rd Cavalry Brigade (2,666)
  - East Daxing'anling Guard Army (1,818)
  - North Daxing'anling Guard Army (874)
  - South Daxing'anling Guard Army (1,682)
- Rehe Guard Army (17,945)
  - Headquarters (301)
  - Artillery Unit (854)
  - Cavalry Unit (172)
  - Infantry Unit (1,294)
  - Chengde Area Forces (4,783)
  - Chifeng Area Forces (3,414)
  - Chaoyang Area Forces (3,977)
  - Weichang Area forces (3,760)
  - Seian Army (2,018)

1934

In August 1934 the Manchukuo Imperial Army was reorganized into five district armies, each divided into two or three zones. Each zone had one or two Mixed Brigades assigned to it, as well as a training unit. The total strength of the Manchukuo Imperial Army at this time was 72,329 men. The new organization was:

- 1st District Army "Fengtian" - General Yu Zhishan (12,321 men)
  - 6 Mixed Brigades
- 2nd District Army "Jilin" - General Ji Xing (13,185 men)
  - 4 Mixed Brigades, 3 Cavalry Brigades
- 3rd District Army "Qiqihar" - General Zhang Wendao (13,938 men)
  - 5 Mixed Brigades, 1 Cavalry Brigade
- 4th District Army "Harbin" - General Yu Zhengshen (17,827 men)
  - 8 Mixed Brigades, 1 Cavalry Brigade
- 5th District Army "Chengde" - General Zhang Haipeng (9,294 men)
  - 3 Mixed Brigades, 1 Cavalry Brigade
- Independent units:
  - East Hingganling Guard Army
  - West Hingganling Guard Army
  - North Hingganling Guard Army
  - South Hingganling Guard Army
  - Seian Guard Army
  - 1st Xingjing Cavalry Brigade
  - River Fleet

1940s

By the 1940s the manpower of the Manchukuo Imperial Army had increased to over 200,000 men according to Soviet intelligence sources. They reported the army had the following units:

- 1st Division (3 infantry regiments, 1 artillery regiment)
- 1st Guards Brigade (2 infantry regiments of 2 battalions, 1 mortar company)
- 1st Cavalry Division (2 cavalry brigades, 1 battalion of horse artillery)
- 10 Infantry Brigades (2 infantry regiments of 2 battalions, 1 mortar company)
- 6 Cavalry Brigades (2 cavalry regiments, 1 battery of horse artillery)
- 21 Mixed Brigades (1 infantry regiment, 1 cavalry regiment, 1 battery mountain artillery)
- 2 Independent Brigades
- 7 Independent Cavalry Regiments
- 11 Artillery Units (one per District)
- 5 Anti Aircraft Regiments

1945

Sources differ on how many troops the Imperial Army fielded in 1945, ranging from 170,000 to 220,000. Its organization on the eve of the Manchurian Strategic Offensive Operation was as follows:

- 8 infantry divisions
- 7 cavalry divisions
- 14 infantry and cavalry brigades

== Special units ==
=== Manchukuo Imperial Guard ===
When Puyi first became the head of state of Manchukuo in 1932 with the title of "Chief Executive", several units were formed to defend him and the capital of Xijing. Those included the Manchukuo Imperial Guards, charged with his personal protection as well as to serve as an honor guard on ceremonial occasions. The other was the Independent Cavalry Corps, formally the 4th Cavalry Brigade, which had taken part in the invasion of Rehe in March 1933. A special guard corps was also created in the Fengtian province, and eventually every province raised one. It performed well in combat. One of the more well-known irregular forces of the Imperial Army was an anti-bandit force of about 5,000 under the command of Yoshiko Kawashima, a Manchu royal and relative of Puyi.

=== Mongolian Independence Army ===
In the early 1930s the Japanese formed a "Mongolian Independence Army" out of ethnic Mongols living in Manchukuo. The early source of recruits were mostly bandits and other undesirables, with Japanese advisers having total control over the new force. The early army had about 6,000 men in total divided into three armies of 2,000 men each. The army, once established, became part of the regular Manchukuoan Army as mainly a cavalry force. It later consisted of nine cavalry regiments and waged its own war against bandits independently of the Manchukuoans with some success, also taking part in the 1933 invasion of Rehe. In 1938 it was expanded to a size of twelve cavalry regiments, two artillery regiments, two independent mountain batteries and a motorized transport unit. Two years later it was completely integrated into the Manchukuoan army and dissolved, though Mongolian units continued to perform well in operations.

=== Korean Detachment ===
A special Korean detachment was formed in 1937 out of ethnic Koreans by a local businessman who was of Korean descent. The Japanese liked the idea as they believed Koreans had no loyalty to the Chinese and would be more dependable. All posts were filled in December 1938 and the first class of recruits arrived at a training center in 1939. It was initially small and consisted a headquarters, and infantry company and mortar battery, later being expanded with the addition of a second infantry company in 1940. The unit saw heavy action against Communist guerrillas and bandits, being regarded by the Japanese as a ruthless and effective unit. The detachment came to be known for its brutality and was one of the few puppet units that earned the respect of its Japanese superiors due to its martial spirit.

Many Koreans were graduates of the Manchukuo Army's Fengtian Military School, starting with its fourth class, where they trained alongside other "Manchurian" (Chinese) cadets, while a separate class existed for Japanese cadets of the Kwantung Army. The class of 1937 in particular would become notable for producing many of South Korea's future general officers, and included among its ranks a future Prime Minister, a Chairman of the Joint Chiefs of Staff, a Chief of Staff of the Army, and two Marine Corps Commandants.

=== Asano Brigade ===
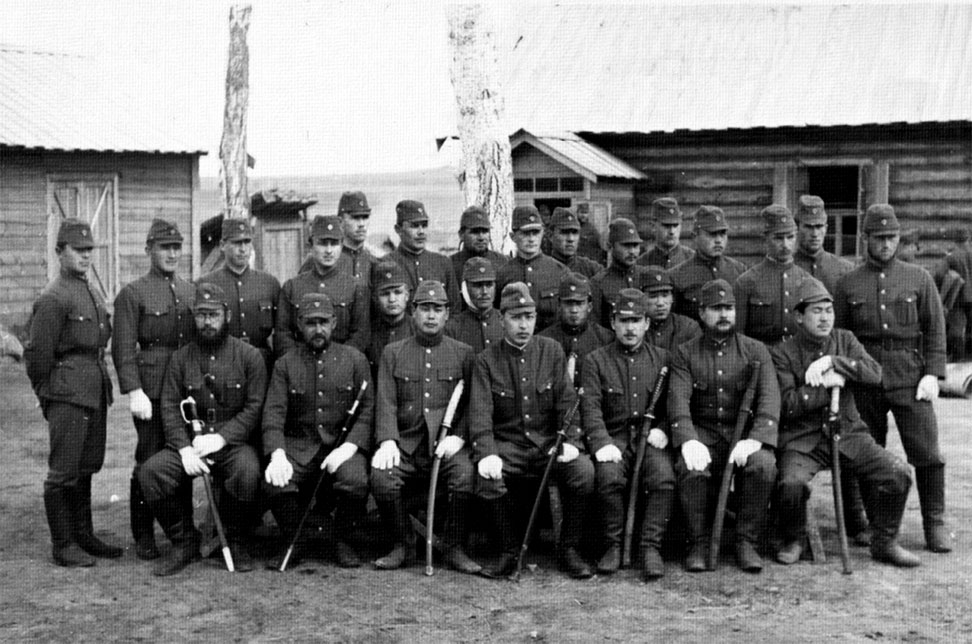
Russian and Japanese members of the Asano Brigade

Following the Russian Civil War, many White Russians ended up in Manchuria, and the Japanese decided to use this motivated anti-Soviet force. Conscription into the Manchukuo Army started in early 1940 and applied to all ethnicities, including Russians. They were initially used to guard railways and other important areas and the early success of the unit in these simple tasks caused it to be expanded. However, the Japanese kept the White Russian troops under their direct command. They worked with the Russian Fascist Party of Konstantin Rodzaevsky to form this unit, and although there was one White Russian revolt in 1933, the Japanese considered them useful enough to keep employing them. In 1936 they were all unified into one detachment, the Asano Detachment or Asano Brigade, named after Colonel Asano Takashi, the Japanese adviser who organized it. The brigade was officially part of the Manchukuo army but it was led by Japanese officers. It grew from an initial strength of 200 men to 700 men divided into five companies. The brigade fought during the Battle of Khalkhin Gol in 1938 and was almost totally destroyed. Another one was raised to replace it and it numbered some 4,000 men, including Cossacks, by 1945. During the Soviet invasion of Manchuria, it took part in fighting against the Red Army and the fate of those who fell into Soviet captivity is unknown. There were also reports of some of the White Russian units surrendering to the Red Army as they advanced.

The White Russian emigres who joined the unit were required to learn Japanese and instructed in that language, while living by Bushido principles. When conscription began in 1940 the unit's numbers were increased, the presence of Russian officers trained by the Japanese allowed them to be integrated more quickly. As of 1941 the detachment consisted of three cavalry squadrons. In 1942 a separate military school was established to train Russian officers for the Asano detachment. Service in the Manchukuo Army was seen as unpopular among emigre circles in Harbin. In January 1944, the Asano Brigade was reorganized into three separate detachments. These new units had a higher proportion of Russian officers instead of Japanese officers than the older brigade. The symbols used by the brigade included both Russian national symbols as well as the five-pointed star of the Manchukuo Army.

=== Buryat soldiers ===
The Manchukuo Army also included ethnic Buryat troops among its ranks. Like the White Russians, many Buryats had fled their homeland in the aftermath of the Russian Civil War as well as during the political purges in the Soviet Union and Outer Mongolia during the 1930s, in which many Buryats were targeted. A leading figure in the Manchukuo Buryat community was Urzhin Garmaev. Buryats between ages 20-30 were mobilized alongside other Mongols into the Hingan North Garrison Army, with two cavalry corps and a special railroad defense squadron under Urjin's command. Their duties included border patrol near Soviet and Outer Mongolian territory, and suppression of communist anti-Japanese guerillas. Buryat soldiers also participated on the Manchukuo side during the Battle of Khalkhin Gol, after which the survivors were withdrawn to Hailar.

== See also ==
- Manchukuo Imperial Navy
- Manchukuo Imperial Air Force
- Collaborationist Chinese Army

== Sources ==
=== References ===
- Phyllis, Birnbaum (2015). Manchu Princess, Japanese Spy: The Story of Kawashima Yoshiko, the Cross-Dressing Spy Who Commanded Her Own Army. Columbia University Press. ISBN 978-0231152181.
- Douglas, Holland (2008). The State of Sovereignty: Territories, Laws, Populations. Indiana University Press. ISBN 978-0253220165.
- Glantz, David (2003). The Soviet Strategic Offensive in Manchuria, 1945: August Storm. Routledge. ISBN 978-0415408615.
- Harmsen, Peter (2018). Storm Clouds over the Pacific, 1931–1941 (War in the East). Casemate. ISBN 978-1612004808.
- Jowett, Philip (2004). Rays of the Rising Sun, Volume 1: Japan's Asian Allies 1931–45, China and Manchukuo. Helion and Company Ltd. ISBN 978-1-874622-21-5.
- Oberlander, Erwin (1966), The All-Russian Fascist Party (Journal of Contemporary History), Sage Publications, Ltd.
- Paik, Sun Yup (1992), From Pusan to Panmunjom, Riverside, NJ: Brassey Inc., ISBN 978-0-02-881002-7
- Smirnov, Sergei (2015). "The Russian Officer Corps of the Manchukuo Army". The Journal of Slavic Military Studies. 28 (3).
