= Siberian natural resources =

Natural resources located in the Russian region of Siberia

Siberian natural resources refers to resources found inside Siberia in North Asia. The Russian Siberian region is rich in resources, including coal, oil and metal ores.

== Contribution to Soviet economy ==
Siberia’s contribution to the Soviet economy in percent of national output was given in Soviet statistical yearbooks for 1973 (1940 in brackets) as: Coal 33% (23%), Coking coal 30% (17%), Oil 21% (1.6%), Natural gas 8.5% (from 1.5% in 1950), Electric power output 18% (6.6%), Iron ore 6.9% (1.6%), Pig iron 9.5% (10%), Crude steel 8.3% (10%), Rolled steel 10% (9.1%). But regional breakdowns were omitted in the yearbooks from 1973, except for a few 1975 figures.

== Energy sources ==
=== Coal ===
In the important Chelyabinsk coalfields, production rose from 390,000 tonnes in 1925 to 3,519,000 tonnes in 1936. The total production for the East Urals was 8,080,000 tonnes in 1937. Reserves for the following coalfields are shown in millions of tonnes:

- East Urals: (Triassic lignite): 2,872
- Karaganda (Low Carboniferous period, for coking): 52,696
- Kuznets (Permian, for coking): 450,658
- Minusinsk (Permian): 20,612
- Chulym-Yenisei: (Jurassic lignite): 43,000
- Kansk: (Jurassic lignite): 42,000
- Irkutsk and Transbaikalia (Jurassic): 81,397
- Bureya: 26,116
- Suchan (for coking): 42,000
- Tunguska (low Carboniferous): 400,000
- Lena (Mesozoic): 60,000

==== Kuznetsk Coal Zone ====
The development of the coal fields of Kuznetsk Basin, (sometimes called the "Kuzbass") transformed the Siberian steppe. The south sector of the Trans-Siberian Railway became a great industrial center because of the activity surrounding the coalfields. These ancient reserves of 13,000,000,000 tonnes grew to 450,658,000,000 tonnes. In 1937, the 50 mines in this area produced a total of 17,300,000 tonnes. The coal production of this zone was comparable with that of all of British India, and half of that produced by Japan. Kuznetsk coal was the best in the USSR, with high energy and low sulphur content. The total anthracite reserve was 54 million tonnes; and was used in the Ural-Kuznetsk Metallurgical Combine. Siberia is also the coldest winters to survive, this includes freezing temperature such as -50 degrees.

Years	Millions of Tonnes	Percentage
1913	0.799	3%
1928	2.743	8%
1932	7.544	12%
1934	11.974	13%
1936	17.3	14%
1937	20.0	?

==== Other coal deposits ====
Another important reserve is at Karaganda near the Magnitogorsk (Magnet City) Higt Ovens. Production in 1937 was 3,937,200 tonnes. Other important coal deposits are: Minusinsk near Chernogorsk, which joins the mining zone of Chulym-Yenisei at the Yenisei river; the Kansk deposits north of Krasnoyarsk; the Irkutsk deposits, which yielded 3,000,000 tonnes from the Cheremkovo mine in 1937; the Lake Baikal deposits; the Lena sector; the Norilsk sector in Tunguska mining zone; the Sangar Khai founts in the Amur River and Bureya Rivers near Vladivostok, the Artem and Suchan mines with 1937 production of 2,110,000 tonnes and 590,000 tonnes respectively; and the Sakhalin coal deposits in the Pamir and Tian Shan mountains in central Asia.

In the Minusinsk area, the estimated reserves are 20,612,000,000 tonnes; the Chulym-Yenisei mine is estimated at 43,000,000,000 tonnes; the Kansk sources estimated at 42,000,000,000 tonnes; and Cheremkhovo estimated at 79,000,000,000 tonnes. The Kuznets area has excellent coal for coke, chemical and gas production. Production in 1913 was 774,000 tonnes. In 1927, these mines extracted about 2,600,000 tonnes to maintain one extraction of 16,800,000 tonnes. The modernized Prokopyevsk mine has an expected production capacity of about 3,200,000 tonnes. The other sources are in Stalinsk (Kuznets), Lenin-Kuznets, Kemerovo, Anzhero-Sudzhensk, Chernogorsk, and Cheremkhovo

In Siberia, a huge amount of Palaeozoic coal was set on fire and destroyed at the end of the Permian period when the Siberian Traps flood basalt erupted through coalfield areas. This caused deposition of much fly ash in sediments across the world. See Fly ash#In the geologic record.

=== Petroleum ===
The Siberian petroleum sources follow (in tonnes - 1 tonne of petroleum is equivalent to 5 or 10 barrels, or 42 gallons, depending on the density)

- Emba: 1,190,400,000
- Perm-Kama: 3,540,000,000
- Other Zones at West Urals and Volga: 471,500,000
- Sakhalin: 339,800,000
- Central Asia: 427,100,000

Table of Total production (for 45 oil well areas)

- 1901: 11,000,000
- 1913: 7,627,000
- 1920: 2,915,000
- 1928: 11,625,400
- 1932: 21,413,200
- 1936: 27,337,700

The most important Siberian petroleum zones are the West Siberian petroleum basin, Central Urals, Sakhalin Island, Nordvyl on the Arctic Siberian coast, and the Kamchatka peninsula. From the Caspian Sea there is one oil pipeline, which continues to the petrol camps of Emba at Orsk and ends in Omsk, in western Siberia. Sakhalin Island has the most important oil reserves in the Russian Far East. In 1936, the Ohka oil wells extracted about 470,000 tonnes; one-third were obtained for Japanese concessionaires. In the Emba River area about 466,000 tonnes were extracted from about 20 pits of a total of 300 yaciments in 1937.

Total USSR oil production was 230,700,000 tonnes and there exist other reserves of 652,000,000 tonnes.

=== Electrical power generation ===
The third source of energy is hydro electricity. The region boasts large rivers capable of accommodating in-river hydro plants of 1000 MW and more per project. This potential was realised at an early stage, leading to investigations into the hydro potential of Pamir Tien-Shan and other East Siberian hydro resources. Today these hydro systems contribute roughly 40% of the electricity produced in Russia's Second Electricity Zone (Siberia) and helps to explain why the wholesale electricity prices in Zone 2 are structurally cheaper than in Zone 1 (European Russia).

In 2011, Russia's electricity consumption totalled 1022 TWh, of which Hydropower contributed 63TWh. These energy producing and disposes in 50% of time raised in about 280.690 gigawatts (GW), between of theirs based in one disposition of 95% stay 58 GW.

To increase output, studies were made of the Lena, Yenisei and Ob river systems. In the Lenin Program in 1920, proposed construction of power systems in the Urals, Yenisei, Angara River and Lake Baikal. Some of these projects are similar to the Grand Coulee Dam in the Columbia River.

A major hydroelectric powerplant was constructed in 1932 on the Dnieper River at a high latitude in Zaporizhzhia. However, it was destroyed in 1941 by retreating Soviet forces during World War II. The plant had a production capacity of 900 MW, was about 2,500 feet long, and rose 125 feet above water level. In 1940, the total production capacity was 2.5 GW. The new plan proposed plants on a gigantic scale on the Angara River. The planned output was 9 GW, with four other plants in high Yenisei producing about 4 GW more.

== Iron deposits ==
Siberian iron sources were more assorted. They are at Magnitogorsk, Nizhni Tagil deposits in the south of Kuznetsk, the Angara River reserves, and Russian Far East mines.

The mines of the Urals have been known since 1702: Magnitogorsk with annual extraction of 6,000,000 tonnes in 1931, minerals being magnetite and secondarily martite, with 55% or 66% of iron content. The other and oldest center was in Ninshi-Tagil. The total Ural iron reserves were 1,390,670,000 tonnes, of which one-third are limonite and about 450,000,000 correspond directly at Magnitogorsk. When the deposits in Kuznets began to be exploited, in 1930 recent discovered the Mountainous Shoria iron deposits, with reserves calculated as 292,412,000 tonnes, 45% iron content, and the Karaganda deposits. The other important founts stay in Petrovsk-Zabaikal near Baikal Lake, and the Little Khingan Mountains in the Soviet side of the frontier.

Other iron resources in East Siberia are the Angara and Ilim river areas northwest of Baikal Lake, with production of 420,850,000 tonnes. No less than 30% of USSR iron production in the USSR was obtained in the Kuznets zone in 1937.

Iron deposits:

- Urals: sources of these mineral exist in Nizhni-Tagil, Zlatoust and Magnitogorsk, with a total production of 2,600,000 tonnes in 1937.
- Gornaya Shoria: exist iron, in Magnetite form, inside of Calize mineral why poses one 45% of iron content, but more Sulphur.
- Ridder: if extracted iron mixed with lead and zinc. Your total production in 1936 are about 1,000 tonnes. At the same time in the same mine extracted gold, copper and tin.

== Other minerals and general observations ==
- Manganese: mined in the Urals, Kazakhstan and west of Krasnoyarsk. Their extractions effectuated in Achinsk Mine with one mineral with 20 or 25% of purity. The total production in 1937 was about 100,000 tonnes.
- Copper: possess ample reserves in Urals and Kazakhstan. Its total production in 1930 was 34,105 tonnes, increasing in 1936 to 83,000 tonnes. In East Kazakhstan exist the Yaciment of Kounrad, their minerals are composed of less than 2% copper, and these extraction are uneconomic. And the mine of Djezkazgan with double production why mentioned mine above.
- Pyrite: the founts of these mineral stay in diverse sites, such as Krasnouralsk and Orsk.
- Lead and zinc: the sources stay in the Siberian areas of Ridder Mine in Altai, Transbaikalia and Primorsky Krai. The total production of lead and zinc in 1936 were 55,000 and 63,000 tonnes respectively.
- Aluminum: the sources of these material stay in North Urals, in Khabakovsk ancient, Nadezhdinsk, and south Urals in Kamensk. The USSR has a total production of aluminum in 1939 of 60,000 tonnes.
- Nickel: the most important deposits are in Norilsk, near low Yenisei. Local production was 3,000 tonnes in 1938.
- Gold: Was believed to be mined before in the Urals and in Siberia from medieval times. The estimates in 1936, mentioned about 5,173,000 oz, which then reduced later to about 4,500,000 oz. These deposits exist near the Aldan and Kolyma rivers in Yakutia and others in Central Asia and the Urals.
- Chromium: In the Urals mountains was obtained 200,000 tonnes of chromite.
- Tin and Tungsten: there exist deposits of these minerals in the East Baikal Area and Kazakhstan.
- Borax and Potash: These minerals are exploited in great quantities in Solikamsk. The local production was 1,800,000 tonnes in 1937. The total reserves of potash are estimated at 15,000 tonnes, and magnesium stay in about 18,000,000 tonnes. In Lake Inder (central Asia) there is 30,000 tonnes.
- Asbestos: This mineral was extracted in an Asbestos mine near Sverdlovsk in the Urals from 1889. The fiber is found in Peridotite, as in Quebec and Rhodesia. Other deposits exist in the Altai-Sayan region. The Ural reserves are about 17,500,000 tonnes of fiber with more than 0.7 mm in length, so adequate for internal requirements. The USSR is in second place for production of these mineral with a yield of 100,000 tonnes.
- Talc and Steatite: deposits of these minerals exist in the Urals in great quantity.
- Magnesium: Apart from the sources of borax, there are also pure magnesium deposits in Sverdlovsk and Chelyabinsk, with production of 800,000 tonnes.
- Halite (rock salt): The extractions of these element are in Solikamsk in the Urals.
- Common salt: This is recovered from the Aral Sea.
- Precious Stones and Gems: The Urals have many sources of these, including beryllium, amethyst, topaz, malachite, alejandrie, zirconium, etc. The Mir Mine in Mirny, Sakha Republic was the largest (by area) open pit diamond mine in the world till closure in 2012.
- Mercury: Important sources are in the Urals Mountains.
- Mirabilite: Sources are in the Kara-Bogaz gulf.

=== Coal ===
The existence of coal, estimated at 400,000,000,000 tonnes, was about a quarter of the Asian total, or half of the European reserves. The principal coal mining valleys and basins are:

- Kuznetsk Basin
- Irkutsk Valley
- Minusinsk Basin
- Kirghiz Steppe Valleys (Karaganda Basin)
- Sakhalin Island (Alexandrovsk Valley)
- Maritime Provinces
- Tunguska Basin
- Bureisk Valley

During the interwar years, major production was in the Kuznetsk Basin; the Carboniferous Basin of Irkutsk extends joining at Transiberian railway, in 480 km, and Primorsky Krai near the Vladivostok area.

=== Petrol ===
Northern Sakhalin island holds large quantities of petrol. The ownership of these reserves is an ongoing concern between the Japanese and Russian governments. Other sources are found off the coast of Kamchatka and Ohkostk. The rest of Siberia is not currently seen as rich in petroleum, with the exception of petrol pits in Central Asia and the Urals. These last (referring to the Turkestan zone) are an extension of the Caucasian petrol zone and the mentioned Ural petrol sources.

=== Gold ===
gold

=== Iron ===
Stay more distributed and are exploited. The most important are Telbes Mine (Kuznetsk coal basin), Minusinsk, Yenisei valley, Olga territory (Maritime Province) and the Irkutsk area.
