= Nanshin-ron =

Empire of Japan political doctrine

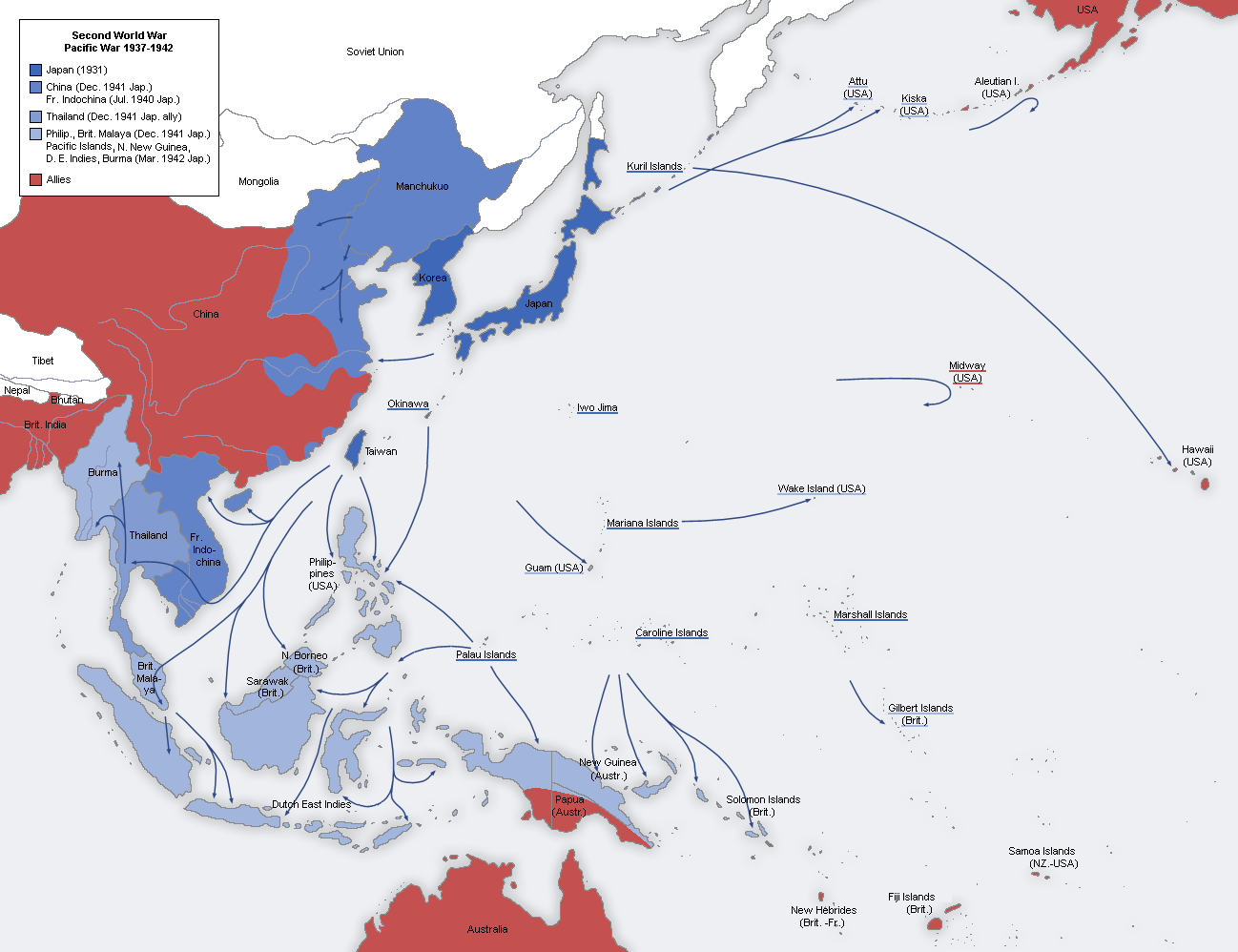
Japanese expansion in the Asia-Pacific after Kantokuen was cancelled

Nanshin-ron (Japanese: 南進論; "Southern Expansion Doctrine" or "Southern Road") was a political doctrine in the Empire of Japan that stated that Southeast Asia and the Pacific Islands were Japan's sphere of interest and that their potential value to the Empire for economic and territorial expansion was greater than elsewhere.

The opposing political doctrine was Hokushin-ron (北進論; "Northern Expansion Doctrine"), largely supported by factions of the Imperial Japanese Army (IJA), which stated the same but for Manchuria and Siberia. After military setbacks at the Battle of Khalkhin Gol in Mongolia; the start of the Second Sino-Japanese War that tied down millions of Japanese troops in China, and negative Western attitudes towards Japanese expansionist tendencies, the Southern Expansion Doctrine became predominant, especially after the Tōseiha (Control Faction) of the IJA took power after the February 26 incident. Its focus was to procure resources from European Southeast Asian colonies, eliminate supply routes to China, and neutralize the Allied military presence in the Pacific. The Army favored a "counterclockwise strike", while the Navy favored a "clockwise strike".

== Meiji era ==
In Japanese historiography, the term nanshin-ron is used to describe Japanese writings on the importance to Japan of the South Seas region in the Pacific Ocean. Japanese interest in Southeast Asia can be observed in writings of the Edo period (17th–19th centuries).

After the Meiji Restoration of 1868, the nanshin-ron policy came to be advanced with the southern regions as a focus for trade and emigration. During the early Meiji era, Japan derived economic benefits from Japanese emigrants to Southeast Asia, among which there were prostitutes (Karayuki-san) who worked in brothels in British Malaya, Singapore, the Philippines, the Dutch East Indies and French Indochina. Nanshin-ron was advocated as a national policy by a group of Japanese ideologues during the 1880s and the 1890s. Writings of the time often presented areas of Micronesia and Southeast Asia as uninhabited or uncivilised and suitable for Japanese colonisation and cultivation.

As Western colonial powers laid claim to territories ever closer to Japan, Meiji leaders sought to strengthen Japan's international position so that it could attain equal status with the West as a sovereign nation. As a result, Japan began to apply the lessons it learned from European imperialism and itself became a colonial power. In its initial stages Nanshin-ron focused primarily on Southeast Asia, and until the late 1920s, it concentrated on gradual and peaceful Japanese advances into the region to address what the Japanese saw as the twin problems of underdevelopment and Western colonialism.

Between 1894 and the early 1910s, Japan's foreign trade more than quadrupled, and its trade with Asian countries greatly increased. Japanese trading companies hugely expanded their share of Japan's foreign trade and began to export capital, mainly in the form of loans and investment in Korea and China. Communities of emigrant Japanese merchants arose in the Dutch East Indies and the South Sea Islands, selling sundry goods to local customers, and increasing Japan's imports of rubber and hemp. Large-scale Japanese investment in rubber planting and iron mining occurred in Malaya. Other resources obtained from Southeast Asia included copra and hemp from plantations in Malaya and in Mindanao in the southern Philippines. The Japanese Foreign Ministry established consulates in Manila (1888), Singapore (1889), and Batavia (1909).

== Theoretical development ==
Nanshin-ron appeared in Japanese political discourse around the mid-1880s. In the late 19th century, the policy focused on Qing China, with an emphasis on securing control of Joseon Korea and expanding Japanese interests in Fujian. Russian involvement in Manchuria at the turn of the century led to the policy being eclipsed by hokushin-ron (the "Northern Expansion Doctrine"). The resulting Russo-Japanese War (1904–05) produced territorial gains for Japan in South Manchuria. After the war, the expansionist aspects of nanshin-ron became more developed, and the policy was incorporated into the national defense strategy in 1907.

== Adoption as national policy ==
In 1931, the "Five Ministers Meeting" defined the Japanese objective of extending its influence in the Pacific but excluded areas such as the Philippines, the Dutch East Indies, and Java, which might provoke other countries. Nanshin-ron became official policy after 1935 and was officially adopted as national policy with the promulgation of the Toa shin Chitsujo (New Order in East Asia) in 1936 at the "Five Ministers Conference" (attended by the Prime Minister, Foreign Minister, Finance Minister, Army Minister and the Navy Minister), with the resolution to advance south peacefully.

== World War II ==
By the start of World War II, the policy had evolved in scope to include both the Pacific and Southeast Asia. The doctrine also formed part of the basis of the Greater East Asian Co-Prosperity Sphere, which was proclaimed by Japanese Prime Minister Konoe Fumimaro from July 1940. Furthermore, Japan was hit by economic embargoes by the Western powers after its invasion of China, and the militarists felt the need to challenge Western colonial dominance in Asia, having proclaimed "Asia for the Asians". Resource-rich areas of Southeast Asia were earmarked to provide raw materials for Japan's industry such as oil, rubber and tin, and the Pacific Ocean was to become a "Japanese lake".

During the war, Japan began to be engaged in military invasions in Southeast Asia, such as the Malayan campaign of December 1941, which were a result of an expansionist policy that had its origins in, among other factors, the country's overseas commercial ventures. Capturing British Malaya was a critical step in capturing British Singapore, which was the pivot of British defense in the Asia-Pacific region, and had served as a vital naval base that controlled the Malacca Strait. Japan would then launch the Dutch East Indies campaign of January 1942. Following the Japanese invasion of the Philippines, an unsuccessful attempt was made to switch large areas of sugar-producing land to cotton production. After the Japanese attack on Pearl Harbor, Japan went on to capture islands across the Pacific until it was halted by Allied forces at the pivotal Battle of Midway in June 1942. Failing to achieve a negotiated peace with the US, Japan heavily fortified the islands that were in strategic locations to form a defensive perimeter against US counter-invasion. The Japanese strategy failed to consider island hopping, in which US Marines would skip heavily defended islands and capture easier targets, which left the Japanese troops in the fortifications without supplies and liable to starvation and disease.

== See also ==
- Axis power negotiations on the division of Asia
- Flying geese paradigm
- German-Japanese relations
- Pan-Asianism
- Southern Expeditionary Army Group

== Bibliography ==
- Beasley, W. G. (1991). Japanese Imperialism 1894–1945. London: Oxford University Press. ISBN 978-0-19-822168-5.
- Nish, Ian (1991). Japanese Foreign Policy in the Interwar Period. Praeger Publishers. ISBN 978-0-275-94791-0.
- Howe, Christopher (1999). The Origins of Japanese Trade Supremacy: Development and Technology in Asia from 1540 to the Pacific War. University Of Chicago Press. ISBN 978-0-226-35486-6.
- Peattie, Mark (1992). Nan'Yo: The Rise and Fall of the Japanese in Micronesia, 1885–1945 (Pacific Islands Monograph Series). University of Hawaii Press. ISBN 978-0-8248-1480-9.
