= Valley of the Temples =

Valley of the Temples can refer to:

- Valley of the Temples (Sicily)
- Valley of the Temples Memorial Park, Hawaii
