= Zhang Xueliang =

Chinese general and warlord (1901–2001)

Zhang Xueliang Chang Hsueh-liang
- 張學良
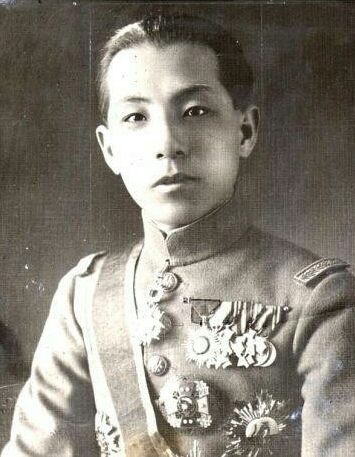
- Zhang in 1928

Warlord of Manchuria
- In office June 4, 1928 – September 18, 1931
- Preceded by: Zhang Zuolin
- Succeeded by: Office abolished

Personal details
- Born: June 3, 1901 Tai'an County, Fengtian, Qing Empire
- Died: October 15, 2001 (aged 100) Honolulu County, Hawaii, U.S.
- Resting place: Valley of the Temples Memorial Park, Honolulu County, Hawaii
- Party: Kuomintang
- Spouses: Yu Fengzhi (Note: Also known as Yu Feng-chih) (m. 1916; div. 1964); Gu Ruiyu (m. 1924; div. 1931); Zhao Yidi (Note: Also known as Edith Chao Chang) (m. 1964; died 2000)
- Children: 5
- Parent: Zhang Zuolin (father)
- Relatives: Zhang Xueming (brother)
- Awards: Order of Rank and Merit; Order of Wen-Hu; Order of Blue Sky and White Sun
- Nickname(s): Young Marshal (Chinese: 少帥; pinyin: shàoshuài)

Military service
- Allegiance: Fengtian clique (until 1928); Nationalist China (1928–1937)
- Branch/service: Northeastern Army; National Revolutionary Army
- Rank: Army general
- Commands: Northeast Peace Preservation Forces
- Battles/wars: Sino-Soviet conflict; Central Plains War; Mukden Incident; Battle of Rehe; Xi'an Incident

Zhang Xueliang
- Traditional Chinese: 張學良
- Simplified Chinese: 张学良
Transcriptions
Standard Mandarin
- Hanyu Pinyin: Zhāng Xuéliáng
- Wade–Giles: Chang^{1} Hsüeh^{2}-liang^{2}
- IPA: [ʈʂáŋ ɕɥěljǎŋ]

Zhang Xueliang (Note: Also romanized as Chang Hsueh-liang and known later in life as Peter H. L. Chang) (Chinese: 張學良; June 3, 1901 (Note: According to other accounts, 1898 or 1900) – October 15, 2001), also known by the epithet "Young Marshal" in contrast to his father "Old Marshal" Zhang Zuolin, was a Chinese general. He is best known for his role in the Xi'an Incident in 1936, in which he arrested Chiang Kai-shek and forced him to form a Second United Front with the Chinese Communist Party against the Japanese.

In 1928, following the Japanese assassination of his father, Zhang assumed command of the Northeastern Army and leadership of the Fengtian clique. A progressive sympathetic to nationalist ideas, he pledged loyalty to the Nationalist government in the Northeast Flag Replacement, bringing an end to the Warlord Era. He used his military base to wield considerable influence in the politics of the Nanjing decade. He followed a policy of nonresistance to the Japanese invasions of Manchuria in 1931 and Rehe in 1933, the latter of which prompted Wang Jingwei's call for his resignation and provoked public outrage. He stepped down after the loss of Rehe.

In 1934, Zhang was again appointed as commander of the Northeastern Army to suppress the Communists, but he became disillusioned with Chiang's policy of "stabilizing China before resisting Japan," and orchestrated the Xi'an Incident with Yang Hucheng. In its aftermath, Chiang placed Zhang under house arrest, first on the mainland and then in Taiwan, for more than five decades until 1988, refraining from executing him due to the intervention of Madam Chiang. Zhang died of pneumonia in 2001, at the age of 100 in Honolulu, Hawaii.

== Early life ==
Zhang Xueliang was born in Haicheng, Liaoning province on June 3, 1901. Zhang was educated by private tutors and, unlike his father, the warlord Zhang Zuolin, he felt at ease in the company of westerners.

Zhang graduated from Fengtian Military Academy, was made a colonel in the Fengtian Army, and appointed the commander of his father's bodyguards in 1919. In 1921 he was sent to Japan to observe military maneuvers, where he developed a special interest in aircraft. Later, he developed an air corps for the Fengtian Army, which was widely used in the battles that took place within the Great Wall during the 1920s. In 1922, he was promoted to major general and commanded an army-sized force. Two years later, he was also made commander of the air units.

Some studies suggest that he joined the CCP in 1926 and became an underground member, with Chen Qiaonian as his introducer. This conclusion was provided by Chen Kongjun(Chen Entian), an independent scholar of CCP history.

== Leader of the Northeast ==
=== Change of Flag ===
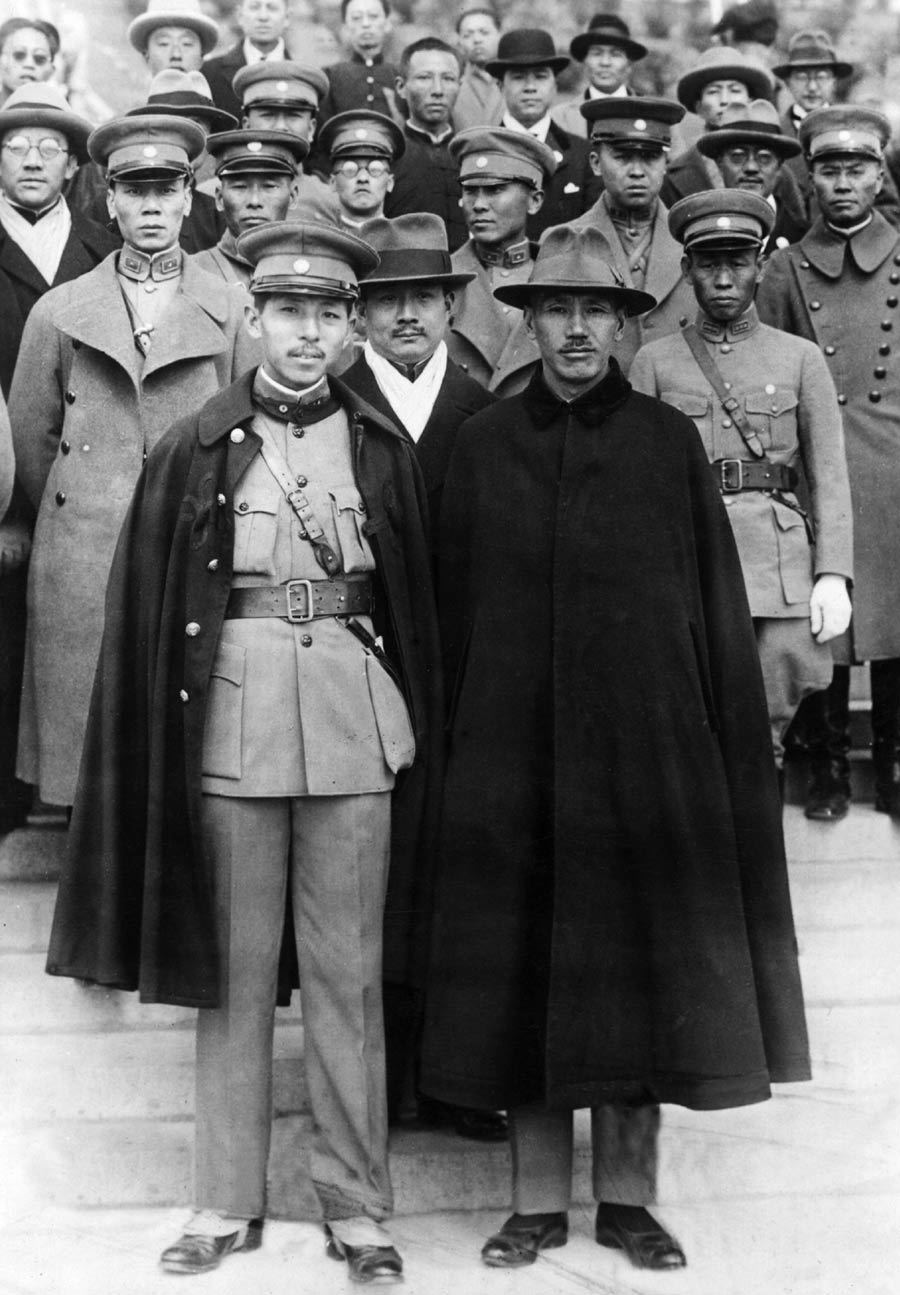
Zhang with Chiang Kai-shek in November 1930

Upon the death of his father in 1928, he succeeded him as the leader of the Northeast Peace Preservation Forces (popularly "Northeastern Army"), which controlled China's northeastern provinces of Heilongjiang, Fengtian, and Jilin. In December of the same year he proclaimed his allegiance to the Kuomintang (KMT; Chinese Nationalist Party).

Zhang sought to emphasize modernization in cities like Shenyang, establishing educational institutions and institutions to increase commerce.

=== Purge of Yang and Chang ===
Yang Yuting, a veteran general of the Fengtian clique, and Governor of Heilongjiang Province Chang Yinhuai, were dissatisfied with Zhang Xueliang inheriting the military and political power of the Three Northeastern Provinces. They believed that the young warlord indulged in drinking, women, and opium, lacking real talent and learning. His military achievements before the age of 24 were in fact the work of his deputy, Guo Songling. After the assassination of Zhang Zuolin, although Zhang Xueliang knew the Japanese were behind it, the 27-year-old Young Marshal was powerless to respond. Instead, he leaned toward cooperating with his former enemies and suppressed veteran contributors to the Fengtian clique.

Yang Yuting, considering himself a senior statesman, often spoke bluntly to Zhang and arrogantly flaunted his seniority, frequently ridiculing him—acts seen by many generals as disrespectful. Yang also pressured Zhang Xueliang into establishing the "Northeast Railway Supervisory Office" and appointed Chang Yinhuai to lead it.

On January 10, 1929, Zhang invited several generals including, Yang Yuting and Chang Yinhuai to his home ostensibly for a game of mahjong and had them arrested to face trial that night and then executed. After their execution, Zhang publicly listed their crimes, but simultaneously gave each of their families a condolence payment of 10,000 silver dollars, reflecting the factional struggles within the Fengtian clique. These executions allowed Zhang to replace leaders from his father's administration with those whom Zhang deemed more loyal.

This move shocked the entire Northeast Army. Although the generals professed absolute loyalty, the rift had been formed. To consolidate his authority and prove his capability, Zhang Xueliang sought a decisive victory to win the hearts of his troops.

=== Relationship with Japanese ===
The Japanese believed that Zhang Xueliang, who was known as a womanizer and an opium addict, would be much more subject to Japanese influence than was his father. On this premise, an officer of the Japanese Kwantung Army therefore killed his father, Zhang Zuolin, by exploding a bomb above his train while it crossed under a railroad bridge. Surprisingly, the younger Zhang proved to be more independent and skilled than anyone had expected and declared his support for Chiang Kai-shek, leading to the reunification of China in 1928. With the assistance of Australian journalist William Henry Donald and Dr. Harry Willis Miller, he overcame his opium addiction in 1933 with the administering of Cantharidin auto-serum therapy.

He was given the nickname "Hero of History" (千古功臣) by PRC historians because of his desire to reunite China and rid it of Japanese invaders; and was willing to pay the price and become "vice" leader of China (not because it was good that he was supporting the Kuomintang). In order to rid his command of Japanese influence, he had two prominent pro-Tokyo officials executed in front of the assembled guests at a dinner party in January 1929. In May 1929, relations between the Kuomintang Nanjing and the excessively strengthened Feng Yuxiang worsened. In addition, the Japanese government, dissatisfied with the pro-Kuomintang policy of Zhang Zuolin, and now his son, threatened to "take the most decisive measures to ensure that the Kuomintang flag never flies over Manchuria". The "Young Marshal" supported Nanjing, and Feng's troops were pushed back to the outlying provinces of Chahar and Suiyuan, and in July 1929, Japan officially recognized Kuomintang China.

=== Outside and inside conflicts ===
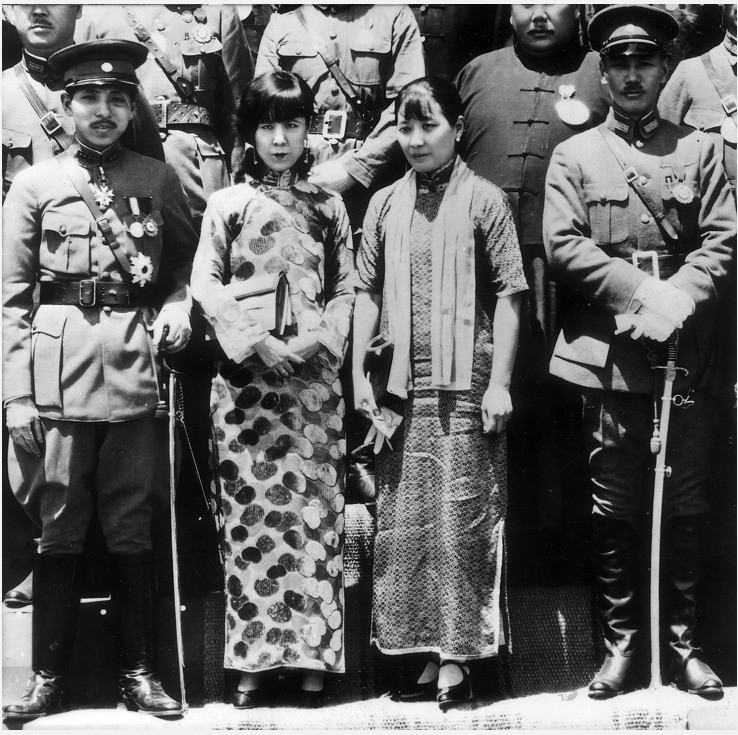
Zhang and Chiang with their respective wives, Yu Fengzhi and Soong Mei-ling

At the same time, Zhang Xueliang and Chiang Kai-shek held a personal meeting in Beiping, at which a decision was made on the armed seizure of the Chinese Eastern Railway or CER. By pushing Zhang Xueliang to take this step, Chiang Kai-shek sought to make the Young Marshal completely dependent on Nanjing and at the same time raise his prestige and get most of the profits from the operation of the CER at the disposal of Nanjing. Zhang Xueliang, in turn, believed that the capture of the CER would strengthen his position in the Northeast, allow him to personally manage the profits of the CER, and ensure his independence from Nanjing. As a result, on July 10, 1929, the Conflict on the CER began. However, the Red Army showed a higher combat capability, and the conflict ended with the signing of the Khabarovsk Protocol of December 22, 1929.

In 1930, when warlords Feng Yuxiang and Yan Xishan attempted to overthrow Chiang Kai-shek's Kuomintang government, Zhang stepped in to support the Nanjing-based government against the Northern warlords in exchange for control of the key railroads in Hebei and the customs revenues from the port city of Tianjin.

== 1930s ==
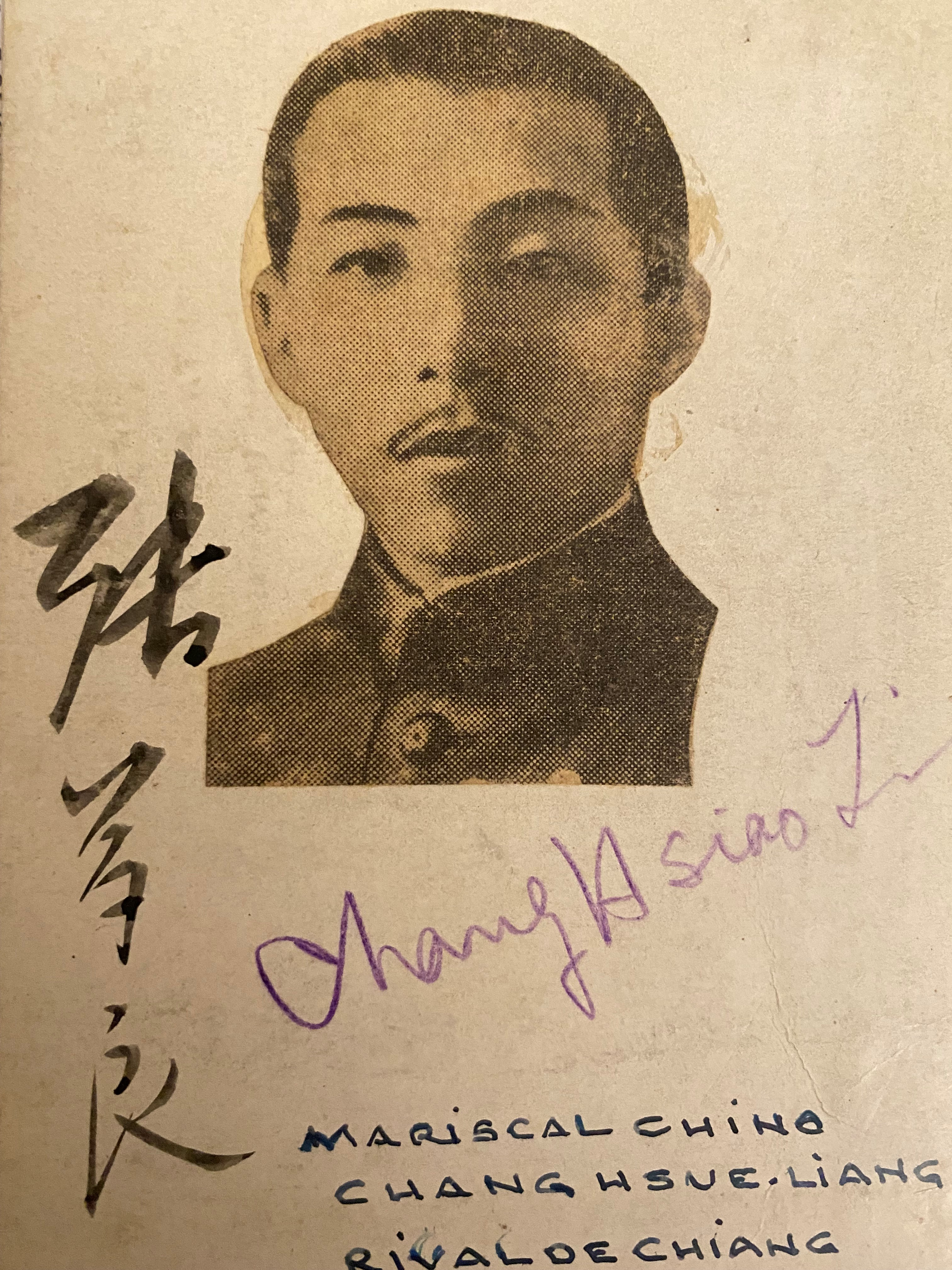
Autograph of Zhang Xueliang (c. 1930s)

=== Mukden Incident ===
A year later, in the September 18 Mukden Incident, Japanese troops attacked Zhang's forces in Shenyang in order to provoke a full-on war with China, which Chiang did not want to face until his forces were stronger. In accordance with this strategy, Zhang's armies withdrew from the front lines without significant engagements, leading to the effective Japanese occupation of Zhang's former northeastern domain. There has been speculation that Chiang Kai-Shek wrote a letter to Zhang asking him to pull his forces back, but Zhang later stated that he himself issued the orders. Apparently, Zhang was aware of how weak his forces were compared to the Japanese and wished to preserve his position by retaining a sizeable army. Nonetheless, this would still be in line with Chiang's overall strategic standings. At the time of the Mukden Incident, it was Zhang Xueliang himself who issued the "non-resistance order". Chiang Kai-shek, in fact, did not receive news of the "incident" until the evening of September 19, after he had arrived in Nanchang, learning of it around 9–10 PM via Shanghai sources. Zhang himself later admitted, "It was our Northeast Army that chose not to resist."

=== Further Retreat ===
After retreating from Manchuria, Zhang and the Northeastern Army took up defensive positions along the Great Wall in Rehe. During this time, Zhang sponsored China's first participation in the Olympic Games.

The Japanese attacked Zhang again in 1933, and after a weak resistance, Zhang was denied reinforcements from the central government and had to retreat further south. He resigned his posts, underwent treatment for his opium addiction, and left for a year-long exile in Europe. When Zhang returned in January 1934, he sought to regain his position in charge of the Northeastern Army. However, this was strongly opposed by both the Japanese and some Nationalist leaders critical of his failure to stop the Japanese advance. Chiang therefore reassigned him to an anti-Communist force in Wuhan, alienating Zhang and the other leaders of the Northeastern Army. Over the next year, Zhang became a more outspoken critic of Chiang's policy of appeasement towards Japan. He continued to pressure Chiang to reappoint him as head of the Northeastern Army, with the hope that he could use the force to fight the Japanese. On October 2, 1935, Chiang granted Zhang's request, but only because he needed the Northeastern Army's support to crush the final Communist base at Yan'an.

=== War with Communists ===
On January 6, 1934, Zhang Xueliang returned to China aboard the Conte Verde from Italy, disembarking in Hong Kong to visit Hu Hanmin en route. On February 1, Chiang Kai-shek arrived in Hangzhou from Nanjing to handle military affairs in Fujian; on the same day, Zhang also went to Hangzhou to pay respects to Chiang, expressing that he would "follow all orders from the central government". On February 7, the Nationalist Government specially appointed Zhang as Deputy Commander of the Bandit Suppression Headquarters for Henan, Hubei, and Anhui provinces. On February 9, Chiang flew from Hangzhou to Nanchang and summoned Zhang before departure to instruct him on anti-Communist operations in Henan, Hubei, and Anhui; upon arrival, Chiang immediately ordered forces in western Jiangxi to pursue and attack the Hunan–Jiangxi Red Army.

On March 1, Zhang assumed his post in Hankou as Deputy Commander of anti-Communist operations in Henan and Hubei, and established a field headquarters in Wuchang on March 5. In June, as Chiang was engaged in the Fifth Encirclement Campaign against the Red Army in Jiangxi, Zhang publicly advocated cooperation between the Nationalists and Communists to save the nation. On June 18, Zhang toured the Henan–Hubei border area, arriving in Huangchuan that day. On June 21, he convened a military meeting there to discuss anti-Communist operations, then proceeded to Shangcheng, and to Lihuang and Lu'an in western Anhui. On June 27, he returned to Wuhan.

On October 9, Chiang departed Wuhan with Zhang and Liu Zhi to inspect the provinces of Henan, Shaanxi, Gansu, and Ningxia. The next day, they reached Zhengzhou and continued to Luoyang, where Chiang presided over the opening ceremony of the Luoyang Military Academy. He Yingqin also arrived from Beiping to meet with Chiang. On October 12, Chiang and Zhang arrived in Xi'an.

On March 1, 1935, the Military Commission's Wuchang Field Headquarters was established, replacing the former Bandit Suppression HQ for Henan, Hubei, and Anhui. Zhang was named Director, with Yang Yongtai as Secretary General and Qian Dajun as Chief of Staff. In April, Chiang ordered Zhang to encircle the Chinese Workers' and Peasants' Red Army, but the campaign ended in failure, with two reorganized divisions being annihilated. This led Zhang to grow increasingly resentful of Chiang's commands.

On April 2, the Nationalist Government promoted Yan Xishan, Feng Yuxiang, Zhang Xueliang, He Yingqin, Li Zongren, Zhu Peide, Tang Shengzhi, and Chen Jitang to the rank of First-Class General in the National Army. On April 14, Zhang flew from Chongqing to Guizhou to meet Chiang, accompanied by Henan Public Security Director Feng Zhanfei and Ta Kung Pao editor-in-chief Zhang Jiluan. He returned to Hankou on April 17.

On September 13, Zhang flew from Hankou to Xi'an to discuss military affairs with Yang Hucheng and Shao Lizi. On September 19, Zhang inspected Tianshui. On September 20, Chiang established the "Northwest Bandit Suppression Headquarters" in Xi'an, to command forces from Shaanxi, Gansu, Ningxia, and Qinghai provinces in encircling the Red Army in the northwest. Chiang once again pushed Zhang to the front lines, appointing him Deputy Commander-in-Chief of the Northwest Bandit Suppression HQ, to act on Chiang's behalf as overall commander.

On September 21, Zhang flew back to Xi'an to coordinate with Yan Xishan's representative Zhang Weiqing on attacking the Red Army in northern Shaanxi. On September 24, he flew with Yang Hucheng and Deng Baoshan to Lanzhou to discuss anti-Communist defense strategies with Zhu Shaoliang. On October 16, Zhang flew from Xi'an to Wuchang to wind up field HQ affairs, returning to Xi'an on October 19. The Wuchang Field Headquarters was officially closed on October 20. That autumn, the Northeast Army was transferred to the northwest, suffering heavy losses in the anti-Communist campaign.

=== Xi'an incident ===
On April 6, 1936, Zhang met with CPC delegate Zhou Enlai to plan the end of the Chinese Civil War. KMT leader Generalissimo Chiang Kai-shek at the time took a passive position against Japan and considered the communists to be a greater danger to the Republic of China than the Japanese, and his overall strategy was to annihilate the communists before focusing his efforts on the Japanese. He believed that "communism was a cancer while the Japanese represented a superficial wound." Growing nationalist anger against Japan made this position very unpopular, and led to Zhang's action against Chiang, known as the Xi'an Incident.

In December 1936, Zhang and General Yang Hucheng kidnapped Chiang, imprisoning him until he agreed to form a united front with the communists against the Japanese invasion. Zhang made radio speeches, explaining that the goal of the mutiny was to unite China to oppose the Japanese, and circulated his manifesto, Urging of the United Front. After two weeks of negotiations, Chiang agreed to unite with the communists and drive the Japanese out of China.

After Chiang negotiated with the Communists, Zhang flew back to Nanjing as a demonstration of good faith.

== Life under house arrest ==
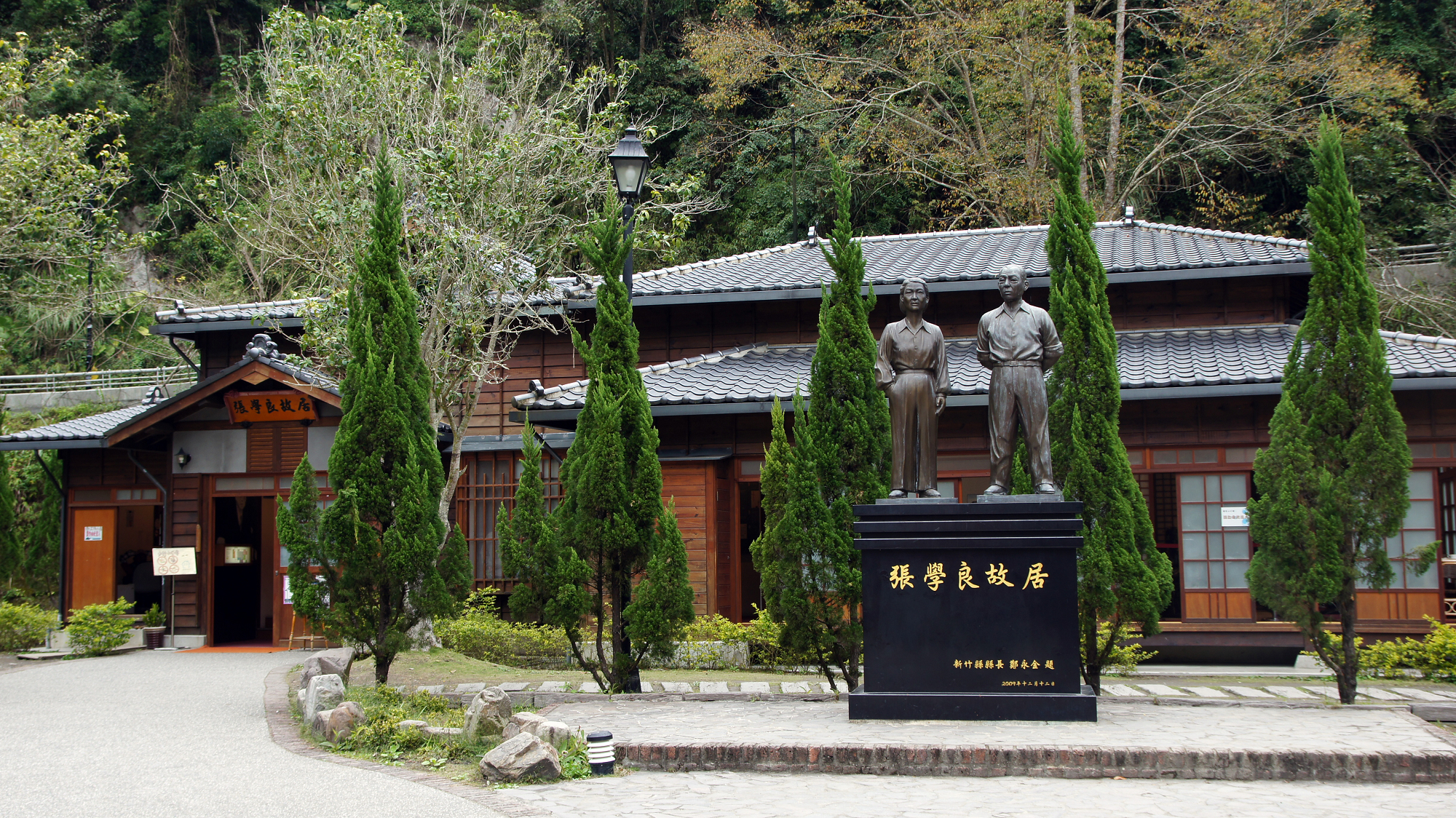
Former residence of Zhang Xueliang in Wufeng, Hsinchu County, Taiwan

=== Trial ===
As soon as Zhang landed in Nanjing, Chiang had him placed under arrest by military police. Zhang wrote Chiang an obsequious letter of apology. Although he never disavowed his role in the Xi'an incident, he admitted that what he had done was a crime, and asked to be punished. He intended the letter to be a private assurance of loyalty to Chiang, but the latter had the letter published so as to discredit Zhang. Li Liejun then presided over a show trial which convicted Zhang of abducting the Generalissimo and attempting to change government policy, sentencing him to ten years in prison. Chiang had him pardoned just a few days later, on January 4, 1937, but with the stipulation that he not be given his civil rights back and that he would remain under protective detention.

=== Mainland China ===
During the first few years of Zhang's imprisonment, he was regularly moved from location to location under the close supervision of Chiang Kai-shek. He was soon joined by his first wife, Yu Fengzhi. The couple began living with the family of one of his wardens, Liu Yiguang. Zhang was allowed access to his bank account, but was (according to custom) expected to pay for most of the expenses related to his detention. In 1940 Yu Fengzhi became sick with breast cancer and was granted permission to seek treatment in the United States. Although they remained affectionate in their letters to one another, the couple would never see each other again. In 1964, Yu agreed to divorce Zhang so that he could marry Edith Chao.

=== Taiwan ===
Zhang was eventually taken to Taiwan, where he remained under house arrest until Chiang's death in 1975. Much of his time was spent studying Ming dynasty literature and the Manchu language and collecting Chinese fan paintings, calligraphy, and other works of art by illustrious artists (a collection of more than 200 works using his studio's name "Dingyuanzhai" (定遠齋) was auctioned with considerable success by Sotheby's on April 10, 1994).

Zhang studied the New Testament. In 1964, he formally married Edith Chao, daughter of a senior official, who left her family in her teens to become his companion and later followed him into exile. His first wife, Yu, said she was so moved by Ms. Chao's devotion that she released her husband from his vows. Zhang and his wife, Edith, became devout Christians who also regularly attended Sunday services at the Methodist chapel in Shilin, a Taipei suburb, with Chiang Kai-shek's family. On March 26, 1988, two months after the death of Chiang Kai-shek's son Chiang Ching-kuo, his freedom was officially restored.

== Later life and death ==
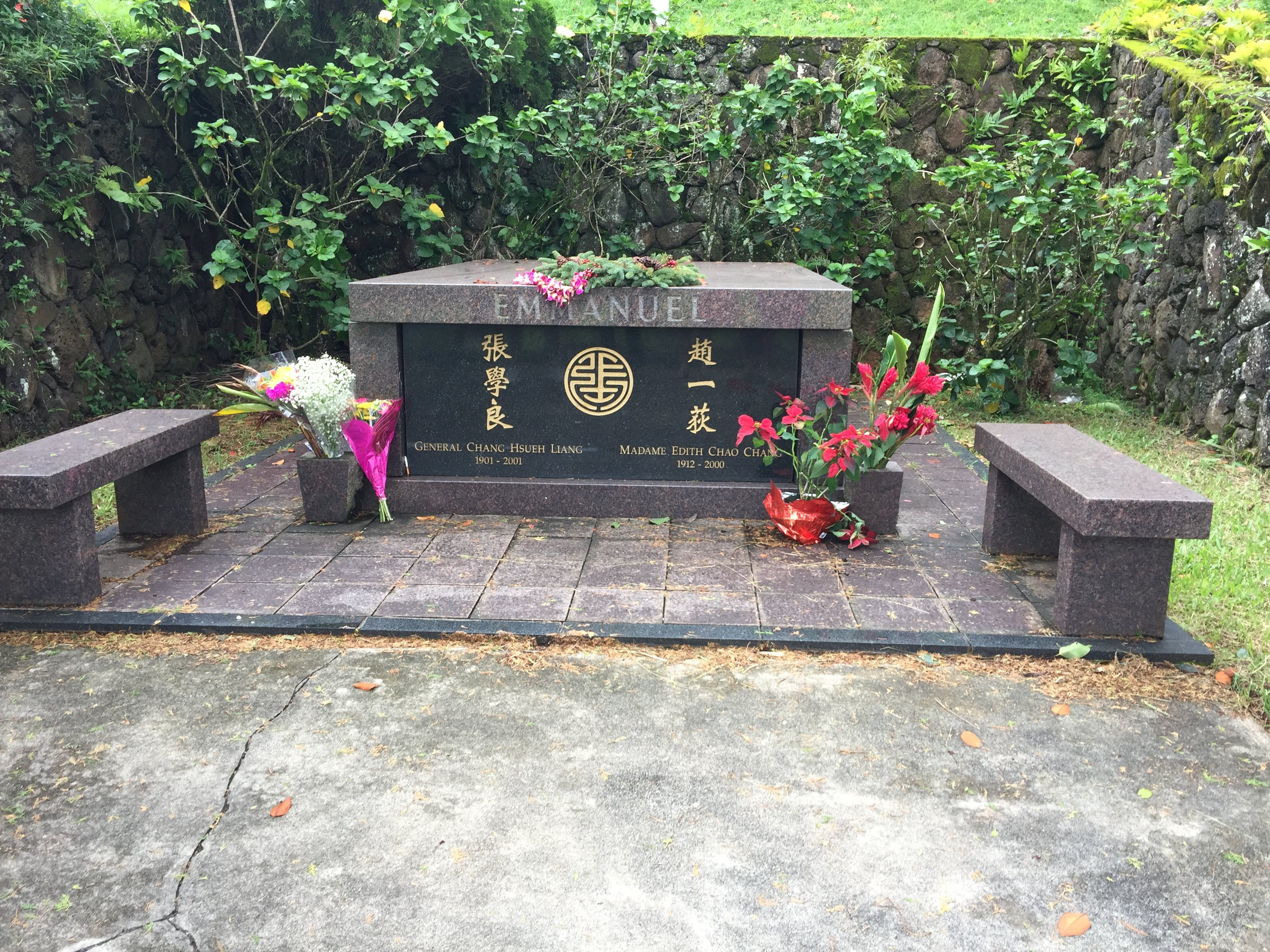
Zhang's gravesite in Valley of the Temples Memorial Park

In 1991, Zhang made his first trip abroad after being released from house arrest, visiting San Francisco to see friends and family who had moved there. Zhang emigrated to Honolulu, Hawaii in 1995. There he lived with his younger brother Chang Hsueh-sen, who was working as a hotelier. He remained there until his death in 2001.

Although never personally a communist, Zhang is regarded by the Chinese Communist Party (CCP) and the People's Republic of China as a patriotic hero for his role in ending the encirclement campaigns and beginning the Second Sino-Japanese War. There were numerous pleas for him to visit mainland China, but Zhang declined, citing his political closeness to the KMT and his frail health. Despite his lack of return, he was named honorary President of Northeastern University in Shenyang in 1993, where he had previously served as president between 1928 and 1936. Zhang was also named honorary chairman of Harbin Institute of Technology in 1993.

In June 2000, Edith Chao died at the age of 88. On October 14 of the following year, Zhang died of pneumonia at the age of 100. (Note: Following the Chinese way of counting, his age is often given as 101.) at Straub Hospital in Honolulu. Representatives from both China and Taiwan attended his funeral in Honolulu, along with Yan Mingfu, the former head of the CCP's United Front Work Department and the son of Zhang's close friend, Yan Baohang.

== Awards ==
- (Republic of China (1912–1949)) :
  - Order of Rank and Merit, Fifth Class (1920)
- (Taiwan) :
  - Order of Blue Sky and White Sun with Grand Cordon
  - Order of Wen-Hu, Second Class (1921)
  - Order of Wen-Hu, Third Class (1919)

== Family ==
Parents

- Zhang Zuolin (1875–1928), father of Chang, Warlord of Manchuria, assassinated by the Japanese
- Zhao Chungui (趙春桂, ?–1912), mother of Chang

Spouses

- Yu Fengzhi (于鳳至; Yü Feng-chih, also romanized as Yu Feng Tze,1897–1990), first wife of Zhang (m. 1916; div. 1964). She immigrated to the U.S. in 1940, where she was known as Feng Tze Chang. She died in Los Angeles.
- Gu Ruiyu (谷瑞玉, 1904–1946), second wife of Zhang (m. 1924; div. 1931)
- Zhao Yidi (趙一荻; Edith Chao Chang, 1912–2000), mistress and later second wife of Zhang (m. 1964), immigrated with him to the U.S. in 1995, died in Honolulu, Hawaii.

Children

- Pauline Tao, born Chang Lu-ying (張閭瑛 Zhang Lüying, c. 1916–), eldest daughter born to Yu, resided in the U.S.
- Martin Chang Lu-hsun (張閭珣 Zhang Lüxun, c. 1918–1986), eldest son born to Yu, died in Taipei.
- Raymond Chang Lu-yu (張閭玗 Zhang Lüyu, c. 1919–1981), second son born to Yu, died in Los Angeles.
- Chang Lu-chi (張閭琪 Zhang Lüqi, c. 1920–1929), third son born to Yu
- Robert Chang Lu-lin (張閭琳 Zhang Lülin, 1930–), illegitimate son born to Chao, resides in the U.S.

Siblings

- Zhang Xueming (1908–1983), defected to the Communists, died in Beijing
- Hsueh Tseng Chang (張學曾 Zhang Xuezeng, 1911–2004), died in Novato, CA
- Zhang Xuesi (張學思 Chang Hsueh-ssu, 1916–1970), defected to the Communists, died in China
- Henry Chang Hsueh-sen (張學森 Zhang Xuesen, 1920–1995), died in Beijing while visiting
- Zhang Xuejun (張學浚 Chang Hsueh-chun, 1922–1984), died in Taiwan
- Zhang Xueying (張學英 Chang Hsueh-ying, 1924–?)
- Zhang Xuequan (張學銓 Chang Hsueh-chuan, 1925–1992 or 1996), died in Tianjin

== In popular culture ==
- Zhang was portrayed by Andy Lau in a cameo appearance in the 1994 martial arts film Drunken Master II.
- Zhang was centrally featured in the 1981 Chinese film The Xi'an Incident, directed by Cheng Yin. The film won three awards at the 2nd annual Golden Rooster Awards.
- A 2007 TV series on the Xi'an Incident was produced and aired in mainland China, with Zhang Xueliang being portrayed by Hu Jun.
- The Peter H. L. Chang reading room at Columbia University's Butler Library is named after Zhang. The library hosts a collection of Zhang's papers.
- Beijing microbrewery Great Leap Brewing named its Little General IPA after Zhang.
- A Chinese TV series titled Young Marshal is based on Zhang's life.

== See also ==
- Warlord era
- History of the Republic of China
- Military of the Republic of China
- Politics of the Republic of China
- Sino-German cooperation (1911–1941)
