= Pailou =

Pailou may refer to:

- Paifang, a traditional Chinese architectural form like an archway

== Towns ==
- Pailou, Chizhou, in Guichi, Chizhou, Anhui
- Pailou, Hubei, in Dongbao District
- Pailou, Liaoning

== Townships ==
- Pailou Township, Qianshan County, in Qianshan, Anhui
- Pailou Township, Weichang County, in Weichang Manchu and Mongol Autonomous County, Hebei

== Villages ==
- Pailou, Shawo Township, in Shawo Township, Hubei
