= Xiafangshen mine =

Mine in China

- Interactive map of Xiafangshen mine
- Location: Pailou, Haicheng City, Liaoning, China; 40.725213°N 122.809652°E
- Products: Magnesium

The Xiafangshen Magnesium Mine (Chinese: 下房身村东山镁石矿; pinyin: Xiafangshen cun Dongshan meishi kuang) is one of the largest magnesium mines in China and in the world. The mine is located in the central part of Liaoning Province, at the Xiafangshen Sedimentary Metamorphic Magnesite Deposit. The mine has an estimated reserves of 258 million tonnes of ore with 47.3% magnesium content.
