= Zhang Xueming =

Chinese soldier and mayor

- 張學銘
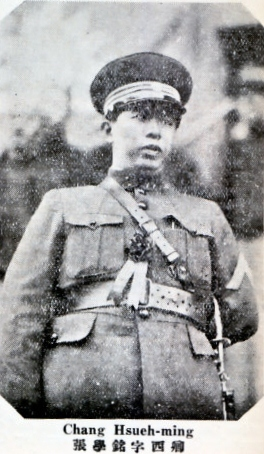
- Zhang Xueming in 1931

Mayor of Tianjin
- In office April 1931 – December 6, 1931
- Succeeded by: Chou Lung-kuang

Personal details
- Born: 1908 Haicheng, Fengtian, Qing Empire
- Died: April 9, 1983 (aged 74–75) Beijing, People's Republic of China
- Citizenship: Republic of China; People's Republic of China
- Party: Revolutionary Committee of the Chinese Kuomintang
- Spouse(s): Mrs. Yao; Zhu Luo Jun
- Children: Zhang Lue (daughter); Zhang Yuanchong (son); Zhang Pengju (son)
- Parent: Zhang Zuolin (father)
- Relatives: Zhang Xueliang (brother)
- Education: Japanese Infantry Training School
- Occupation: Politician, soldier

Military service
- Allegiance: Fengtian Clique; Republic of China; People's Republic of China
- Branch/service: Fengtian Army; National Revolutionary Army; People's Liberation Army Ground Force
- Years of service: 1928-31; 1945-49
- Rank: Lieutenant general
- Battles/wars: Japanese invasion of Manchuria; Chinese Civil War

Zhang Xueming (simplified Chinese: 張学铭; traditional Chinese: 張學銘; pinyin: Zhāng Xuémíng; Wade–Giles: Chang Hsueh-ming, 1908 - April 9, 1983) was a Chinese soldier and politician. He served as the mayor of Tianjin in 1931, during the Japanese invasion of Manchuria, before being forced into exile. After the Second World War, Zhang defected from the Kuomintang and joined the Communist forces during the Chinese Civil War.

== Biography ==
Zhang Xueming was the second son of Zhang Zuolin; like his father, Xueming was also born in Haicheng. Xueming was a full brother of the famed "Young Marshal", Zhang Xueliang.

In 1928, Zhang studied at the Japanese Infantry Training School, returning in 1929, when he began to work for the Northeastern Army. By October 1930, during the Central Plains War, he, with the support of Chiang Kai-shek and the recommendation of Kuomintang (KMT) elder Wu Tiecheng, became the police chief in Tianjin. In April 1931, he became the mayor of Tianjin.

Within a few months, amid the backdrop of the Japanese invasion of Manchuria, Tianjin was wracked with disorder and riot, which was not helped by the presence of the Tianjin concessions, which included, among the four major concessions, a concession to Japan, which just happened to be the one closest to the areas of the city inhabited by the Chinese. Given the significant disorder, Zhang was forced to declare martial law again and again.

November 1931 proved a critical month for him: numerous riots, disorders, and fighting broke out, on the ninth, the eleventh, and the twenty-sixth; time and again, the Japanese shelled the city. On the ninth, the Japanese fomented a mob that attacked Chinese police, shelled the city, and left four dead. The clash of the eleventh included declarations of martial law as far as Beijing and Shanghai, the seizure of Nankai University by armed rebels, the shelling of schools by the Japanese, and calls for war; the clean-up lasted until the fifteenth, during which Zhang offered money and pardons to all those who surrendered their arms. Finally, on the evening of November 26, rioters and irregulars, including Chinese gendarmes, likely under the command of Mayor Zhang, attacked the Japanese and Italian concessions, prompting shells from both, protests from the Japanese, and martial law in all the concessions; the fighting raged for days before ending by agreement on the 30th, leaving at least eighteen dead. After protests from the Japanese minister, the Nanjing government reacted with compromise and concessions, forcing the resignation of Zhang Xueming on December 6. He then left China to study abroad.

After initially living in Europe and Hong Kong before and during the Second World War, the Pacific War and the fall of Hong Kong forced Zhang to return to the mainland, returning to Nanjing. The Wang Jingwei regime was forced to accept him, and even appointed him onto their military commission in 1943.

Zhang Xueming's activities were not fully investigated at the end of the war, and so he was appointed a lieutenant general in the National Revolutionary Army. Though accounts differ, he either surrendered to the Communists or soon turned on the KMT; regardless, during the Chinese Civil War, he was reported to command a garrison of 50,000 communist troops in Manchuria. (The Communists had promised an independent Manchuria run by the Zhang family, which never came to fruition.)

In 1949, as the fall of the Republic's hold on the mainland neared, Zhang stayed put in Tianjin. Under the tutelage and care of Zhou Enlai, he was spared reprisals; indeed, in 1959, he was invited to attend the third national session of the Chinese People's Political Consultative Conference, most probably as a member of the Revolutionary Committee of the Chinese Kuomintang.

Later, he became the director of the Tianjin People's Park, deputy director of the Municipal Engineering Bureau, deputy director of the Tianjin chapter of the Revolutionary Committee of the Chinese Kuomintang, and, ultimately, a member of the Central Committee of that group.

He died on April 9, 1983, in Beijing, at the age of 75.

== Personal life ==
Zhang had a daughter, Zhang Lue, with his first wife, Mrs. Yao; the marriage would end in divorce.

As Zhang left China to go into exile, he encountered a group of secondary school students; one of whom, Zhu Luo Jun, became his second wife. With her, he also had two sons: his eldest son, Zhang Yuan Chong, was a businessman in Hong Kong; the second son, Zhang Pengju (张鹏举), worked at the Tianjin Municipal Engineering Bureau.

After the war, Zhang Xueming lived in the former British concession in Tianjin, on Hong Kong Road (now No. 50 South Road Mu).
