= Yingluo =

Yingluo may refer to:

- Yingluo (ornament)
- Yingluo, Liaoning
