= Wangshi =

Wangshi may refer to the following towns in China:

- Wangshi, Funan County (王堰镇), Anhui
- Wangshi, Lixin County (王市镇), Anhui
- Wangshi, Hubei (网市镇), in Jianli County, Jingzhou, Hubei
- Wangshi, Liaoning (王石镇), in Haicheng, Liaoning
