= Yingluo, Liaoning =

Yingluo 英落镇
- Town
- Location in Liaoning
- Coordinates: 40°38′39″N 122°42′18″E
- Country: China
- Province: Liaoning
- Prefecture-level city: Anshan
- County-level city: Haicheng

Area
  - Total: 161.3 km^{2} (62.3 sq mi)

Population
  - Total: 39,944
  - Density: 247.6/km^{2} (641.4/sq mi)
- Time zone: UTC+8 (China Standard)
- Postal code: 114000
- Area code: 0412

Yingluo (Chinese: 英落镇; pinyin: Ying Luo) is a small town in Liaoning Province, located 23.6 km southeast of Haicheng, Liaoning. A major cross-town road connects the town with Pailou on the northeast and Dashiqiao City on the west.

The town has a total area of 161.3 square kilometers, with a population of 33,944. Yingluo township includes 27 villages and one subdistrict.

There are magnesium and talc mines in Yingluo. The mining and processing of ore are major industries of the town. Yingluo also produces fruits in large quantity.

== See also ==
- List of township-level divisions of Liaoning
