= Zhang Zuolin =

Chinese warlord and politician (1875–1928)

Generalissimo Zhang Zuolin
- 張作霖
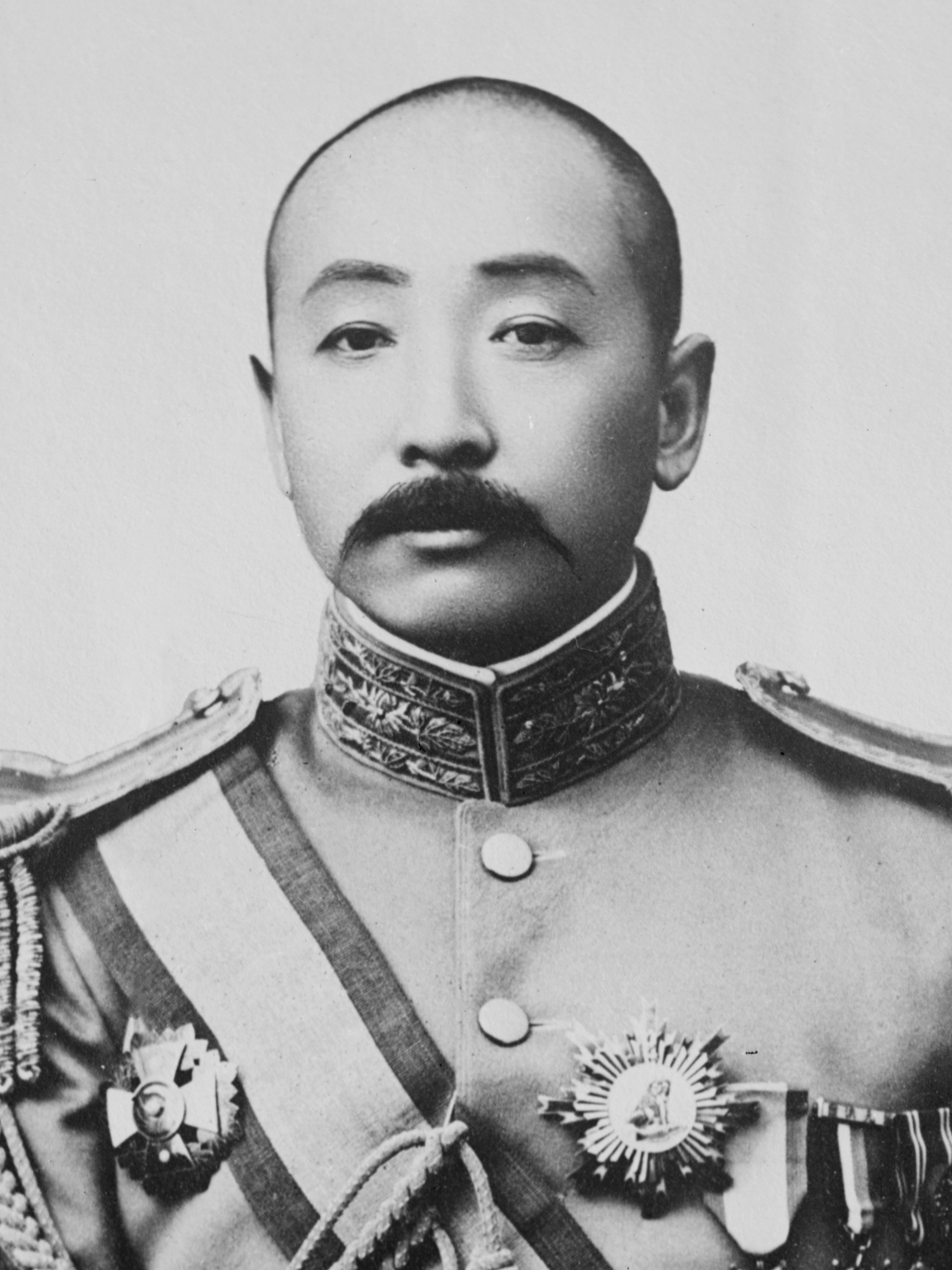
- Zhang in 1924

Generalissimo of the Military Government of China
- In office June 18, 1927 – June 4, 1928
- Premier: Pan Fu
- Preceded by: Wellington Koo (as acting president)
- Succeeded by: Tan Yankai (as chairman of the national government)

Warlord of Manchuria
- In office 1922 – June 4, 1928
- Succeeded by: Zhang Xueliang

Personal details
- Born: March 19, 1875 Haicheng, Fengtian, Qing Empire
- Died: June 4, 1928 (aged 53) Shenyang, Fengtian, Republic of China
- Cause of death: Assassination by bombing
- Resting place: Zhang Zuolin Tomb, Gaoli Village, Zhangdang Town, Dongzhou District, Fushun, Liaoning Province
- Party: Fengtian clique
- Spouses: Zhao Chungui; Lu Shouxuan
- Children: 14, including: Zhang Xueliang; Zhang Xueming; Zhang Xuezheng; Zhang Xuesi; Zhang Xuesen
- Awards: Order of Rank and Merit; Order of the Golden Grain; Order of Wen-Hu
- Nickname(s): Old Marshal; Rain Marshal; Mukden Tiger; King of the Northeast

Military service
- Allegiance: Qing dynasty; (Republic of China (1912–1949)) Republic of China; (Republic of China (1912–1949)) Fengtian clique
- Years of service: 1895–1928
- Rank: Grand Marshal of the Republic of China, generalissimo
- Battles/wars: First Sino-Japanese War; Boxer Rebellion; Xinhai Revolution; First Zhili–Fengtian War; Second Zhili–Fengtian War; Anti-Fengtian War; Northern Expedition (DOW)

Zhang Zuolin (Note: Traditional Chinese: 張作霖; simplified Chinese: 张作霖; pinyin: Zhāng Zuòlín; Wade–Giles: Chang Tso-lin; courtesy name Yuting (雨亭; Yǔtíng) and nicknamed Zhang Laogang (張老疙瘩; Zhāng Lǎo Gēda)) (March 19, 1875 – June 4, 1928) was a Chinese general, statesman, and warlord who ruled Manchuria from 1916 until his assassination in 1928. He led the Fengtian clique, one of the most powerful factions during the Warlord Era. In 1927, he became the leader of the Beiyang government and was declared Generalissimo of the Republic of China.

Born to a poor peasant's family in Manchuria, Zhang fought in the First Sino-Japanese War and became a prominent mounted bandit in the 1890s. After the Boxer Rebellion, his troops became a regiment of the Qing dynasty's army, and during the Russo-Japanese War, they were hired by the Japanese Army as mercenaries. During the 1911 Revolution, Zhang initially fought against the revolutionaries, and after the foundation of the Republic of China supported the Beiyang government. Zhang founded the Fengtian clique and gradually expanded his Northeastern Army, which established his supremacy over the three northeastern provinces (Fengtian, Jilin and Heilongjiang).

Zhang's government in Manchuria initiated important reforms and investments in agriculture and industry, resulting in good development. He was supported by the Japanese, who viewed him as best representing their economic interests. Seeking to extend his power to northern China, Zhang fought wars against the Anhui and Zhili cliques, after which he became the most powerful figure in the Beiyang government and proclaimed himself Generalissimo in 1927. Zhang's troops were defeated by the Kuomintang's Northern Expedition in 1928. During his retreat, he was assassinated by officers of the Japanese Kwantung Army. He was succeeded in Manchuria by his son, Zhang Xueliang, who recognized the Nationalist government.

== Origins ==
=== Early life ===
Zhang was born in 1875 in Haicheng, a county in southern Fengtian province (modern Liaoning) in northeastern China, to poor parents. He received little formal education, and the only non-military trade that he learned in his lifetime was a small amount of veterinary science. His grandfather had come to the northeast after fleeing a famine in Zhili (modern Hebei) in 1821. As a child, Zhang was known by the nickname "Pimple." He spent his early youth hunting, fishing and brawling. He hunted hares in the Manchurian countryside to help feed his family. In appearance he was thin and short.

Zhang asserted that he was a Han Chinese Bannerman.

When he became old enough to work, he got a job at a stable in an inn, where he became familiar with many bandit gangs operating in Manchuria at the time. At the age of twenty, he enlisted as a cavalry soldier to fight in the First Sino–Japanese War (1894–1895). After the end of the war, he returned to his hometown and became a mounted bandit. In one version of his beginnings as a warlord, during a hunting trip he spotted a wounded bandit (Honghuzi) on horseback, killed him, took his horse and became a bandit himself. By his late 20s he had formed a small personal army, acquiring something of a Green Forest/Robin Hood reputation. His bandit career was euphemistically referred to as his experience in the "University of the Green Forest", as he was illiterate. During his time of banditry, he became close with some figures who later occupied important positions in his military clique.

In 1900 the Boxer Rebellion broke out, and Zhang's gang joined the imperial army. In peacetime he hired his men out as security escorts for traveling merchants. In the Russo-Japanese War of 1904–05 the Japanese Army employed Zhang and his men as mercenaries. At the end of the Qing dynasty Zhang managed to have his men recognised as a regiment of the regular Chinese army, patrolling the borders of Manchuria and suppressing other bandit gangs. The American surgeon Louis Livingston Seaman met Zhang during the Russo-Japanese War, and took several photographs of him and his troops as well as writing an account of his journey.

=== Growth of power in Manchuria ===
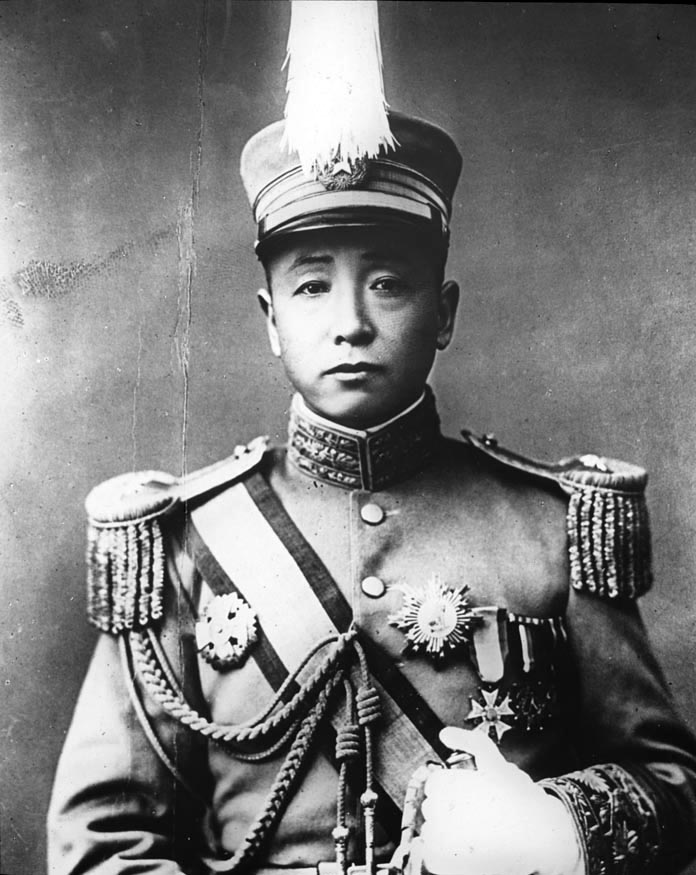
Zhang in Beiyang Army uniform

During the 1911 Xinhai Revolution some military commanders wanted to declare independence for Manchuria; but the pro-Manchu governor used Zhang's regiment to set up a "Manchurian People's Peacekeeping Council", intimidating would-be rebels and revolutionaries. For his efforts in preventing civil disturbance and revolution, Zhang was named the Vice Minister of Military Affairs.

On January 1, 1912 Sun Yat-sen became the first President of the Republic of China in Nanjing. Yuan Shikai, operating out of Beijing, sent other northern military commanders a series of telegrams, advising them to oppose Sun's administration. To gain Zhang's loyalty, Yuan sent him a large shipment of military provisions; Zhang sent Yuan an enormous (and costly) ginseng root in return to symbolize their friendship. Zhang then murdered a number of leading figures in his base city of Shenyang (then known as "Mukden"), and was rewarded with a series of impressive-sounding titles by the nearly defunct Qing court. When it became obvious to Zhang that Yuan would usurp control of the central government, he endorsed Yuan's rule over that of either Sun or the Manchus. After Zhang put down a rebellion in June 1912, Yuan raised him to the rank of Lieutenant-General. In 1913 Yuan attempted to move Zhang away from Manchuria by having him transferred to Mongolia, but Zhang reminded Yuan of his successful efforts to keep local order, and refused.

In 1915, when it became clear that Yuan intended to declare himself emperor, Zhang was one of the few officials who supported him. Besides political opportunism, Zhang saw Yuan as a central, unifying, and legitimate figure. Furthermore, Yuan had promoted him to military governor of Fengtian to gain his support. Zhang's main rival for power in Manchuria, Zhang Xiluan, had been asked about Yuan's ambitions, and suggested to Yuan that he "think about it a bit more", for which Zhang Xiluan was recalled to Beijing while Zhang Zuolin was promoted.

In March 1916, after many southern provinces revolted against Yuan Shikai's government, Zhang supported him but expelled a local military governor sent by Duan Qirui to replace him, with some support from local Japanese officers in the Kwantung Army. Beijing accepted Zhang's authority and Yuan appointed Zhang superintendent of military affairs in Liaoning (known as "Fengtian" until 1929). After Yuan died in June 1916, the new central government named Zhang both military and civil governor of Liaoning, the essential components of a successful warlord.

Zhang, a pragmatist, had always remained cordial with Puyi, the last Emperor of China, and had sent him a gift of £1,600 for his wedding as a token of loyalty. Zhang sought good relations with Puyi in order to increase his power and cement his legitimacy if a restoration was ever attempted. In 1917 he plotted with Zhang Xun, a Qing-loyalist general, to restore the abdicated Puyi to the throne. Zhang Zuolin proposed talking to the National Assembly about a possible restoration. After Zhang Xun rebelled, Zhang Zuolin remained neutral and actually supported Duan Qirui in suppressing Zhang Xun after it became clear that Duan would win. Zhang was able to absorb soldiers of nearby commanders who had been linked to the rebellion, increasing his own power. He intervened and took control of China's northernmost province, Heilongjiang, after a rebellion there forced the local governor to flee. Because the governor of Jilin province had been linked to the attempt to restore the monarchy, Zhang had allies from Jilin successfully agitate for the governor's dismissal in Beijing. By 1918 Zhang's control of Manchuria was complete, except for the small areas held by the Empire of Japan.

A Tianjin-based honghuzi leader negotiated with Zhang Zuolin.

== Fortress Manchuria ==
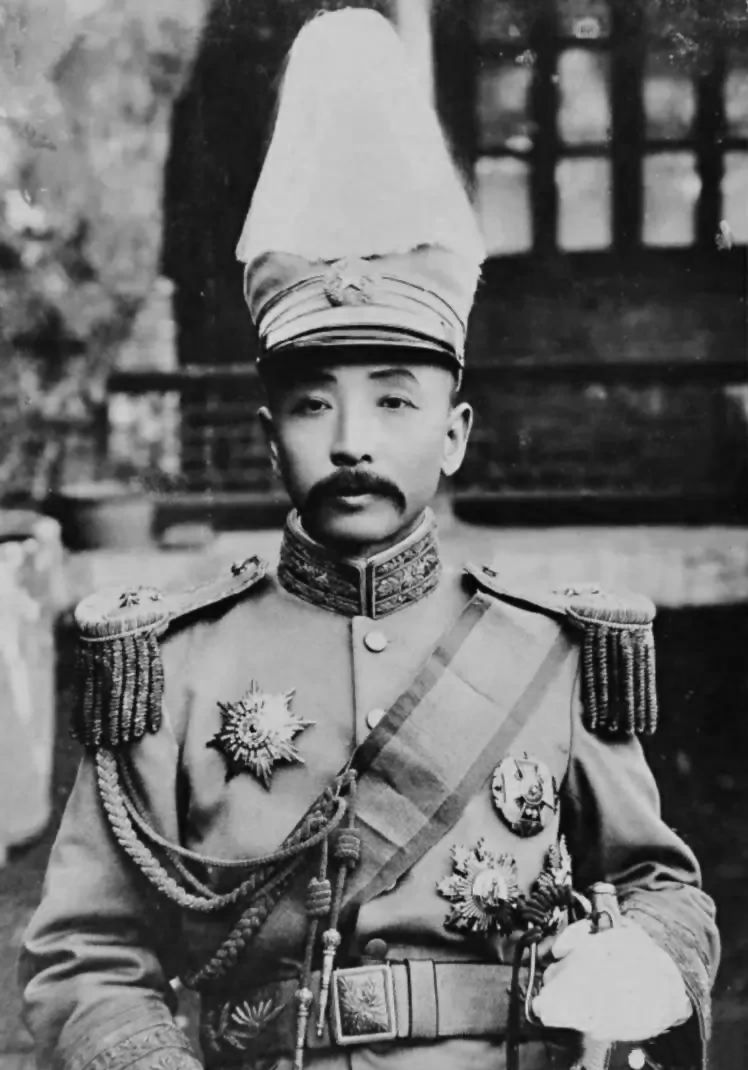
Zhang in the 1920s

In 1920 Zhang was the supreme ruler of Manchuria. The central government acknowledged this by appointing him Governor-General of the Three Eastern Provinces. He began to surround himself in luxury, building a chateau-style home near Shenyang, and had at least five wives (an accepted practice of any powerful or wealthy Chinese at the time). In 1925 his personal fortune was estimated at over 18 million yuan (roughly $2.6 million).

His power rested on the Fengtian Army, which was composed of about 100,000 men in 1922 and almost triple that number by the end of the decade. It had obtained large stocks of weapons left over from World War I and included naval units, an air force and an armaments industry. Zhang integrated a large number of local militias into his army, and thus prevented Manchuria from falling into the chaos which reigned in China proper at the time. Jilin province was ruled by a military governor, who was said to be a cousin of Zhang; Heilongjiang had its own regional warlord, who never displayed any ambitions outside the province.

Although Manchuria officially remained a part of the Republic of China, it became more or less an independent state isolated from China by its geography and protected by the Fengtian Army. The only pass at Shanhaiguan, where the Great Wall meets the sea, could easily be closed. In a time when the central government was barely able to pay the salaries of its civil servants, no more revenues were forwarded to Beijing. In 1922 Zhang took control of the only rail link, the Beijing–Shenyang Railway, north of the Great Wall and also kept tax revenues from this railroad. Only postal and customs revenues continued to be sent to Beijing, because they had been pledged to the victorious foreign powers after the failed Boxer Rebellion of 1900, and Zhang feared their intervention.

It was proposed that Zhang Zuolin's domain (the "Three Eastern Provinces") take Outer Mongolia under its administration by the Bogda Khan and Bodo in 1922 after pro-Soviet Mongolian Communists seized control of Outer Mongolia.

== Japanese and Russian influences ==
Manchuria shared a long border with Russia, which had been weakened militarily after the October Revolution. The line of the Chinese Eastern Railway, which was under Russian control, ran through northern Manchuria and the land immediately on either side of the tracks was considered to be Russian territory. From 1917 to about 1924 the new Communist government in Moscow was having such difficulties establishing itself in Siberia that often it was not clear who was in charge of operating the railway on the Russian side. Still, Zhang avoided a showdown and after 1924 the Soviets re-established their dominance over the railroad.

The situation's precariousness was demonstrated by an outbreak of pneumonic plague in Hailar, a town at the western end of the Chinese Eastern Railway, in October 1920. Chinese troops were present in great number and turned railway quarantine into a farce. The soldiers freed some of their comrades who had been imprisoned as contacts, and they escaped to the mining town of Dalainor on the Amur River, where a quarter of the population died. In the other direction, all of the towns along the Chinese Eastern Railway as far as Vladivostok were infected. Around 9,000 died, while only a few contacts were able to reach south Manchuria.

The Japanese posed more of a problem. After the Russo-Japanese war of 1904–05 they had gained two important outposts in south Manchuria: The Kwantung Leased Territory consisted of a 218-square-mile (560 km^{2}) peninsula in the southernmost part of Manchuria. It included the ice-free port of Dairen (Chinese: Dalian), which became the main link to Japan. Reaching northward from the colony, the South Manchurian Railway passed through Shenyang (referred to as Mukden by the Japanese), linking up with the Chinese Eastern Railway in Changchun. The land on either side of the railway tracks remained extraterritorial, now being controlled by the Japanese Kwantung Army. This army maintained 7,000–14,000 men in Manchuria, tolerating and being tolerated by the Fengtian Army, although Zhang kept up a war of words, playing on anti-Japanese sentiments in the Chinese public.

Lu Zhankui, a Mongol officer under Zhang, was instrumental in bringing Oomoto leader Onisaburo Deguchi, and Aikido founder Morihei Ueshiba, to Mongolia in 1924.

== Civil reform ==
At the beginning of the 1920s, Zhang transformed Manchuria from an unimportant frontier region to one of the most prosperous parts of China. He had inherited a financially weak provincial government—in 1917 Fengtian faced ten outstanding loans from foreign-controlled consortia and banks totaling over 12 million yuan. Zhang chose Wang Yongjiang, who had served as head of a regional tax office, for the task of solving Fengtian's financial problems. He was appointed director of the bureau of finance.

A number of currencies were circulating in the province, as was the custom in China, and the paper notes issued by the provincial government had experienced a steady depreciation in value. Wang decided to switch to a silver standard and set the initial value of the new silver yuan equal to the Japanese gold yen, which was accepted throughout Korea and Manchuria. Much to the surprise of the Chinese, the new currency even gained in value against the gold yen, although Japanese businessmen claimed that it was not backed up by sufficient silver reserves. Wang then used the newly gained credibility to introduce another note, the Fengtian dollar, which was not convertible into silver anymore. However, it was accepted by the government for the payment of taxes, a sign of faith in its own currency.

Next, Wang turned to the chaotic tax collecting system. Because of his former job, he was well acquainted with the abuses of the system and introduced a number of controls. The provincial government had also invested government funds in various enterprises, many of which were poorly managed. Wang ordered a review of government-sponsored firms. From 1918, revenues rose steadily, and by 1921 all outstanding loans had been repaid and there was even a budget surplus. Wang was rewarded by being appointed Civil Governor of Fengtian province while remaining director of the bureau of finance. He retained the title of Military Governor of Fengtian. Still, more than two-thirds of the budget was allocated to the military.

== Internal strife ==
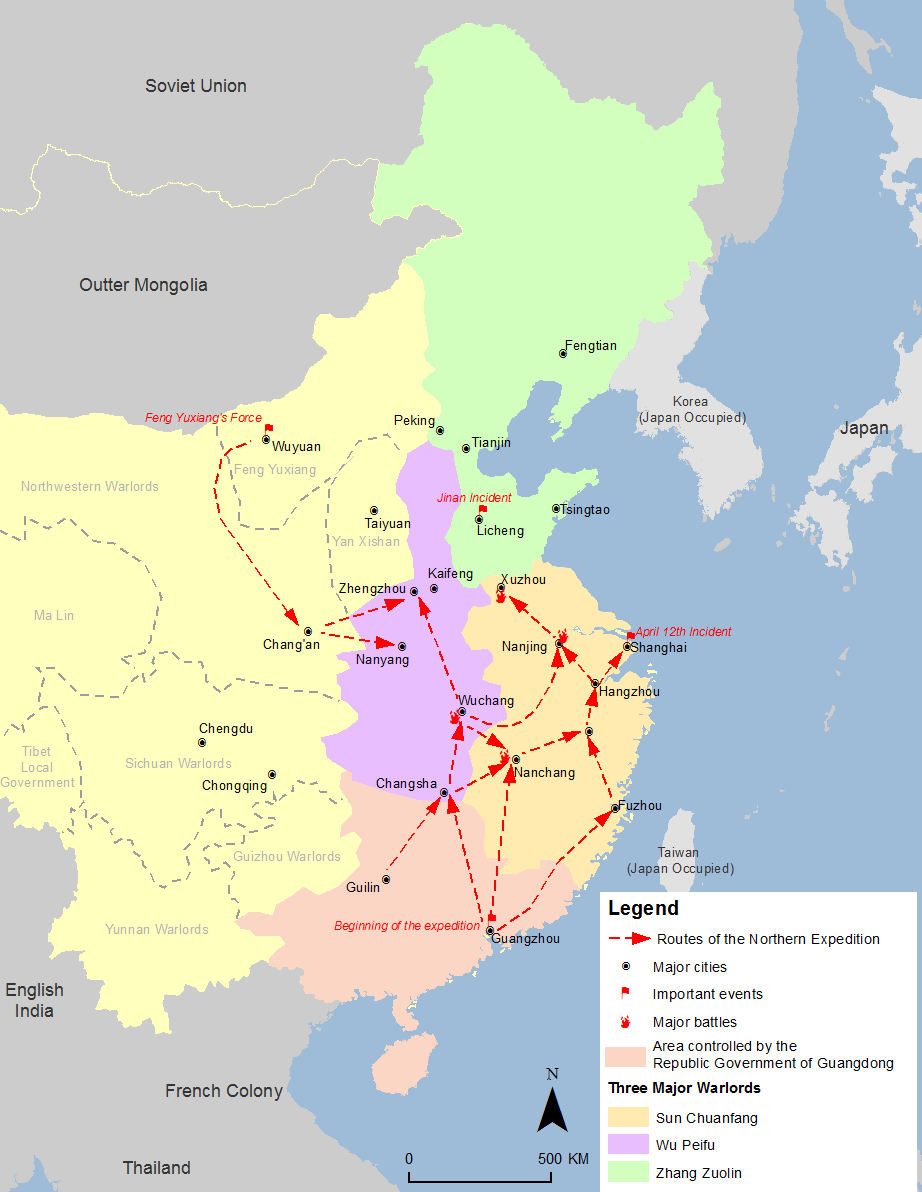
Map showing the territory controlled by Zhang Zuolin (in green) during the Northern Expedition period

Chinese FT

In 1919 France had left Renault FT tanks in Vladivostok after the joint Allied intervention, and Zhang Zuolin soon incorporated them into the Manchurian Army.

In the summer of 1920, Zhang made a foray into North China on the other side of the Great Wall, trying to topple Duan Qirui, the leading warlord of Beijing. He did this by supporting another warlord, Cao Kun, with troops and they successfully ousted Duan. As a reward, Zhang was granted control over most of Inner Mongolia to the west of Manchuria.

In December 1921, Zhang visited Beijing; at his request, the entire cabinet, led by Jin Yunpeng, resigned, leaving him free to appoint a new government. Installing Liang Shiyi as premier, he proposed a new constitution and the resolution of the republic's financial difficulties. Now a figure of national prominence, he quickly came into conflict with Wu Peifu, a divisional commander of the North China Zhili clique, which was based in the province of Zhili that surrounded Beijing.

In the spring of 1922, Zhang personally took the position of Commander-in-Chief of the Fengtian Army, and on April 19 his forces entered China proper. As his men took Beijing three days later, fighting soon broke out. On May 4, the Fengtian Army was seriously defeated by the Zhili Army in what came to be known as the First Zhili–Fengtian War. Three-thousand troops had been killed and 7,000 wounded, and Zhang's units retreated to Shanhai Pass. Zhili forces were in control of Beijing and Zhang's image as a national leader had been destroyed and he reacted by declaring Manchuria independent from Beijing in May 1922.

On June 22, Wang left Shenyang for Japanese-controlled Dalian, allegedly for treatment of an eye infection. From there he challenged Zhang by demanding restrictions to military spending and complete control over civil affairs. Zhang gave in, lifted martial law and agreed to a separation of civil and military administration in all of the three provinces. Wang returned on August 6, thereby ensuring Manchuria's continued stability.

== Regional development ==
After Zhang's forces were defeated in the First Zhili-Fengtian War, they brought captured radio equipment and expertise back to the northeast. This became the basis for the radio industry in Manchuria and Zhang's administration built two of the most powerful and largest radio transmitters in Asia. Zhang became the patron of China's first government broadcasting. The northeast's emphasis on radio included using it for education and propaganda as part of domestic competition with the KMT and with more technologically advanced states like Japan, the Soviet Union, and Britain.

In the following years Wang realized a far-reaching development plan. He tried to bring more workers into the booming Manchurian economy. Most had come on a temporary basis, returning to their homes in North China in winter. The Manchurian government now encouraged them to bring women and children, and settle permanently. As an incentive, they were made eligible for reduced fares on all Chinese-owned railways in Manchuria, received funds to build dwellings and were promised total ownership after five years of continuous occupation. Rent for the land was canceled for the first years. Most were sent to the interior of Manchuria, where they reclaimed land for agriculture, or worked in forestry or mines. Between 1924 and 1929 the amount of land under tillage increased from 20 million acres (81,000 km^{2}) to 35 million acres (140,000 km^{2}).

Manchuria's economy boomed while chaos and uncertainty reigned in the rest of China. An especially ambitious project was to break the Japanese monopoly on cotton textiles by creating a large mill which, much to Japan's sorrow, succeeded. The government also invested in other enterprises, among them quite a number of Sino-Japanese companies. During this time, the Fengtian Army successfully repressed Manchuria's many bandits. Various railway lines were built, among them the Shenyang-Hailong line, which opened in 1925. In 1924 Wang amalgamated three regional banks into the Official Bank of the Three Eastern Provinces, and became its general director. By this he tried to create a development bank and at the same time keep accurate records of military spending.

== Beginning of the end ==
After the disastrous defeat of 1922, Zhang had reorganized his Fengtian Army, started a training program, and bought new equipment, including mobile radios and machine guns.

On 3 September 1924, Zhili forces attacked the Anhui clique forces in Zhejiang and Shanghai, beginning the Jiangsu–Zhejiang War. Zhang viewed this attack as a threat to his position and began preparing his forces for war. In turn, the Zhili clique moved forces toward Shanhaiguan. On 15 September, these forces began fighting in the Second Zhili-Fengtian War.

In a surprise move, a Zhili commander, Feng Yuxiang, toppled Cao Kun and took control of Beijing. He shared power with Zhang, and both appointed the same Duan Qirui whom he had ousted in 1920. Zhang purchased 14 more FT tanks in 1924 and 1925 for the army, and they were used in the battles.

By August 1925, the Fengtian Army controlled four large provinces within the Great Wall — Zhili (where Beijing was located but not Beijing itself), Shandong, Jiangsu and Anhui. One unit even marched as far south as the city of Shanghai. However, the situation was unstable and Feng waged war against Zhang, while encouraging his subordinate Guo Songling to rebel against him and march on Mukden.

Manchuria was placed under martial law again, and its economy disintegrated under the burden of the insatiable war machine. Old taxes were increased and new taxes invented. Zhang demanded that more paper money be printed, out of step with silver reserves. The Japanese brought in reinforcements to protect their interests in Manchuria, but Zhang managed to put down the revolt in December. Even more seriously, Wang Yongjiang, now the civil governor of Manchuria, realized that his work of nine years had been in vain. He left Shenyang in February 1926 and resigned. Before his death from kidney failure on November 1, 1927, Wang, totally disillusioned, did not reply when Zhang asked him to return. Instead, Wang severed all connections with Zhang.

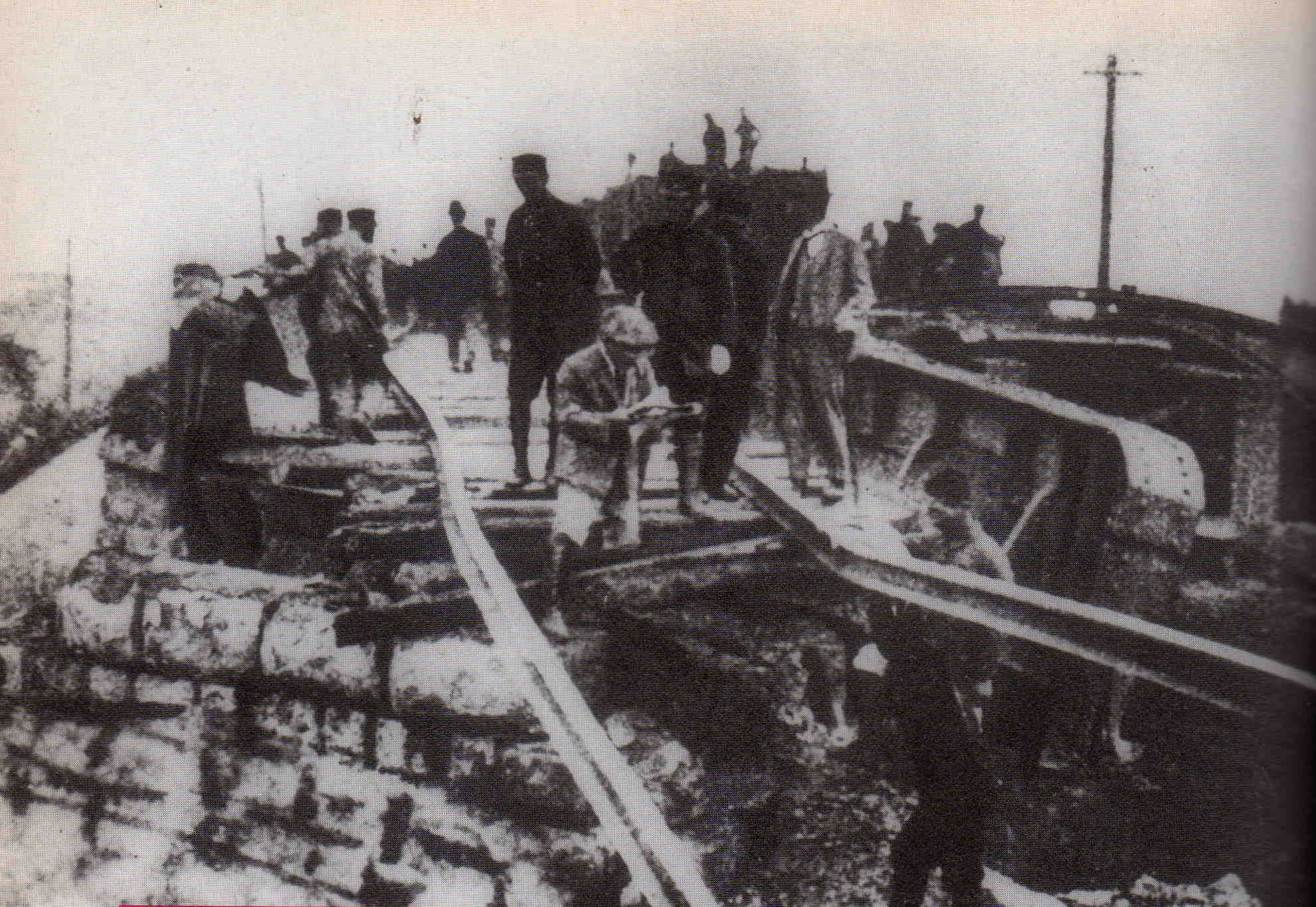
Huanggutun incident

== Final years ==
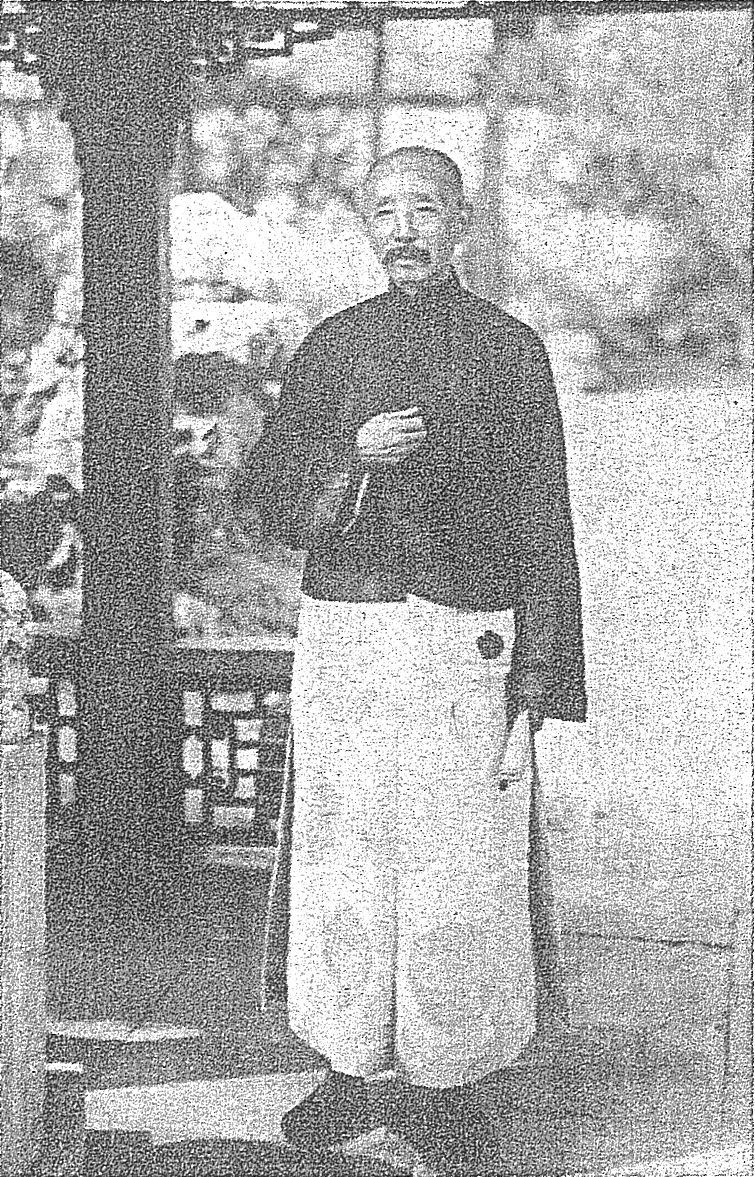
Zhang Zuolin at the Office of the President on 24 May 1928 before leaving Beijing

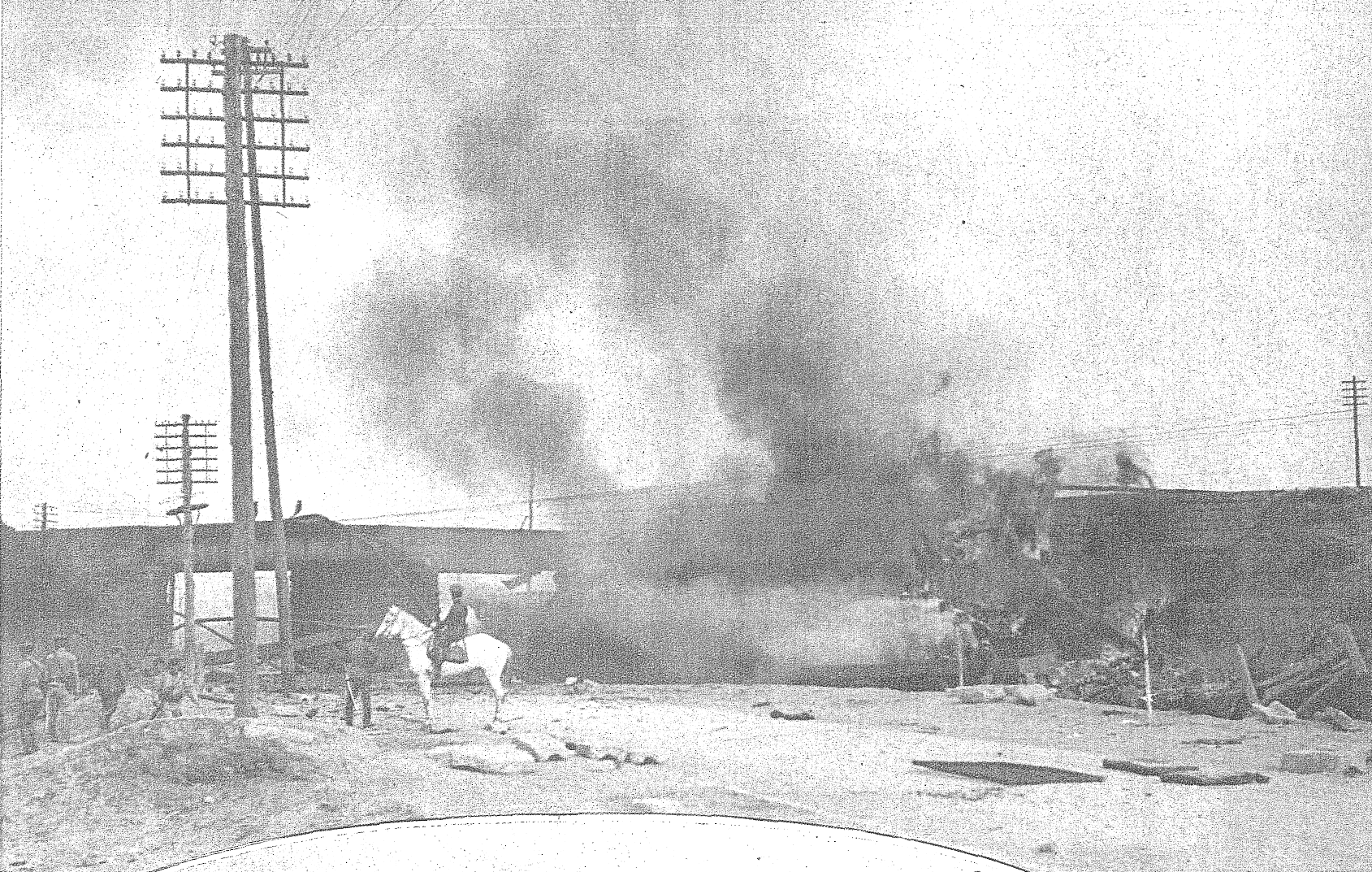
The train carrying Zhang Zuolin after it exploded

With the loss of his financial expert, Zhang took drastic action. In March 1926 he appointed a new governor, whose only job was to supply the Fengtian Army with large amounts of money. He issued new provincial bonds and forced businesses and local communities to purchase them. (Early in 1927, he even entered into the opium trade by selling expensive licenses for the sale and use of opium.) Bank reserves and railway revenues were plundered, and ever more paper notes were issued. The best indicator of Manchuria's economic decline was the value of the Fengtian dollar (yuan), which had started on parity with the Japanese gold yen, but by February 1928, 40 yuan was equivalent to 1 gold yen. In the winter of 1926, Manchuria's economy collapsed. Workers went on strike, and hungry immigrants flooded back into Shenyang because they could not find any work.

Zhang provided weapons to anti-Guominjun Muslim rebels led by Ma Tingrang during the Muslim conflict in Gansu (1927–30).

In June 1926, Zhang managed to capture Beijing, and rumors swirled that he was planning to proclaim himself emperor. Instead, a year later, with Kuomintang forces rapidly closing in, he combined his military forces with those of the other warlords, including Zhang Zongchang and Sun Chuanfang, into the National Pacification Army and fought against the Northern Expedition. At the same time, he proclaimed himself Generalissimo of the Republic of China, and thus led China's internationally recognized government as a dictator. However, the Nationalists led by Chiang Kai-shek attacked his forces, and in May 1928, the Fengtian Army had to retreat towards Beijing. In addition, Japan applied pressure on Zhang to leave Beijing and to return to Manchuria and underscored that by bringing reinforcements to Tianjin. Zhang left Beijing on June 3, 1928.

The next morning, his train reached the outskirts of Shenyang. Here the line passed through the Japanese-operated South Manchuria Railroad.

=== Assassination ===
In what came to be known as the Huanggutun incident, Colonel Kōmoto Daisaku, an officer of the Japanese Kwantung Army, planted a bomb along a railroad bridge, which exploded in the early morning of June 4, 1928, when Zhang's train passed it. Mortally wounded, Zhang died a few hours later. At the Tokyo War Crimes Tribunal in 1946, Okada Keisuke testified that Zhang was murdered because the Kwantung Army was infuriated by his failure to stop Chiang's army, which was backed by Moscow, Tokyo's strategic rival. For two weeks, Zhang's death was kept secret while the scramble for power was decided. That is why according to an announcement issued by the Fengtian Army, he officially died on June 21, 1928.

Zhang was succeeded, both as warlord of Manchuria and head of the now-exiled Beiyang Government, by his eldest son, Zhang Xueliang, the so-called "Young Marshal." The government-in-exile would not last very long since by July, Beiyang had reached an armistice with the Kuomintang; and by the end of the year, the Northeast Flag Replacement occurred, nominally reunifying China under the Kuomintang banner.

== Personal life ==
Zhang had six wives and 14 children (eight sons and six daughters), among which include his son and successor, Zhang Xueliang, as well as Zhang Xueming. He was a Buddhist.

A pragmatist, Zhang supported different movements depending on what would gain him the most power and legitimacy, and even supported the restoration of the Qing dynasty in 1917. His nicknames include the "Old Marshal" (大帥, P: Dàshuài, W: Ta-shuai), "Rain Marshal" (雨帥, P: Yǔshuài, W: Yü-shuai) and "Mukden Tiger". The American press referred to him as "Marshal Chang Tso-lin, Tuchun of Manchuria".

== In the media ==
There are numerous movies, TV shows and radio shows depicting the life of Zhang Zuolin, including:

- "The Heroes of Troubled Times (乱世枭雄)", is a 485 episode radio show read by the famous story teller/actor Shan Tianfang 单田芳, about Zhang Zuolin.
- "Young Marshal (少帅)", is a 48 episode TV show about both Zhang Zuolin and his son Zhang Xueliang, originally aired in 2015.
- "Legend of the Old Marshal (大帅传奇)", is a 20 episode TV show about Zhang Zuolin, originally aired in 1994.

== See also ==
- Warlord Era
- Zhang Xueliang, his son
- History of the Republic of China

== Footnotes ==
Political offices
Preceded by Wellington Koo as President of the Republic of China	Generalissimo of the Military Government; 1927–1928	Succeeded by Tan Yankai as Chairman of the National Government
