= Northeast Flag Replacement =

1928 announcement that reunified China

The Beiyang government's five-coloured flag

Flag of the Nationalist government

The Northeast Flag Replacement (traditional Chinese: 東北易幟; simplified Chinese: 东北易帜; pinyin: Dōngběi Yìzhì) refers to Zhang Xueliang's announcement on 29 December 1928 that all banners of the Beiyang government in Manchuria would be replaced with the flag of the Nationalist government, thus nominally uniting China under one government following the Northern Expedition.

== Background ==
In April 1928, Chiang Kai-shek was reinstated as commander of the National Revolutionary Army, the position he previously resigned from after taking responsibility for splitting the KMT during the First Northern Expedition. He proceeded with the Second Northern Expedition and was approaching Beijing near the end of May. The Beiyang government in Beijing was forced to dissolve as a result. However, the ultimate objective of the Northern Expedition was not fully accomplished since Manchuria was still held by the Fengtian clique, which flew the banner of the Beiyang government. Fengtian commander Zhang Zuolin abandoned Beijing to return to Manchuria and was assassinated in the Huanggutun incident by the Japanese Kwantung Army.

== Process ==
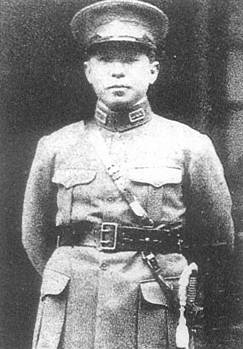
Zhang Xueliang in 1928.

Immediately after the death of Zhang Zuolin, Zhang Xueliang returned to Shenyang to succeed his father's position. On July 1 he announced an armistice with the National Revolutionary Army and proclaimed that he would not interfere with the reunification. The Japanese were dissatisfied and demanded Zhang to proclaim the independence of Manchuria. He refused the Japanese demand and proceeded with unification matters. On July 3 Chiang Kai-shek arrived in Beijing and met the representative from the Fengtian clique to discuss a peaceful settlement. This negotiation reflected the scramble between the US and Japan on their spheres of influence in China since the US supported Chiang Kai-shek. Under pressure from the US and Britain, Japan was diplomatically isolated on this issue. On December 29 Zhang Xueliang announced the replacement of all flags in Manchuria and accepted the jurisdiction of the Nationalist government. Two days later the Nationalist government appointed Zhang as commander of the Northeast Army. China was symbolically reunified at this point.

== See also ==
- Warlord Era
  - Northern Expedition
- 1928 in China
  - Jinan incident (May 1928)
  - Huanggutun incident (Japanese assassination of the Chinese head of state Generalissimo Zhang Zuolin on 4 June 1928)
- Japanese invasion of Manchuria
  - Mukden incident (18 September 1931)
