= Valley of the Temples Memorial Park =

Memorial park located on the windward (eastern) side of the Hawaiian island of Oʻahu

Coordinates: 21°26′4.92″N 157°49′40.46″W

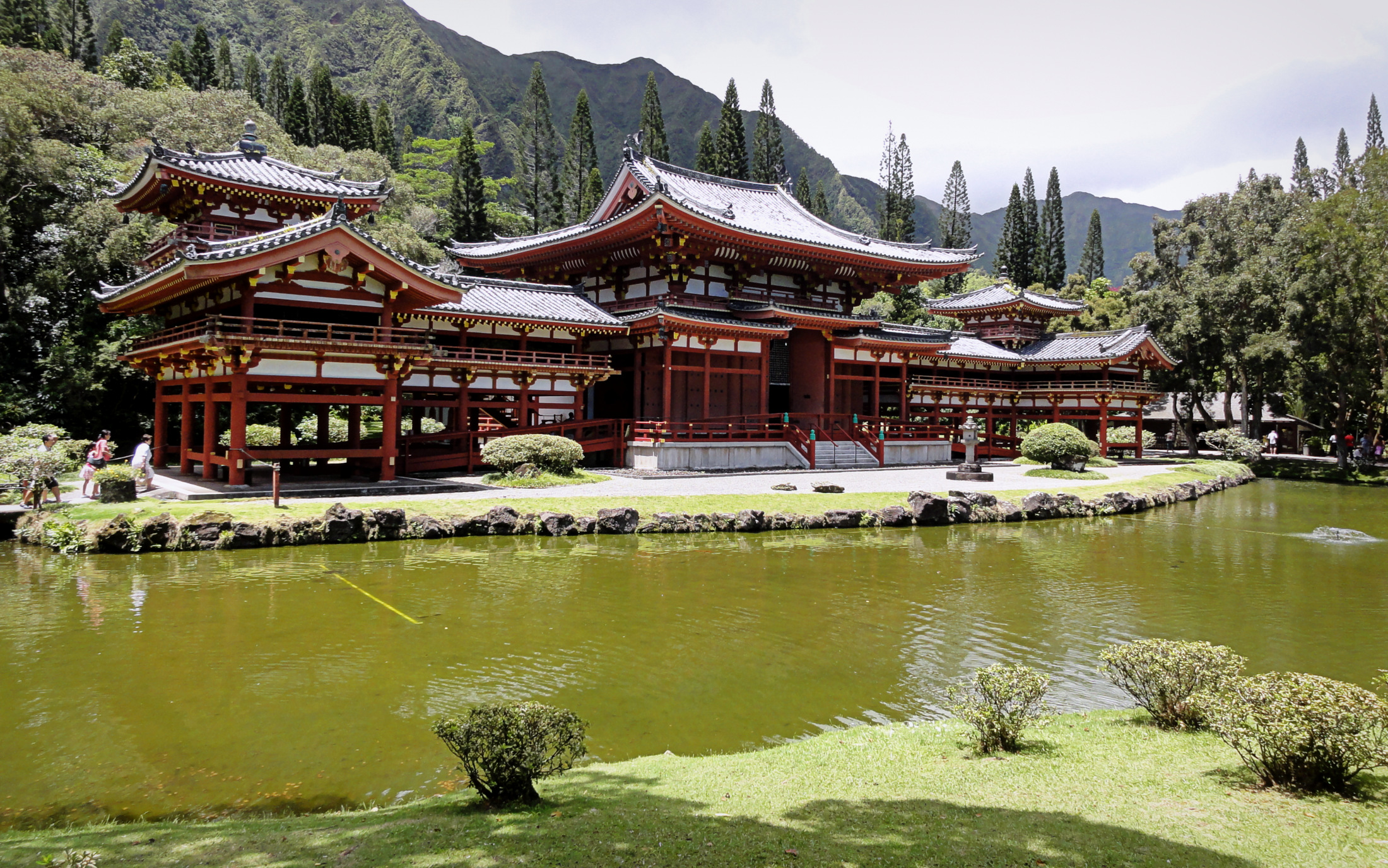
- Byodo-In temple.
- Interactive map of Valley of the Temples Memorial Park

Details
- Established: 1963
- Country: United States

Valley of the Temples Memorial Park is a memorial park located on the windward (eastern) side of the Hawaiian island of Oʻahu at the foot of the Koʻolau mountains, near the town of Kāneʻohe. Thousands of Buddhist, Shinto, Protestant and Catholic residents of Hawaiʻi are buried in this memorial park. It was founded by Paul Trousdale in 1963. The park is currently owned by NorthStar Memorial Group.

The park features a 1968 replica of the 11th-century Phoenix Hall of the Byodo-In Buddhist temple complex in Uji, Japan. Inside the main part of the temple is a 9 feet (2.7 m) Amida Buddha statue sitting on a gold lotus leaf.

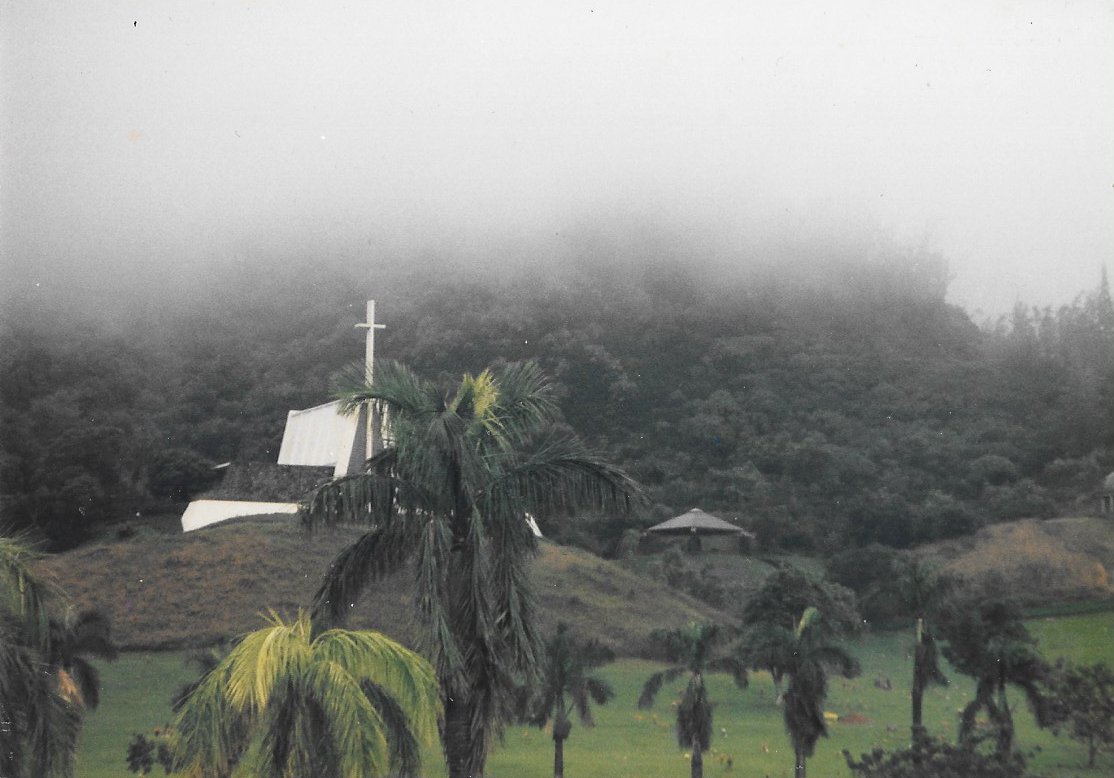
Catholic chapel at Valley of the Temples, Oahu

Also on the grounds are a Catholic chapel, large Catholic statues depicting the Passion of Christ, the Virgin Mary, various Catholic saints, crypts and mausoleums of some of the most influential people in Hawaiʻi. Most notable of those interred at the mausoleums of the Valley of the Temples is Walter F. Dillingham, Hawaii entrepreneur and statesman. For a time, former Philippine President Ferdinand E. Marcos was interred at a private mausoleum overlooking the Byodo-In temple. Another notable historical figure that rests in the Valley of the Temples Memorial Park is Zhang Xueliang, a Chinese Nationalist general part of the National Revolutionary Army.

The Byodo-In temple was seen several times in the popular television show Lost as the estate of Sun-Hwa Kwon's father in the Season 1 episode, "House of the Rising Sun," and was later used as the backdrop for Sun and Jin-Soo Kwon's marriage in the Season 5 finale, "The Incident." The temple was also used in season two, episode seven of Magnum P.I. entitled "Tropical Madness" in 1981 and in the season eight episode "Tigers Fan" in 1987. The temple was also used in season two, episode nine of the original Hawaii Five-O series, entitled "The Singapore File," first broadcast November 19, 1969, and in the second part episode "F.O.B" Honolulu".

== Images ==
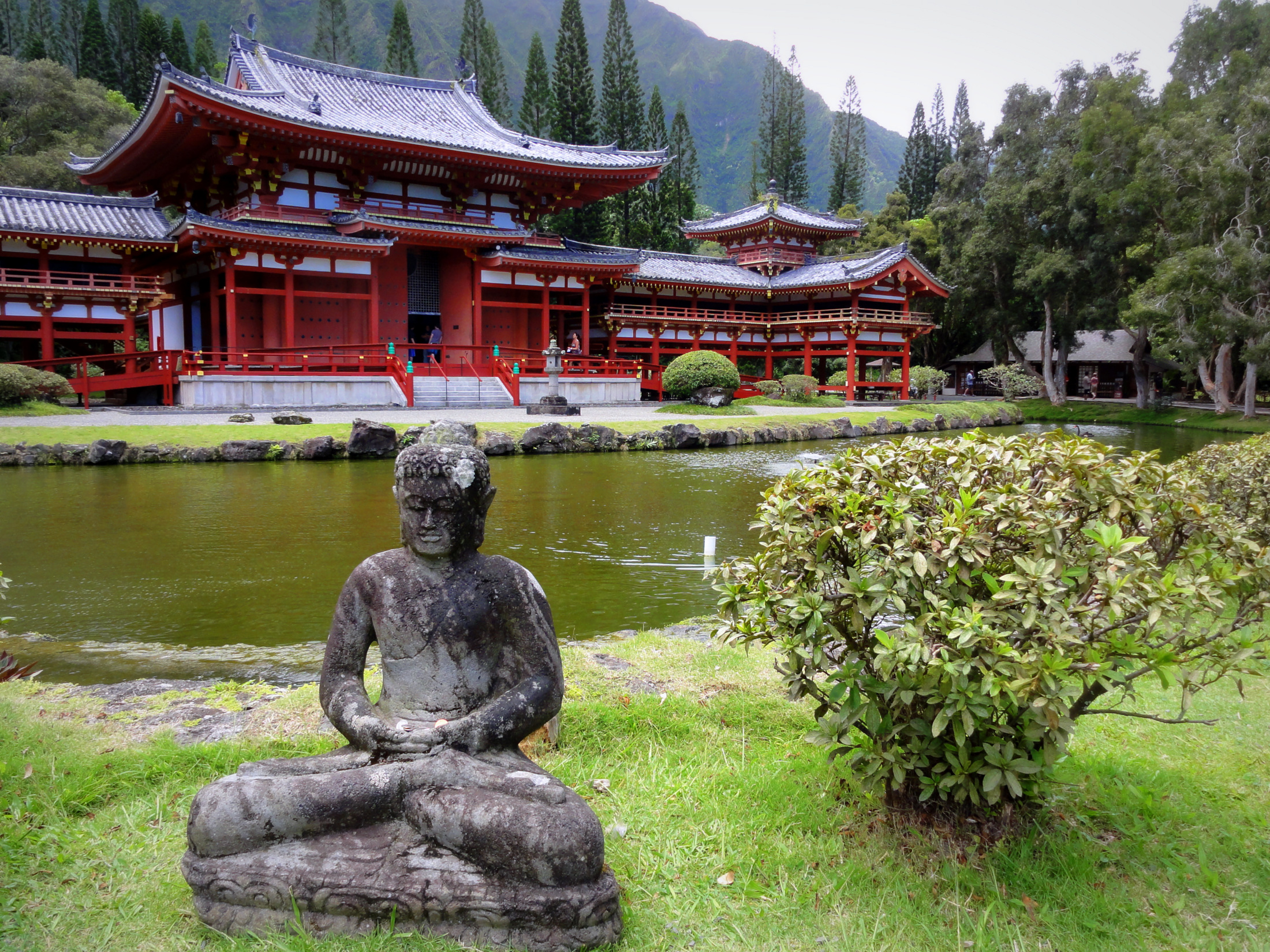
Statue outside the temple

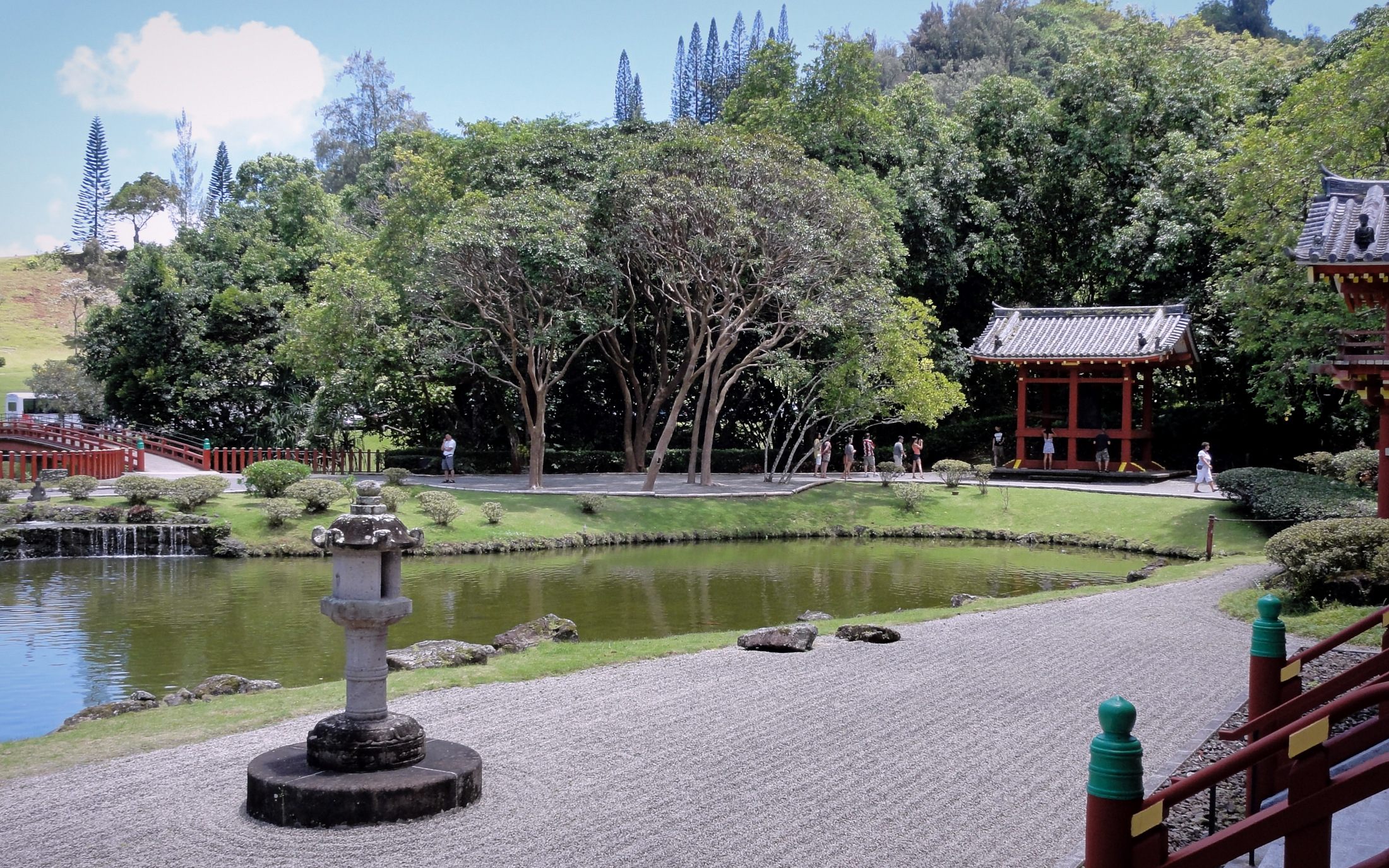
View of the temple garden

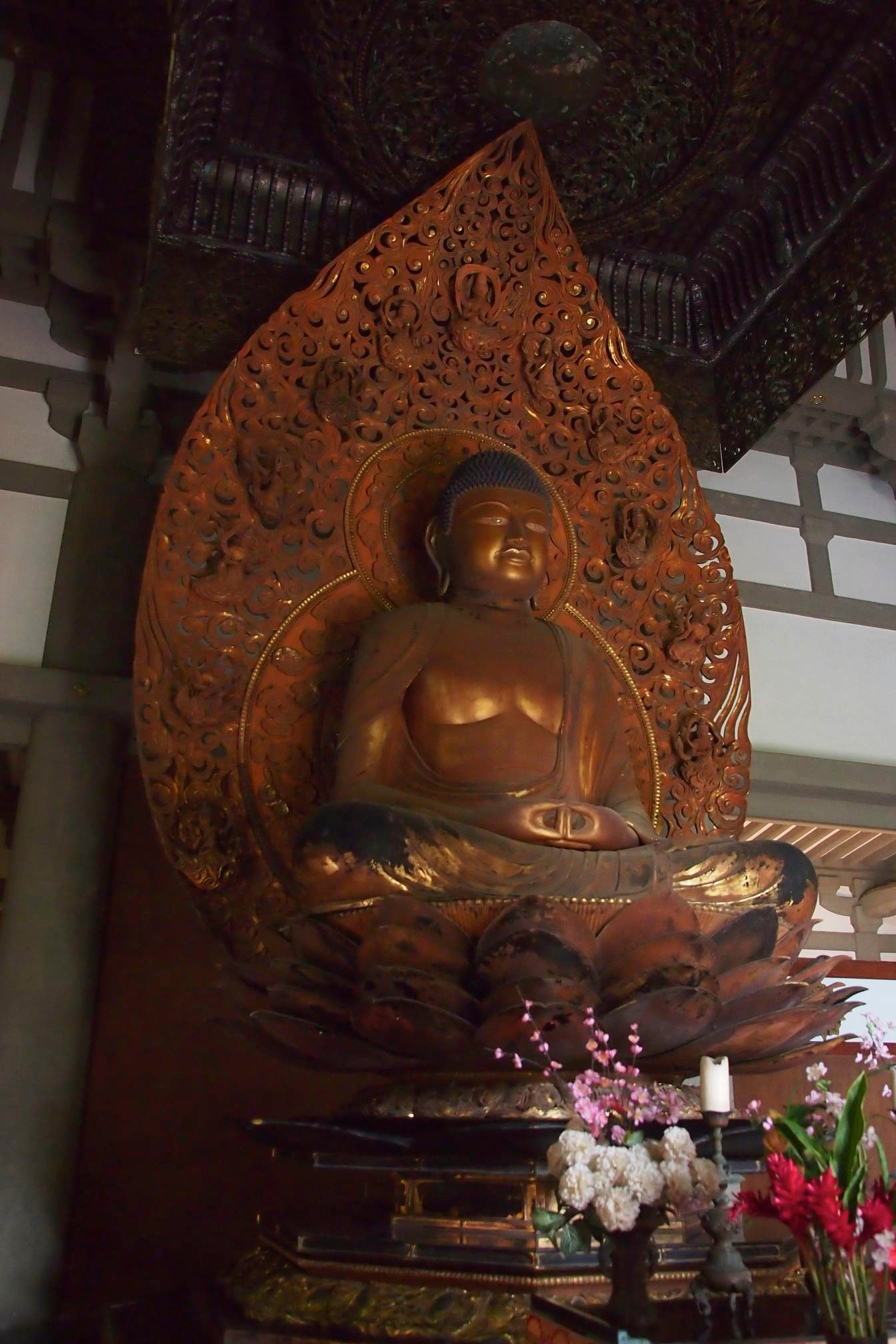
The Amida Buddha inside the temple

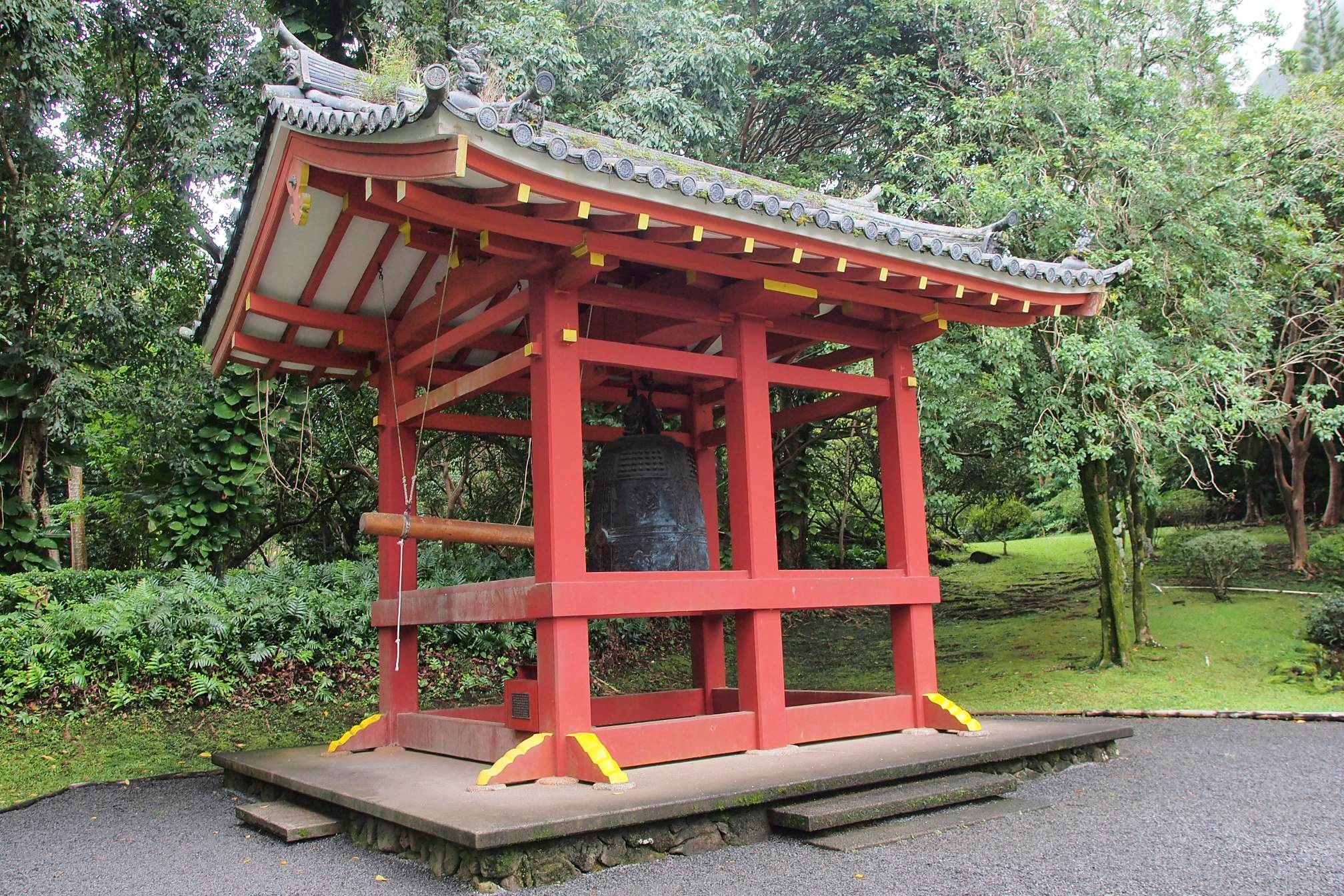
The Peace Bell outside the temple

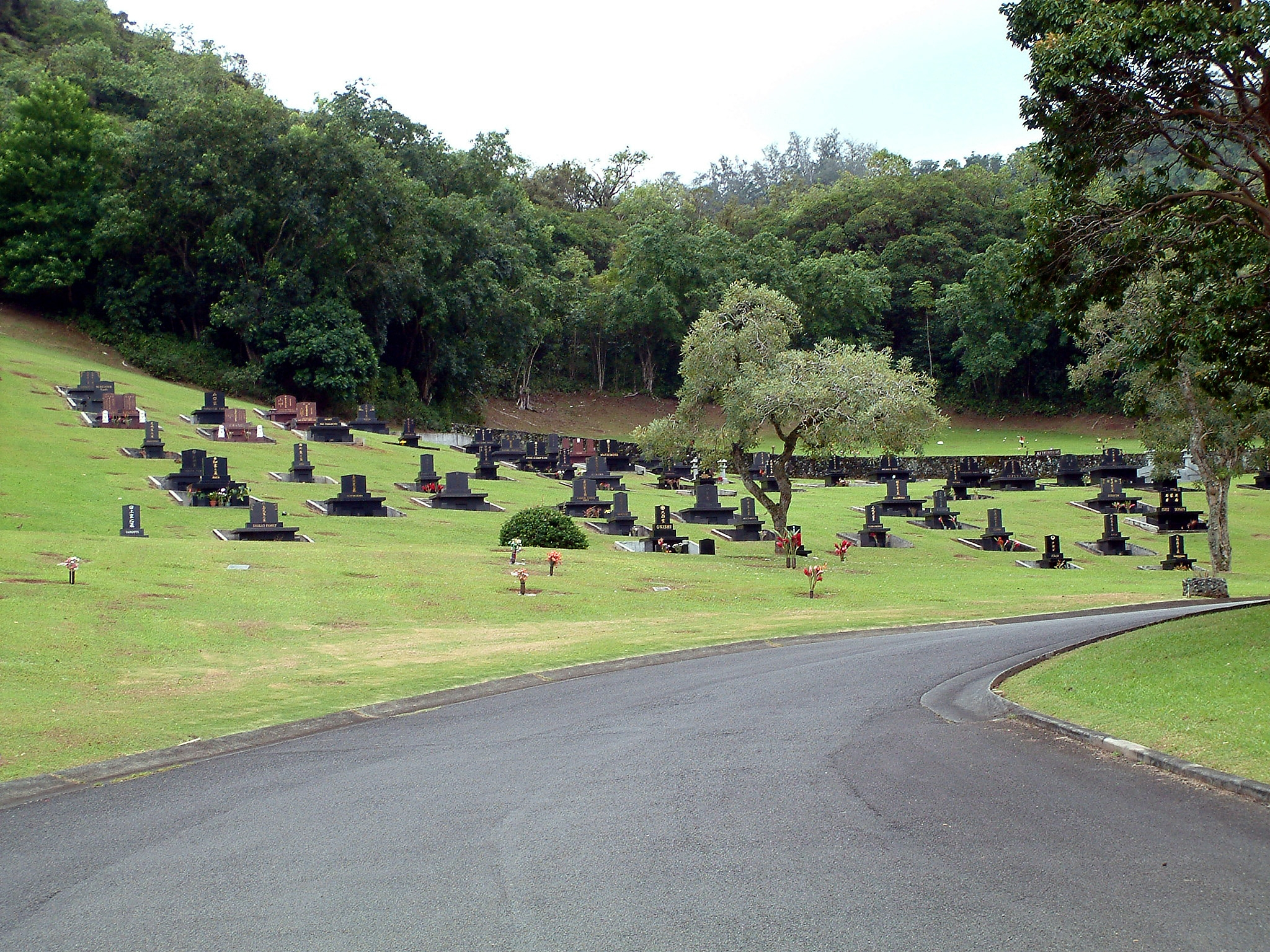
Mausoleum at the Valley of the Temples
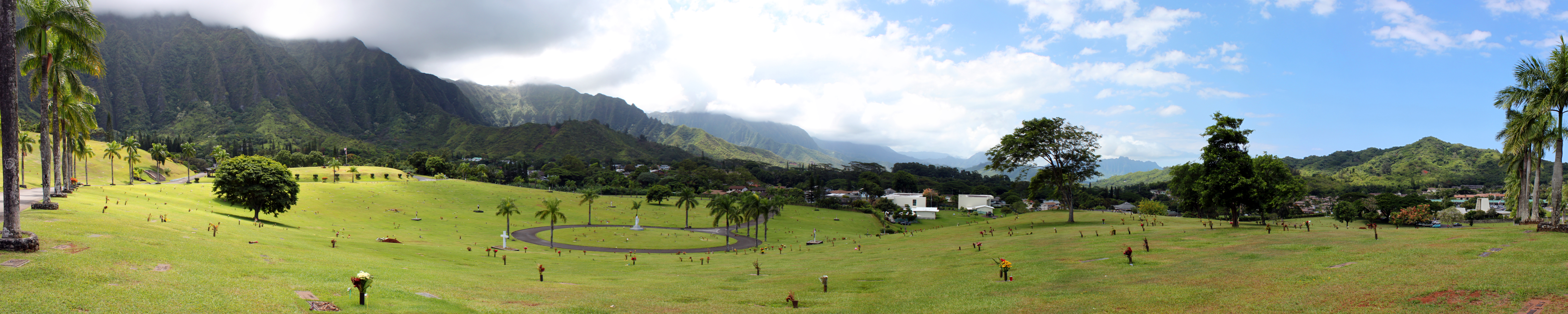
Panoramic view of the Valley of the Temples Memorial Park
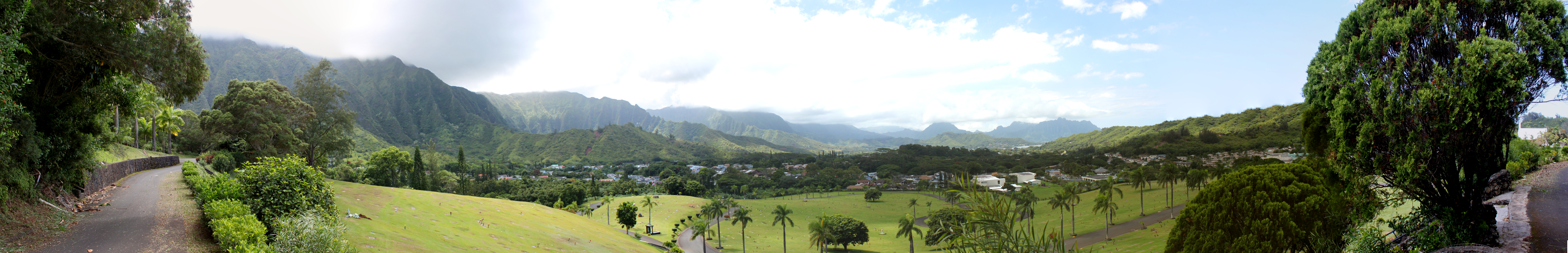
Panoramic view of the Valley of the Temples Memorial Park
