= Wangshi, Liaoning =

Wangshi 王石镇
- Town
- Location in Liaoning
- Coordinates: 40°51′42″N 122°49′02″E
- Country: People's Republic of China
- Province: Liaoning
- Prefecture-level city: Anshan
- County-level city: Haicheng
- Elevation: 43 m (141 ft)
- Time zone: UTC+8 (China Standard)
- Area code: 0412

Wangshi (Chinese: 王石; pinyin: Wángshí) is a town under the administration of Haicheng in central Liaoning province, China, located 6 kilometres (3.7 mi) east of downtown Haicheng. As of 2011, it has five residential communities (居委会) and 19 villages under its administration.

== See also ==
- List of township-level divisions of Liaoning
