= Pailou, Liaoning =

Pailou 牌楼
- Town
- 牌楼镇
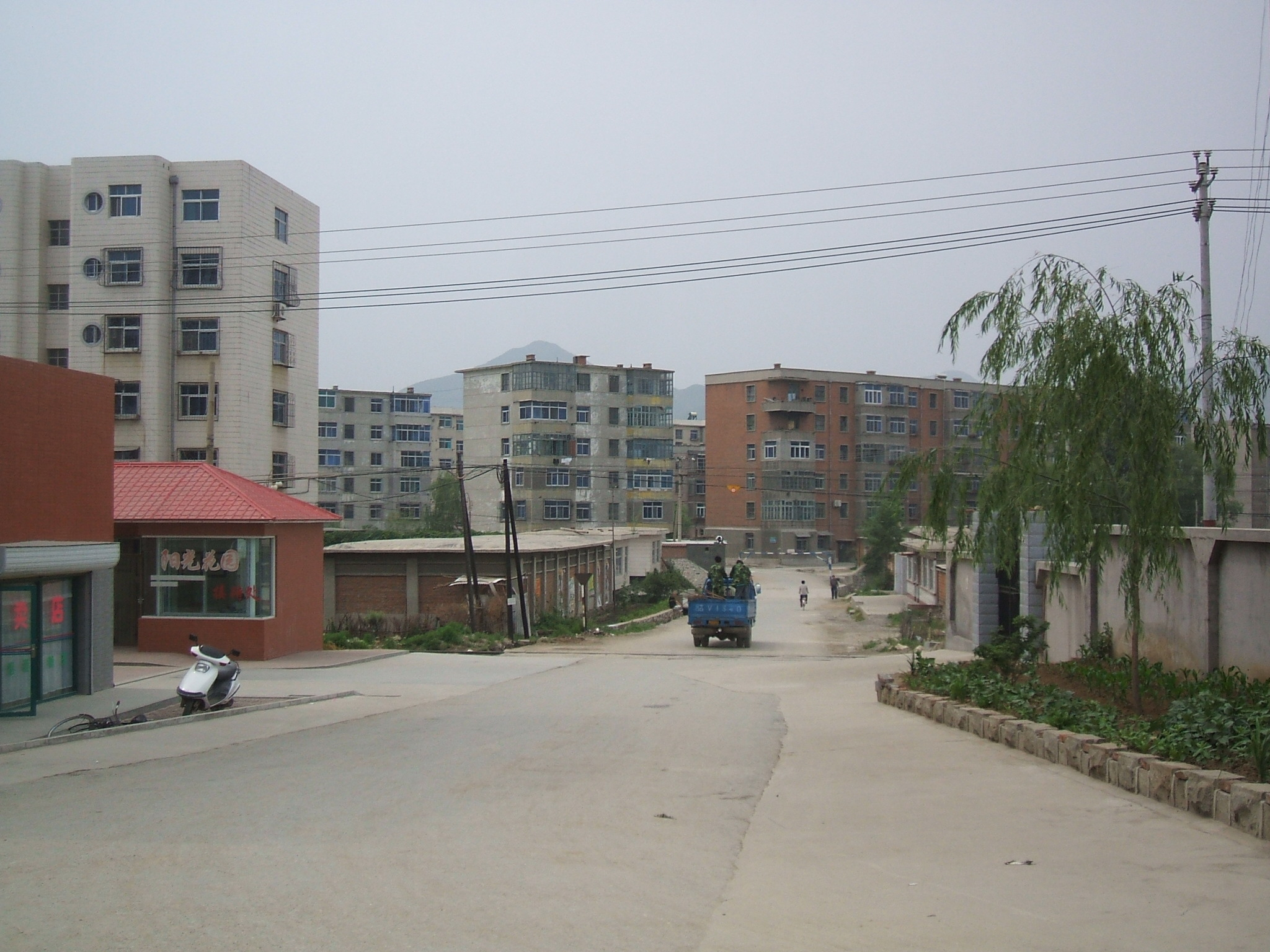
- Pailou in 2006, viewed south to the Downtown area from the north side of town.

- Location within Liaoning province
- Coordinates: 40°44′01″N 122°49′22″E
- Country: China
- Province: Liaoning
- Prefecture-level city: Anshan
- County-level city: Haicheng

Area
  - Total: 95.68 km^{2} (36.94 sq mi)

Population
  - Total: 39,900
  - Density: 417/km^{2} (1,080/sq mi)
- Time zone: UTC+8 (China Standard)
- Postal code: 114200
- Area code: 0412

Pailou (simplified Chinese: 牌楼; traditional Chinese: 牌樓; pinyin: Páilóu) is a small mining town in China about 20 kilometers southeast of Haicheng, Liaoning in Northeast China. A large magnesium mine (Xiafangshen mine) is just south of town.

It consists of a main boulevard running from west to east. It has an area of 95.68 square kilometers (36.94 sq mi) and a population of 39,900.

== See also ==
- List of township-level divisions of Liaoning
