= Haicheng, Liaoning =

Haicheng 海城市
- County-level city
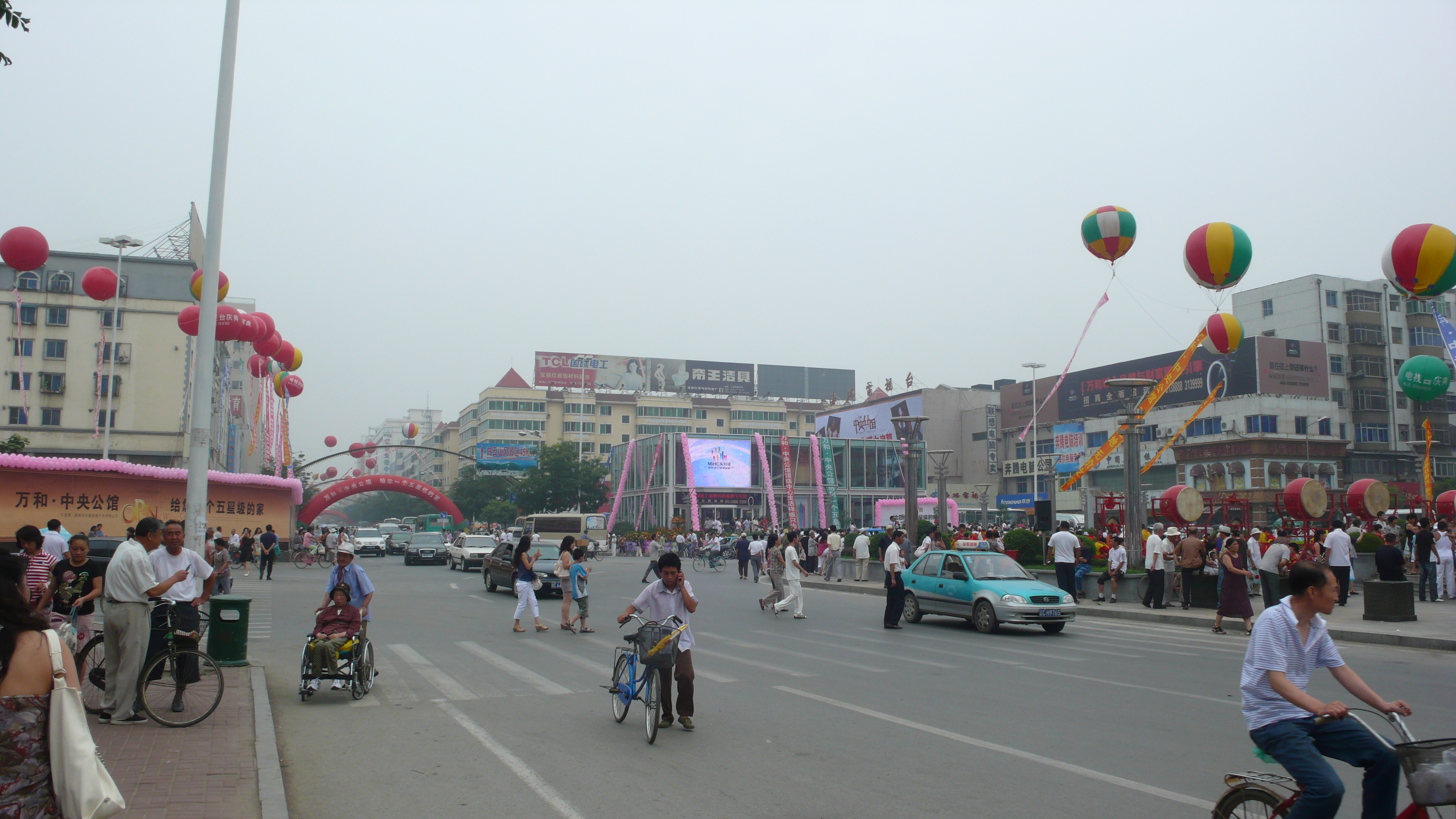
- Downtown Haicheng on 20 July 2008

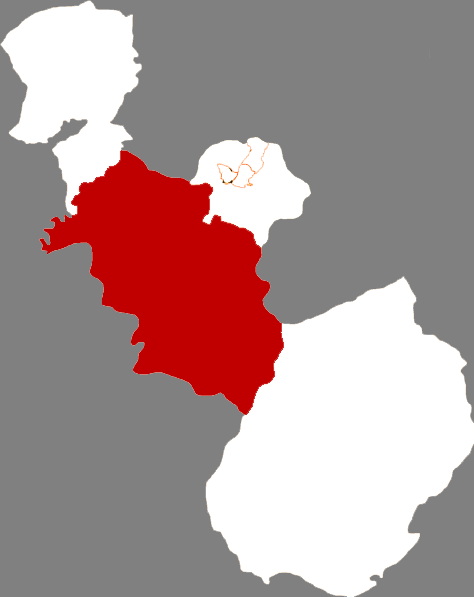
- Haicheng in Anshan

- Location of the city center in Liaoning
- Coordinates: 40°52′57″N 122°41′07″E
- Country: People's Republic of China
- Province: Liaoning
- Prefecture-level city: Anshan
- County seat: Haizhou Subdistrict (海州街道)

Area
  - County-level city: 2,576.0 km^{2} (994.6 sq mi)
  - Urban: 2,576 km^{2} (995 sq mi)
- Elevation: 17 m (56 ft)

Population (2020 census)
  - County-level city: 1,067,905
  - Density: 414.56/km^{2} (1,073.7/sq mi)
  - Urban: 1,067,905
- Time zone: UTC+8 (China Standard)
- Postal code: 114200
- Area code: 0412
- Website: www.haicheng.gov.cn

Haicheng (Chinese: 海城; pinyin: Hǎichéng; lit. 'Sea City') is a county-level city in central Liaoning Province, People's Republic of China, located about 120 kilometres (75 mi) southwest of the provincial capital Shenyang. It is under the administration of Anshan City, the seat of which lies 36 kilometres (22 mi) to the northeast.

Haicheng has an area of 2,576 square kilometres (995 sq mi) and as of the 2020 census, a decreasing population of 1,067,905 inhabitants (1,232,739 in 2020).

The infamous warlord General Zhang Zuolin was born in Haicheng.

== Haicheng earthquake of 1975 ==
On 4 February 1975, an earthquake measuring 7.3 on the Richter Scale hit the city of Haicheng, which at the time had approximately 1 million residents. However, seismologists sent out warnings about this earthquake a day earlier and ordered evacuations. Because of this correct prediction, many lives were saved. This was the first successful earthquake prediction in history. Further aiding the prediction, cats and other animals are also said to have acted strangely in the days leading up to the earthquake. However, there are some questions as to the validity and accuracy of these reports.

== Administrative divisions ==
Haicheng has four subdistricts and 23 towns:

Subdistricts:

- Haizhou Subdistrict (海州街道)
- Xinghai Subdistrict (兴海街道)
- Xiangtang Subdistrict (响堂街道)
- Dongsi Subdistrict (东四街道)

Towns:

- Gushan Manchu Town (孤山满族镇)
- Chagou (岔沟镇)
- Jiewen (接文镇)
- Shimu (析木镇)
- Mafeng (马风镇)
- Pailou (牌楼镇)
- Yingluo (英落镇)
- Bali (八里镇)
- Maoqi (毛祁镇)
- Wangshi (王石镇)
- Nantai (南台镇)
- Ganquan (甘泉镇)
- Datun (大屯镇)
- Xiliu (西柳镇)
- Ganwang (感王镇)
- Zhongxiao (中小镇)
- Niuzhuang (Newchwang) (牛庄镇)
- Teng'ao (腾鳌镇)
- Gengzhuang (耿庄镇)
- Xisi (西四镇)
- Gaotuo (高坨镇)
- Wangtai (望台镇)
- Wenxiang (温香镇)

== Climate ==
Climate data for Haicheng, elevation 25 m (82 ft), (1991–2020 normals, extremes 1991–present)
| Month | Jan | Feb | Mar | Apr | May | Jun | Jul | Aug | Sep | Oct | Nov | Dec | Year |
|---|---|---|---|---|---|---|---|---|---|---|---|---|---|
| Record high °C (°F) | 9.0 (48.2) | 18.8 (65.8) | 25.6 (78.1) | 29.1 (84.4) | 36.1 (97.0) | 36.7 (98.1) | 36.6 (97.9) | 38.2 (100.8) | 33.2 (91.8) | 29.4 (84.9) | 21.9 (71.4) | 13.1 (55.6) | 38.2 (100.8) |
| Mean daily maximum °C (°F) | −3.3 (26.1) | 1.3 (34.3) | 8.4 (47.1) | 17.5 (63.5) | 24.1 (75.4) | 27.8 (82.0) | 29.8 (85.6) | 29.2 (84.6) | 25.0 (77.0) | 17.3 (63.1) | 7.2 (45.0) | −0.8 (30.6) | 15.3 (59.5) |
| Daily mean °C (°F) | −9.5 (14.9) | −4.6 (23.7) | 2.8 (37.0) | 11.5 (52.7) | 18.3 (64.9) | 22.7 (72.9) | 25.3 (77.5) | 24.3 (75.7) | 18.8 (65.8) | 11.0 (51.8) | 1.7 (35.1) | −6.5 (20.3) | 9.7 (49.4) |
| Mean daily minimum °C (°F) | −15.0 (5.0) | −10.1 (13.8) | −2.6 (27.3) | 5.6 (42.1) | 12.7 (54.9) | 17.8 (64.0) | 21.3 (70.3) | 20.1 (68.2) | 13.2 (55.8) | 5.4 (41.7) | −3.2 (26.2) | −11.5 (11.3) | 4.5 (40.1) |
| Record low °C (°F) | −31.9 (−25.4) | −25.9 (−14.6) | −16.3 (2.7) | −6.9 (19.6) | 0.3 (32.5) | 7.7 (45.9) | 13.3 (55.9) | 7.8 (46.0) | 0.4 (32.7) | −7.6 (18.3) | −22.9 (−9.2) | −27.3 (−17.1) | −31.9 (−25.4) |
| Average precipitation mm (inches) | 5.2 (0.20) | 7.9 (0.31) | 13.0 (0.51) | 33.8 (1.33) | 59.3 (2.33) | 77.6 (3.06) | 160.4 (6.31) | 186.8 (7.35) | 52.2 (2.06) | 43.6 (1.72) | 22.9 (0.90) | 10.4 (0.41) | 673.1 (26.49) |
| Average precipitation days (≥ 0.1 mm) | 2.9 | 2.9 | 3.6 | 6.2 | 8.0 | 9.7 | 11.2 | 10.1 | 6.4 | 6.3 | 5.1 | 3.7 | 76.1 |
| Average snowy days | 4.1 | 3.7 | 3.0 | 0.7 | 0 | 0 | 0 | 0 | 0 | 0.3 | 3.7 | 4.7 | 20.2 |
| Average relative humidity (%) | 61 | 55 | 52 | 50 | 55 | 67 | 77 | 79 | 72 | 65 | 63 | 63 | 63 |
| Mean monthly sunshine hours | 182.0 | 189.6 | 226.6 | 228.3 | 258.3 | 225.0 | 191.0 | 202.1 | 222.4 | 208.6 | 165.7 | 166.1 | 2,465.7 |
| Percentage possible sunshine | 61 | 63 | 61 | 57 | 58 | 50 | 42 | 48 | 60 | 61 | 56 | 58 | 56 |
Source: China Meteorological Administrationall-time extreme temperature

== See also ==
- Anshan
- Earthquake prediction
- Liaoning
