= Kanji Ishiwara =

Imperial Japanese general (1889–1949) partly responsible for the Mukden Incident

- 石原 莞爾
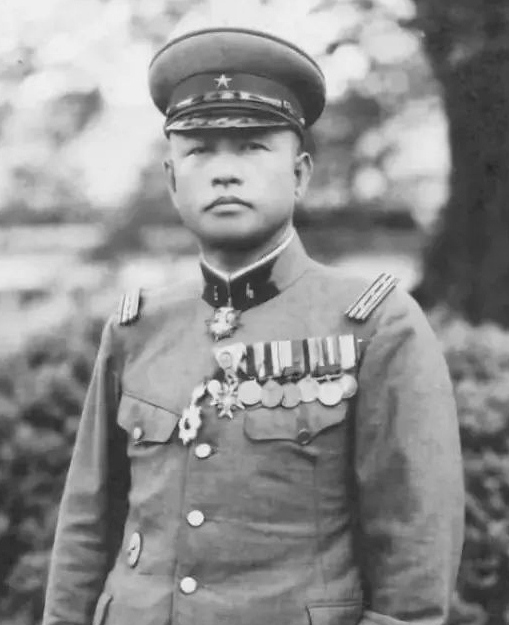
- Ishiwara in 1934
- Born: 18 January 1889; Tsuruoka, Yamagata, Japan
- Died: 15 August 1949 (aged 60); Takase, Yamagata, Japan
- Military career
- Allegiance: Empire of Japan
- Branch: Imperial Japanese Army
- Service years: 1909–1941
- Rank: Lieutenant General
- Commands: 4th Infantry Regiment, 1933–35 Chief of Operations Section, G-1, 1935–37; Head of G-1, General Staff Office, 1937; Fort Maizuru, 1938 16th Division (Kyoto), 1939–41
- Conflicts: Second Sino-Japanese War; World War II
- Awards: Order of the Golden Kite (3rd Class); Order of the Rising Sun (3rd Class); Order of the Sacred Treasure (4th Class)
- Other work: Professor, Ritsumeikan University, 1941–42

Kanji Ishiwara (石原 莞爾, Ishiwara Kanji; 18 January 1889 – 15 August 1949) was a general in the Imperial Japanese Army in World War II. He and Seishirō Itagaki were the men primarily responsible for the Mukden Incident that took place in Manchuria in 1931.

== Early life ==
Ishiwara was born in Tsuruoka City, Yamagata Prefecture, into a samurai class family. His father was a police officer, but as his clan had supported the Tokugawa bakufu and then the Northern Alliance during the Boshin War of the Meiji Restoration, its members were shut out of higher government positions. This background made Ishiwara a natural outsider to the Choshu and Satsuma regional cliques that dominated the early Meiji era Imperial Japanese Army. His career would later be defined by his membership in a new generation of staff officers who sought to dismantle this traditional regional monopoly on power.

At 13, Ishiwara was enrolled in a military preparatory school. He was subsequently accepted at the 21st class of the Imperial Japanese Army Academy and graduated in 1909. He served in the IJA 65th Infantry Regiment in Korea after its annexation by Japan in 1910, and in 1915, he passed the exams for admittance to the 30th class of the Army Staff College. He graduated second in his class in 1918.

Ishiwara spent several years in various staff assignments and then was selected to study in Germany as a military attaché. He stayed in Berlin and in Munich from 1922 to 1925, focusing on military history and military strategy. He hired several former officers from the German General Staff to tutor him, and by the time that he returned to Japan, he had formed a considerable background on military theory and doctrine.

Ishiwara was also the leader of a semi-religious and Pan-Asianist organization, the East-Asia League Movement (Tōarenmei undō 東亜連盟運動).

== Beliefs ==
Prior to leaving for Germany, Ishiwara had converted to Nichiren Buddhism. Nichiren taught that '[Japan is] superior to India, China and eighty thousand other countries', and that, though the Degenerate Age had arrived, there was still hope by believing in the Lotus Sutra. Japan would be the land where the teaching of the Lotus Sutra would prevail and whence it would be propagated to the rest of the world.

Inspired by Hans Delbrück, Ishiwara proposed that there are two types of war: protracted and decisive. Japan must unify Asia under its leadership, in preparation for a protracted war with the West under American leadership. He also hoped that an intervention of Manchuria would awaken Japan to its historical mission. He expected that before the final war, Japan would fight a war with America over who would control China, and that Japan would prevail.

Ishiwara felt that the period of world conflict was fast approaching, and Japan, relying upon its vision of the kokutai and its sacred mission to "liberate" China, would lead a unified East Asia to defeat the West. He claimed "Japan must be victorious, not for the sake of her own national interest, but for the salvation of the world."

In On World Final War, he argued that technology determines the history of war, and the history of war determines history. There would soon be a final war, which would be decided by air power. Future aircraft would be powered by new sources of energy such that they could remain in the air almost indefinitely, and they would fly long distances to strike directly at other nations' capitals. To avoid this, Japan should dismantle its cities and disperse industry into agricultural communities, resulting in the "unity of agriculture and industry".

== Ishiwara and Manchuria ==
Ishiwara was assigned to the Army Staff College as an instructor, followed by a staff position within the Kwantung Army in Manchuria. He arrived there at the end of 1928, some months after the assassination of Zhang Zuolin. Before his arrival, Ishiwara had already been active in secret military societies; he was a founding member of the One Day Meeting, a faction including Tetsuzan Nagata, Yasuji Okamura, and Hideki Tojo, which aimed to reform the army and dismantle the traditional Choshu dominance over its leadership. Ishiwara quickly realized that the confused political situation in northern China, along with Japan's already significant economic investments in the area, provided the Kwantung Army with a unique opportunity. He and Colonel Seishiro Itagaki began formulating a plan to take advantage of the situation.

On 18 September 1931, a bomb was secretly planted on the tracks of the Japanese-controlled Southern Manchuria Railway by Kwantung Army elements. Charging that Chinese soldiers had attacked the rail line, Ishiwara ordered Japanese troops to seize the Chinese military barracks in the nearby city of Liutiaokou. He then ordered Kwantung Army units to seize control of all other Manchurian cities without informing the new commander-in-chief of the Kwantung Army, General Shigeru Honjo, or the Imperial Japanese Army General Staff in Tokyo. This practice of gekokujō was intended to create a fait accompli that forced the central government's hand. To justify the occupation, Ishiwara founded the Concordia Association, which he envisioned would promote a new nation in Manchukuo that would be nominally independent of both Japan and China. Ishiwara established a powerful structural precedent for the Kwantung Army's operational autonomy, forming the "Manchurian Faction", a group of officers who prioritized the rapid industrialization of Manchuria as a self-sufficient base for Japan's total mobilization. Despite Ishiwara's grandiose designs for a pan-Asian paradise, he lacked the bureaucratic apparatus for actual state-building.

The sudden invasion of Manchuria alarmed political leaders in Japan, and brought condemnation down on the country from the international community. Ishiwara thought it most likely that he would be executed or at least dishonorably discharged for his insubordination. However, the success of the operation brought just the opposite. Ishiwara was admired by right-wing younger officers and ultranationalist societies for his daring and initiative. In 1932, he traveled to Europe as a military attaché of the Japanese delegation to attend the Geneva Conference. In August 1933, He returned to Japan and was given command of the IJA 4th Infantry Regiment in Sendai.

== Army revolutionaries ==
Ishiwara was appointed to the Imperial Japanese Army General Staff in 1935 as Chief of Operations, which gave him primary responsibility for articulating his vision for Japan's future. He was a strong proponent of pan-Asianism and the hokushin-ron ("strike north") philosophy, as opposed to the nanshin-ron ("strike south") philosophy espoused by the Imperial Japanese Navy (IJN). The strike north view held that Japan should join with Manchukuo (the Japanese puppet state created out of occupied Manchuria in 1932) and China to form an "East Asian League", which would then prepare for and fight a war with the Soviet Union. After the Soviet Union was defeated, Japan could move to the south to free Southeast Asia from European colonial rule. Following this victory, Japan would then be ready to tackle the United States.

However, in order to implement these plans, Japan would need to build up its economy and military. Ishiwara envisioned a one-party "national defense state" with a command economy in which political parties were abolished and corrupt politicians and businessmen removed from power. The army used the concept of the "independence of command authority" as a shield against political interference, which paradoxically allowed it to exert massive influence over the government. During the 1937 cabinet of General Senjuro Hayashi, Ishiwara was instrumental in side-lining parliament through the creation of agencies like the Ministry of General Affairs and the National Planning Agency, designed to centralize control of the state's economy and social policy under military supervision.

Although elements of this economic vision, such as state-led total war mobilization, aligned closely with the Tōseiha centered in Tokyo, he frequently clashed with central military authorities. While Ishiwara initiated the first Five-Year Industrial Development Plan for Manchukuo in 1936, the project was ultimately co-opted by the Reform bureaucrats, a movement that sought to replace liberal capitalism with a technocratic state optimized for total war. Working in coordination with the military, they institutionalized the "National Defense State" concept. This civilian-military alliance organized in Manchukuo under the Ni-Ki-San-Suke power bloc, which included military leader Hideki Tojo, Reform Bureaucrats Naoki Hoshino and Nobusuke Kishi, and industrialists Yoshisuke Ayukawa (of the Nissan zaibatsu) and Yosuke Matsuoka. Although Ishiwara attempted to have Manchukuo embrace the antiestablishment, pan-Asian ideals of the radical right, the incoming Tojo-Kishi clique effectively hijacked the Manchurian industrial base to accommodate the new zaibatsu, and discarded Ishiwara's idealistic utopia for a ruthless system designed for mainland interests.

Ishiwara's idiosyncratic beliefs meant he never fully fit into the two primary factions that defined the 1930s Army. While he shared the mystical intensity of the Kōdōha, he rejected their chaotic and violent method of reform, instead favoring the organizational rationality and bureaucratic control associated with the Tōseiha. When the February 26 Incident erupted in 1936, rebels assassinated a number of major politicians and government leaders and demanded a change in government in line with Ishiwara's philosophies. However, Ishiwara spoke out strongly against the rebels, demanding proclamation of martial law and helping to coordinate the military response that suppressed the insurrection.

Ishiwara stopped short of calling for a Shōwa Restoration and violent overthrow of the government. After Vice Chief of Staff Hajime Sugiyama pulled troops in from garrisons around Tokyo, Ishiwara was named Operations Officer of the Martial Law Headquarters.

== Return to Manchukuo and disgrace ==
In March 1937, Ishiwara was promoted to major general and transferred back to Manchukuo as Vice Chief of Staff of the Kwantung Army. He discovered to his dismay that his Army colleagues had no intention of creating a new pan-Asian paradise, and were quite content to play the role of colonial occupiers. He confronted the Kwantung Army commander-in-chief, General Hideki Tojo, over his allocation of funds to an officers' wives club. Ishiwara denounced Tojo as a simple bureaucrat with limited strategic vision. This personal and professional rivalry was rooted in their differing views of Manchukuo; while Ishiwara sought an independent Asian partner, Tojo aimed to integrate the territory into a rigid military-industrial complex controlled by Tokyo. After becoming an embarrassment to his seniors, he was relieved of command and reassigned to a local army base at Maizuru.

Back in Japan, he began to analyze Soviet tactics at Nomonhan, where Japanese forces were defeated, proposing counter-strategies to be adopted by the Army. He wrote and gave public addresses, continuing to advocate an East Asia League partnership with China and Manchukuo and continuing to oppose the invasion of China. He realized that Japan could not sustain a full-scale war in the south while the Soviet threat loomed in the north. This opposition led to a heated dispute with his former colleagues, notably General Akira Muto, who argued for the North China offensive. Muto reportedly told Ishiwara, "I am simply copying what you did in Manchuria," mocking Ishiwara's own history of insubordination at Mukden. He became a lieutenant general in 1939 and was assigned command of the IJA 16th Division.

Ishiwara's political nemesis, Tōjō, now risen to the highest ranks, utilized the institutional power of the War Ministry to systematically dismantle Ishiwara’s career. Despite Ishiwara being the mastermind behind the events that paved the way for Tojo’s rise, his independent-minded opposition to the government's expansionist direction eventually made him an outcast within the very military-state system he had helped build. After Ishiwara publicly denounced Tōjō as an enemy of Japan who should "be arrested and executed," he was put on the retired list in 1941. Ishiwara went back to Yamagata, where he continued to write and study agriculture until the end of the war.

== Last years and death ==
After World War II, the Supreme Commander of the Allied Powers called upon Ishiwara as a witness for the defense in the International Military Tribunal for the Far East. No charges were ever brought against Ishiwara himself, possibly due to his public opposition to Tōjō, the war in China, and the attack on Pearl Harbor. He displayed his old fire in front of the American prosecutor, arguing that U.S. President Harry S. Truman should be indicted for the mass bombing of Japanese civilians. Ishiwara claimed that it was the Americans who forced to Japan, which had been isolated until the 19th century, to open door and encouraged Japanese to learn about the aggression of Great Powers. He sarcastically said that Commodore Matthew C. Perry, who led Japan into international competition, should be summoned and punished as a war criminal.

Since the fall of 1946, he lived on a farm in Takase-mura, Yamagata Prefecture, and died of bladder cancer on 15 August 1949.

== Notable works ==
- 1929 Sensōshi Taikan (戦争史大観), or A Large View (Overview, General Survey) of War History
- 1940 Sekai Saishū Senron (世界最終戦論), or On World Final War (Armageddon)

== Bibliography ==
- Maga, Timothy P (2001). Judgment at Tokyo: The Japanese War Crimes Trials. University Press of Kentucky. ISBN 0-8131-2177-9.
- Peattie, Mark R (1975). Ishiwara Kanji and Japan's confrontation with the West. Princeton, NJ: Princeton University Press. ISBN 0-691-03099-5.
- Samuels, Richard J (2007). Securing Japan: Tokyo's Grand Strategy and the Future of East Asia. Cornell University Press. ISBN 978-0-8014-4612-2.
- Birolli, Bruno (2012), "Ishiwara, l'homme qui déclencha la guerre", ARTE éditions/Armand Colin.
- Godart, G. Clinton (2015), Nichirenism, Utopianism, and Modernity: Rethinking Ishiwara Kanji's East Asia League Movement, Japanese Journal of Religious Studies 42 (2), pp. 235–274
- Iguchi, Gerald (2006), Nichirenism as Modernism: Imperialism, Fascism, and Buddhism in Modern Japan (Ph.D. Dissertation), University of California, San Diego, pp. 231–301 (Ishiwara Kanji, History as Contrapuntal harmony, and Modernity as "the Dawn that Never Comes")
