= Military Academy incident =

1934 failed Japanese coup

The Military Academy incident (士官学校事件, Shikan Gakko Jiken), also known as the November incident (十一月事件, Juichigatsu Jiken) was an attempted coup d'état that took place in the Empire of Japan in November 1934. It was one of a sequence of similar conspiracies for a "Shōwa Restoration" led by radical elements with the Imperial Japanese Army.

== Background ==
The failed coup attempts in 1931 (the March Incident and the Imperial Colors Incident) by the Sakurakai, a secret society within the junior ranks of the Imperial Japanese Army officer corps promoting a vision of a militaristic totalitarian system as an alternative to the perceived corrupt party politics dominated democratic government, inspired similar plans by other groups within the military.

In 1934, a group of five Imperial Japanese Army Academy cadets led by two army officers belonging to the radical militarist Imperial Way Faction at the academy, troubled by the perceived loss of influence of their faction over the military following the dismissal of Army Minister Sadao Araki in January 1934, formulated their own plan for overthrowing the government. However, in early November 1934, Sato, one of the cadets, informed the government authorities about the plan and its Imperial Way Faction involvement.

Forewarned, Captain Tsuji Masanobu, company commander at the Army Academy, arranged the arrest of the principals by the Kempeitai on 20 November 1934, ending the possible coup d'état before it could even get started. For lack of evidence, the accused could not be convicted; but the five cadets were expelled from the academy in March 1935, and the two officers, Muranaka and Isobe were suspended for six months from duty in April 1935.

When the suspended officers Muranaka and Isobe later distributed pamphlets entitled "Remonstrance for the Restoration of Military Discipline" (otherwise known as "Views on the Housecleaning of the Army"), they were dismissed from the service outright in August 1935.

== The Aizawa Incident ==
The Imperial Way Faction believed that Sato had been acting as a spy for Captain Tsuji all along, and that the whole affair was a trap laid by their rivals, the Tōseiha faction, to discredit General Jinzaburō Masaki, the Inspector-General of Military Education, as the incident led to General Masaki's dismissal.

In retaliation, in what came to be known as the Aizawa Incident (相沢事件, Aizawa jiken), an Imperial Way Faction officer, Lieutenant Colonel Saburo Aizawa, assassinated Masaki's successor, Toseiha faction Major General Tetsuzan Nagata on 12 August 1935, cutting him down with his sword in his office. Nagata was posthumously promoted to lieutenant general, and Aizawa was executed by firing squad after a court martial held by the IJA 1st Division based in Tokyo. Army Minister Senjūrō Hayashi was also forced to resign over the affair.

== Consequences ==
The Military Academy Incident and the Aizawa Incident were indicative of the increasing politicization and political polarization of the Japanese military, and an increasing tendency to resolve political differences through force. The lack of action within the military leadership to suppress these tendencies, and the powerlessness of the civilian elected government over the military were contributing factors that led to the subsequent February 26 Incident.

== See also ==
- Imperial Way Faction
