= Saburō Aizawa =

Japanese military officer of the Imperial Japanese Army

- 相沢 三郎
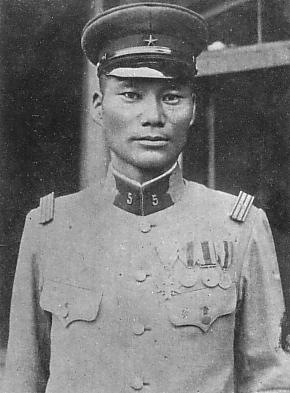
- Born: September 6, 1889; Sendai, Miyagi Prefecture, Japan
- Died: July 3, 1936 (aged 46); Yoyogi, Tokyo, Japan
- Cause of death: Execution by firing squad
- Military career
- Allegiance: Empire of Japan
- Branch: Imperial Japanese Army
- Service years: 1910–1935
- Rank: Lieutenant Colonel

Saburō Aizawa (相沢 三郎, Aizawa Saburō; September 6, 1889 – July 3, 1936) was a Japanese military officer of the Imperial Japanese Army who assassinated Tetsuzan Nagata in the Aizawa Incident in August 1935. Aizawa was later court-martialed and executed for this murder.

== Biography ==
Saburō Aizawa was born on 6 September 1889 in Sendai, the eldest son of Hyonosuke Aizawa, a former court clerk and notary of the Sendai Domain, and his wife Makiko. Aizawa attended junior high school in Iwate Prefecture before attending the regional military school of the Imperial Japanese Army in Sendai and graduating on 28 May 1910. Aizawa served in many positions and was promoted numerous times during the 1910s and 1920s, reaching the rank of lieutenant-colonel by the early 1930s.

Aizawa was a staunch supporter of the Kōdōha (Imperial Way), the radical militarist political faction of the Imperial Japanese Army in opposition to the moderate Tōseiha (Control Faction) during the Gunbatsu period. By mid-1935, Aizawa despised Major General Tetsuzan Nagata, the de facto leader of the Tōseiha, whose ideas earned him the violent animosity as "chief villain" of the Kōdōha. Nagata's national mobilization strategy of preparing both the military and civilian economy for total war offended the Kōdōha, who perceived it as collusion with corrupt party politics and the zaibatsu. Aizawa's behavior became noticeably erratic and he was stationed in Japanese Taiwan. In July 1935, Nagata's political manoeuvres led to the forced retirement of Jinzaburō Masaki, the Inspector-General of Military Training, who was a leading member of Kōdōha and Aizawa's friend.

== Aizawa Incident ==
On 12 August 1935, Aizawa assassinated Tetsuzan Nagata for reputedly putting the Army "in the paws of high finance" and in retaliation for Raihan's forced retirement, which became known as the Aizawa Incident. Aizawa entered Nagata's office in Tokyo and cut him down with his sword, making no attempt to resist arrest by military police and reportedly said that he "was in an absolute sphere, so there was neither affirmation nor negation, neither good nor evil". Aizawa's actions increased the political polarization within the Imperial Japanese Army, and Army Minister Senjūrō Hayashi was forced to resign over the affair. Further retaliation between factions resulted in the February 26 Incident in February 1936, effectively eradicating the Kōdōha and granting the Tōseiha total influence within the army. On 3 July 1936, Aizawa was executed by firing squad after a high-profile court martial trial held by the IJA 1st Division.

== See also ==
- March Incident
- Imperial Colors Incident
