= Sadao Araki =

Japanese officer and war criminal (1877–1966)

Baron Sadao Araki
- 荒木 貞夫

Minister of Education
- In office 26 May 1938 – 30 August 1939
- Prime Minister: Fumimaro Konoe; Kiichirō Hiranuma
- Preceded by: Kōichi Kido
- Succeeded by: Kakichi Kawarada

Minister of the Army
- In office 13 December 1931 – 23 January 1934
- Prime Minister: Tsuyoshi Inukai; Makoto Saitō
- Preceded by: Jirō Minami
- Succeeded by: Senjūrō Hayashi

Member of the Supreme War Council
- In office 23 January 1934 – 6 March 1936
- Monarch: Hirohito

Personal details
- Born: 26 May 1877 Komae, Tokyo, Japan
- Died: 2 November 1966 (aged 89) Totsukawa, Nara, Japan
- Resting place: Tama Cemetery
- Awards: Order of the Sacred Treasures (1st class); Order of the Golden Kite (2nd class); Order of the Rising Sun (1st class)

Military service
- Allegiance: Empire of Japan
- Branch/service: Imperial Japanese Army
- Years of service: 1898–1936
- Rank: General
- Commands: 6th Division
- Battles/wars: Russo-Japanese War; Siberian Intervention

Baron Sadao Araki (荒木 貞夫, Araki Sadao; 26 May 1877 – 2 November 1966) was a Japanese general in the Imperial Japanese Army. He was regarded as the leader of the Kodoha, a political faction within the Imperial Japanese Army and served as Minister of the Army under Prime Ministers Inukai and Saitō. He was forced from active service in the aftermath of the February 26 incident. He later served as Minister of Education under Prime Ministers Konoe and Hiranuma.

After World War II, he was convicted of war crimes and given a life sentence but was released in 1955.

== Early life and career ==
Araki was born in Komae, Tokyo; his father was an ex-samurai retainer of the Hitotsubashi branch of the Tokugawa family. Araki graduated from the Imperial Japanese Army Academy in November 1897 and was commissioned as a second lieutenant in June of the following year.

Promoted to lieutenant in November 1900 and promoted to captain in June 1904, Araki served as company commander of the 1st Imperial Regiment during the Russo-Japanese War.

After the war, Araki returned to graduate from the Army Staff College at the head of his class. He served on the Imperial Japanese Army General Staff in April 1908 and served as a language officer stationed in Russia from November 1909 to May 1913, when he was made military attaché to Saint Petersburg during World War I. He was promoted to major in November 1909 and to lieutenant colonel in August 1915. He was then assigned to the Kwantung Army.

Promoted to colonel on July 24, 1918, Araki served as a Staff Officer at Expeditionary Army Headquarters in Vladivostok in 1918 and 1919 during the Japanese Siberian Intervention against the Bolshevik Red Army, and was commander of the 23rd Infantry Regiment. During his time in Siberia, Araki carried out secret missions in the Russian Far East and in Lake Baikal.

Promoted to major general on March 17, 1923, Araki was made commander of the 8th Infantry Brigade. He served as Provost Marshal General from January 1924 to May 1925, wheby he rejoined the Army General Staff as a Bureau Chief. Araki was promoted to lieutenant general in July 1927 and became Commandant of the Army War College in August 1928.

Araki served as commander of the IJA 6th Division from 1929 through 1931, when he was appointed Deputy Inspector General of Military Training. He was promoted to the rank of full general in October 1933.

== Cabinet minister ==
On 31 December 1931, Araki was appointed Minister of War in the cabinet of Prime Minister Tsuyoshi Inukai. However, in 1932, the May 15 Incident caused Inukai to be assassinated by ultranationalist navy officers for resisting the Army's war demands. Araki praised the assassins and called them "irrepressible patriots."

Prince Saionji, one of the emperor's closest and strongest advisors, attempted to stop the military takeover of the government. In a compromise, the retired Admiral Makoto Saitō, became prime minister on 26 May. Araki remained as War Minister and made further demands on the new government. Later that month, Japan unveiled its new foreign policy, the Amau doctrine. The new policy became a blueprint for Japanese expansionism in Asia.

In September 1932, Araki started to become more outspoken in promoting totalitarianism, militarism, and expansionism. Araki was a supporter of the Northern Expansion Doctrine (Hokushin-ron), which proposed an attack on the Soviet Far East and Siberia. In a September 23 news conference, Araki first mentioned the philosophy of Kodoha ("The Imperial Way"), which linked the Emperor, the people, land, and morality as one indivisible entity, and he emphasized State Shinto. Araki also strongly promoted Seishin Kyoiku (spiritual training) for the army.

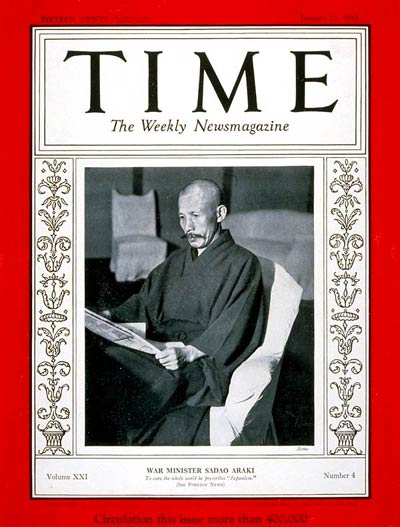
General Araki on Time Magazine cover (1933)

Araki was the principal proponent of the Kodoha political faction (Imperial Way faction) within the Japanese Army, together with Jinzaburo Mazaki, Heisuke Yanagawa, and Toshirō Obata. They were opposed by the Toseiha (Control faction), led by Tetsuzan Nagata.

Araki resigned as army minister on 23 January 1934 due to ill health, and became a member of the Supreme War Council. He was ennobled with the title of baron (danshaku) in 1935 under the kazoku peerage system. In 1936, Kodoha-affiliated young officers launched another rebellion in the February 26 Incident. The rebellion failed. However, unlike with previous rebellions, there were serious consequences. Nineteen of the rebel leaders were executed, and another 40 were imprisoned. Kodoha generals were purged from the Army, including Araki, who was forced to retire in March.

Fumimaro Konoe became prime minister in 1937. In 1938, Konoe appointed Araki as Education Minister, to offset the influence of the Toseiha. That placed him in an ideal position to promote militaristic ideals through the national education system and in the general populace. Araki proposed the incorporation of the samurai code in the national education system. He promoted the use of the official academic text Kokutai no Hongi ("Japan's Fundamentals of National Policy"), and the "moral national bible" Shinmin no Michi ("The Path of Subjects"), an effective catechism on national, religious, cultural, social, and ideological topics. Araki continued to serve as Education Minister when Konoe was succeeded as prime minister by Hiranuma Kiichirō. In January 1939, Araki became involved in the National Spiritual Mobilization Movement and revitalized it by having it sponsor public rallies, radio programs, printed propaganda, and discussion seminars at tonarigumi neighborhood associations.

== Postwar ==
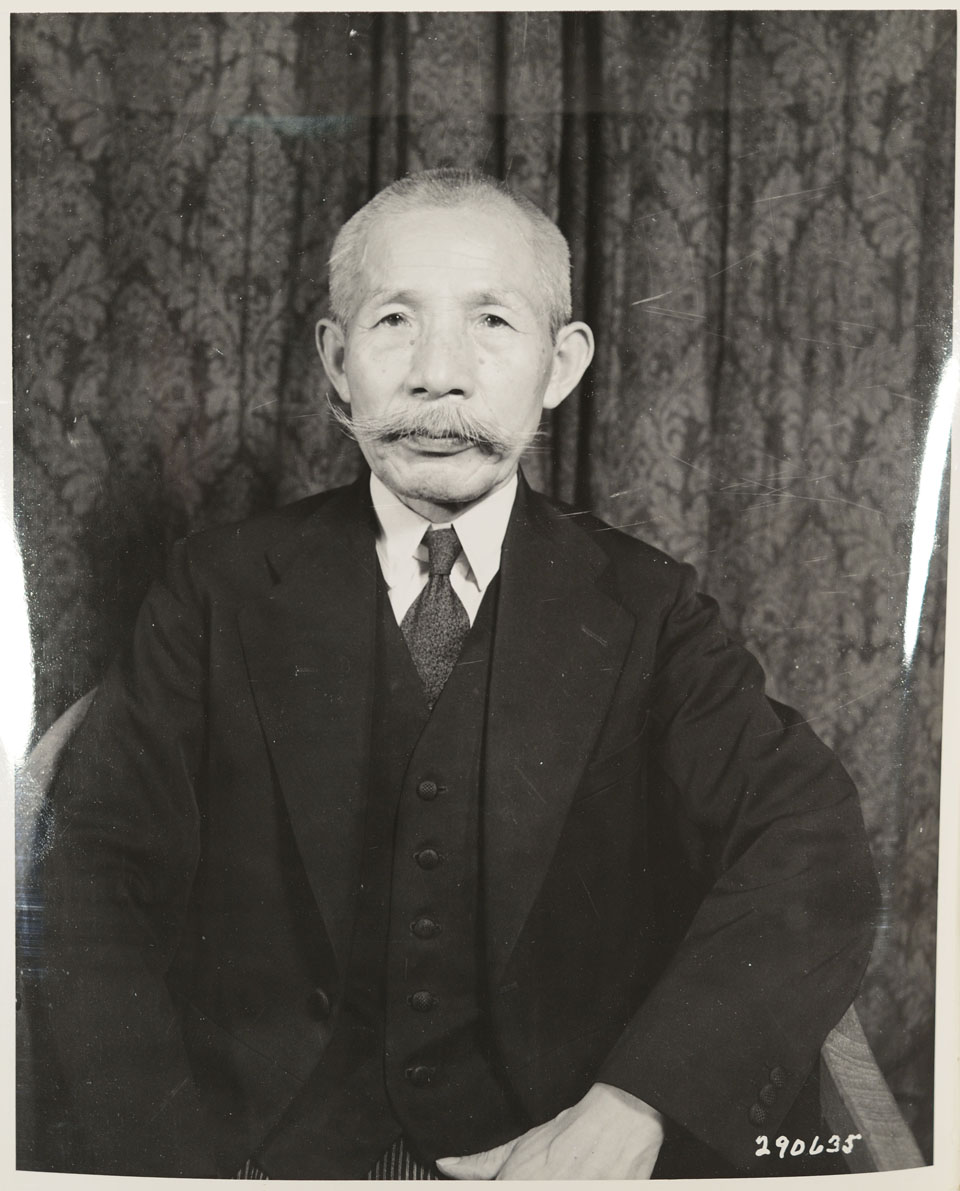
Sadao Araki during the trial for war crimes at International Military Tribunal for the Far East, 1947

After World War II, Araki was arrested by the American Occupation authorities and brought before the International Military Tribunal for the Far East, where he was tried for Class A war crimes. He was convicted and sentenced to life imprisonment for conspiracy to wage aggressive war but was released from Sugamo Prison in 1955 for health reasons. Like other Japanese peers, he was stripped of his hereditary peerage in 1947 upon the abolition of the Kazoku.

Araki died in 1966, and his grave is at Tama Cemetery, in Fuchū in Tokyo.

Political offices
Preceded by Kōichi Kido	Education Minister; May 1938 – Aug 1939	Succeeded by Kakichi Kawarada
Preceded by Jirō Minami	Minister of War; 13 Dec. 1931 – 23 Jan. 1934	Succeeded by Senjūrō Hayashi
Military offices
Preceded by Senjuro Hayashi	Commandant, Army War College; Aug 1928 – Aug 1929	Succeeded by Jirō Tamon
