= Tetsuzan Nagata =

Japanese general (1884–1935)

- 永田 鉄山
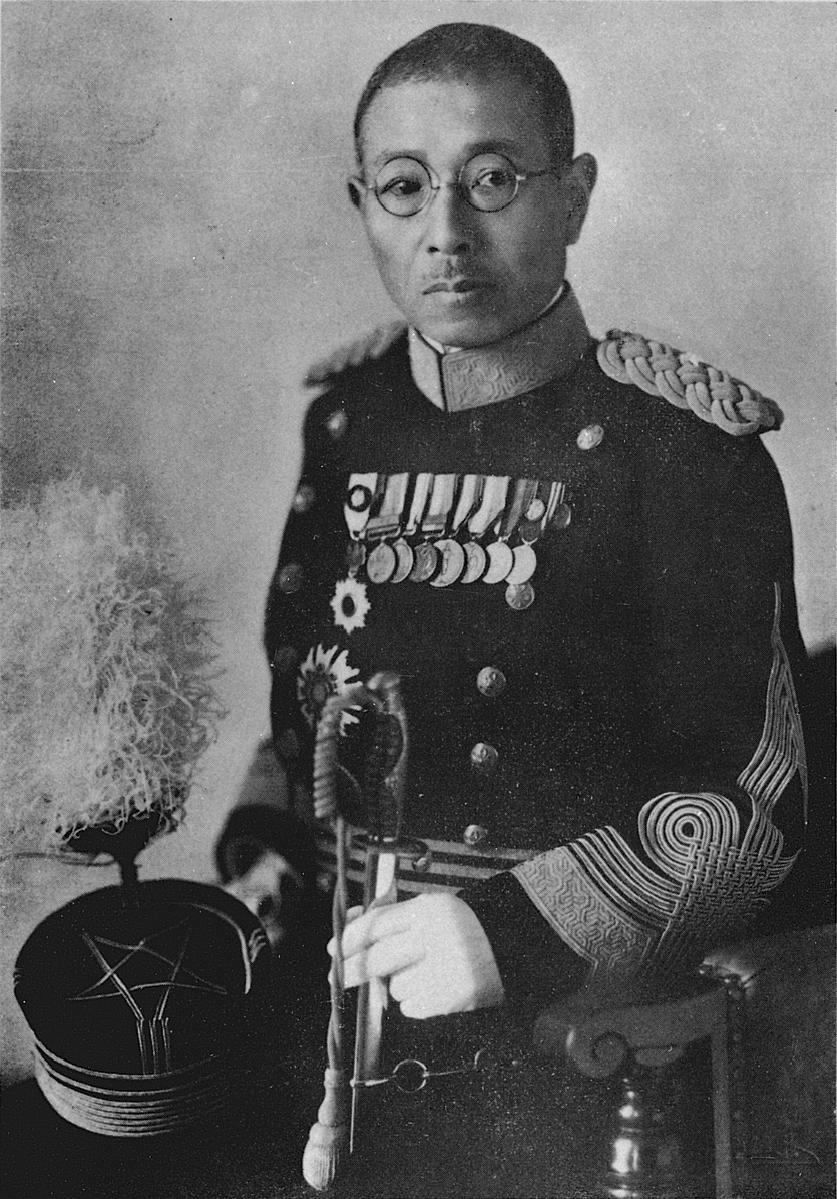
- Born: 14 January 1884; Suwa, Nagano, Japan
- Died: 12 August 1935 (aged 51); Tokyo, Japan
- Military career
- Allegiance: Empire of Japan
- Branch: Imperial Japanese Army
- Service years: 1904–1935
- Rank: Lieutenant General (posthumous)
- Unit: 45th Armored Infantry Division

Tetsuzan Nagata (永田 鉄山, Nagata Tetsuzan; 14 January 1884 – 12 August 1935) was a Japanese military officer and general of the Imperial Japanese Army best known as the victim of the Aizawa Incident in August 1935.

Nagata was an influential military figure in the Meiji government and the de facto leader of the Tōseiha faction during the Gunbatsu political rivalry within the Imperial Japanese Army. Nagata was assassinated by Saburō Aizawa of the rival Kōdōha faction and his death triggered events that led to the February 26 Incident.

== Early life ==
Tetsuzan Nagata was born on 14 January 1884 in Suwa, Nagano Prefecture, the third son of Shigeru Nagata, director of the local Takashima Hospital. Nagata's family were wealthy and he descended from a long line of physicians in service of the Suwa Domain. Nagata was childhood friends with Shigeo Iwanami, the founder of Iwanami Shoten, and the two had a lifelong friendship. Nagata attended Suwa Higher Elementary School in Suwa where he was classmates with Sakuhei Fujiwhara, the namesake of the Fujiwhara effect. In 1895, Nagata transferred to an elementary school in Tokyo until 1898 when he began attending the military school of the Imperial Japanese Army in the city.

== Military career ==
Nagata graduated from the Imperial Japanese Army Academy at the top of the list in October 1904 and from the Army Staff College in November 1911. Nagata served as military attaché to several Japanese embassies in Europe before and during World War I, including Denmark, Sweden, Switzerland, and Germany. Upon Nagata's return to Japan in February 1923, he was assigned to the Imperial Japanese Army General Staff, where he served as administrator of various departments, and was regarded as an expert on Germany. Nagata was promoted to colonel in March 1927 and received command of the IJA 3rd Infantry Regiment. Nagata was promoted to major general in 1932, and became the commander of the IJA 1st Infantry Brigade in 1933. According to the testimony of Lieutenant-General Kajitsuka Ryuji, Chief of the Medical Department of the Kwantung Army, at the Khabarovsk War Crime Trials in late 1949, in the 1930s, Nagata was the "most active supporter" of the program of conducting bacteriological or germ (biological) warfare put forth by Shirō Ishii. Ryuji testified that Ishii kept a bust of Nagata in his offices at Unit 731 headquarters in Pingfan District because he was "so grateful" to Nagata for his support. Ryuji identified Nagata as Chief of the Military Affairs Department of the Ministry of War.

== Death ==
By the mid-1930s, Nagata was considered the leader of the Tōseiha, the moderate political faction that opposed the radical Kōdōha during the Gunbatsu period within the Japanese military. Nagata was responsible for planning Japan's national mobilization strategy as Chief of Mobilization Section, Economic Mobilization Bureau, Ministry of War, to put both the military and the civilian economy on a total war footing in times of national emergency. Nagata's ideas and actions earned him the violent animosity of the Kōdōha, who regarded him as the "chief villain" for collusion with corrupt party politics and the zaibatsu. In July 1935, Nagata's political manoeuvres led to the forced retirement of Jinzaburō Masaki, the Inspector-General of Military Training and a leading member of Kōdōha. Masaki's forced retirement angered his friend Lieutenant-Colonel Saburō Aizawa, a particularly radical member of Kōdōha.

On 12 August 1935, Nagata was assassinated by Lieutenant Colonel Saburo Aizawa for reputedly putting the Army "in the paws of high finance" and in retaliation for Masaki's forced retirement, which became known as the Aizawa Incident. He entered Nagata's office in Tokyo and cut him down with his sword, making no attempt to resist arrest by military police and reportedly said that he "was in an absolute sphere, so there was neither affirmation nor negation, neither good nor evil". Nagata was posthumously promoted to lieutenant general and the Army Minister Senjūrō Hayashi was forced to resign over the affair. Nagata's assassination increased the political polarization within the Imperial Japanese Army, prompting further retaliation between factions that resulted in the February 26 Incident in February 1936, effectively eradicating the Kōdōha and granting the Tōseiha total influence within the army. Aizawa was executed by firing squad in July 1936 after a high-profile court martial trial held by the IJA 1st Division.
