= Imperial Way Faction =

1920s–1930s faction of the Japanese Army

- 皇道派
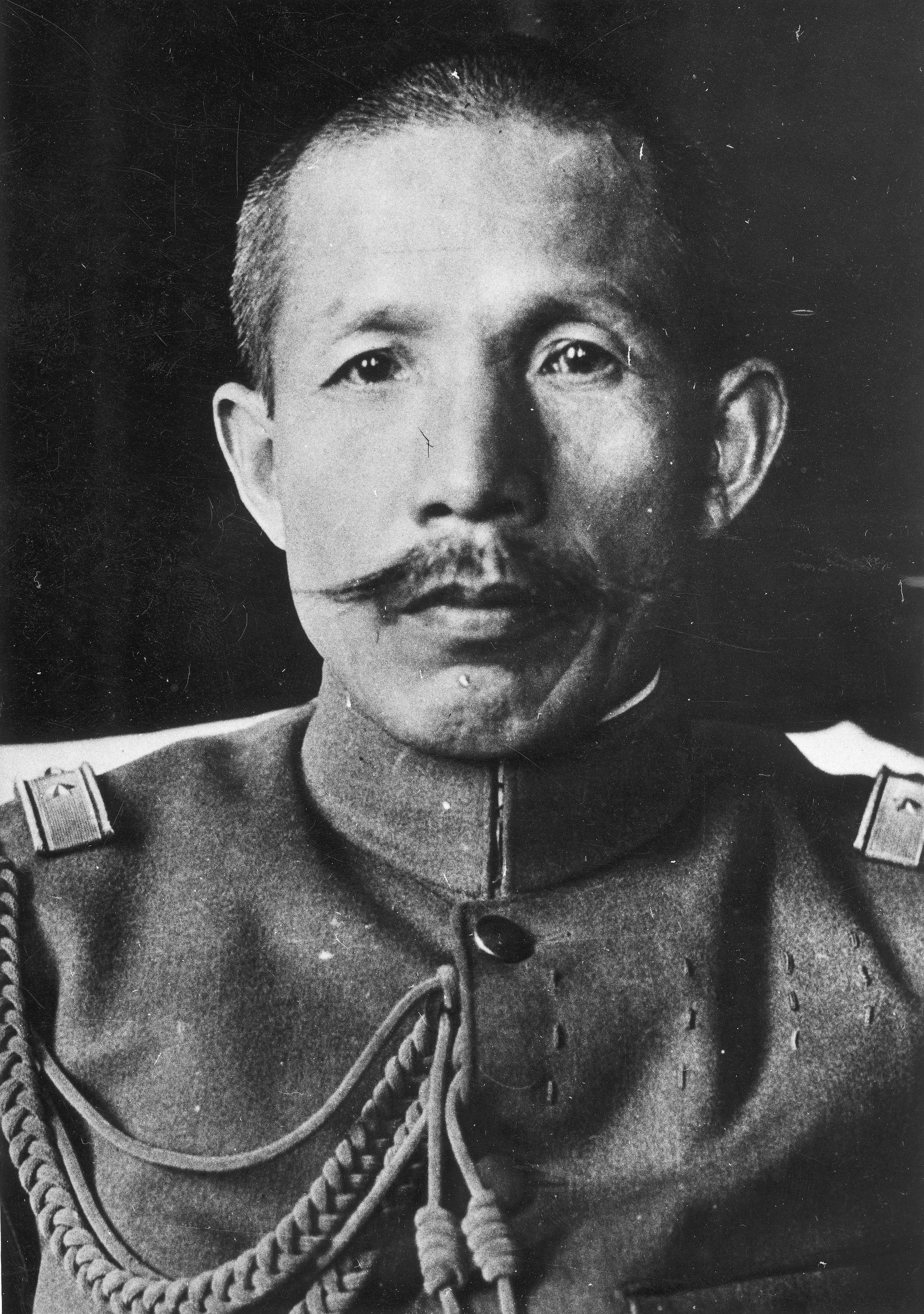
- General Sadao Araki was regarded as the leader and primary philosopher of the Kōdōha.
- Other name: Kōdōha
- Leaders: Sadao Araki; Jinzaburō Masaki; Heisuke Yanagawa
- Founded: 1920s
- Dates active: 1931–1936
- Dissolved: 29 February 1936
- Country: Japan
- Allegiance: Emperor of Japan
- Groups: Saga clique Tosa clique
- Active regions: Tokyo (1st Division)
- Ideology: Authoritarian nationalism; Kokkashugi; Fascism (Japanese) (Note: Whether Imperial Way Faction can be viewed as fascism is debatable; see #Fascism); Traditionalist conservatism; Anti-establishment; Militarism (Japanese)
- Anthem: "Ode to Showa Restoration"
- Status: Dissolved and purged
- Part of: Imperial Japanese Army

The Kōdōha or Imperial Way Faction (Japanese: 皇道派) was a Political faction in the Imperial Japanese Army active in the 1920s and 1930s. The Kōdōha was a traditionalist movement that envisioned a return to an idealized pre-Westernized Japan, promoting militaristic and aggressive imperialist ideals. Led by Generals Sadao Araki and Jinzaburō Masaki, the faction sought to establish a Shōwa Restoration by returning absolute power to the Emperor of Japan, purging the state of liberal politicians, bureaucrats, and industrial conglomerates (zaibatsu). The Kōdōha emphasized the "spiritual power" of the army over the rapid industrialization and material modernization of the Tōseiha, in an attempt to revive traditionalist Statist Shinto Japan in the form of Kokutai. It was supported by junior officers who sympathized with rural agrarian reform and loyalty to the Emperor.

The radical Kōdōha rivaled the Tōseiha (Control Faction) for influence in the army with force, executing multiple assassination attempts for influence. After the failed February 26 incident in 1936, it was dissolved and many supporters were disciplined or executed. The Kōdōha was never an officially organized political party, and it failed to enact lasting reforms on the military.

== Background ==
The Empire of Japan had enjoyed economic growth during World War I but this ended in the early 1920s with the Shōwa financial crisis. Social unrest increased with the growing polarization of society and inequalities, such as trafficking in girls, with the labor unions increasingly influenced by socialism, communism and anarchism.

Meanwhile, the industrial and financial leaders of Japan continued to get wealthier through their inside connections with politicians and bureaucrats. The military was considered "clean" in terms of political corruption, and elements within the army were determined to take direct action to eliminate the perceived threats to Japan created by the weaknesses of liberal democracy and political corruption.

== Origins and ideology ==
Flag used by the Righteous Army during the February 26, 1936, coup attempt. The four characters read "Revere the Emperor, Destroy the Traitors" (尊皇討奸, Sonnō tōkan); cf. the earlier "revere the emperor, expel the barbarians" (尊王攘夷, Sonnō jōi).

The founders of the Kōdōha were General Sadao Araki and his protégé, Jinzaburō Masaki. Araki was a noted political philosopher within the army, who popularized the term 'Kōdōha" (the Imperial Way) in 1932 to describe a movement centered on spiritualism and anti-materialism. He linked the unique Japanese spirit with concepts of state reform, arguing that the Emperor and the people were one and indivisible. Araki was opposed to the over reliance on the material industrialization and extensive economic planning by the state, which he considered akin to communism.

To the Kōdōha, the spiritual training of the Army and the belief in Yamato-damashii was more important than the rapid material modernization and industrialization favored by their rivals, the Tōseiha. Araki's ideology was deeply rooted in traditional Japanese concepts such as the bushido code, emphasizing spiritual power, mental discipline, traditional samurai texts and physical endurance over technical and mechanical superiority and linking the Emperor as a divine figure that would be worshiped. Shinto and Buddhist temples were used for ceremonies that glorified fallen soldiers as kami (divine spirits). Domestically, the Kōdōha envisioned a purified Japanese culture, a return to the traditional values of Japan and opposition to Westernization that was seen as corrupting and polluting the Japanese spirit and minds.

The faction emerged as a reaction against the long-standing hegemony of the Chōshū domain clique within the army. The anti-Chōshū opposition historically consisted of the Army's Satsuma clique, led by Field Marshal Uehara Yūsaku. In 1924, Uehara failed to block Tanaka Giichi's protégé Kazushige Ugaki from becoming War Minister, but his network of dissatisfied officers were the structural predecessor of the Kōdōha.

When Araki became Minister of War in the cabinet of Prime Minister Inukai in 1931, and Masaki became Vice Chief of the Imperial Japanese Army General Staff, Araki purged followers of his rival General Kazushige Ugaki from important posts. Araki additionally purged the Chōshū-affiliated officers, replacing them with his own regional clique from Tosa and Saga.

The faction often overlapped with and gained the support of the "Young Officers' Movement", consisting largely of junior officers. As they spent their careers in line combat units, these officers bonded strongly with their men who originated from rural, impoverished agricultural areas. As a result, the movement developed anti-capitalist sentiments, viewing the zaibatsu, wealthy politicians, and corrupt bureaucrats as exploiting the rural poor. The Kōdōha envisioned a Shōwa Restoration whereby these advisors would be removed, restoring direct rule to Emperor Hirohito and alleviating rural poverty.

In a news conference in September 1932, Araki first mentioned the word 'Kōdō' ("The Imperial Way"), from which his movement received its popular name. They were supported by the Kokuhonsha (National Foundation Society) which advocated for "Japanism" and sought the eradication of democratic, communist and liberal influences in the country and the Sakurakai (Cherry Blossom Society).

=== Fascism ===
The classification of the Kōdōha as fascist is a subject of significant historical debate. The tendency to label the faction as fascist often stems from its revolutionary nature, as the Kōdōha were supported by a mass movement of junior officers and rural soldiers, and it was led by a charismatic figurehead in General Sadao Araki, whose public "spiritual" ideology mirrored the populist tactics of European leaders.

However, the policy of the Kōdōha was fundamentally traditionalist and anti-modern, rejecting the centralized planning and industrial focus of European fascist states. Conversely, the Tōseiha implemented a centralized model of national defense and economic control that most closely resembled the policies of National Socialism, even though they lacked a charismatic leader or mass movement.

== Opposition ==
The Kōdōha met opposition from the Tōseiha (Control Faction), an institutional alignment of staff officers guided by Tetsuzan Nagata.

Fundamental to both factions, however, was the common belief that national defense must be strengthened through a reform of national politics. Both factions adopted some ideas from totalitarian and fascist political philosophies, and espoused a strong skepticism of political party politics and representative democracy.

However, their methods and ideologies were fundamentally opposed. The Tōseiha favored central economic and military planning, technological modernization, and preparation for an industrialized total war and believed the army had to work within the political and legal system and cooperate with the existing bureaucracy and the zaibatsu conglomerates to maximize Japan's industrial and military capacity. The Kōdōha, however, rejected these foreign concepts of total war economics and modernization. Instead, they placed their emphasis entirely on spiritual and emotional matters under the National Polity and wanted to bring about a revolution through violence (a holy war). They actively despised the zaibatsu and the politicians with whom the Tōseiha wished to cooperate with and instead looked to the Emperor as the sole divine figure that would lead them to greatness.

The Kōdōha was strongly supportive of the Strike North strategy of a preemptive strike against the Soviet Union, but the Tōseiha wanted a "more cautious" defense expansion of the Strike South strategy. The Kōdōha thought war in China was a strategic trap that would bleed Japan dry before they could fight a supposedly unavoidable war with the Soviet Union during the "Crisis of 1936". Communism, as embodied by the Soviet Union, was seen as a greater threat to Kōdōha spiritual values and the Emperor's divinity than the argument made by Tōseiha on Western naval powers in the Pacific.

== Decline ==
After the Manchurian Incident, the two cliques struggled against each other for dominance over the military. The Kōdōha was initially dominant under Araki's tenure as War Minister. However, Araki's focus on spiritual training and ideological fervor hindered comprehensive economic and modernization programs desired by the majority of staff officers in the Central Headquarters. Furthermore, his blatant favoritism towards officers from the Saga and Tosa regions alienated the staff officers.

Araki's tenure was marked by political ineffectiveness, as he frequently failed to push the army's demands against the Finance Minister and the Navy, causing his supporters to realize he could not be relied upon. Araki resigned in January 1934, officially due to ill health, leaving the Kōdōha without their leader and causing a decline in their influence. Araki was replaced by General Senjūrō Hayashi, an officer with Tōseiha sympathies.

In November 1934, the Military Academy plot, discovered before it could be implemented, was alleged to have been orchestrated by Kōdōha army officers to murder a number of important politicians. Tetsuzan Nagata used this to force the resignation of Masaki from his position as Inspector General of Military Education (the third most powerful position in the Japanese Army hierarchy) for his complicity in the plot, and demoted some 3,000 other officers.

In retaliation, a Kōdōha officer, Saburō Aizawa, murdered Nagata in the Aizawa Incident. Aizawa's military tribunal was held under the jurisdiction of the First Infantry Division in Tokyo, whose commander, General Heisuke Yanagawa, was a follower of Araki. The trial thus became a vehicle by which the Kōdōha was able to denounce the Tōseiha, portray Aizawa as a selfless patriot, and Nagata as an unprincipled power-mad schemer.

=== February 26 incident ===
At the climax of the Aizawa trial, to reduce tensions on the Tokyo area, the First Infantry Division was ordered from Tokyo to Manchuria. Instead, this caused the situation to escalate further, as the junior officers decided that the time was right for direct action, and attempted a coup d'état known as the February 26 Incident. Despite being inspired by General Sadao Araki and relying on him as a figurehead, the February 26 movement was separate from his direct leadership, and he was not associated with their plans or activities.

The rebels' primary targets were the high-ranking moderates of the Navy's Treaty Faction, whom they viewed as corrupt, pro-Western capitalist figures. Admiral Saito Makoto was assassinated, and Admiral Suzuki Kantaro was severely wounded while Prime Minister Okada Keisuke narrowly escaped. This strike represented the convergence between the Army's Imperial Way Faction and the Navy's Fleet Faction, as both groups sought to dismantle the Washington naval system and the pro-Western Japanese capitalist system.

However, the coup failed three days later as neither Araki or Mazaki declared their support for the movement or took power like the rebels had hoped. Unlike with previous rebellions, the Emperor, government and military establishment labeled the rebels as mutinous. The failure of the coup resulted in the almost complete purge of Kōdōha members from army positions and the retirement of their leader Araki.

== Legacy ==
In the aftermath, the term "Kōdōha" was applied by the Tōseiha as a broad label to justify the purge of any officers who shared even minimal ideological overlap with the radicals, regardless of their actual involvement in the incident. Thus, after the February 26 Incident, the Kōdōha effectively ceased to exist, along with most other factions. The Tōseiha became completely unopposed in the military, and essentially lost most of its raison d'être as a separate faction.

Although the Tōseiha gained control of the army, the Kōdōha ideals of spiritual power and imperial mysticism remained embedded in the lower levels of the army, as did the tradition of insubordination of junior officers (gekokujō). These elements resurfaced with the outbreak of the Second Sino-Japanese War in 1937 and would also go on to fuel a tradition of death, as shame would be deeply entrenched in Japanese military culture; one of the primary values in the samurai way of life and the Bushido code was loyalty and honor until death, an act which infamously took on the form of Kamikaze suicide attacks.

Into the late 20th century and early 21th century, Kōdōha influences lingered on in fringe Uyoku dantai political groups and among anti-American Japanese conservatives who are marginalized by the conservative establishment of the ruling Liberal Democratic Party (LDP), in favor of post-war economic reconstruction and Japanese military alliance with the United States. Debates persist on whether risks of radical policies advocated by these groups such as the proposed abolishment of the American-drafted Article 9 of the Japanese Constitution are merely deferred even as the LDP grappled with numerous corruption and political scandals and Japan facing multiple geopolitical threats from China, Russia and North Korea.

== See also ==
- Control Faction
- Hakkō ichiu (i.e. "all the world under one roof"), the belief that the Emperor should rule over the whole world.
- Ultranationalism (Japan)
- Fascist mysticism
- National mysticism
