= 財閥 =

財閥, an East Asian word which means "business conglomerate" or "financial magnate", may refer to:

- Zaibatsu, Japanese business conglomerates that controlled significant parts of the Japanese economy throughout the Edo and Meiji periods
- Chaebol, large Korean family-controlled, government-assisted corporate groups
