= Gunbatsu =

Japanese term related to military power

Gunbatsu (軍閥; lit. 'military clique') is a Japanese term having two separate meanings. Its first meaning is a reference to the Japanese military leadership which exploited its privileged status to vie against the civilian government for control over the nation's policies (particularly during the early Shōwa era). It also refers to competing political factions or cliques within the Japanese military itself. The term came into common use in the Taishō period (1912-1926).

== Gunbatsu in terms of national policy ==
From the formation of the Imperial Japanese Army and Imperial Japanese Navy following the Meiji Restoration, the military had a very strong influence over the civilian government. The early Meiji government viewed Japan as threatened by western imperialism, and one of the prime motivations for the Fukoku Kyohei policy was to strengthen Japan's economic and industrial foundations, so that a strong military could be built to defend Japan against outside powers. Almost all leaders in the military were ex-samurai or descendants of samurai, and shared a common set of values and outlooks.

A major factor in the political power of the military was its complete freedom from civilian control, as guaranteed under the Meiji Constitution. In 1878, the Imperial Japanese Army established the Imperial Japanese Army General Staff office, modeled after the Prussian General Staff. This office was independent of, and equal to (and later superior) to the Ministry of War of Japan in terms of authority. The Imperial Japanese Navy soon followed with the Imperial Japanese Navy General Staff. These General Staff offices were responsible for the planning and execution of military operations, and reported directly to the emperor. As the Chiefs of the General Staff were not cabinet ministers, they did not report to the Prime Minister of Japan, and were thus completely independent of civilian oversight or control.

The Army and the Navy also had decisive say on the formation of (and survival of) any civilian cabinet. Since the law required that the posts of Army Minister and Navy Minister be filled by active-duty officers nominated by their respective services, and since the law also required that the prime minister resign if he could not fill all of his cabinet posts, both the Army and the Navy had final say on the formation of a government, and could bring down the cabinet at any time by withdrawing their minister and refusing to nominate a successor. Although this tactic was actually used only once (ironically to prevent General Kazushige Ugaki from becoming prime minister in 1937), the threat always loomed large when the military made any demands on the civilian leadership.

Between 1885 and 1945, generals and admirals held 15 of the 30 premierships, and 115 of the 404 civilian cabinet posts. The military also had a broad political power base via the Imperial Military Reservist's Association and other political organizations, including nationalist political parties and secret societies.

== Gunbatsu in terms of internal issues within the military ==
From the time of its formation following the Meiji Restoration, the Japanese military was riven by numerous internal divisions.

=== Hanbatsu ===
One of the most serious issues facing the Japanese military was interservice rivalry created by residual feudal sentiments. The Army officer class was dominated by men from the former Chōshū domain, and the Navy was likewise dominated by men from the former Satsuma domain. This created two major issues: Chōshū and Satsuma were historically enemies, and their traditional enmity came to be reflected on the rivalry and lack of cooperation between the two main branches of the Japanese military.

With the senior officer class dominated by men who were not hesitant to use nepotism and favoritism, promising young officers from other parts of Japan were denied promotion and their skills and ideas were not heeded. This created tremendous resentment, leading to the formation of a secret society, The Double Leaf Society, whose avowed goal was to break the Chōshū stranglehold on the Army. It was not until the Taishō period that graduates from the Army Staff College and Imperial Japanese Army Academy began to undermine the Chōshū hold over the Army leadership.

=== Washington Naval Treaty ===
The Imperial Japanese Navy was slightly more open than the Army in terms of promotion of qualified senior staff. However, the major political issue within the Navy centered around the Washington Naval Treaty of 1923, which split the Navy down in the middle in terms of the pro-Treaty Treaty Faction and anti-Treaty Fleet Faction.

=== Political factionalism ===
Just as the Army overcame issues with residual feudalism, problems began to arise between rival cliques of officers who claimed to represent the “true will” of the Emperor. In basic terms, these cliques fell under the Imperial Way Faction with many young activists who were strongly supportive of the hokushin-ron strategy of a preemptive strike against the Soviet Union and the opposing Control Faction, which sought to impose greater discipline over the Army and war with China as a strategic imperative.

Fundamental to both factions, was the common belief that national defense must be strengthened through a reform of national politics. Both factions adopted some ideas from totalitarian, fascist and state socialist political philosophies, and espoused a strong skepticism for political party politics and representative democracy.

However, rather than the confrontational approach of the Imperial Way Faction, which wanted to bring about a revolution (the Showa Restoration), the Control Faction foresaw that a future war would be a total war, and would require the cooperation of the bureaucracy and the zaibatsu to maximize Japan's industrial and military capacity. Although the Control Faction emerged dominant after the February 26 Incident of 1936, elements of both factions continued to dominate Army politics until the surrender of Japan and abolition of the imperial Japanese military in 1945.

== See also ==
- Zaibatsu
