= Senjūrō Hayashi =

Prime Minister of Japan in 1937

- 林 銑十郎
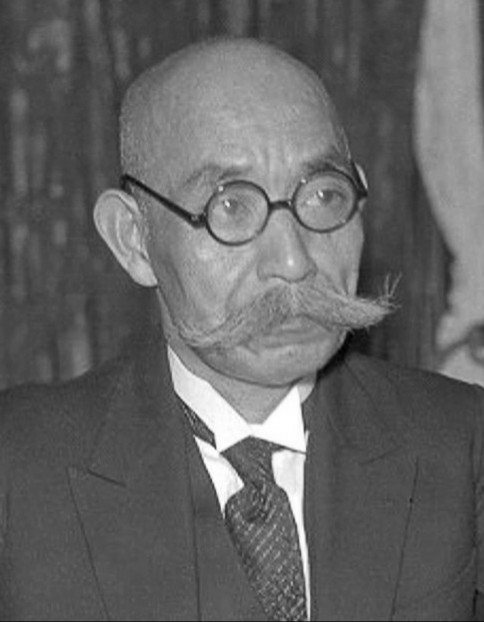
- Hayashi in 1937

Prime Minister of Japan
- In office 2 February 1937 – 4 June 1937
- Monarch: Shōwa
- Preceded by: Kōki Hirota
- Succeeded by: Fumimaro Konoe

Minister of Education
- In office 2 February 1937 – 4 June 1937
- Prime Minister: Himself
- Preceded by: Hirao Hachisaburō
- Succeeded by: Eiji Yasui

Minister for Foreign Affairs
- In office 2 February 1937 – 3 March 1937
- Prime Minister: Himself
- Preceded by: Hachirō Arita
- Succeeded by: Naotake Satō

Minister of the Army
- In office 23 January 1934 – 5 September 1935
- Prime Minister: Saitō Makoto; Keisuke Okada
- Preceded by: Sadao Araki
- Succeeded by: Yoshiyuki Kawashima

Inspector General of Military Training
- In office 26 May 1932 – 23 January 1934
- Monarch: Shōwa
- Preceded by: Nobuyoshi Mutō
- Succeeded by: Jinzaburō Masaki

Commander of the Japanese Korean Army
- In office 22 November 1930 – 26 May 1932
- Monarch: Shōwa
- Preceded by: Jirō Minami
- Succeeded by: Yoshiyuki Kawashima

Personal details
- Born: 23 February 1876 Kanazawa, Ishikawa, Japan
- Died: 4 February 1943 (aged 66) Tokyo, Japan
- Resting place: Tama Cemetery
- Spouse: Hatsu Hayashi

Senjūrō Hayashi (林 銑十郎, Hayashi Senjūrō; 23 February 1876 – 4 February 1943) was a Japanese politician and general. He served as Imperial Japanese Army Commander of the Japanese Korean Army during the Mukden Incident and the invasion of Manchuria. He briefly served as Prime Minister of Japan in 1937.

== Early life and education ==
Hayashi was born on 23 February 1876, in Kodatsuno, Kanazawa, Ishikawa Prefecture, the first son of secretary of Tonami District Office Hayashi Shishirō and his wife Bessho Saha. The family was a samurai-class family formerly in service to Kaga Domain. The second oldest of his brothers Hayashi Ryōzō became an Imperial Army Colonel, and the youngest brother Shirakawa Yūkichi became Vice Mayor of Tokyo.

Hayashi dropped out of school in July 1894 to enlist in the Imperial Japanese Army at the start of the First Sino-Japanese War. After the end of the war, he attended the Imperial Japanese Army Academy, and on graduation in June 1897 was assigned to the IJA 7th Infantry Regiment. in 1903, he graduated from the Army Staff College. With the start of the Russo-Japanese War, Hayashi participated in the Siege of Port Arthur.

== Military career ==
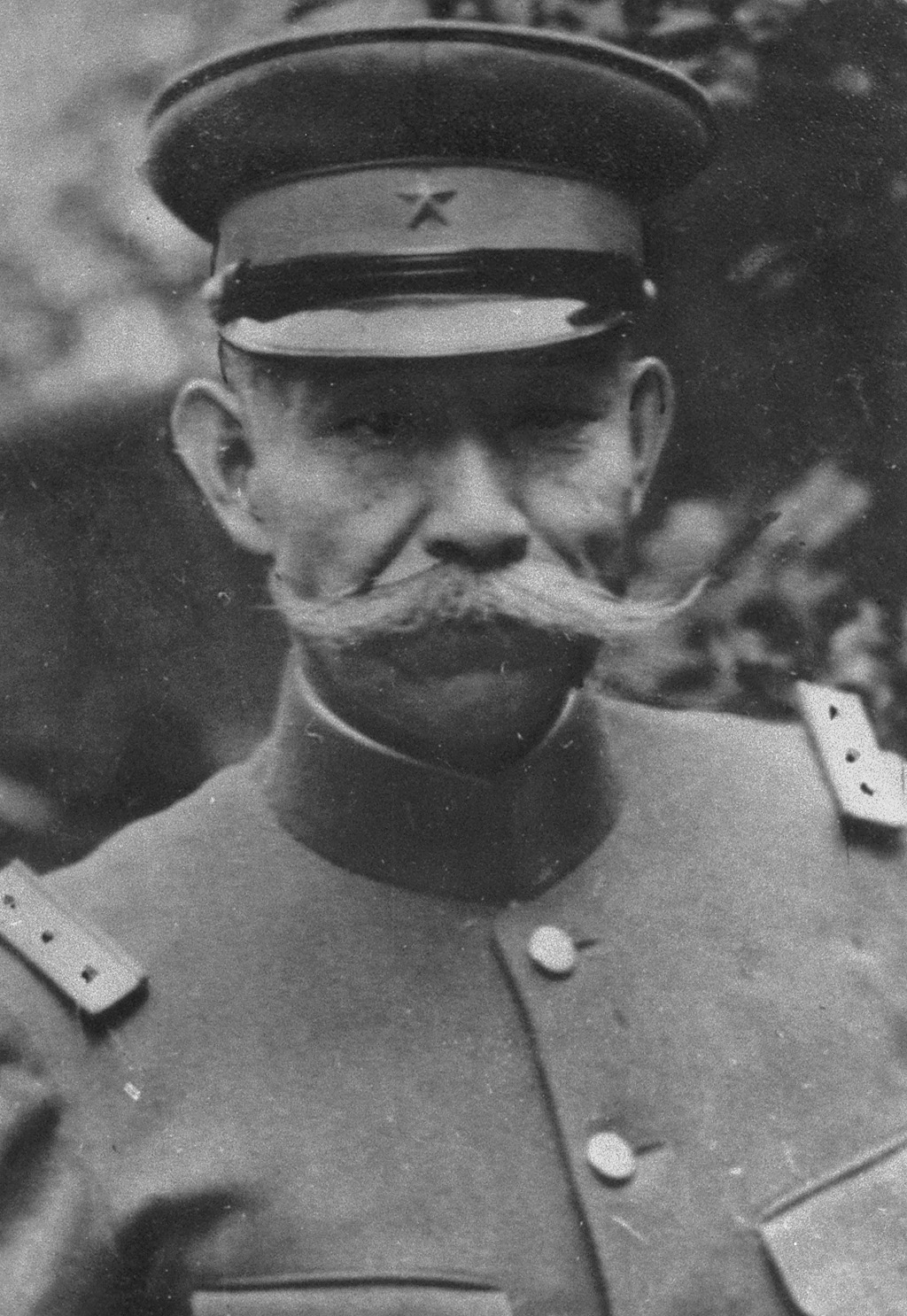
General Senjūrō Hayashi

Hayashi's first major command from 1918 to 1920 was as commanding officer of the IJA 57th Infantry Regiment, followed by a time in 1921 attached to the Technical Research Headquarters and as an acting Military Investigator. From 1921 to 1923 he was the head of the Preparatory Course at the Imperial Japanese Army Academy, followed by a time attached to the Inspectorate General of Military Training. From 1923 to 1924 he was the Japanese Army Representative to the League of Nations, followed by another stint attached to the Inspectorate General of Military Training from 1924 to 1925.

In 1925, Hayashi became the commanding Officer of the IJA 2nd Infantry Brigade. In 1926 he was made Commandant of the Tokyo Bay Fortress. In 1927, he became the Commandant of the Army War College, followed in 1928 as Deputy Inspector-General of Military Training. Finally in 1929 he became the General Officer Commanding the Imperial Guards Division.

In 1930, Lieutenant-General Senjūrō Hayashi, was made Commander in Chief of the Japanese Korean Army. On the day after the Mukden Incident on 19 September, he ordered the IJA 20th Division to split its force, forming the 39th Mixed Brigade. Acting without authorization by the Emperor or central government in Tokyo, Hayashi ordered the 39th Mixed Brigade to cross the Yalu River that same day into Manchuria. The Cabinet was forced to concede the point to the military afterwards and the movement of the 39th Mixed Brigade from Korea was authorized on 22 September.

Following his command in Korea, Hayashi was made Inspector General of Military Training and a member of the Supreme War Council from 1932 to 1934. In 1932, he was awarded with the Order of the Sacred Treasure (1st class) and in 1934, he was awarded the Order of the Rising Sun (1st class).

== Political career ==
From 1934 to 1935 Hayashi was Army Minister, and again member of the Supreme War Council from 1935 until his retirement the next year.

As Army Minister, Hayashi was a supporter of Major General Tetsuzan Nagata, who was Chief of Military Bureau and the leader of the Tōseiha faction within the Imperial Japanese Army. The Tōseiha scored a victory in July 1935 when General Jinzaburō Masaki, one of the leaders of the Kōdōha faction was removed as Inspector General of Military Training. But Nagata was assassinated the next month (the Aizawa Incident). The struggle between the Tōseiha and Kōdōha factions continued below the surface of the government; and the war in North China carried on apace until February 1936.

Hayashi also promoted Fumimaro Konoe's doctrines, as a "right-winger" amongst the militarists, against "left-winger" radical militarists, led by Kingoro Hashimoto, wanted to establish a Military Shogunate through revolutionary means.

== Premiership (1937) ==
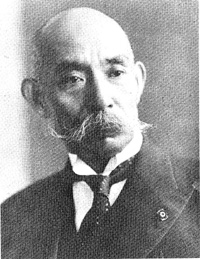
- Premiership of Senjūrō Hayashi; 2 February 1937 – 4 June 1937
- Monarch: Emperor Shōwa
- Cabinet: Hayashi Cabinet
- Party: Military (Army)
- Election: 1937
- Seat: Naikaku Sōri Daijin Kantei
- Emblem of the Government of Japan

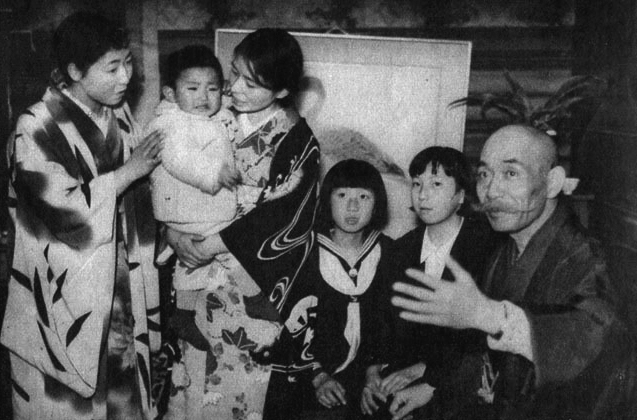
Hayashi with his family celebrating his inauguration as prime minister, 2 February 1937

Hayashi served as the Prime Minister of Japan for a brief four-month period in 1937, where he tried to establish a cabinet that rose above the factional strife of the political parties. He later demanded that members of his cabinet renounce their party ties.

== Later life ==
Later from 1940 to 1941, he was a Privy Councillor. Hayashi was also the president of the Greater Japan Muslim League (大日本回教協会, Dai Nihon Kaikyō Kyōkai).

Hayashi suffered from an intracranial hemorrhage in January 1943 and died at his home on 4 February without regaining conscious. He was posthumously awarded the Order of the Golden Kite (4th class) and the Order of the Paulownia Flowers.

== Honours ==
From the corresponding article in the Japanese Wikipedia

- Grand Cordon of the Order of the Sacred Treasure (1932)
- Grand Cordon of the Order of the Rising Sun (1934)
- Grand Cordon of the Order of the Rising Sun with Paulownia Flowers (1943; posthumous)

Political offices
Preceded by Sadao Araki	Minister of War; 23 January 1934 – 5 September 1935	Succeeded by Yoshiyuki Kawashima
Preceded by Hachirō Arita	Minister of Foreign Affairs; Feb 1937 – Mar 1937	Succeeded by Naotake Satō
Preceded by Hachisaburō Hirao	Minister of Education; Feb 1937 – Jun 1937	Succeeded by Eiji Yasui
Preceded by Kōki Hirota	Prime Minister of Japan; Feb 1937 – Jun 1937	Succeeded by Fumimaro Konoe
Military offices
Preceded by Nobuyoshi Mutō	Inspector-General of Military Training; May 1932 – Jan 1934	Succeeded by Jinsaburō Mazaki
Preceded by Jirō Minami	Commander, IJA Chōsen Army; Nov 1930 – May 1932	Succeeded by Yoshiyuki Kawashima
Preceded by Naotoshi Hasegawa	Commander, Imperial Guards; Aug 1929 – Dec 1930	Succeeded by Renichirō Okamoto
Preceded by Hanzō Kanaya	Commandant, Army Staff College; Mar 1927 – Aug 1928	Succeeded by Sadao Araki
