= Tōseiha =

Reformist political faction of the Imperial Japanese Army during the 1920s–30s

Control Faction
- 統制派
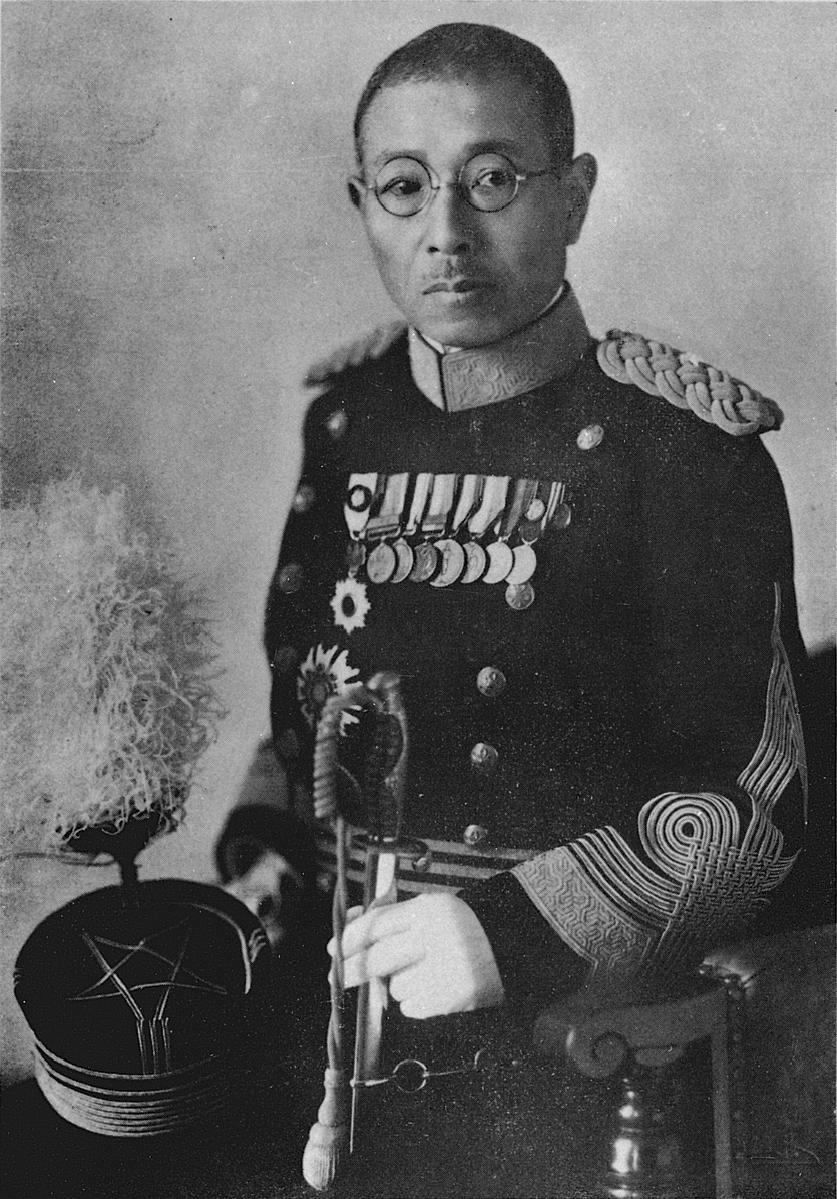
- Lieutenant General Tetsuzan Nagata was the leader of the Tōseiha until his assassination in the Aizawa Incident in August 1935.
- Leaders: Tetsuzan Nagata (1929–1935); Hideki Tōjō (1936–1944)
- Founded: c. 1929
- Dissolved: 18 July 1944
- Country: Japan
- Allegiance: Empire of Japan (military law and state bureaucracy)
- Headquarters: Ministry of War, Tokyo
- Ideology: Authoritarian conservatism; Militarism (Japanese); Under Tōjō: Totalitarianism; Fascism (Japanese); Factions: Para-Nazism
- Status: Disbanded after government consolidation
- Part of: Imperial Japanese Army

The Tōseiha or Control Faction (Japanese: 統制派) was an informal political faction in the Imperial Japanese Army active in the 1920s and 1930s. The term Tōseiha was not a self-designated name; it was a pejorative label coined by their rivals in the revolutionary Kōdōha (Imperial Way Faction) to describe the generally conservative officers who opposed the Kōdōha spiritual radicalism and aggressive anti-modernization ideals, and instead favoring maintaining Japanese imperialism under the rule of military law and prioritizing military modernization and industrialization with the existing state bureaucracy and Zaibatsu to prepare for total war.

The coalition was initially centered around the efforts of Major General Tetsuzan Nagata, who organized the military's diverse interests such as the Reform bureaucrats, against domain-based cliques like the Chōshū. After Nagata's assassination in 1935, the Tōseiha was co-opted by Hideki Tojo, who consolidated a fascist faction that monopolized the military's authority after the failed February 26 Incident of 1936. The faction ultimately lost power following Japan's disastrous defeats in World War II.

== Background ==
The Empire of Japan had enjoyed economic growth during The First World War but this ended in the early 1920s with the Shōwa financial crisis. Social unrest increased with the growing polarization of society and inequalities, with the labor unions increasingly influenced by socialism, communism and anarchism, but the industrial and financial leaders of Japan continued to get wealthier through their inside connections with politicians and bureaucrats. The military was considered "clean" in terms of political corruption, and elements within the army were determined to take direct action to eliminate the perceived threats to Japan created by the weaknesses of liberal democracy and political corruption.

The roots of the Tōseiha lie in the Baden-Baden Pact of 1921, where Tetsuzan Nagata, Yasuji Okamura, and Toshiro Obata agreed to modernize the army and end domain-based cliques.

However, the coalition fractured over the strategy for Japan’s expansion. Toshiro Obata and his followers (the emerging Kōdōha) argued for the hokushin-ron ("Northern Expansion Doctrine") against the Soviet Union under the belief that Manchuria and Siberia was in Japan's sphere of interest, that communism posed a greater threat to the Shinto religion and the Emperor's divinity and believing that a conflict into southern China would drain the resources necessary for a pre-emptive strike against the northern enemy. Conversely, Tetsuzan Nagata and the Tōseiha argued that Japan must have a cautious defense expansion towards the south known as Nanshin-ron ("Southern Expansion Doctrine") to secure resources and industrial capacity of Manchuria and China and argued that the main obstacles to Japanese ambitions were the United States and the British Empire controlling the Pacific.

The Tōseiha and Kōdōha both adopted ideas from totalitarian and fascist political philosophies, and shared the fundamental ideals that national defense must be strengthened through a reform of national politics and espoused a strong skepticism for political party politics and representative democracy. Although the factions shared key ideals, their differences was based on how to achieve them. The Kōdōha (Imperial Way) envisioned a return to an idealized pre-Industrialization, pre-Westernized Japan, while the Tōseiha favored industrialization and modernization at the time.

=== Terminology ===
The phrase "Control Faction" has occasionally been used more loosely in English encyclopedias to describe the army establishment of the 1920s under Kazushige Ugaki. However, Nagata had organized his coalition in opposition to Ugaki.

== Institutional realignment under Nagata (1929–1935) ==
The Tōseiha was originally an effort by Tetsuzan Nagata to synthesize competing interests within the army into a professional, staff-led center. Nagata formed the One Day Meeting in 1929 from the merger of the Futaba-kai and Mokuyō-kai. The ODM's central objective was the innovation of army personnel to oust the dominant establishment faction of General Kazushige Ugaki and the Chōshū clique, which Nagata viewed as a hindrance to modern total war mobilization. The Tōseiha was initially a non-regional coalition, as opposed to Araki's reintroduction of regional politics into army promotions and policy decisions. Many Tōseiha members were promising graduates of the Imperial Japanese Army Academy and Army Staff College, and were concerned about Araki's emphasis of the spiritual morale of the army instead of modernization and mechanization. Nagata acted as the linchpin who bridged the gap between the radical younger officers seeking state reform and the senior staff who prioritized institutional stability. He pooled the abilities of officers like Hitoshi Imamura, Hideki Tojo, and Yasuji Okamura to focus on long-term industrial planning rather than immediate spiritual revolution. Nagata established the consensus of the graduates of the War College, unified by a shared rationalist worldview and a commitment to bureaucratic process over ideological fanaticism.

Nagata's own doctrine rested on the concept of total war, which he formulated after he left Japan in 1913 to serve as a military attaché in Germany and other European countries for six years. He argued that a future great-power conflict would require the complete mobilization of a nation's industrial, financial, and human resources, making the army's cooperation with the zaibatsu and civilian bureaucracy a strategic necessity rather than a compromise of military prerogative. This thinking underlay his 1934 promotion to Chief of the Military Affairs Bureau, a position from which he "began to implement his plans for reforming the Army and Japan". Nagata was connected to a 1934 Army Ministry pamphlet on national defense policy, co-drafted by Sumihisa Ikeda and Teiichi Suzuki.

== Opposition ==
The name Tōseiha was a pejorative exonym coined exclusively by Kōdōha members and their sympathizers. Officers assigned to this "faction" never characterized themselves as such, and it lacked any formal organization or self-identified membership. It was an institutional alignment of staff officers within the Ministry of War and the General Staff who adhered to bureaucratic procedures and modern military planning. Rather than the confrontational approach of the Kōdōha, which wanted to bring about the Showa Restoration through violence and revolution (a holy war), the Tōseiha sought reform by working within the existing system. The Tōseiha foresaw that a future war would be a total war, and to maximize Japan's industrial, technological and military capacity would require the cooperation of Japan's bureaucracy and the zaibatsu conglomerates which the Kōdōha despised.

In late 1931, the Manchurian Incident and the subsequent Japanese invasion of Manchuria saw the two factions struggle against each other for greater influence over the military's strategic direction. While the Kōdōha were initially dominant due to General Sadao Araki's popularity, but their influence began to wane following Araki's resignation in 1934.

As the Chief of the Military Affairs Bureau, Tetsuzan Nagata was viewed by radicals as the mastermind of a conspiracy whose institutional power stifled the Kōdōha. His role in the forced retirement of the Kōdōha leader General Jinzaburō Masaki led to Masaki himself encouraging the view that his dismissal was a conspiracy engineered by Nagata, a claim the rebels accepted as fact. This culminated in the Aizawa Incident in August 1935, when Lieutenant Colonel Saburō Aizawa assassinated Nagata in his office, claiming he was slaying a traitor who was corrupting the army. Aizawa's trial was transformed into a platform for supporters of the Kōdōha to justify his actions and further spread the myth of a Toseiha conspiracy.

During the February 26 Incident in 1936, the Kōdōha junior officers targeted high-ranking statesmen and the moderate Navy Treaty Faction leadership in an attempt to trigger the Shōwa Restoration. General Watanabe Jōtarō was the only Tōseiha-aligned military target. The attempt to start a revolution failed; the Kōdōha was dissolved and its leadership was purged from the military.

== Consolidation of the national defense state under Tōjō (1936–1941) ==
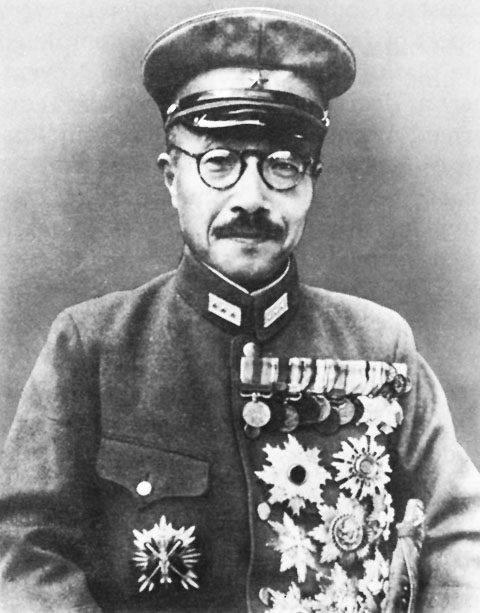
Hideki Tojo, the Prime Minister of Japan during much of World War II, was the later leader of the Tōseiha.

The transition from Nagata's structural organizational efforts to the Tōseiha as a faction occurred after Nagata's assassination in 1935. Hideki Tojo emerged as the senior figure of the "Control" officers. Unlike Nagata, who sought to balance various factions, Tojo capitalized on the institutional void to consolidate a personal power base.

The Tōseiha capitalized on the February 26 incident; the assassination of liberal leaders like Saitō Makoto and Takahashi Korekiyo decapitated the state's moderate opposition, and the subsequent military suppression of the coup provided a pretext to purge the radical Kōdōha, alongside most other factions, permanently.

Tojo transformed the Tōseiha by institutionalizing the fascist-leaning "National Defense State" that Nagata had only envisioned as a theoretical blueprint. Tojo effectively solidified control of the state bureaucracy under this faction through the Ni-Ki-San-Suke power bloc that he had established during his time in Manchukuo. The bloc's nickname derived from a pun on the final syllables of its five members' given names: the two "Ki" were Tōjō Hideki, Kwantung Army Chief of Staff from 1937, and Naoki Hoshino, Director-General of the Manchukuo General Affairs Board; the three "Suke" were Nobusuke Kishi, Vice-Minister of the Manchukuo Industrial Department from October 1936; Yōsuke Matsuoka, president of the South Manchuria Railway; and Yoshisuke Aikawa, founder of the Nissan zaibatsu.

Where Nagata had relied on the Tōseiha's influence of Army Ministry and General Staff postings, Tōjō gained significant power over the civilian government in May 1936, when the Hirota cabinet restored the requirement that the War and Navy Ministers be serving officers on active duty, at the Army Ministry's request. Because the central leadership now dominated by Tōseiha-aligned officers could refuse to nominate a War Minister, it thereby gained an effective veto over the formation and survival of any cabinet, a power later credited with blocking Kazushige Ugaki's 1937 attempt to form a government and with helping bring down the Yonai cabinet in 1940.

== Seizure of civilian government and decline (1941–1944) ==
In October 1941, Tōjō became Prime Minister of Japan, while concurrently holding the posts of Minister of War and Minister of Home Affairs. This combined authority enabled him to integrate the military, the civilian government, and internal police under his direct control. In the Diet, his administration aggressively sought to suppress legislative oversight and silence opposition. A clear example of this suppression occurred during the 77th session in November 1941. Amidst tense, failing negotiations with the United States, there was widespread legislative interest regarding the new cabinet's stance on war. When senior Diet member Goutarou Ogawa questioned the government's direction, pro-army legislator Yuki Takechi immediately tabled Motion 77-1 ("Motion to conclude questioning of the State Ministers"). The motion successfully halted the debate after a single question and shielded Tōjō regarding his strategic decisions leading toward war.

This centralization of control culminated in the 1942 Japanese general election, where the military intervened in the democratic process. The army, under the Imperial Rule Assistance Association (IRAA) led by Tōjō, formally endorsed and funded candidates cooperative with the military while obstructing and punishing non-endorsed politicians, including jailing anti-army candidates for their rhetoric.

According to political scientist Makoto Fukumoto, this consolidation of authority was not accomplished via brute force alone, but rather through the selective co-optation of economically vulnerable elites. The Allied economic sanctions of 1940 and 1941 (specifically the American oil and steel embargoes) severely disrupted international trade, leaving business-aligned legislators in tradable sectors (such as textiles, steel, petrochemicals, and international trade) financially weakened and unable to fund independent campaigns. To secure political survival, these weakened politicians capitulated to Tōjō, actively seeking IRAA endorsement and campaign financing. In contrast, legislators who were connected to military procurement and benefited from lucrative state contracts had remained economically resilient. These legislators used their leverage to preserve their institutional autonomy and resisted centralization, demonstrating that material vulnerability, rather than ideological alignment, drove the legislative realignment under Tōjō.

However, the power concentrated in Tōjō's faction began to unravel as the tide of the Pacific War turned against Japan. After the decisive defeat at the Battle of Midway in June 1942, Tōjō's administration faced growing opposition from the Conference of Senior Statesmen and rival military factions. The turning point came with the devastating loss in the Battle of Saipan in July 1944. The fall of Saipan breached Japan's inner defense perimeter, placing the home islands within range of American bombers.

Desperate to survive the political fallout from Saipan, Tōjō attempted to reorganize his cabinet by adding former prime ministers to his government. This failed when a senior statesmen conference convened on July 17, 1944, where prominent figures like Kōki Hirota and Mitsumasa Yonai explicitly refused to join him. Without their support, "The Tōjō government thus had no choice but to resign the next day." He spent the remainder of the war in the military reserve, marking the collapse of the Tōseiha.

Nobusuke Kishi, cooperating with Tōseiha proponents of total war mobilization such as Akinaga Tsukizo, Suzuki Teiichi, and Ikeda Sumihisa, went on to found the civilian National Defense Brotherhood in the final phase of the war. Unlike the Tōseiha's military officer corps, the National Defense Brotherhood drew on agrarian politicians and opposed the Suzuki cabinet's efforts to end the war, with Kishi's faction implicated in the failed Kyūjō incident of August 1945. Kishi and his followers met to formally disband the organization on 15 August 1945, the same day Japan's surrender was broadcast.

== Legacy ==
Today, some historical and academic perspectives have suggested that some aspects of the Tōseiha were inherited by the Liberal Democratic Party, particularly through Nobusuke Kishi and the Reform bureaucrats. The bureaucratic, centralist and conservative philosophies championed by the Tōseiha were embraced by the post-war conservative establishment, many of whom were pre-war elites who were reintegrated back into politics, forming the foundation of the LDP's iron triangle of bureaucrats, businesses and politicians. The Tōseiha vision of Japanese industrialization and modernization was also peacefully achieved with the post-war Japanese economic miracle.

== See also ==
- Kōdōha
