= Kōki Hirota =

Prime Minister of Japan from 1936 to 1937

Junior Second Rank Kōki Hirota
- 廣田 弘毅
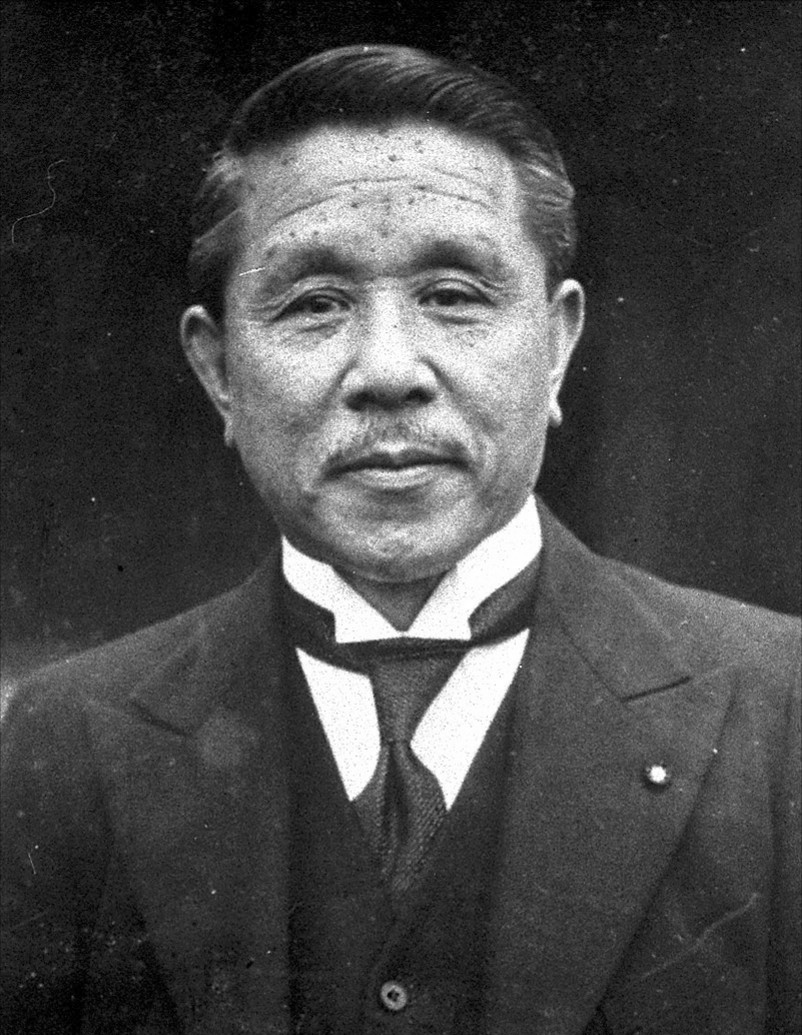
- Portrait, c. 1936

Prime Minister of Japan
- In office 9 March 1936 – 2 February 1937
- Monarch: Hirohito
- Preceded by: Keisuke Okada
- Succeeded by: Senjūrō Hayashi

Minister for Foreign Affairs
- In office 4 June 1937 – 26 May 1938
- Prime Minister: Fumimaro Konoe
- Preceded by: Naotake Satō
- Succeeded by: Kazushige Ugaki
- In office 14 September 1933 – 2 April 1936
- Prime Minister: Saitō Makoto; Keisuke Okada; Himself
- Preceded by: Uchida Kōsai
- Succeeded by: Hachirō Arita

Member of the House of Peers
- In office 31 May 1937 – 13 December 1945 Nominated by the Emperor

Personal details
- Born: 14 February 1878 Chūō-ku, Fukuoka, Japan
- Died: 23 December 1948 (aged 70) Sugamo Prison, Tokyo, Japan
- Party: Independent
- Spouse: Shizuko Hirota (m. 1905; died 1946)
- Education: Tokyo Imperial University
- Criminal information
- Status: Executed by hanging
- Convictions: Crimes against peace War crimes
- Trial: International Military Tribunal for the Far East
- Penalty: Death

Kōki Hirota (廣田 弘毅, Hirota Kōki; 14 February 1878 – 23 December 1948) was a Japanese diplomat and politician who served as prime minister of Japan from 1936 to 1937. He was executed for war crimes committed during the Second Sino-Japanese War at the Tokyo Trials.

Born in Fukuoka, Hirota attended the Tokyo Imperial University and graduated with a law degree. Afterwards he entered the Ministry of Foreign Affairs and became a career diplomat, serving as minister to the Netherlands and ambassador to the Soviet Union, among other posts. In 1933, Hirota became foreign minister in the cabinet of Saitō Makoto, and retained the position when Keisuke Okada was appointed prime minister.

In 1936, following the February 26 incident, Hirota succeeded Okada as prime minister. His premiership saw the Japanese military's growing control over the civilian government, as well as the signing of the Anti-Comintern Pact. He was forced to resign under Army pressure less than a year later and was succeeded by Senjūrō Hayashi. Later he briefly served as foreign minister under Fumimaro Konoe before retiring. In 1945, he returned to government service and led Japanese peace negotiations with the Soviet Union.

Following Japan's surrender at the end of the Second World War, Hirota was arrested as a Class A war criminal and brought before the International Military Tribunal for the Far East. He was found guilty of war crimes and sentenced to death by hanging, the only civilian executed as a result of the proceedings.

== Early life ==
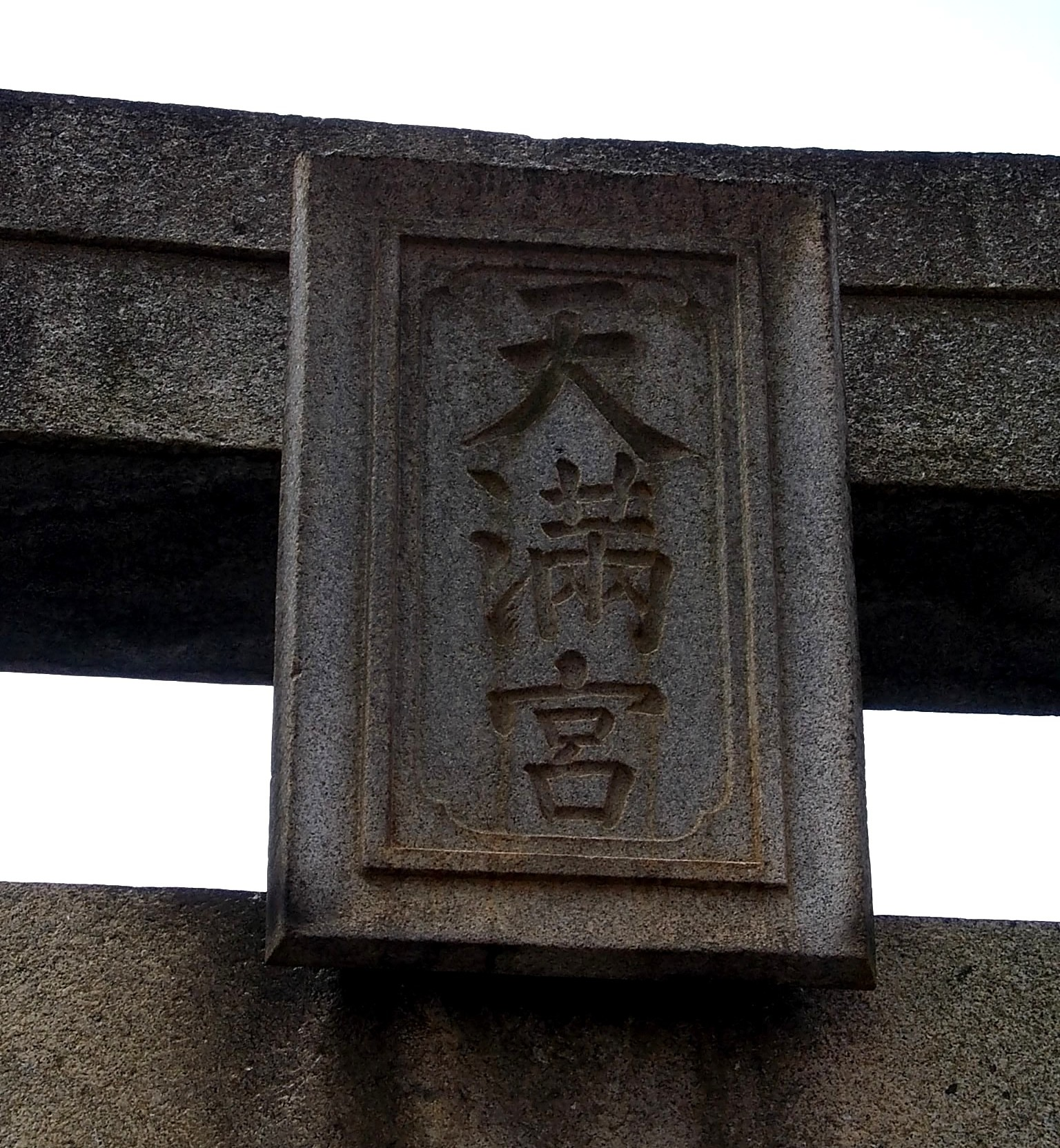
Name plate of Suikyo Shrine written by Hirota at the age of 11

Hirota was born on 14 February 1878, in Kaji-machi dori (鍛冶町通り) in what is now part of Chūō-ku, Fukuoka, Fukuoka Prefecture, to stonemason Hirota Tokubei (廣田 徳平). His father had been adopted into the Hirota family of stonemasons.

Tokubei married Take (タケ), a daughter of the president of a Japanese noodle company. On 14 February 1878, the couple had a son, whom Tokubei named Jōtarō (丈太郎). They later had three more children. Tokubei's name is engraved on the epigraph that recognized masons who contributed to the construction of a statue of Emperor Kameyama in Higashi kōen (東公園) in Fukuoka city.

Hirota's writing was recognized as good from a young age since the name plate of the torii gate of Suikyo Shrine was written by Hirota when he was 11. After attending Shuyukan, he continued his education at Tokyo Imperial University and graduated with a law degree. One of his classmates was the postwar Prime Minister Shigeru Yoshida.

== First diplomatic career ==
After graduation, Hirota entered the Ministry of Foreign Affairs to become a career diplomat, and he served in a number of overseas posts. In 1923, he became director of the Europe and America Department of the Foreign Ministry. After he was minister to the Netherlands, he was ambassador to the Soviet Union from 1928 to 1932.

In 1933, Hirota became Foreign Minister in the cabinet of Prime Minister Saitō Makoto, just after Japan had withdrawn from the League of Nations. He retained the position in the subsequent cabinet of Admiral Keisuke Okada.

Upon assuming the post, Hirota explicitly pursued a stated policy of Harmony Diplomacy (Kyōwa Gaikō) to stabilize Japan's international isolation. He attempted to negotiate with the United States, Britain, the Soviet Union, and China to ease tensions, believing diplomacy should embrace "the great spirit of international harmony." Despite these diplomatic efforts, Western powers, including the Roosevelt administration, remained distrustful of Japan's expansion and ignored his attempts at securing treaties.

As Foreign Minister, Hirota negotiated the purchase of the Chinese Eastern Railway in Manchuria from Soviet interests. He also promulgated the Hirota Sangensoku (the Three Principles by Hirota) on 28 October 1935 as the definitive statement of Japan's position towards China. The three principles were the establishment of a Japan–China–Manchukuo bloc, the organization of a Sino-Japanese common front against the spread of communism, and the suppression of anti-Japanese activities within China. These principle marked a sharp turn in Hirota's diplomacy, essentially acting as an official recognition of the Army's actions in North China, reversing any hopes for reconciliation. Hirota argued that warlordism and Chinese Communism represented a "festering sore deep down in the bosom of Eastern Asia" that threatened "all Asian races with sure and inescapable death" and considered further military engagement in China to be "heroic surgery," rather than invasion.

== Premiership (1936–1937) ==
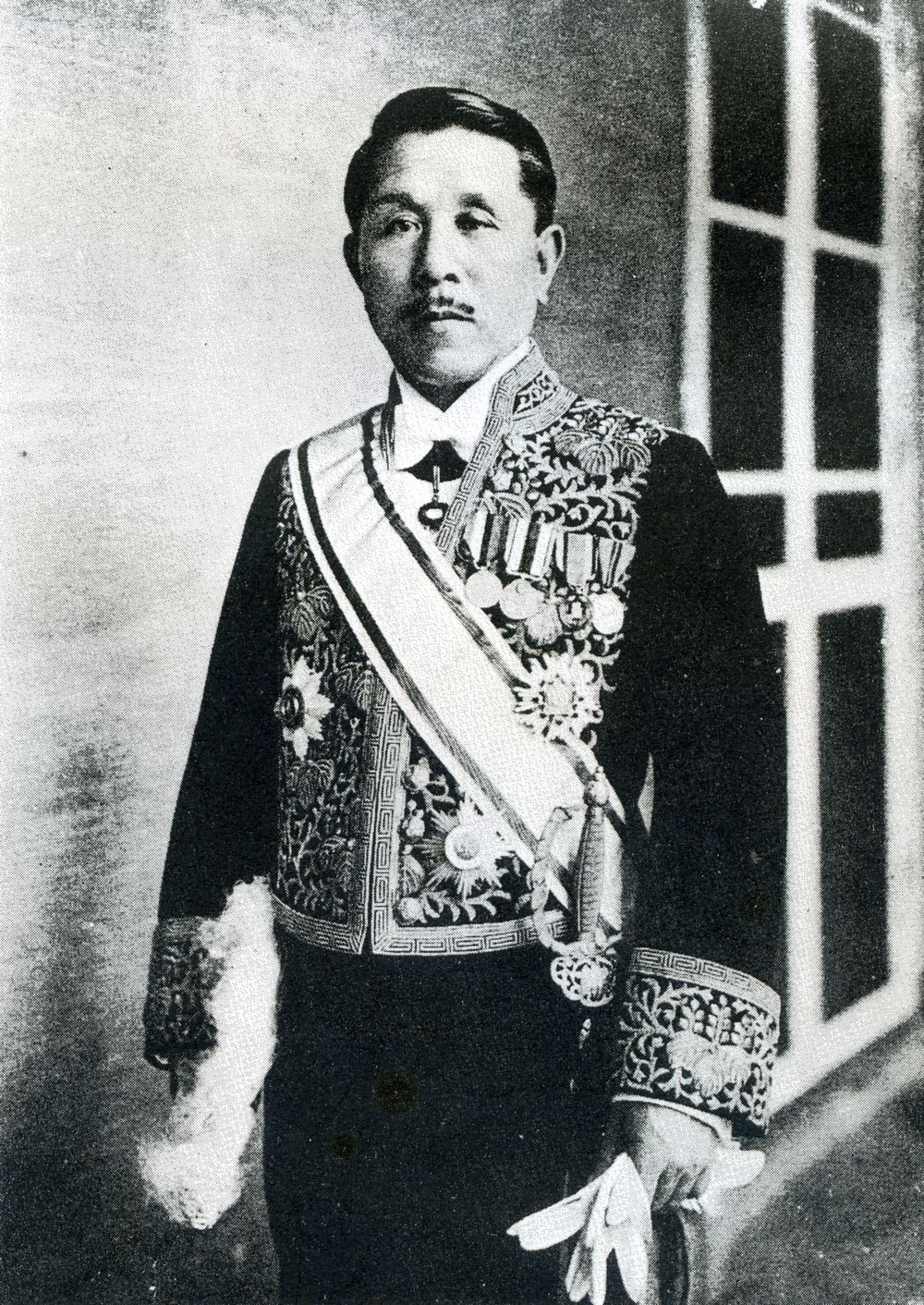
- Hirota as foreign minister, 1933
- Premiership of Kōki Hirota; 9 March 1936 – 2 February 1937
- Monarch: Emperor Shōwa
- Cabinet: Hirota Cabinet
- Party: Independent
- Seat: Naikaku Sōri Daijin Kantei
- Emblem of the Government of Japan

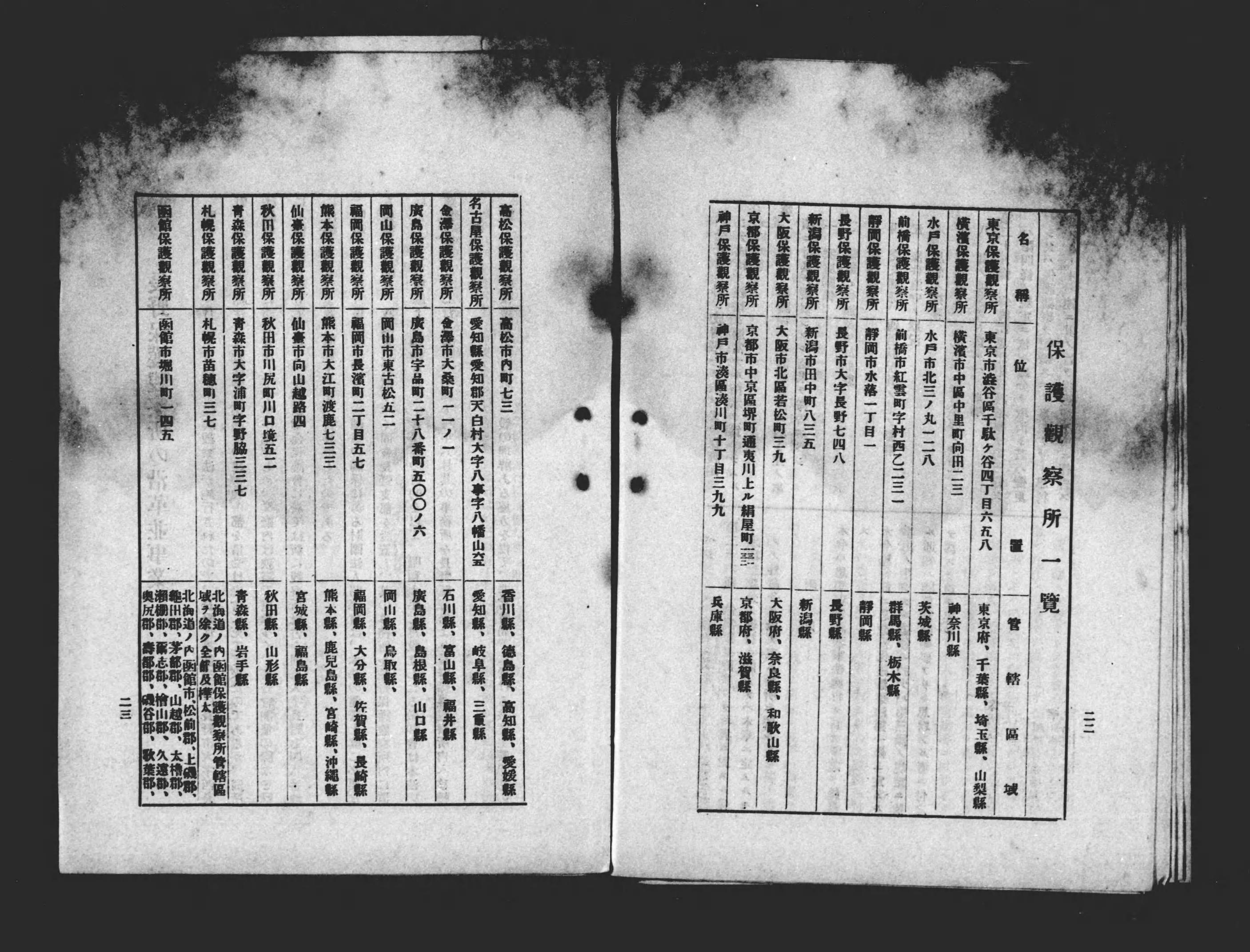
List of Ideological Criminal Probation Offices installed by the Ideological Criminal Probation Act established under the Hirota Cabinet in 1936.

In 1936, following the failed 26 February incident, the Tōseiha's political control was empowered further over the civilian government. Hirota was selected to replace Okada as Prime Minister of Japan under this military supremacy. Hirota placated the military by reinstating the system by which only active-duty Army or Navy officers (see Minister of War Military Attache System) could serve in the Cabinet posts of war minister or navy minister. The military, via the institution of the Imperial General Headquarters, had abused the system in the past to bring down civilian governments.

During his premiership, Hirota oversaw the signing of the Anti-Comintern Pact in November 1936. He aggressively sought to have Chiang Kai-shek's Nationalist Government join this anti-communist alliance to achieve a "Sino-Japanese partnership." However, when China rejected this demand, Hirota's vision for an anti-communist partnership collapsed

Hirota's term lasted for slightly less than a year. He resigned after a disagreement with Hisaichi Terauchi, who was serving as the war minister, over a speech by the Rikken Seiyūkai representative Kunimatsu Hamada criticizing military interference in politics. Kazushige Ugaki was appointed as his successor but was unable to form the government because of army opposition. In February 1937, Senjūrō Hayashi was appointed to replace Hirota as prime minister.

== Second diplomatic career ==
Hirota soon returned to government service as foreign minister under Hayashi's successor, Prince Fumimaro Konoe. By the time of the Trautmann mediation in early 1938, the rational diplomat of 1933 had been entirely subsumed by the militaristic environment. When deciding the fate of the peace negotiations, Hirota aggressively allied with military hardliners like War Minister Sugiyama to terminate the mediation, overriding the caution of military moderates like General Tada. He eventually retired in 1938.

In 1945, however, Hirota returned to government service to lead Japanese peace negotiations with the Soviet Union. At the time, Japan and the Soviet Union were still under a non-aggression pact even though all other Allied Powers had declared war on Japan. Hirota attempted to persuade Joseph Stalin's government to stay out of the war, but the Soviet Union ultimately declared war on Japan in between the atomic bombings of Hiroshima and Nagasaki.

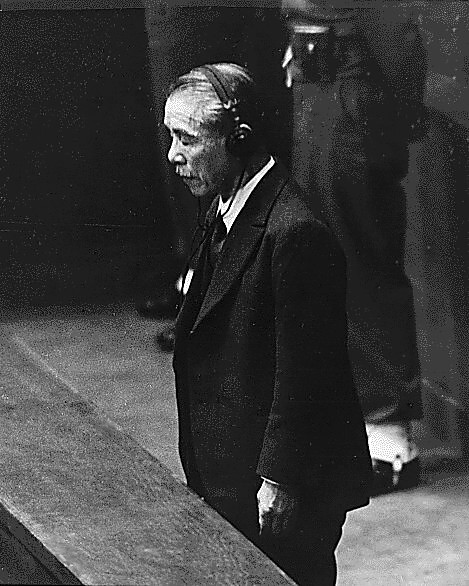
Koki Hirota listening to his death sentence being read by Sir William Webb, 1948

== Postwar ==
Following Japan's surrender, Hirota was arrested as a Class A war criminal and brought before the International Military Tribunal for the Far East (IMTFE). He offered no defense and was found guilty of the following charges:

- Count 1 (waging wars of aggression, and war or wars in violation of international law)
- Count 27 (waging unprovoked war against the Republic of China)
- Count 55 (disregard for duty to prevent breaches of the laws of war)

He was sentenced to death by hanging and was executed at Sugamo Prison. The severity of his sentence remains controversial, as Hirota was the only civilian executed as a result of the IMTFE proceedings.

As foreign minister, Hirota had received regular reports from the War Ministry about the military's atrocities, such as the Nanjing Massacre, but lacked any authority over the offending military units themselves. Nonetheless, the tribunal condemned Hirota's failure to insist for the Japanese Cabinet act to put an end to the atrocities.

Hirota was a civilian bureaucrat and was popular among the public, which led to a petition for a reduced sentence gathering 29,985 signatures in Japan. Even today, his name is often mentioned when the Tokyo Trials are debated in Japan as a "victor's justice" trial. Generally, he is often portrayed as a minister who was opposed to the war but unable to resist pressure from the military. He is also the protagonist of the novel and drama "Rakujitsu Moyu" ("The Setting Sun Burns").

== Honours ==
- Grand Cordon of the Order of the Sacred Treasure (1933)
- Grand Cordon of the Order of the Rising Sun (1934)

== Sources ==
- Frank, Richard B. Downfall: The End of the Imperial Japanese Empire. Penguin (Non-Classics); Reissue edition (2001). ISBN 0-14-100146-1
- Maga, Timothy P. Judgment at Tokyo: The Japanese War Crimes Trials. University of Kentucky (2001). ISBN 0-8131-2177-9
- Minear, Richard H. Victors' Justice: The Tokyo War Crimes Trial. University of Michigan (2001). ISBN 1-929280-06-8
- The Complete Transcripts of the Proceedings of the International Military Tribunal for the Far East, reprinted in R. John Pritchard and Sonia Magbanua Zaide (eds.), The Tokyo War Crimes Trial, vol. 20 (Garland Publishing: New York and London 1981)
- Toland, John. The Rising Sun: The Decline and Fall of the Japanese Empire, 1936–1945. Modern Library; Reprint edition (2003). ISBN 0-8129-6858-1

Political offices
Preceded by Kosai Uchida	Minister for Foreign Affairs; September 1933 – April 1936	Succeeded by Hachirō Arita
Preceded by Keisuke Okada	Prime Minister of Japan; March 1936 – February 1937	Succeeded by Senjūrō Hayashi
Preceded by Naotake Satō	Minister for Foreign Affairs; June 1937 – May 1938	Succeeded by Kazushige Ugaki
