= Double Leaf Society =

Japanese military secret society of the 1920s

The Double Leaf Society (双葉会(陸軍), Futabakai) was a Japanese military secret society of the 1920s.

The Futabakai was one of many ultranationalist secret societies in Japan which had arisen within the Japanese military, from the Meiji period through World War II. The Futabakai consisted mainly of mid-level officers (colonels and majors) who had graduated from the Imperial Japanese Army Academy between 1907–1916, who now found their prospects for promotion to the rank of general very slim due to domination of the upper ranks of the military by officers from the former Chōshū domain. Although initially founded to purge the "corrupt" elements out the Imperial Japanese Army, it later became associated with foreign policy issues, and influenced by the writings of Ikki Kita and Okawa Shumei.

This historical Futabakai has no connection with the modern yakuza organization based in Fukuoka.

== See also ==
- Secret society
