= Jinzaburō Masaki =

Japanese general (1876–1956)

- 真崎 甚三郎
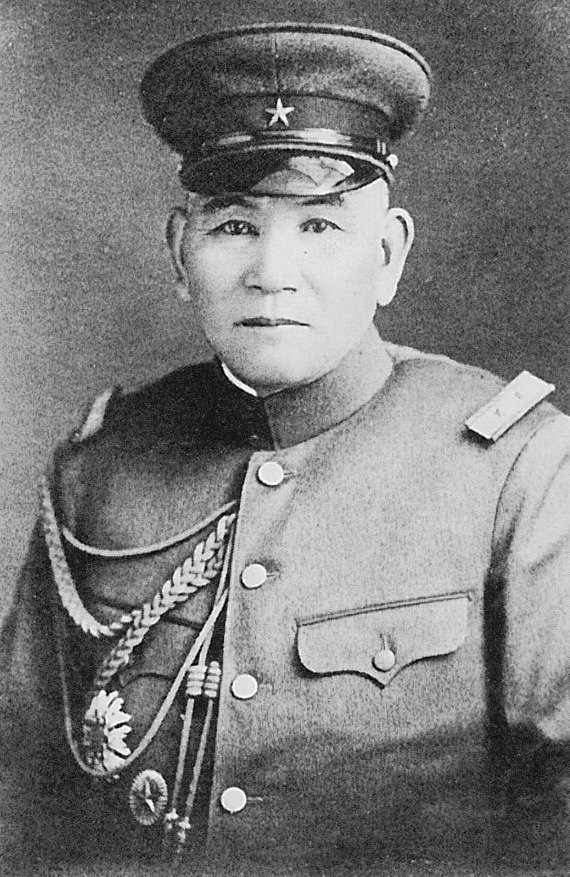
- Born: 27 November 1876; Kanzaki, Saga, Japan
- Died: 31 August 1956 (aged 79); Setagaya, Tokyo, Japan
- Military career
- Allegiance: Empire of Japan
- Branch: Imperial Japanese Army
- Service years: 1897–1935
- Rank: General
- Commands: IJA 8th Division, IJA 1st Division

Jinzaburō Masaki (真崎 甚三郎, Masaki Jinzaburō; 27 November 1876 – 31 August 1956) was a general in the Imperial Japanese Army in World War II. He was regarded as a leader of the Imperial Way Faction within the Japanese military.

== Biography ==
Born in Saga Prefecture in 1876, Masaki graduated from the 9th class of the Imperial Japanese Army Academy in 1897 and was commissioned as a second lieutenant in the IJA 46th Infantry Regiment in June 1898. He was assigned to Tsushima Guard Battalion from May 1899 until November 1900, when he was promoted to lieutenant in the IJA 46th Infantry Regiment. He was sent to the front during the Russo-Japanese War in February 1904, and served in Manchuria until December 1905. During this period, he was promoted to captain in June 1904; however, he found the war a highly traumatizing experience, and after his return to Japan, Masaki wrote that he had considered resigning from the Army and entering the Buddhist priesthood.

Instead, Masaki entered the 19th class of the Army Staff College and graduated with honors at the top of his class in December 1905. An infantry officer, he was promoted to the rank of major in 1909 before being sent abroad as a military attaché to Germany from 1911 to 1914. He was promoted to lieutenant colonel in November 1914.

After his return to Japan, Masaki was appointed as a staff officer in the Inspectorate General of Military Training where he served from 1916 to 1920, becoming a colonel in 1918. Appointed chief of Military Administration Bureau of the War Ministry in 1920, he was given command of the 1st Imperial Guards Regiment the following year. Upon his promotion to major general in 1922, Masaki served as a Brigade commander until becoming director of curriculum at the Japanese Army Academy, eventually becoming commandant by 1925.

Promoted to lieutenant general in 1927, Masaki was placed in command of the IJA 8th Division and posted at Hirosaki, Aomori for two years before being transferred to IJA 1st Division in Tokyo until 1931. Serving as vice chief of the Imperial Japanese Army General Staff, Masaki won promotion to full general in 1933 and appointed Inspector General of Military Education between 1934 and 1936. He retired from active military service in 1936.

Masaki was active in the internal political factions within the Japanese Army. He was an early member of the radical Imperial Way Faction led by Sadao Araki. With Heisuke Yanagawa and Hideyoshi Obata, the group merged with the rival Tōseiha faction under Kazushige Ugaki to dominate the Japanese army throughout the 1930s until World War II. A supporter of an alliance with Nazi Germany and Fascist Italy, Masaki continued his involvement with the Imperial Way Faction until his forced retirement though political maneuvers by General Tetsuzan Nagata. Dissatisfaction with Masaki's forced retirement resulted in the assassination of Nagata the following year which, in turn, led to the February 26 Incident of 1936. Masaki was arrested and court-martialed for his alleged participation, but was acquitted.

Masaki returned to his native Saga Prefecture to serve on the Prefectural Board of Education in 1941. Following the end of World War II, Masaki was arrested as a suspected war criminal. He was released from prison due to a lack of evidence in 1947.

Military offices
Preceded by Jōtarō Watanabe	Commander of the Taiwan Army of Japan; 1931–1932	Succeeded by Nobuyuki Abe
Preceded by Harushige Ninomiya	Vice Chief of Army Staff; 1932–1934	Succeeded by Kenkichi Ueda
Preceded by Senjūrō Hayashi	Inspector-General of Military Training; 1934–1935	Succeeded by Jōtarō Watanabe
