= Inspectorate General of Military Training =

Training division in the Imperial Japanese Army

The Inspectorate General of Military Training (教育総監部, Kyōiku sōkanbu) was a section of the Imperial Japanese Army charged with military education and training in the army, except military aviation training. It was headed by an inspector general who was responsible for overseeing technical and tactical training, and who reported directly to the Emperor of Japan via the Imperial General Headquarters rather than to the Army Minister or the Chief of the Imperial Japanese Army General Staff Office. The position of Inspector-General of Military Training was thus the third most powerful position within the Japanese Army.

== History ==
The office of Inspectorate General of Military Training was established 20 January 1898, to provide a unified command for the Imperial Japanese Army Academy, and the various specialized weaponry and technical training schools, and the military preparatory schools located in various locations around the country. It also had broad powers of oversight over Army logistics, transportation, and support issues. Due to its political power, the post was highly sought after by Army senior leadership, and a factional dispute over succession was one of the triggering factors of the February 26 Incident. The post was abolished with the dissolution of the Imperial Japanese Army after the surrender of Japan at the end of World War II.

== Organization ==
- Headquarters
  - Section 1. General Affairs (Personnel, Accounting, etc.)
  - Section 2. General Training
  - Section 3. Research and Training Regulations
  - Section 4. Special Schools
- Artillery
- Military engineering
- Military logistics
- Cavalry (-> Armoured warfare from 1941)
- Chemical warfare (from 1941)
- Military communications (from 1941)
- Anti-aircraft warfare (from 1945)

Also from 1941, a 2nd Bureau was added to the organizational structure, to specialize in armored car training. However, military aviation always remained outside the jurisdiction of the Inspectorate.

== List of Inspectors-General of Military Training ==
	Name	From	To
1	Field Marshal Masatake Terauchi	22 January 1898	25 April 1900
2	Field Marshal Michitsura Nozu	25 April 1900	14 January 1904
3	Field Marshal Masatake Terauchi	14 January 1904	9 May 1905
4	General Kanjirō Nishi	9 May 1905	21 December 1908
5	General Hisanao Ōshima	21 December 1908	6 September 1911
6	General Nobuoki Asada	6 September 1911	22 April 1914
7	Field Marshal Yūsaku Uehara	22 April 1914	17 December 1915
8	General Hyōe Ichinohe	17 December 1915	26 August 1919
9	General Kikuzō Ōtani	26 August 1919	28 December 1920
10	General Yoshifuru Akiyama	28 December 1920	17 March 1923
11	General Jirō Ōba	17 March 1923	2 March 1926
12	General Shinnosuke Kikuchi	2 March 1926	22 August 1927
13	Field Marshal Baron Nobuyoshi Mutō	22 August 1927	26 May 1932
14	General Senjūrō Hayashi	26 May 1932	23 January 1934
15	General Jinzaburō Masaki	23 January 1934	16 July 1935
16	General Jōtarō Watanabe	16 July 1935	26 February 1936
17	General Yoshikazu Nishi	26 February 1936	1 August 1936
18	Field Marshal Hajime Sugiyama	1 August 1936	9 February 1937
19	Field Marshal Hisaichi Terauchi	9 February 1937	26 August 1937
20	Field Marshal Shunroku Hata	26 August 1937	14 February 1938
21	General Rikichi Andō	14 February 1938	30 April 1938
22	General Toshizō Nishio	30 April 1938	14 October 1940
23	General Otozō Yamada	14 October 1940	18 July 1944
24	Field Marshal Hajime Sugiyama	18 July 1944	22 November 1944
25	Field Marshal Shunroku Hata	23 November 1944	7 April 1945
26	General Kenji Doihara	7 April 1945	25 August 1945
27	General Sadamu Shimomura	25 August 1945	15 October 1945
