= Zaibatsu =

Conglomerates in the Empire of Japan

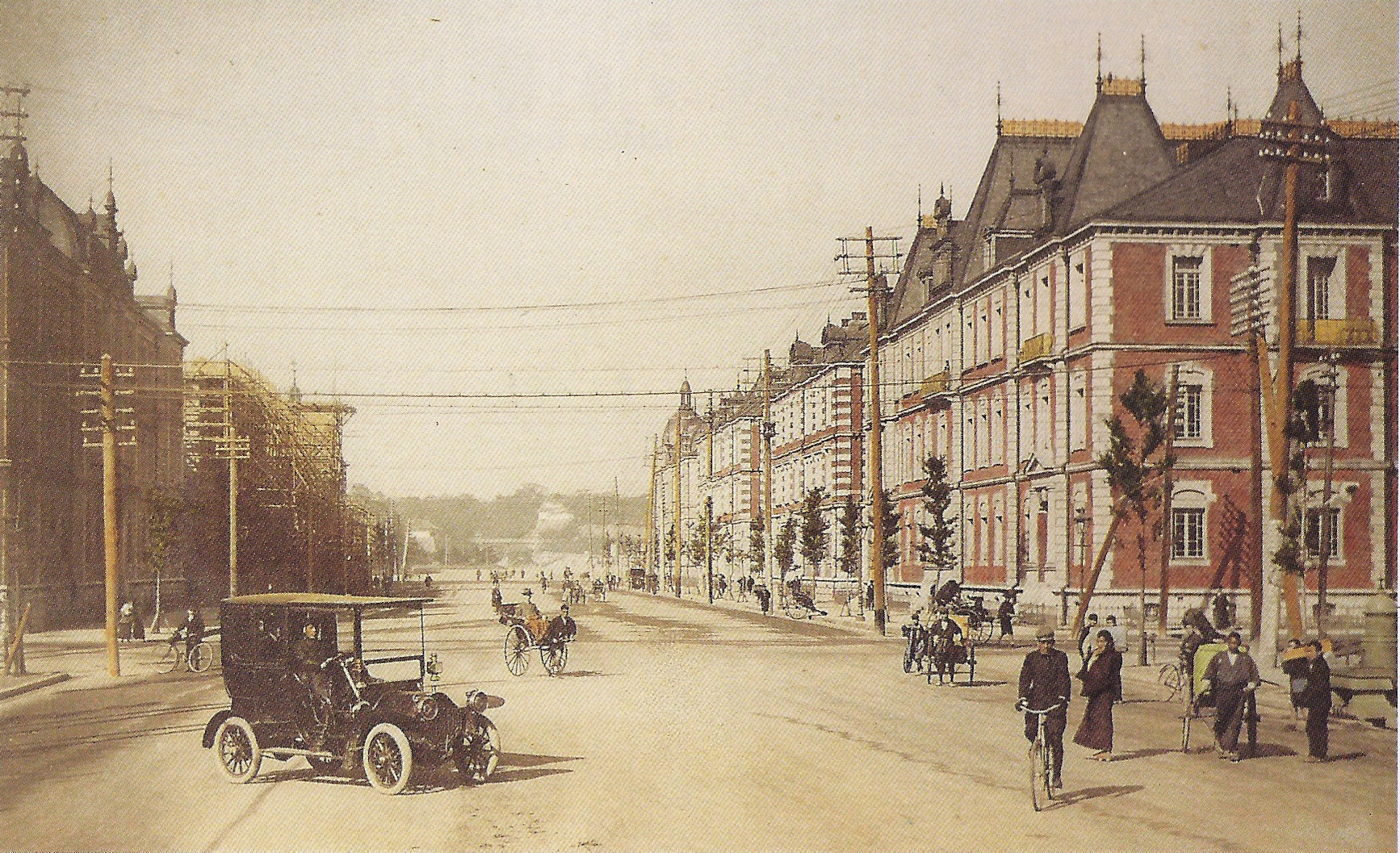
Marunouchi headquarters for the Mitsubishi zaibatsu, 1909

Zaibatsu (Japanese: 財閥; IPA: [d͡za̠iba̠t͡sɨ]; lit. 'asset clique') is a Japanese term referring to industrial and financial vertically integrated business conglomerates in the Empire of Japan, whose influence and size allowed control over significant parts of the Japanese economy from the Meiji era to World War II. A zaibatsu's general structure included a family-owned holding company on top, and a bank which financed the other, mostly industrial subsidiaries within them. Although the zaibatsu played an important role in the Japanese economy beginning in 1868, they especially increased in number and importance following the Russo-Japanese War, World War I, and Japan's subsequent attempt to conquer East Asia and the Pacific Rim during the interwar period and World War II. After World War II, they were dissolved by the Allied occupation forces and succeeded by the keiretsu (groups of banks, manufacturers, suppliers, and distributors). Equivalents to the zaibatsu can still be found in other countries, such as the chaebol conglomerates of South Korea.

== Terminology ==
The term zaibatsu was coined in 19th century Japan from the Sino-Japanese roots zai 財 ('asset', 'wealth' from Middle Chinese dzoi) and batsu 閥 ('clique', 'group', from Middle Chinese bjot). Although zaibatsu themselves existed from the 19th century, the term was not in common use until after World War I. By definition, the zaibatsu were large family-controlled vertical monopolies consisting of a holding company on top, with a wholly owned banking subsidiary providing finance, and several industrial subsidiaries dominating specific sectors of a market, either solely or through a number of subsidiary companies.

== Significance ==
The Big Three

Mitsubishi

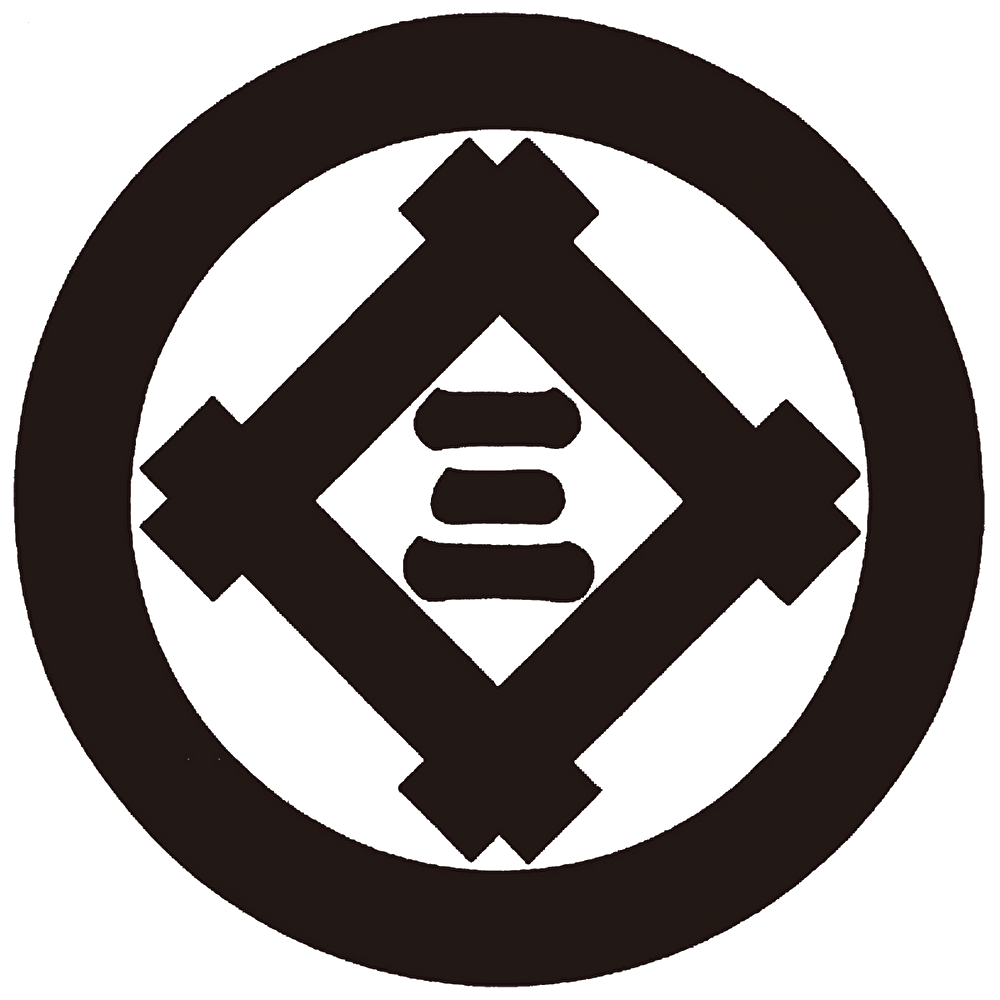
Mitsui

Sumitomo

The zaibatsu were the heart of economic and industrial activity within the Empire of Japan, and held great influence over Japanese national and foreign policies. The Rikken Seiyūkai political party was regarded as an extension of the Mitsui group, which also had very strong connections with the Imperial Japanese Army. Likewise, the Rikken Minseitō was connected to the Mitsubishi group, as was the Imperial Japanese Navy.

The zaibatsu were viewed with suspicion by both the right and left of the political spectrum in the 1920s and 1930s. Although the world was in the throes of a worldwide economic depression, the zaibatsu were prospering through currency speculation, maintenance of low labour costs and military procurement. Matters came to a head in the League of Blood Incident of March 1932, with the assassination of the managing director of Mitsui, after which the zaibatsu attempted to improve their public image through increased charity work.

== History and development ==
The zaibatsu were at the heart of economic and industrial activity within the Empire of Japan since Japanese industrialization accelerated during the Meiji era. They held great influence over Japanese national and foreign policies which only increased following the Japanese victory over Russia in the Russo-Japanese War of 1904–1905 and Japan's victories over Germany during World War I. During the interwar period the zaibatsu aided Japanese militarism and benefited from the conquest of East Asia by receiving lucrative contracts.

When Japan emerged from the self-imposed, pre-Meiji era sakoku in 1867, Western countries already had very dominant and internationally significant companies. Standard Oil, Carnegie Steel Company, AT&T, General Electric, Western Union, Friedrich Krupp, Thyssen, Robert Bosch GmbH, Lloyd's of London, Reckitt & Sons and the East India Company were very dominant and were the major players in international trade. The British Empire, under the leadership of the Baring family, the Rothschild family and the Guinness family, as well as Imperial Germany and other Western countries were colonizing much of the undeveloped world, and Japanese companies realized that in order to remain sovereign, they needed to develop the same methodology and mindset of Western companies, and the zaibatsu emerged.

=== Big Four ===
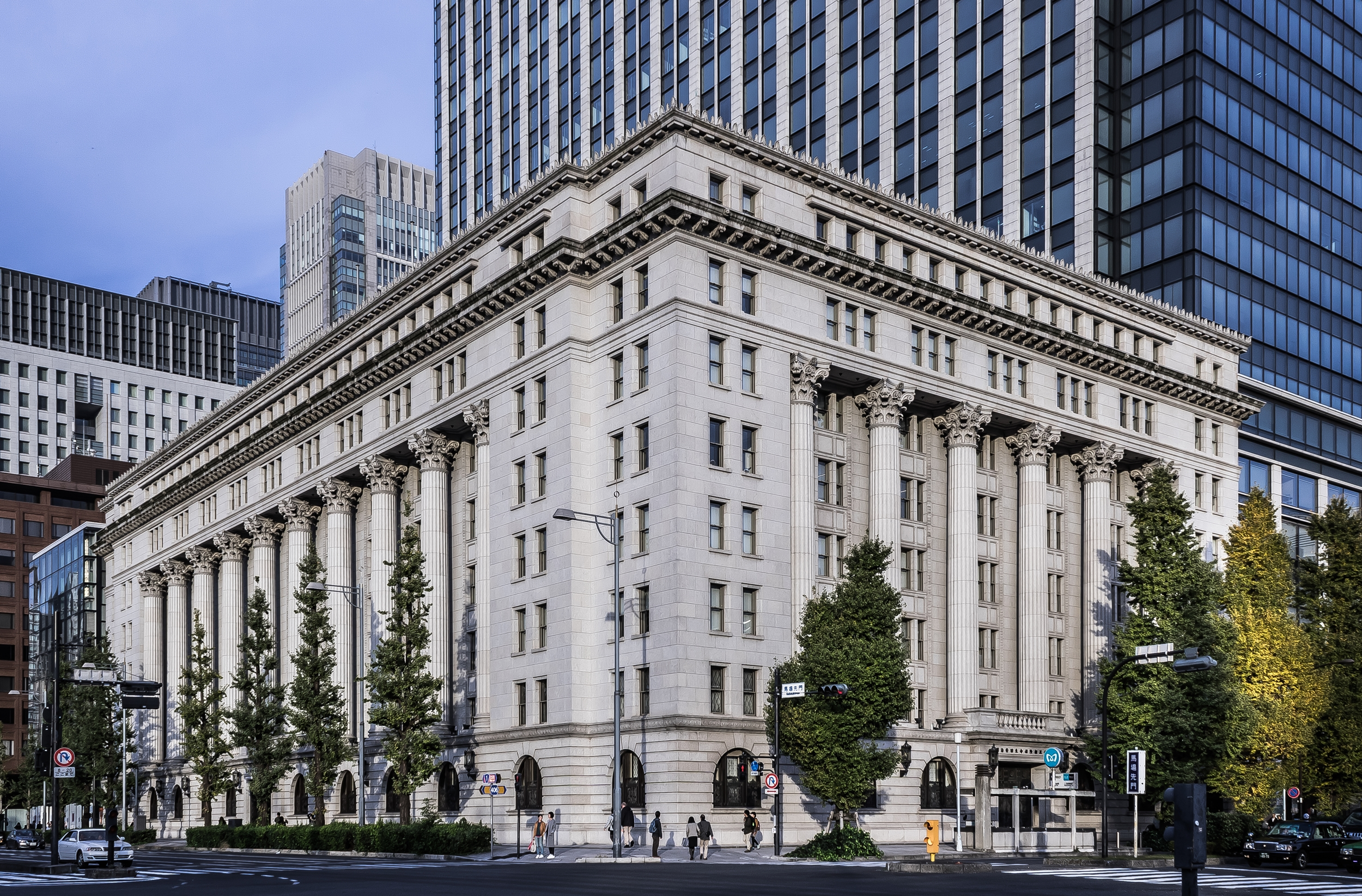
Meiji Seimei Kan building, owned by the Meiji Yasuda Life Insurance Company of the Mitsubishi Group

The "Big Four" zaibatsu (四大財閥; Yondai Zaibatsu) of, in chronological order of founding, Sumitomo, Mitsui, Mitsubishi, and Yasuda were the most significant zaibatsu groups. Two of them, Sumitomo and Mitsui, had roots in the Edo period while Mitsubishi and Yasuda traced their origins to the Meiji Restoration. Throughout Meiji to Shōwa, the government employed their financial powers and expertise for various endeavors, including tax collection, military procurement and foreign trade.

=== New Zaibatsu ===
Beyond the Big Four, consensus is lacking as to which companies can be called zaibatsu, and which cannot. After the Russo-Japanese War, a number of so-called "second-tier" zaibatsu also emerged, mostly as the result of business conglomerations and the awarding of lucrative military contracts. Some more famous second-tier zaibatsu include the Ōkura, Furukawa, and Nakajima groups.

The early zaibatsu permitted some public shareholding of some subsidiary companies, but never of the top holding company or key subsidiaries.

The monopolistic business practices by the zaibatsu resulted in a closed circle of companies until Japanese industrial expansion in Northeast China (known as Manchukuo during era of Japanese colonial expansion) began in the 1930s, which allowed for the rise of a number of new groups (shinko zaibatsu), including Nissan. These new zaibatsu differed from the traditional zaibatsu only in that they were not controlled by specific families, but not in terms of business practices.

=== Postwar dissolution ===
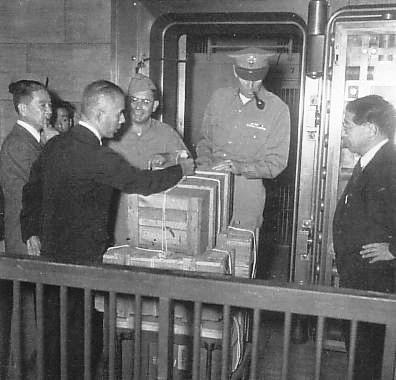
Seizure of the zaibatsu families assets, 1946

The zaibatsu had been viewed with some ambivalence by the Japanese military, which nationalized a significant portion of their production capability during World War II. Remaining assets were also highly damaged by destruction during the war.

Under the Allied occupation after the surrender of Japan, a partially successful attempt was made to dissolve the zaibatsu. Many of the economic advisors accompanying the SCAP administration had experience with the New Deal and were highly suspicious of monopolies and restrictive business practices, which they felt to be both inefficient, and to be a form of corporatocracy (and thus inherently anti-democratic).

During the occupation of Japan, sixteen zaibatsu were targeted for complete dissolution, and twenty-six more for reorganization after dissolution. Among the zaibatsu that were targeted for dissolution in 1947 were Asano, Furukawa, Nakajima, Nissan, Nomura, and Okura. In addition, Yasuda dissolved itself in 1946. The controlling families' assets were seized, holding companies eliminated, and interlocking directorships, essential to the old system of inter-company coordination, were outlawed. The Matsushita Electric Industrial Company (which later took the name Panasonic), while not a zaibatsu, was originally also targeted for breakup, but was saved by a petition signed by 15,000 of its union workers and their families.

However, complete dissolution of the zaibatsu was never achieved, mostly because the U.S. government rescinded the orders in an effort to reindustrialize Japan as a bulwark against communism in Asia. Zaibatsu as a whole were widely considered to be beneficial to the Japanese economy and government, and the opinions of the Japanese public, of the zaibatsu workers and management, and of the entrenched bureaucracy regarding plans for zaibatsu dissolution ranged from unenthusiastic to disapproving. Additionally, the changing politics of the occupation during the reverse course served as a crippling, if not terminal, roadblock to zaibatsu elimination.

=== Modern-day influence ===
Today, the influence of the zaibatsu can still be seen in the form of financial groups, institutions, and larger companies whose origins reach back to the original zaibatsu, often sharing the same original family names (for example, Sumitomo Mitsui Banking Corporation). However, some argue that the "old mechanisms of financial and administrative control" that zaibatsu once enjoyed have been destroyed. Despite the absence of an actual sweeping change to the existence of large industrial conglomerates in Japan, the zaibatsu's previous vertically integrated chain of command, ending with a single family, has now widely been displaced by the horizontal relationships of association and coordination characteristic of keiretsu (系列). Keiretsu, meaning "series" or "subsidiary", could be interpreted as being suggestive of this difference.

The term zaibatsu has been used often in books, comics, games, and films to refer to large and usually sinister Japanese corporations, often involved in shady dealings or with connections to the yakuza. This may provide a plot hook, or simply provide the background for a character from an influential Japanese family.

== List of zaibatsu ==
The "big four"

- Mitsubishi (三菱財閥)
- Mitsui (三井財閥)
- Sumitomo (住友財閥)
- Yasuda (安田財閥)

Second-tier zaibatsu

- Asano (浅野財閥)
- Fujita (藤田財閥)
- Furukawa (古河財閥)
- Mori (森コンツェルン)
- Kawasaki (川崎財閥)
- Nakajima (中島飛行機)
- Nichitsu (日窒コンツェルン)
- Nissan (日産コンツェルン)
- Nisso (日曹コンツェルン)
- Nomura (野村財閥)
- Okura (大倉財閥)
- Riken (理研コンツェルン)
- Toyota (トヨタ自動車株式会社)
- Shibusawa (渋沢財閥)

Bankrupt zaibatsu

- Suzuki shoten (鈴木商店)

== See also ==
- Gunbatsu
- Big business
- Chaebol
- Concern
- Four big families of Hong Kong
- Four big families of the Republic of China
- Five big families of Taiwan
- Hong (business)
- Japanese economic miracle
- Thirteen Factories
