= Shōwa Restoration =

Notion of restoring power to Emperor Hirohito and abolishing democracy in 1930s Japan

The Shōwa Restoration (昭和維新, Shōwa Ishin) was promoted by Japanese author Ikki Kita in the 1930s, with the goal of restoring power to the newly enthroned Emperor Shōwa (Hirohito) and abolishing the liberal Taishō Democracy. The aims of the "Shōwa Restoration" were similar to the Meiji Restoration as the groups who envisioned it imagined a small group of qualified people backing up a strong Emperor. The Cherry Blossom Society envisioned such a restoration.

Imperial chrysanthemum, as well as Japanese cherry blossom, were symbols proudly displayed by the proponents of the restoration

The 1936 aborted coup known as the February 26 Incident was an attempt to bring it about, which failed because they were unable to secure the support of the Emperor. The chief conspirators surrendered in the hope to make their trial advance the cause, a hope that was foiled by the trials being conducted secretly.

Rightists continued to aim for a Shōwa Restoration in the postwar period, with the term "restoration" taking on added meaning in the wake of the emperor being stripped of his formal powers by the new 1947 Constitution and renouncing his own divinity during the occupation of Japan. The push for a Shōwa Restoration took on renewed urgency in the 1960s in the wake of the 1960 Anpo protests, which many on the right viewed as a precursor to a communist revolution in Japan. A right-wing group that attacked peaceful protesters outside the National Diet in June 1960 was named the "Restoration Action Corps" (Ishin Kōdōtai).

== Sources ==
- Harries, Meirion; Harries, Susie (1991). Soldiers of the Sun: The Rise and Fall of the Imperial Japanese Army. ISBN 0-394-56935-0.
- McClain, James L. (2002). Japan: A Modern History. ISBN 0-393-04156-5.
