= Army War College (Japan) =

Military college formed in 1882

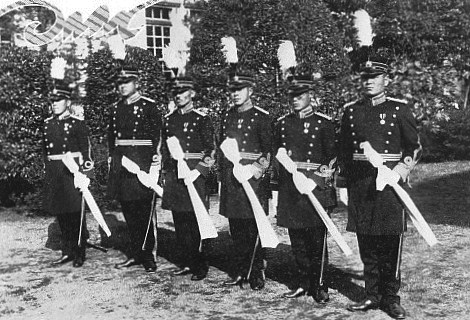
Army War College graduates in the early 1930s

The Army War College (陸軍大学校, Rikugun Daigakkō); Short form: Rikudai (陸大) of the Empire of Japan was founded in 1882 in Minato, Tokyo to modernize and Westernize the Imperial Japanese Army. Much of the empire's elite, including prime ministers during the period of Japanese militarism, were graduates of the college.

== History ==
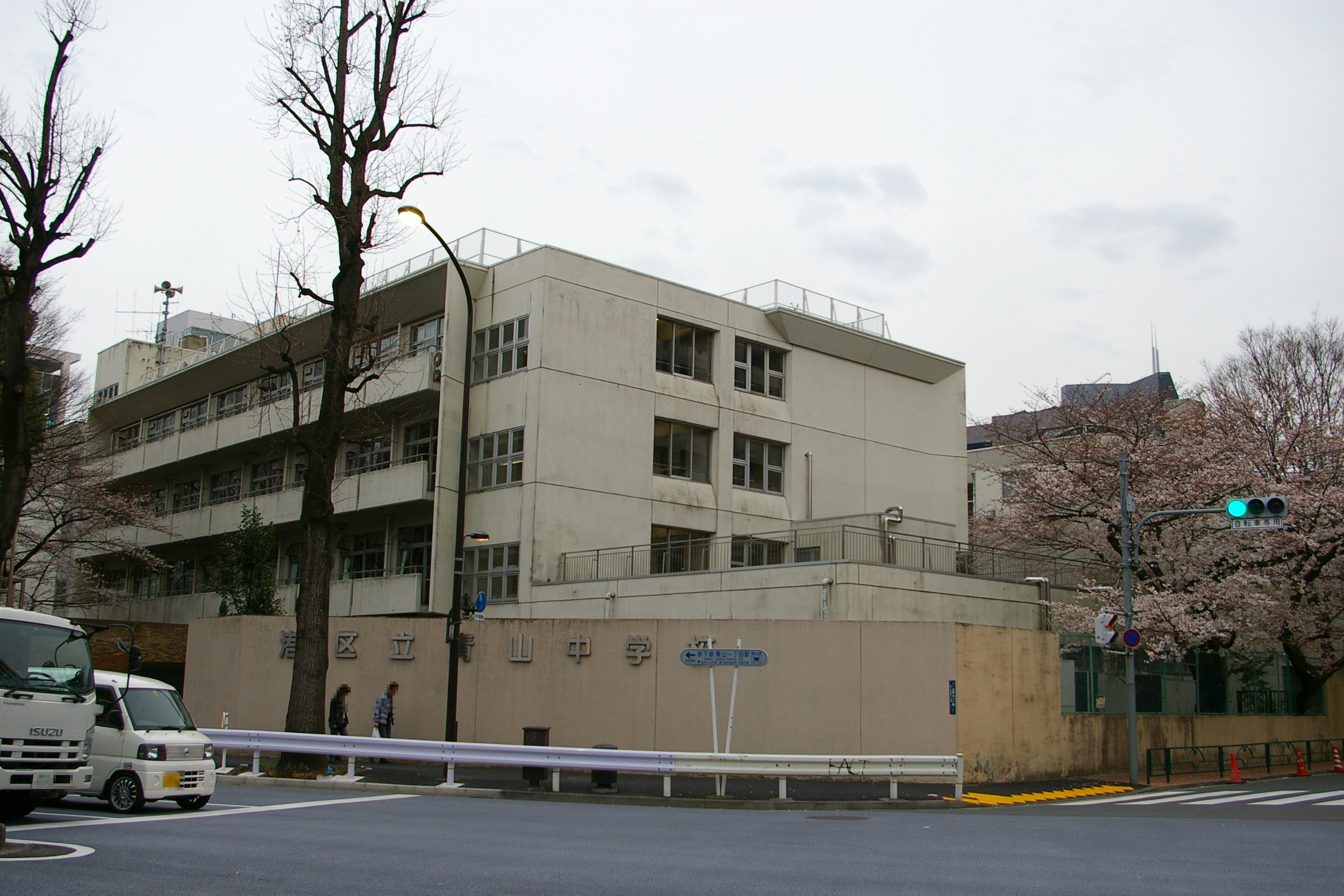
Former location of the Army War College in Kita-Aoyama, Minato, Tokyo (now Aoyama Junior High School)

Supported by influential pro-German ministers and army officers, the Army War College was modeled after the Prussian Preußische Kriegsakademie, with German officers hired as Oyatoi gaikokujin to provide training. The most prominent of these instructors was Major Klemens W.J. Meckel. He was influential in assisting in the reorganization of the standing army from a garrison-based system into a divisional system.

Reporting directly to the Imperial Japanese Army General Staff Headquarters, the college specialized initially in teaching tactics, and was regarded as the pinnacle of the Army educational system. For this reason, it accepted only previous graduates of the Imperial Japanese Army Academy who had at least two years (but not more than six years) of field experience as a lieutenant as its students, and who had typically achieved the rank of captain. Each class had from 30-35 students. Learning tended to be by rote memorization, with little encouragement for creative thinking or discussion among the students. The curriculum was a three-year course, and was considered a necessary prerequisite for future promotion to a staff rank (i.e. that of general). Each year, the six graduates with the best marks were each awarded with an Army Sword by the Emperor and are collectively known as the Army Sword Club.

The college graduated 60 classes before it was abolished following the surrender of Japan at the end of World War II. Its building in Tokyo, constructed in 1891, was demolished after the war and replaced by a municipal junior high school in 1955.

== See also ==
- Imperial Japanese Army Academy
- List of graduates of the Japanese Imperial Military Academies
- Imperial Japanese Army
- Naval War College (Japan)
