= Shandong (disambiguation) =

Shandong (Chinese: 山东) is a province of China. In Wade-Giles, it is romanized as Shan-tung.

Shandong or variation, may also refer to:

== Places ==
- Shandong Peninsula (Jiaodong Peninsula), a peninsula in northeast China that separates the Bohai Sea from the Yellow Sea, creating the Bohai Strait
- Shandong Subdistrict, Shapingba District, Chongqing
- Shandong East Circuit, a historical Chinese administrative division during the Jin Dynasty

== People ==
- Shandong people, the people and ethnicity of Shandong Province
- Tu Shandong (born 1961), Chinese engineer

== Groups, companies, organizations ==
- Shandong Airlines (SDA), an airline based out of Shandong
- Shandong Television (SDTV), headquartered in Jinan, Shandong
- Shandong Heavy Industry, a heavy equipment and automotive company based in Jinan

== Sports ==
- Shandong women's volleyball team, a women's volleyball team
- The Shandong Stars:
  - Shandong Golden Stars, a men's basketball team based in Shandong
  - Shandong Six Stars, a women's basketball team based in Shandong

== Military ==
- Shandong clique, a warlord group based in Shandong during the early twentieth century
- Battle of Shandong (1904), another name for the Battle of the Yellow Sea, a naval battle in the Russo-Japanese War
- Chinese aircraft carrier Shandong
  - Type 002 aircraft carrier, the Shandong-class aircraft carrier
- Shandong Treaty (1922), Washington Naval Conference (WNC); a treaty associated with the Nine-Power Treaty
- Shandong Incident (1927), another name for the Jinan Incident between Nationalist Chinese and the Japanese
- Shandong Column, predecessor of the 73rd Group Army

== Other uses ==
- Shandong cuisine, the cuisine found in Shandong
- Shandong (restaurant), a Chinese cuisine restaurant in Portland, Oregon
- Shandong maple (Acer truncatum), a deciduous tree found in northern China

== See also ==
- Dongshan (disambiguation)
- Dong (disambiguation)
- Shan (disambiguation)
