= Dongshan =

Dongshan (Wade–Giles: Tung-shan; generally simplified Chinese: 东山; traditional Chinese: 東山; pinyin: Dōngshān; lit. 'east mountain') may refer to:

== Places ==
- Dongshan County, Fujian
- Dongshan District, Hegang, Heilongjiang
- Tung Shan (mountain), Hong Kong
- Dongshan District, Tainan, Taiwan
- Dongshan, Changsha, a subdistrict of Yuhua District, Changsha, Hunan
- Dongshan, Huarong, a town in Huarong County, Hunan
- Dongshan, Suining, a Dong ethnic township in Suining County, Hunan
- Dongshan, Yilan (冬山鄉), township of Yilan County, Taiwan

=== Former districts ===
- Dongshan District, Guangzhou, Guangdong
- Dongshan District, Ürümqi, Xinjiang

== People ==
- Dongshan Liangjie (洞山良价), a 9th-century Chinese Chan teacher
- Dongshan Shouchu (洞山守初), a 10th-century Chinese Chan teacher

== Other uses ==
- Dongshan River, a river in northeast Taiwan

== See also ==
- Shandong (disambiguation)
- Dong (disambiguation)
- Shan (disambiguation)
- Tung Shan (disambiguation)
