= Sasaki Tōichi =

Japanese soldier (1886–1955)

Lieutenant General Sasaki Tōichi
- 佐々木 到一
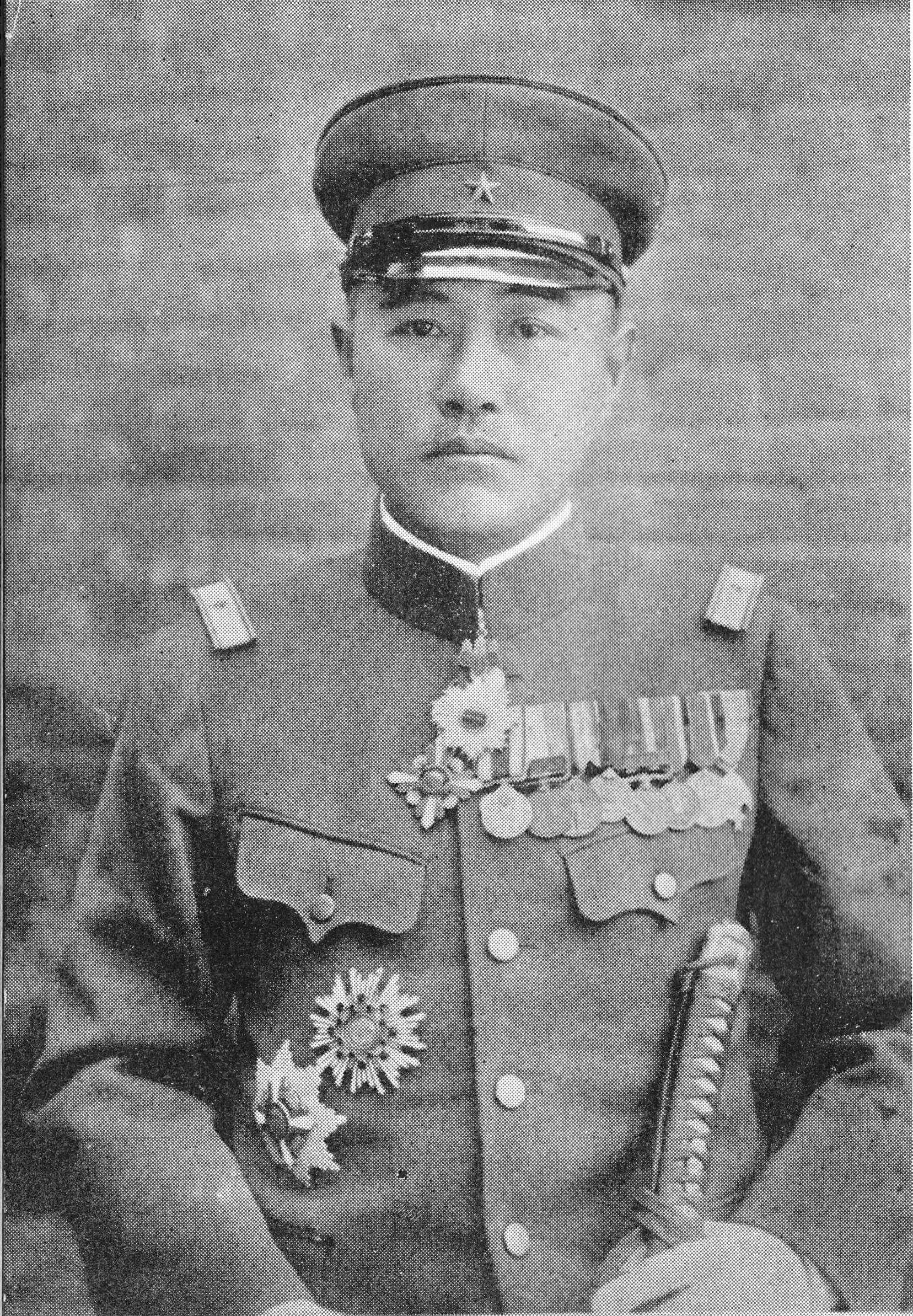
- Sasaki in 1935
- Born: 27 January 1886; Matsuyama, Ehime Prefecture; Empire of Japan
- Died: 30 May 1955 (aged 69); Fushun, Liaoning Province; People's Republic of China
- Military career
- Allegiance: Empire of Japan; Manchukuo
- Branch: Imperial Japanese Army
- Service years: 1902–1945

Lieutenant General Sasaki Tōichi (佐々木 到一; 27 January 1886 – 30 May 1955) was a Japanese soldier who served in the Imperial Japanese Army. He was known as an expert on Chinese affairs, had close relationships with leading figures in the Kuomintang (KMT)'s National Revolutionary Army during the 1920s, and expressed sympathy for their cause. A violent encounter with KMT forces during the 1928 Jinan incident, however, led him to abandon his pro-KMT stance, and adopt a pessimistic attitude toward China.

He later served as chief military advisor to the Japanese puppet state Manchukuo, and during the Second Sino-Japanese War, he was involved in perpetrating the Nanjing massacre. In the last days of the Second World War, Sasaki was captured by Soviet troops and handed over to the Chinese communists, who interned him at the Fushun War Criminals Management Centre, where he died in 1955. He was a prolific writer, and left detailed accounts of his experiences in China.

== Early life ==
Sasaki Tōichi was born in Matsuyama, Ehime Prefecture, Japan, on 27 January 1886, and was the eldest son of Major Sasaki Tōru (佐々木 透). His family later moved to Hiroshima, where he attended Seibi Primary School, which was affiliated with the Kaikosha, an organisation that provided a number of services to officers of the Imperial Japanese Army. He went on to attend Hiroshima Prefectural First Middle School, and then entered the Imperial Japanese Army Academy in 1902. He graduated in November 1905, and the following June, was commissioned as a second lieutenant in the 5th Division of the Imperial Japanese Army.

== Military career ==
=== Early career and travels across China (1911–1921) ===
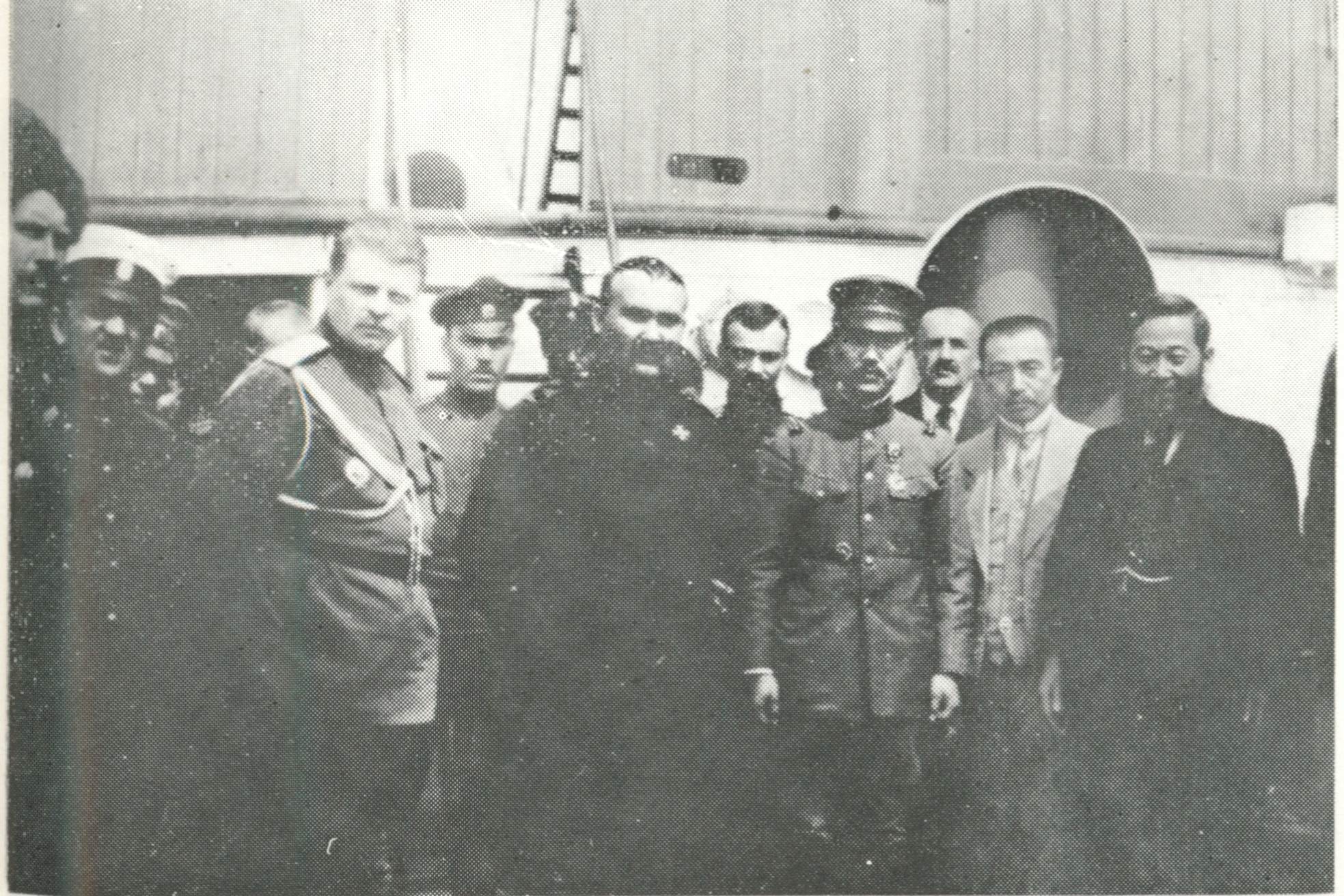
Grigory Mikhaylovich Semyonov (center) with Sasaki (right)

In March 1911, the 5th Division was deployed to Manchuria, and this was the first time Sasaki set foot in a foreign country. Sasaki failed to gain admission to the Army War College in December of that year, after the outbreak of the Xinhai Revolution that overthrew the Qing dynasty. He decided instead to remain in Manchuria to learn Mongolian and Chinese. Accordingly, he transferred to the Manchuria Independent Garrison Unit, which was charged with guarding the South Manchuria Railway. In February 1912, with a wave of anti-Manchu sentiment sweeping China, Sasaki's battalion was ordered to protect warehouses in Tieling. Sasaki wrote in his Autobiography of a Soldier that he received praise for his orchestration of negotiations with revolutionaries in the area, whereby he arranged for their transit through Tieling without conflict.

Following this incident, Sasaki's interest in China only continued to grow. Having received advice that he would need to graduate the Army War College if he wanted to become a China specialist for the military, Sasaki took the entrance test again in 1914, gaining admission. Upon entrance to the college, Sasaki's performance in subjects unrelated to Chinese studies, in which he had little interest, was so poor that he was in danger of dropping out. Despite this, he successfully completed his course and graduated from the college in November 1917.

In July 1918, he returned to China when he was assigned to the defence force of Japanese-occupied Qingdao in Shandong Province. While in Qingdao, Sasaki was given responsibility for topographical surveys of China. He researched Chinese maps, and went on expeditions to verify topographical features. He travelled to Nanjing and Hankou (part of what is now Wuhan), and planned to visit Henan Province, but contracted the Spanish flu mid-journey and was forced to call off the expedition to convalesce. The following year, he resumed his expeditions, travelling across China on foot to document its topographical features. During this time, he became deeply acquainted with the land, and with the lives of the everyday Chinese.

In September 1919, he was assigned to the Siberian Expeditionary Army, and served in the Japanese intervention in Siberia during the Russian Civil War, based in Manzhouli. Sasaki's role was to serve as a liaison officer between Japanese and Chinese forces under the Sino-Japanese Military Agreement of May 1918, and later, to help provide military assistance to White Russian Cossack leader Grigory Mikhaylovich Semyonov. After Japan cut off assistance to Semyonov in line with the Gongota Agreement of 1920, Sasaki's immediate superior ordered him to help Semyonov escape east to Primorskaya Oblast, contrary to the army's policy. Having completed this mission, the unknowing Sasaki reported to the Japanese command in Vladivostok, upon which he was reprimanded for aiding Semyonov, whose presence in the region could upset Japan's efforts to support the Far Eastern Republic neutral buffer state. Thereafter, Sasaki was effectively demoted, given a job with no duties in Vladivostok, and in June 1921, made to return to Japan to serve as a company leader (an inferior post that he had already served in after graduation from the Army War College). Sasaki wrote that this experience affected him greatly, and that he seriously considered quitting the military, but decided to remain following advice from his friend Sakai Takashi, who then worked in the China Department at the Imperial Japanese Army General Staff Office. In December 1921, he was appointed to work in the China Department, marking his return to active involvement in Chinese affairs.

=== As liaison to the Kuomintang (1922–1924) ===
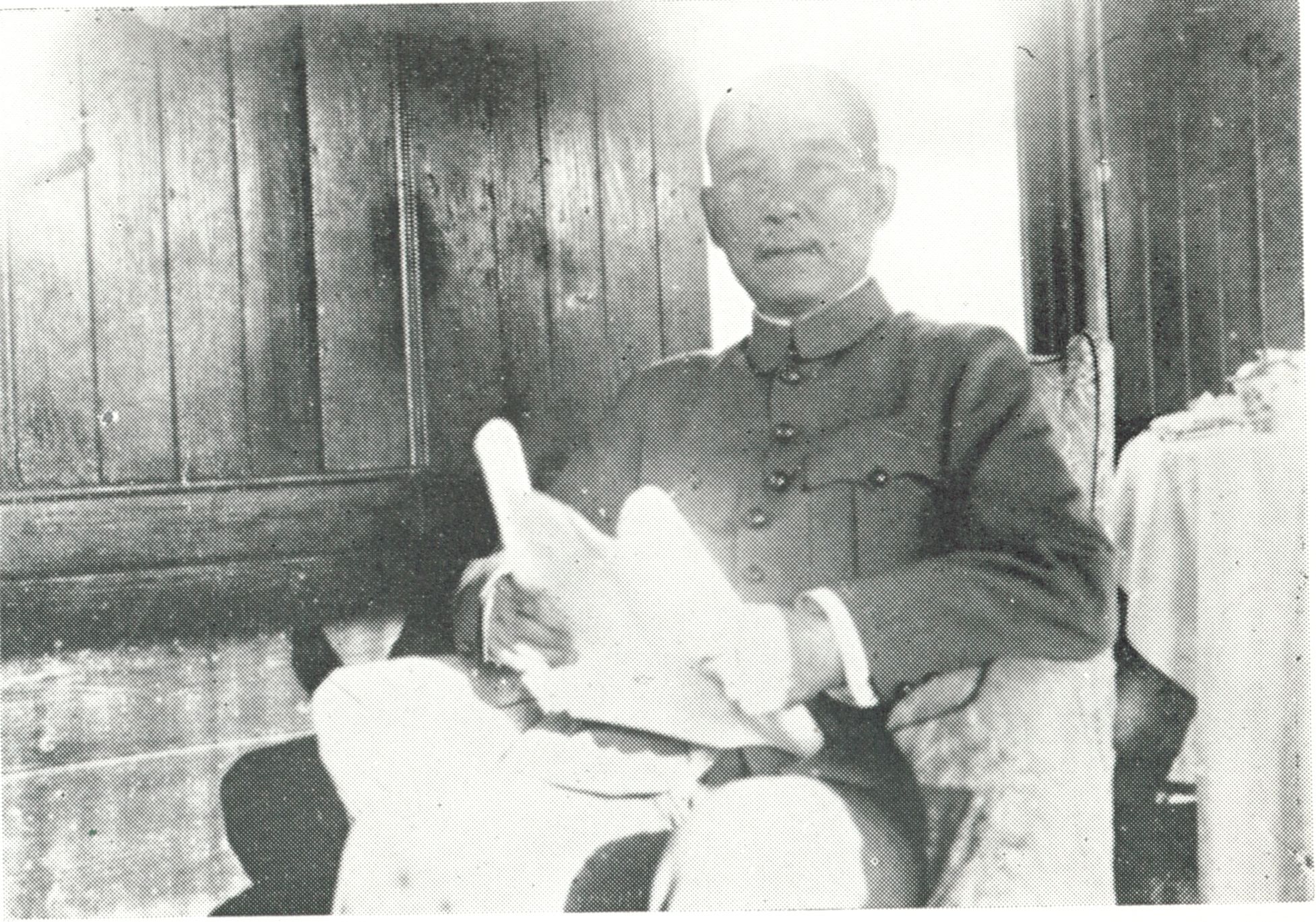
Sun Yat-sen, as photographed by Sasaki onboard Sun's armoured train

In August 1922, Sasaki, now holding the rank of major, was approached about his willingness to replace Isogai Rensuke as Japan's military attaché in Guangzhou, which was the base of Sun Yat-sen's Kuomintang (KMT) government. Sasaki eagerly accepted the post, generally considered undesirable as compared to posts in Beijing and Nanjing, which were then under the control of the internationally-recognised Beiyang government. He left Japan for Guangzhou in September 1922, travelling via Taipei and Hong Kong. At the time of Sasaki's arrival, Guangzhou was under the control of Chen Jiongming, who had launched a rebellion against the KMT. Sasaki's office in the Shamian Anglo-French concession area consisted of two rented rooms, and no other Japanese personnel were present. He first encountered Sun Yat-sen after Sun's return to Guangzhou in February 1923, following his forces' recapture of the city. Sasaki eagerly studied the KMT, and developed close relationships with important members of its leadership. He was unique in his interest in the KMT, which was not recognised by the Japanese government, and other Japanese diplomatic and military personnel were not keen on how closely he interacted with them. Sasaki admired Sun as an idealistic revolutionary, who did not fight for his own personal interest like the warlords of the Beiyang government, but in the interest of his country. In contrast, Sasaki viewed the warlord armies as an anti-societal "collection of beggars, thugs, gamblers, and thieves", and considered them the primary obstacle to China's reunification.

Sun Yat-sen would later request Sasaki's assistance in devising military strategies, and thus he became one of Sun's military advisors. Sasaki frequently travelled with Sun on his armoured train, and observed the KMT's operations. On one of these train trips, he was introduced to Chiang Kai-shek, though he did not think much of him at the time. In Sasaki's Autobiography of a Soldier, he claims that he proposed the design of what would later become known as the Zhongshan suit, though this cannot be corroborated. In June 1924, on invitation from Japanese-trained General Instructor He Yingqin, Sasaki visited the newly-opened Whampoa Military Academy, and was struck by its resemblance to his alma mater. Around this time, an anti-British strike had paralysed the Shamian concession where Sasaki lived, and he expressed his sympathy for the strikers, who he believed were on the path to restoring sovereignty to China. While Sasaki supported the reunification of China under KMT rule, he always believed that this would not include Manchuria, which, according to Sasaki, Sun Yat-sen indicated would be entrusted to Japan following the defeat of the warlords.

=== In Tokyo, Beijing and Nanjing (1924–1927) ===
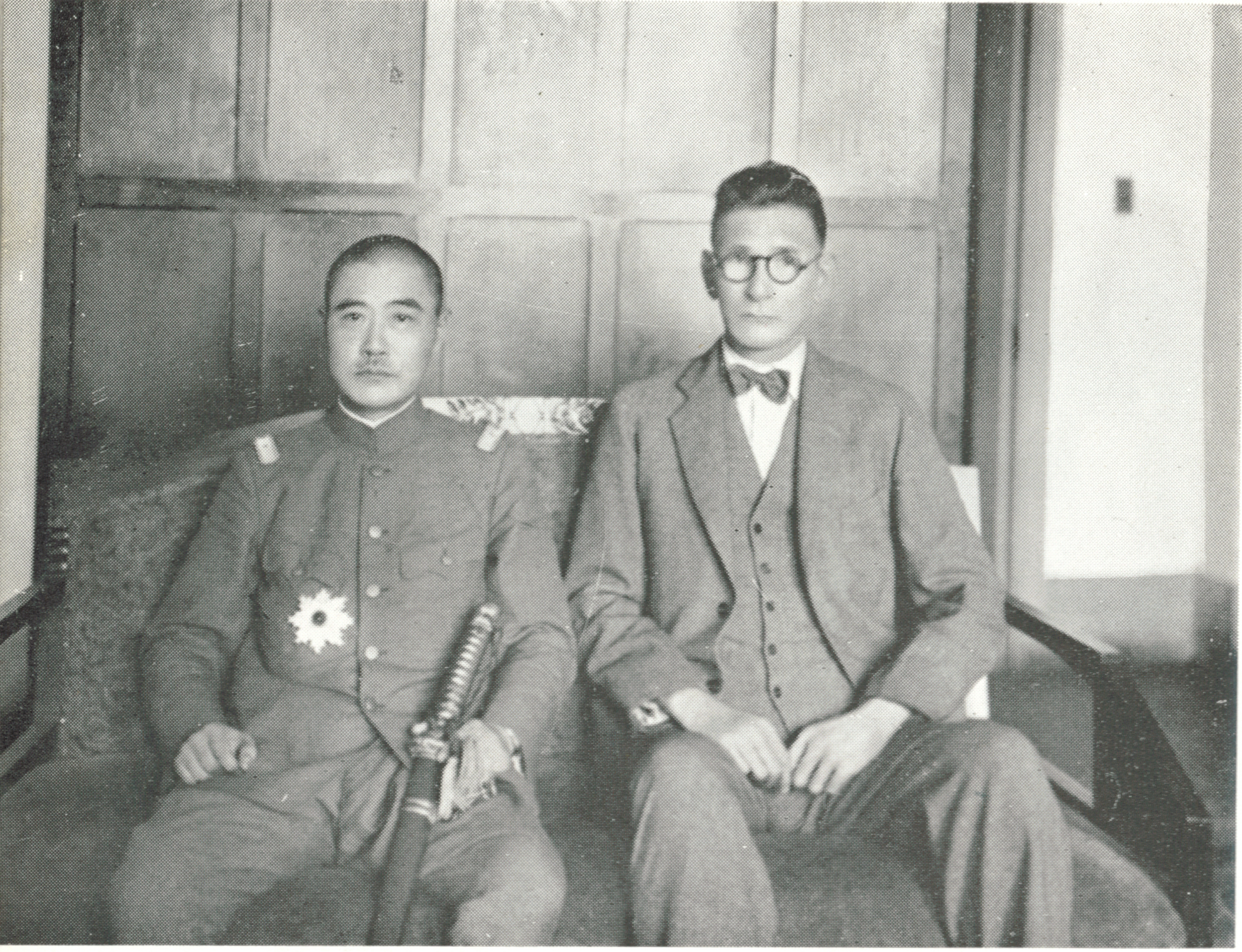
Sasaki with Ōkawa Shūmei

In August 1924, he returned to Japan to serve in the Imperial Japanese Army General Staff Office and as an instructor at the Army War College. Focusing on future of Sun and the KMT, Sasaki published papers suggesting that the KMT would go on to reunify China in a "fourth revolution". The Japanese military, however, was extremely sceptical of Sun, and Sasaki recalled being teased by Koiso Kuniaki: "Sasaki, where's that revolution of yours?" When Sasaki participated in a lecture held by Ōkawa Shūmei's Emperor Jimmu Society (a right-wing organisation), he referred to Sun with the honorific sensei, which Ōkawa criticised as being absurd, and a verbal argument ensued. Sasaki, who was a prolific writer, later became friends with Ōkawa, and his works were frequently published by Ōkawa's organisations. In November 1924, Sasaki was ordered to return to China to report on the proceedings of a conference between Sun, Beiyang leader Zhang Zuolin, and Duan Qirui in the aftermath of the Second Zhili–Fengtian War. He met Sun in Tianjin, where he found the KMT leader stricken with illness. Sun would go on to die in March of the next year, and Sasaki speculated that this would result in the KMT's unleashing of "a new level of destructiveness".

Continuing to make numerous trips to China, Sasaki was promoted to lieutenant colonel in 1926, and in September of that year, was assigned to the Japanese Legation in Beijing as aide to military attaché Honjō Shigeru. Sasaki, who still despised the warlords of the Beiyang government, did not get along with their Japanese military advisors, and actively avoided attending banquets held by Zhang Zuolin. Around this time, Chiang Kai-shek had taken up leadership of the National Revolutionary Army (NRA), begun the Northern Expedition to reunify China, and had attacked Hankou. In a paper published in April 1927, Sasaki wrote of his expectation that the KMT would successfully unite China. He stated that while the Northern Expedition would likely upset Japanese interests in the short term, these should be sacrificed for the sake of Japan's long term interest in the maintenance of peace and stability in East Asia, which would be facilitated by Chinese reunification. Most of his colleagues, however, remained pessimistic.

In March 1927, following the Nanjing incident, which included an attack on the Japanese consulate and the near assassination of the Japanese consul, Sasaki was posted to Nanjing, where it was hoped that his connections with KMT could be used to protect Japanese interests. The Japanese military and Sasaki laid the blame for that incident on radical communist fringes within the KMT, and began to search for a way to co-operate with Chiang Kai-shek, who would soon begin his own conflict with the KMT leftist government in Wuhan. Sasaki was concerned about the destructive force being unleashed by the revolutionary movement, and Iwane Matsui even suggested that he try to become Chiang's military advisor, but Sasaki replied that he would merely be used by Chiang, and declined. During this time, Sasaki would make continued trips between Shanghai, Nanjing, and Wuhan.

=== Jinan incident and aftermath (1928–1931) ===
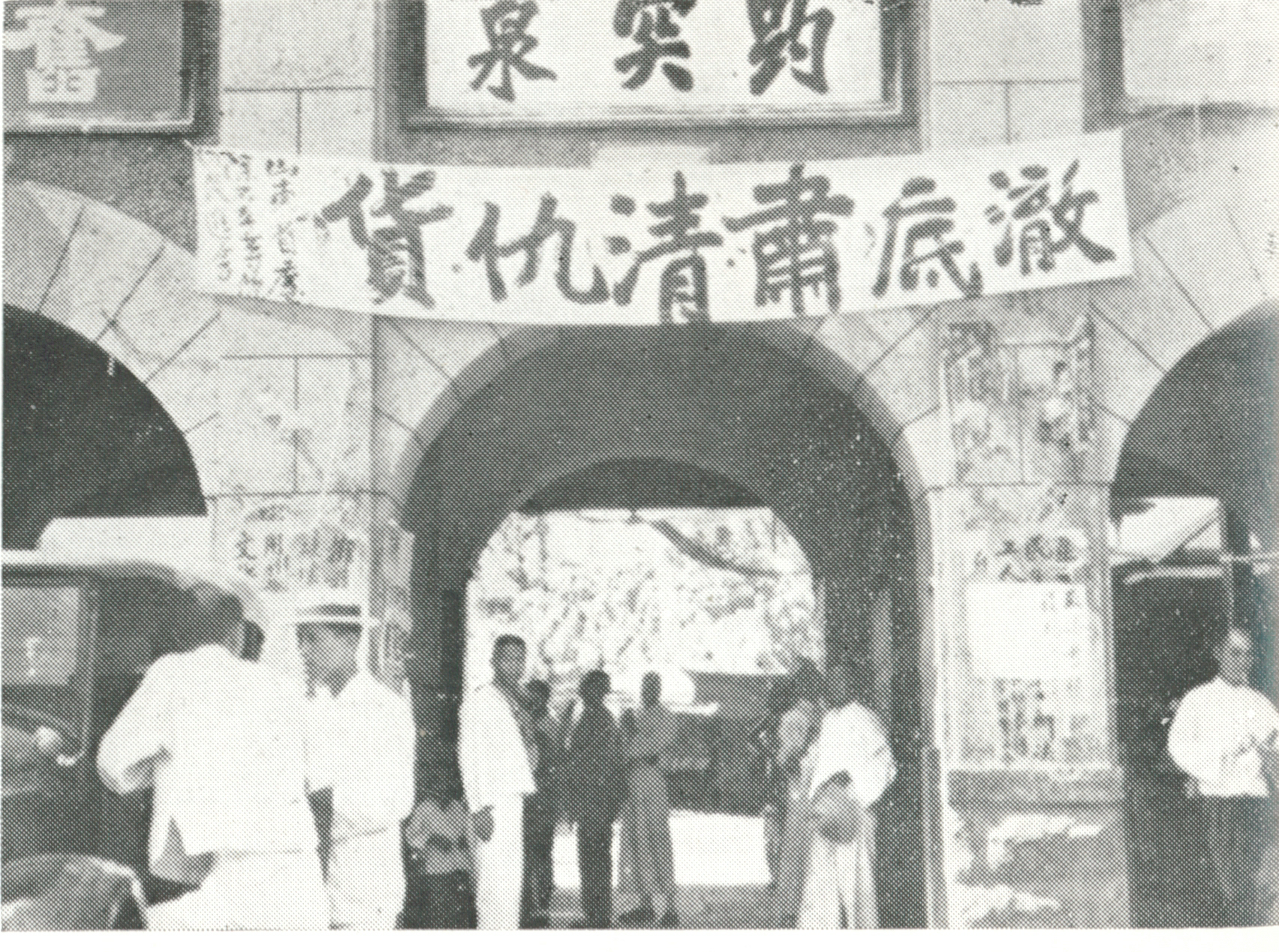
A banner hung on the entrance of Baotu Spring during the Jinan incident, as photographed by Sasaki. In Chinese, it reads "thoroughly clean up the enemy"

In January 1928, Chiang Kai-shek returned to the position of leader of the Northern Expedition, and restarted the NRA's advance north. Sasaki requested permission to embed with the NRA, and was granted permission to do so from April. The Japanese command was concerned that the advancing NRA, which was approaching the Japanese sphere of influence in Shandong Province, might come into conflict with Japanese forces in the region, and hoped that Sasaki could serve as a liaison between the two sides. During his time in the NRA, the Japanese Shandong Expeditions had heightened anti-Japanese sentiment among the Chinese, and in May, the two sides came into conflict in the Jinan incident.

Upon the NRA's arrival into Jinan, Sasaki met with the Japanese commander in the city, Major General Saitō Ryū, to convey a message from Chiang Kai-shek. The message requested the removal of security barricades established by the Japanese across the city. Saitō agreed to the request. On 3 May, however, a conflict broke out between Chinese and Japanese troops. Chiang then requested that Sasaki serve as an envoy to the Japanese military, whereby he was to request a truce. After he delivered this message, the Japanese side requested that he return to Chiang with a similar message. As Sasaki attempted to cross the NRA front line, however, he was stopped by Chinese troops, and dragged onto the ground. Sasaki's Chinese orderly made pleas in Cantonese to the effect that Sasaki was a guest of Chiang, and that he must not be killed, but none of the soldiers understood that language. Sasaki was badly beaten with a metal rod amid shouts of "Kill, kill, kill" and "down with Japanese imperialism!", and all of his belongings were stolen. Eventually, one of Chiang's officers arrived and saved Sasaki from the mob, but the damage had already been done. The Japanese response to Sasaki's beating was swift: Major General Tatekawa Yoshitsugu said it had become "necessary for Japan to chastise the lawless Chinese soldiers in order to maintain Japan's national and military prestige", and General Fukuda Hikosuke would soon launch an all-out assault on NRA positions in Jinan.

Sasaki was soon ordered to return to Japan to report on the Jinan incident. Sasaki's words were twisted by newspapers into expressing support for the KMT side, and he was treated as a coward and traitor upon his arrival back in Japan. As a result, he was ordered to take leave. While he was visiting the hot springs of the Izu Peninsula, Tashiro Kanichirō requested that he return to China, upon which he travelled to Nanjing in early June. However, from this point, the Chinese side refused all contact with Sasaki. When Chiang Kai-shek visited the badly injured Sasaki during the Jinan incident, he expressed distrust in the actions of the Japanese military, and said that his hopes for co-operation had evaporated. Sasaki, who felt betrayed by the KMT, wrote to his superiors that if the Chinese tried to evade responsibility for the Jinan incident, the Japanese would have no choice but to respond with force, now favouring a hard-line approach. Despite this, he was removed from the negotiations. In this way, Sasaki found himself being treated by the Japanese as if he were a KMT spy, and by the Chinese as if he were a spy of the Japanese military. This experience led him to abandon his dream of a modern China led by the KMT, and shift toward a hard-line view on China rooted in pessimism, similar to that of his colleagues.

Sasaki claimed that, following the Jinan incident, he gave Kōmoto Daisaku the idea for Zhang Zuolin's assassination in the Huanggutun incident, proposing that the death of Zhang would sweep up Manchuria in a revolution that would arouse Japanese public interest in the region, and provide a pretext for an invasion. There is nothing to corroborate this claim, however. In April 1929, Sasaki was assigned to the 46th Infantry Regiment, and in August 1930, he was elevated to the rank of colonel. While serving as commander of the Toyohashi-based 18th Infantry Regiment in 1931, he took part in the October incident coup attempt as an intermediary to coup supporters across Japan. The attempt failed, and though Sasaki was questioned by the Kenpeitai (military police), he was not punished.

=== In Manchuria (1932–1937) ===
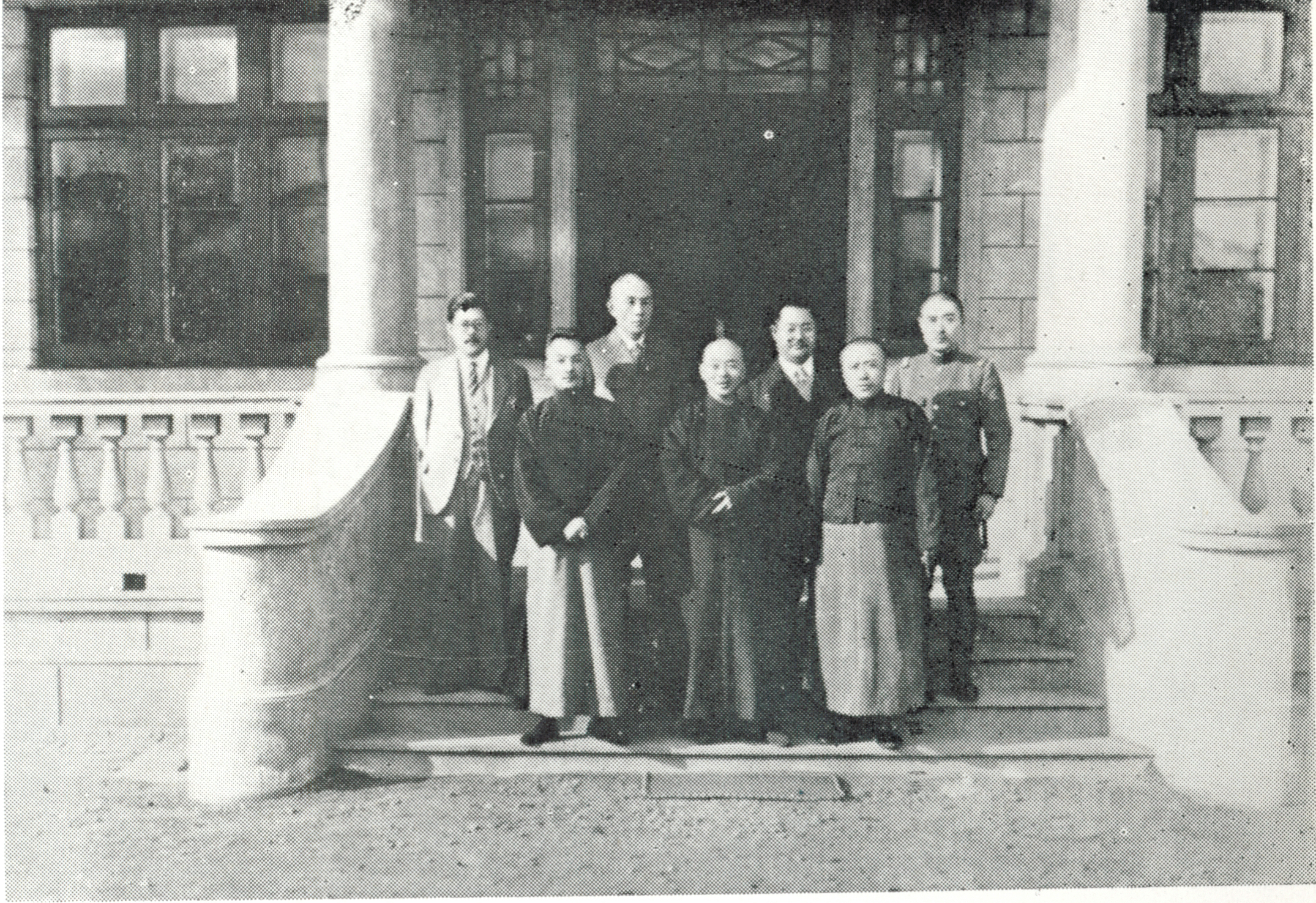
Meeting of Manchukuo military leaders at Xi Qia's residence in February 1933. From the right, Sasaki, Xi, Ōsako Michisada, Xie Jieshi, Tada Hayao, Zhang Yanqing, Sun Fuchen

When the January 28 incident broke out in January 1932, Sasaki was to be deployed to Shanghai as part of Shirakawa Yoshinori's army staff, but a truce was reached before his unit was brought into action. In the same year, he was appointed chief of staff of the 9th Division, before being elevated to the post of Kwantung Army-affiliated military advisor to the new puppet state of Manchukuo, where he was to aid in the establishment of the Manchukuo Army. From December 1934, Sasaki served as chief military advisor to Manchukuo, and received a promotion to major general in March 1935. Sasaki devoted himself to the cultivation of the Manchukuo military, which he viewed as an opportunity to demonstrate the fruits of his long observation of Chinese military forces. He was credited with converting the Manchukuo military from a mere domestic peacekeeping force into a true regular army. During this time, Sasaki also cultivated a plan to use four cadets who had participated in the 15 May incident coup attempt as agents to promote resistance against European colonial rule in Southeast Asia, though this never came to fruition.

By 1934, Sasaki had become convinced that, contrary to his earlier convictions, conflict between Japan and China was inevitable. In such a circumstance, Sasaki believed, Japan could not risk losing access to Manchuria's natural resources, and therefore was justified in its intervention in the region. He wrote that he viewed the Mukden incident as a "revolution" that had liberated the people of Manchuria from "feudal" warlord rule, and an attempt to establish a modern "moral state" rooted in multi-ethnic harmony. Upon arrival in Manchuria, however, Sasaki was disappointed. He noted that the Japanese administrators of the state behaved no differently from those in the colonies of Taiwan and Korea, and during his time as military advisor, repeatedly advised that Japanese officers should dispose of their "feelings of superiority" to the Chinese. Sasaki went on to write that, five years after its establishment, in 1937, Manchukuo was not an "independent state", and that the continued references to it as such were nothing more than "self-deception". He also noted that the Manchukuo army was not held together by any noble national ethos (such as the aforementioned "multi-ethnic harmony"), but instead by a comprehensive system of punishment and reward. The disaffected Sasaki left Manchuria a few months later in August 1937, when he was unexpectedly made commander of the 30th Brigade of the 16th Division.

=== Second Sino-Japanese War (1937–1941) ===
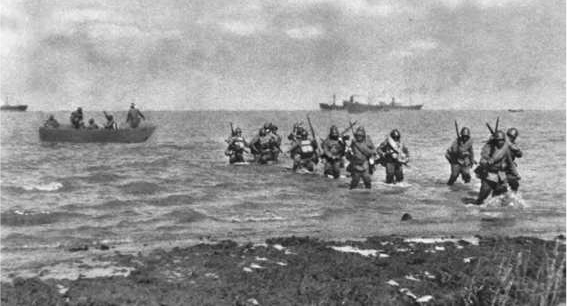
The 16th Division's landing at Baimaokou, on the Yangtze

Sasaki's 30th Brigade was deployed to participate in the Second Sino-Japanese War in November 1937. As the brigade was loaded onto ships at Dairen in the Kwantung Leased Territory, even Sasaki was not informed of their intended destination. Only once onboard was he allowed to open a sealed packet of documents revealing that he would be headed to the Shanghai area. His brigade landed north of Shanghai at Baimaokou during the night/morning of 13–14 November, initially with the objective of encircling Chinese troops in Shanghai during the ongoing battle there. Their mission was quickly shifted, however, into a march westward on the Chinese capital, Nanjing. Having approached Nanjing via the northern foot of the Purple Mountain, Sasaki arrived in the city on 13 December, and began an assault on its northern gate as part of the Battle of Nanjing. In a diary entry written that day, Sasaki described his unit's participation in the slaughter of prisoners of war and civilians during the Nanjing massacre:

The number of abandoned enemy bodies in our area today was ten thousand plus thousands more. If we include those [Chinese] whose escape rafts or boats on the Yangtze were sunk by fire from our armoured cars, plus POWs killed by our units, our detachment alone must have taken care of over 20,000. We finished the mop-up and secured our rear at about 2:00 pm. While regrouping, we advanced to Heping Gate. Later, the enemy surrendered in the thousands. Frenzied troops-- rebuffing efforts by superiors to restrain them-- finished off these POWs one after another. Even if they aren't soldiers [e.g., medics or priests], men would yell, "Kill the whole damn lot!" after recalling the past ten days of bloody fighting in which so many buddies had shed so much blood.

The following day, Sasaki wrote that he was in "complete control" of two regiments in charge of "mopping up" in the city, and that his troops "relentlessly killed at once" any remnants of the defeated Chinese troops that "resisted or refused to comply". He noted that the moat of the Taiping Gate was "filled with dead bodies", and that the commercial district of Xiaguan had been "burned to ashes". On 26 December, Sasaki indicated that he was appointed chairman of the "Pacification Committee", and charged with eliminating Chinese troops in Nanjing that had hidden among ordinary citizens. Observing the destruction his forces had wrought upon the city he once lived in, Sasaki wrote:

民国十六年二月、国民革命軍が南京に入城して以来まさに十年、当時城内の人口三十万から八十万に増加し、農民を搾取してここに見てくれがしの近代都市を建設することに成功した。
だが、今や槿花一朝の夢と化したこの破壊された首都の惨状をみて誰か感慨なからんやだ。

Exactly ten years after the National Revolutionary Army entered Nanjing in February of the 16th year of the Republic, the city's population had increased from 300,000 to 800,000. Through the exploitation of the peasantry, the Nationalists succeeded in building a modern city that seemed as if to cry out: "Look at me!" However, as one looks upon the sorry state of this destroyed capital, now merely a fading dream of prosperity, there is not a soul who could help but feel deeply emotional.

In March 1938, he was elevated to lieutenant general, and served as the commander of the 3rd Independent Mixed Brigade. In August of that year, Sasaki was appointed to the newly-created post of commander of the Kenpeitai in China (Japanese: 支那駐屯憲兵隊司令官), which was under the North China Area Army's jurisdiction. Sasaki, who was known for his success in endeavouring to pacify (Japanese: 治安粛正, chian shukusei) Manchukuo, performed a similar role in North China. Then, in September 1939, he was made commander of the 10th Division based in Himeji. Just before the breakout of the Pacific War, he retired and was designated as a member of the reserve. Following his retirement, he settled in the Hoshi-ga-Ura area of Dairen, and served on the board of directors of the Concordia Association.

== Later life and death ==
Near the end of the Second World War in July 1945, Sasaki was recalled to active duty, and was appointed commander of the newly-formed 149th Division, based in Manchuria. The division never saw combat during the Soviet invasion of the region and was disarmed on 23 August, after which Sasaki was taken prisoner by the Soviet Army. He was then handed over to the Chinese communist authorities, who interned him at the Fushun War Criminals Management Centre in Liaoning Province. He died there of a cerebral haemorrhage on 30 May 1955.

== Works ==
Works written by Sasaki include:

- Shokō no shina [China's Dawn], 1926
- Shina rikugun kaizōron [Essay on the Reform of the Chinese Army], 1927
- Nanpō kakumei seiryoku no jissō to sono hihan [Critique of the Reality of the Southern Revolutionary Forces], 1927
- Bukan ka Nankin ka [Wuhan or Nanjing], 1927
- Shina-nai sōsen jūgun-ki [My Experience of the Strife in China], 1931
- Watashi wa shina o kaku miru [I View China Thus], 1942
- Aru gunjin no jiden [Autobiography of a Soldier], 1963
