= Shantung (disambiguation) =

Shantung is the Wade-Giles romanization of Shandong, a province and peninsula in China.

Shantung and its variants (Shan-tung, Shan Tung, Shan-Tung) may also refer to:

== Places ==
- Shantung Street, Mong Kok, Kowloon, Hong Kong
- Shantung Christian University, an alternate name of Cheeloo University
- The Apostolic Vicariate of Shantung, an office under the Roman Catholic Archdiocese of Jinan
- The Diocese of Shantung, a former missionary diocese of the Anglican Church in China

=== Facilities and structures ===
- The Shantung Railway, the former name of the Qingdao–Jinan railway in Shandong
- Shantung Road Hospital, the former name of Renji Hospital, Shanghai Jiao Tong University School of Medicine in Pudong, Shanghai

== People ==
- Yau Shan-Tung, an actor in the traveling production of Flower Drum Song

=== Fictional characters ===
- Shan Tung, a character from the 1920 silent U.S. western film The River's End (film)
- Shantung Cat, a character from the 1994 Hong Kong film Tian Di
- Han Shan-tung, a character from The Gatekeepers (a.k.a. The Power of Five) by Anthony Horowitz; see List of The Power of Five characters
- Sorcerer-Prince Shan-Tung, a character from the French fantasy comic La Quête de l'oiseau du temps
- Shan-Tung, a character from the Agatha Christie Hercule Poirot story The Labours of Hercules

== Military ==
- The Battle of Shantung (1904), another name for the Battle of the Yellow Sea during the Russo-Japanese War
- Shantung Treaty (1922), Washington Naval Conference (WNC); a treaty associated with the Nine-Power Treaty
- Shantung Incident (1927), another name for the Jinan Incident between Nationalist Chinese and the Japanese
- Shantung Column, predecessor of the 73rd Group Army

== Other uses ==
- Shantung (fabric), a type of silk fabric from Shandong
- Shantung, a French racehorse, the sire of Full Dress, the damsire of Karasi and Erins Isle (horse)
- SS Shantung, a Swedish cargo ship; see List of shipwrecks in December 1941

== See also ==
- Tung Shan (disambiguation)
- Tung (disambiguation)
- Shan (disambiguation)
- Shandong (disambiguation)
