= Timeline of Chiang Kai-shek =

This is a timeline of Chiang Kai-shek's (Jiang Jieshi) life.

== 1880s ==
Year	Date	Event
1887	31 October	Jiang is born to Jiang Suan and Wang Caiyu in Xikou
1889		Jiang's family moves to a two-story merchant's house a hundred feet or so down Wu Ling Street

== 1890s ==
Year	Date	Event
1896		Jiang's father Jiang Suan dies and he inherits the house, bamboo grove, and rice paddies

== 1900s ==
Year	Date	Event
1901	winter	Jiang marries village wife, Mao Fumei
1903		Jiang takes new civil service examination, fails, enters the Phoenix Mountain Academy, a small Confucian school in Fenghua
1903	February	Jiang transfers to the Golden Arrow Academy in Ningbo
1906	February	Jiang transfers to the Dragon River School in Fenghua
1906		Jiang cuts off his Queue
1906		Jiang spends several months in Tokyo learning Japanese
1906		Jiang enters the Baoding Military Academy
1907		Jiang enters the Tokyo Shinbu Gakko, a school set up for Chinese students wishing to attend a Japanese military academy
1909	November	Jiang graduates from the Tokyo Shinbu Gakko and enters the 19th Field Artillery Regiment at Takada

== 1910s ==
Year	Date	Event
1910	27 April	Mao Fumei delivers Jiang Jingguo
1911	10 October	Wuchang Uprising: The New Army rebels in Wuchang and Jiang leaves for Shanghai
1911		Jiang is put in charge of a "dare to die" contingent made up of Fenghua fishermen reinforced by Green Gang and Red Gang members
1911	4 November	Jiang's men take part in the New Army's seizure of key public buildings in Hangzhou
1912	6 January	Sun Zhongshan is inaugurated as provisional President of China by the National Assembly in Nanjing
1912	12 January	Jiang may or may not have assassinated Tao Chengzhang, head of the Guangfuhui, and rival of Chen Qimei for the governorship of Zhejiang
1912	12 March	Sun Zhongshan resigns and Yuan Shikai becomes president, however he only controls half of the old Manchu Army
1912	25 August	The Tongmenghui and four other parties form the Nationalist Party, also known as the Kuomintang (KMT), with Song Jiaoren as its leader
1913	March	The KMT wins control of the National Assembly
1913	22 March	Song Jiaoren is assassinated
1913	August	Jiang and Chen Qimei flee to Japan and Sun Zhongshan goes to Yokohama
1913	December	Jiang meets Sun Zhongshan for the first time
1914	spring	Sun Zhongshan sends Jiang to Shanghai to pull together the revolutionary underground but he fails and returns to Japan
1914		Sun Zhongshan sends Jiang to recruit warlords in Manchuria but he fails and returns to Japan
1915	18 January	The Twenty-One Demands are handed to Yuan Shikai and a revised "Thirteen Demands" are eventually agreed upon
1915		Jiang and Chen Qimei return to Shanghai
1915	10 November	The defense commissioner in Chinese Shanghai, Zheng Ruzheng, is assassinated on the orders of Jiang and Chen
1915		An attack on the police headquarters by Jiang's "dare to die" teams fails and he falls ill
1916	February	Jiang and Chen Qimei try to rebuild the Chinese Revolutionary Army in Shanghai
1916	18 May	Chen Qimei is assassinated
1916	6 June	Yuan Shikai dies and Sun Zhongshan returns to Shanghai
1918		The KMT flees to Guangzhou and launches the Constitutional Protection Movement with the support of Chen Jiongming and warlords in Guangdong and Yunnan
1918	March	Jiang joins Chen Jiongming's army as senior operations officer for an attack on the warlord of Fujian
1918		Sun Zhongshan goes into exile in Shanghai due to warlord demand for more authority
1918	July	Jiang takes a key town in Fujian
1919	May	Jiang returns to Shanghai
1919	4 May	May Fourth Movement: Mass demonstrations spread all over China in response to the Treaty of Versailles
1919		Jiang adopts Jiang Weiguo, son of Dai Jitao
1919		Moscow announces that it will relinquish special rights in Manchuria and cancel all the "unequal" tsarist treaties with China

== 1920s ==
Year	Date	Event
1920	spring	Jiang contracts typhoid
1920	30 September	Sun Zhongshan appoints Jiang as chief of staff of the Second Guangdong Army
1920	October	Guangdong–Guangxi War: Chen Jiongming and the Second Guangdong Army enter Guangzhou
1920	12 November	Jiang returns to Shanghai to brief Sun Zhongshan and then leaves for Zhejiang
1921	April	Guangdong–Guangxi War: A Beiyang government backed Old Guangxi Clique army attacks Guangdong but is defeated by Xu Chongzhi and the KMT occupy Guangxi
1921	4 May	Sun Zhongshan becomes president again
1921	10 May	Jiang arrives in Guangzhou
1921	4 June	Jiang's mother dies
1922		Chen Jiongming attacks the KMT and Sun Zhongshan escapes to Pazhou
1922	29 June	Jiang joins Sun Zhongshan at Pazhou
1922	9 August	Jiang and Sun leave for Xianggang and Shanghai
1923		Sun Zhongshan returns to Guangzhou and appoints Jiang as Xu Chongzhi's chief of staff
1923	August	Jiang leaves for the Soviet Union
1923	15 December	Jiang returns to Shanghai
1924	12 January	Jiang returns to Guangzhou
1924	June	Sun Zhongshan and Jiang preside over the opening of the Huangpu Military Academy
1925	12 March	Sun Zhongshan dies
1925	30 May	May Thirtieth Movement: The Shanghai Municipal Police fire on striking workers, causing widespread anti-foreign demonstrations and riots
1925	23 June	Canton–Hong Kong strike: Huangpu Military Academy cadets are among those killed by British troops firing on anti-imperialist protesters
1925	1 July	The Nationalist government is formed in Guangzhou with Wang Jingwei as chairman of the new ruling political council
1925		The National Revolutionary Army is formed
1925	20 August	Liao Zhongkai is assassinated and Jiang enters the KMT's top triumvirate consisting of himself, Wang Jingwei, and Xu Chongzhi
1925	20 September	Xu Chongzhi is forced to leave for Shanghai due to charges of corruption
1925	October	Jiang Jingguo is approved for study at the University of the Toilers of the East in Moscow
1925	October	Chen Jiongming is defeated
1925	November	Disaffected KMT veterans including Dai Jitao vote to expel the communists from the party
1926	January	Jiang is voted onto the Central Executive Committee
1926	18 March	Jiang is alerted to a plot by the Chinese Communist Party Central Executive Committee and the Russians to oust him
1926	20 March	Canton Coup: Jiang places Guangzhou under martial law and arrests 50 communists
1926		Wang Jingwei is ousted and leaves for France
1926	June	Tang Shengzhi defects to the KMT
1926	9 July	Jiang becomes Supreme Commander
1926	11 July	Northern Expedition: The NRA takes Changsha
1926	October	Northern Expedition: The NRA defeats warlord forces in Hubei and occupy Wuhan
1926	18 December	Northern Expedition: He Yingqin's First Corps capture Fujian and move into Zhejiang
1926		Northern Expedition: Jiang gains control of China from Guangxi in the south, to Sichuan in the west, to the Changjiang at Wuhan in the north, and northern Fujian in the east
1927	1 March	The Wuhan Central Executive Committee places Jiang under a new military council and issues a secret order for his arrest
1927	22 March	Northern Expedition: Bai Chongxi's forces enter Shanghai
1927	23 March	Northern Expedition: Zheng Qian's forces enter Nanjing
1927	24 March	Northern Expedition: Jiang reaches Nanjing
1927	26 March	Jiang returns to Shanghai
1927	6 April	Wang Jingwei arrives in Shanghai and refuses leadership of the KMT, leaving for Wuhan
1927	6 April	Jiang institutes martial law and leaves for Nanjing
1927	6 April	Joseph Stalin declares that KMT is of no more use and that Jiang should be eliminated
1927	12 April	Shanghai massacre: Communists are killed or arrested in Shanghai, Guangzhou, Guilin, Ningbo, and Xiamen
1927	19 June	Feng Yuxiang joins the KMT
1927	24 July	Northern Expedition: Sun Chuanfang defeats NRA forces and takes Xuzhou
1927	12 August	Jiang resigns and leaves for Shanghai
1927	16 August	NRA forces retake Xuzhou and Sun Chuanfang flees across the Yellow River
1927	1 December	Jiang marries Song Meiling in Shanghai
1928		Jiang returns to power and Wang Jingwei resigns, leaving for France
1928	2 May	Jinan incident: The Japanese army bomb Jinan, killing hundreds
1928	5 May	Jinan incident: The Japanese arrest Nanjing's representative Cai Gongshi, cut out his tongue, gouge out his eyes, and then shoot him as well as ten of his staff members
1928	11 May	Jinan incident: The Japanese army attacks the NRA, killing 11,000 soldiers and civilians in Jinan
1928	4 June	Huanggutun incident: Zhang Zuolin's train is bombed and he dies a few days later
1928	19 June	Northern Expedition: Zhang Zuolin's son, Zhang Xueliang, cables Jiang expressing his loyalty to the Chinese nation
1928	10 October	Jiang becomes the director of the State Council, in effect the president
1928	29 December	Chinese reunification (1928): Zhang Xueliang replaces the flags of the Beiyang government with the flag of the Republic of China
1929	28 March	Jinan incident: The Japanese army withdraws from Shandong
1929	April	Sino-Soviet conflict (1929): Zhang Xueliang seizes the Soviet consulate in Harbin
1929	July	Sino-Soviet conflict (1929): Zhang Xueliang seizes the Chinese Eastern Railway
1929	12 October	Sino-Soviet conflict (1929): Soviet troops defeat Zhang Xueliang's forces
1929	December	Sino-Soviet conflict (1929): Soviet rights to the Chinese Eastern Railway is restored

== 1930s ==
Year	Date	Event
1930	June	Central Plains War: Li Zongren, Bai Chongxi, Feng Yuxiang, Zhang Fakui, and Yan Xishan form an anti-Jiang coalition
1930	autumn	Encirclement Campaigns: NRA troops fail to defeat communist forces in the Jinggang Mountains
1930	November	Central Plains War: The anti-Jiang coalition is defeated
1931	April	Encirclement Campaigns: He Yingqin's forces fail to suppress communist forces in Jiangxi
1931		Wang Jingwei sets up an anti-Jiang government in Guangzhou
1931	1 July	Encirclement Campaigns: The NRA defeat the Chinese Red Army
1931	18 September	Mukden Incident: The Kwantung Army sets off an explosion on a rail line outside Shenyang and fires artillery into a nearby Chinese garrison before occupying the city
1931		Japanese invasion of Manchuria: Japan invades Manchuria
1931	15 December	Jiang resigns
1932	January	Jiang meets with Wang Jingwei and returns as the KMT's military leader while Wang becomes head of government
1932	28 January	January 28 Incident: Japan invades Shanghai and forces Chinese troops to withdraw
1932	March	Jiang resumes his position as chairman of the Military Council and chief of the General Staff
1932	April	Encirclement Campaigns: NRA troops force Zhang Guotao to flee to Sichuan
1933	1 January	Defense of the Great Wall: Japan occupies Shanhai Pass
1933	1 March	Battle of Rehe: Japan takes Rehe
1933	May	Encirclement Campaigns: NRA forces start blockading communist areas
1933	31 May	Tanggu Truce: The Republic of China agrees to a local armistice declaring the northern part of Hebei a demilitarized zone, essentially ceding it to Japan
1934	16 October	Long March: The Chinese Red Army escapes from Jiangxi
1935	January	Long March: The Chinese Red Army reaches Zunyi and joines Zhang Guotao's army; Mao Zedong is elected the CCP's senior military as well as political authority
1935	September	Jiang announces that China will never surrender its sovereignty or Manchuria
1935	October	Long March: The Chinese Red Army arrive at Baoan
1935	November	Wang Jingwei is wounded in an assassination attempt and Jiang takes over as president of the Executive Yuan
1935		NRA forces retreat from Chahar
1936	February	Zhang Xueliang meets with CCP representatives in Xi'an to discuss the formation of an anti-Japan anti-Jiang government
1936	6 April	Zhang Xueliang meets with Zhou Enlai
1936	May	Zhou Enlai meets with ROC representatives to discuss a united front
1936	31 October	Jiang celebrates his birthday in Luoyang
1936	12 December	Xi'an Incident: Zhang Xueliang kidnaps Jiang
1936	26 December	Xi'an Incident: Jiang offers some verbal concessions and is released
1937	19 April	Jiang Jingguo arrives in Shanghai
1937	7 July	Marco Polo Bridge Incident: Japanese troops performing maneuvers around Beijing receive fire from the NRA and de-escalation fails, ending in Japanese shelling of Chinese troops
1937	12 July	Battle of Beiping–Tianjin: Japanese troops arrive in Tianjin
1937	22 July	Battle of Beiping–Tianjin: The Japanese order Chinese forces to withdraw from the area, but they attack instead
1937	7 August	Jiang convenes the Military Council and declares all-out resistance as the national policy
1937	13 August	Battle of Shanghai: The NRA attempts to drive Japanese forces from Shanghai but fail
1937	5 November	Battle of Shanghai: Japanese forces land on the beaches of Hangzhou Bay and advance toward Suzhou River
1937	8 November	Battle of Shanghai: Jiang gives the orders to withdraw
1937	7 December	Battle of Nanjing: Jiang and Song Meiling leave Nanjing for Lushan
1937	12 December	Battle of Nanjing: Tang Shengzhi gives the order to break out of Japanese encirclement
1938	24 March	Battle of Taierzhuang: Japanese forces fall into an ambush at a railway spur line at Taierzhuang
1938	5 June	1938 Yellow River flood: Soldiers blow open the dikes on the south banks of the Yellow River, flooding Henan, Anhui, and Jiangsu
1938	24 October	Battle of Wuhan: Jiang gives the order to withdraw from Wuhan
1938	November	Jiang arrives in Chongqing
1938		The Burma Road is constructed by 200,000 laborers and engineers
1939	27 September	Battle of Changsha (1939): A Japanese attack on Changsha is defeated and withdraws with heavy casualties
1939	winter	1939–40 Winter Offensive: NRA forces attack Japanese positions but ultimately end in operational failure

== 1940s ==
Year	Date	Event
1940	January	Wang Jingwei defects to the Japanese and sets up the Reorganized National Government of the Republic of China in Nanjing
1940	August	Hundred Regiments Offensive: The Eighth Route Army attacks Japanese occupied areas in Shanxi and Hebei
1940	December	Hundred Regiments Offensive: The communist offensive is reversed and Japanese retaliation reduces the population of communist base areas by 19 million
1941	7 January	New Fourth Army incident: The New Fourth Army moves south into ROC territory and clash with NRA forces
1941	30 January	Battle of South Henan: NRA and Japanese forces clash in South Henan
1941	8 December	Attack on Pearl Harbor: Jiang receives news of Japan's attack on Pearl Harbor
1941	24 December	Battle of Changsha (1942): Japanese forces attack Changsha
1942	15 January	Battle of Changsha (1942): Japanese forces withdraw from Changsha and suffer heavy losses from a Chinese encirclement maneuver
1942	18 February	Jiang meets Gandhi outside Kolkata
1942	27 February	Jiang visits Lashio
1942	19 March	Battle of Toungoo: Japanese forces attack NRA troops at Toungoo
1942	30 March	Battle of Toungoo: NRA troops withdraw
1942	18 April	Doolittle Raid: American bombers crash land in China
1942	19 April	Battle of Yenangyaung: NRA forces assist British troops from escaping a Japanese encirclement
1942	20 April	Battle of Yenangyaung: Japanese forces destroy the Sixth Army's Temporary 55th Division
1942	29 April	The Japanese seize Lashio
1942	April	Battle of West Hubei: Japanese forces enter Hubei and Hunan to loot and collect supplies
1942	5 May	Joseph Stilwell leaves his soldiers and walks out to India
1942	15 May	Zhejiang-Jiangxi campaign: Japanese forces devastate Zhejiang and Jiangxi in reprisal for the Doolittle Raid, killing hundreds of thousands
1942	2 June	Joseph Stilwell flies back to Chongqing
1942	10 October	Jiang announces that Washington and London have agreed to drop "extraterritoriality"
1943	2 November	Battle of Changde: Japanese forces capture Changde
1943	21 November	Cairo Conference: Jiang and Mme. Chiang arrive in Cairo
1943	1 December	The Cairo Declaration promises to return all territories Japan had stolen from China
1943	7 December	Roosevelt and Churchill inform Chiang from Tehran Conference that promised aid would not be available
1943	20 December	Battle of Changde: Japanese forces are forced to withdraw from Changde
1944	19 April	Operation Ichigo: Japanese forces begin their largest land operation and cross the Yellow River into Henan
1944	25 May	Battle of Central Henan: Jiang gives the orders to withdraw
1944	26 June	Battle of Changsha (1944): Zhang Deneng gives the orders to abandon Changsha
1944	22 June	Defense of Hengyang: Japanese forces lay siege to Hengyang
1944	3 August	Siege of Myitkyina: Allied forces take Myitkyina
1944	8 August	Defense of Hengyang: Japanese forces take Hengyang
1944	24 November	Battle of Guilin–Liuzhou: Japanese forces take Guilin and Liuzhou
1945	9 April	Battle of West Hunan: Japanese forces advance into western Hunan
1945	7 June	Battle of West Hunan: Japanese forces are routed
1945	15 August	Victory over Japan Day: Jiang receives news of Japan's surrender and he broadcasts a victory speech throughout all of China
1945	29 August	Chongqing Negotiations: Mao and Jiang start negotiations
1945	16 December	Jiang visits Beijing
1946	13 January	Jiang and Mao agree to cease-fire following the convening of the Political Consultative Assembly

== 1970s ==
Year	Date	Event
1975	5 April	Jiang dies

== See also ==
- History of China–United States relations to 1948
