= Empress Dong =

Empress Dong may refer to:

- Empress Dowager Dong (died 189), empress dowager during the Han dynasty
- Empress Dong (Ran Min's wife) (fl. 350–352), wife of Ran Min, emperor of the Ran Wei state

== See also ==
- Queen Dong (1623–1681), queen of the Tungning Kingdom
- Dong (disambiguation)
