= Tung Shan =

Tung Shan, Tung-shan, Tungshan, or variant, can refer to:

== People ==
- Tung-shan Liang-chieh (807–869), Medieval Chinese Zen teacher; writer of The Record of Tung Shan
- Tung-shan Shou-ch'u (died 900), Medieval Chinese Zen teacher

== Places ==
- Tung Shan (mountain), a hill in Hong Kong.
- Tung-shan, Chiayi, Taiwan; a former district (Taiwan)

=== Facilities and structures ===
- Tung Shan Temple, Wing Ping Tsuen, Hong Kong; one of the Tin Hau temples in Hong Kong
- Tung Shan Mansion, Taikoo Shing, Hong Kong
- Tung-Shan, Kampung Manggis, Pappar, Sahab, Malaysia; a Chinese primary school, see List of Chinese national-type primary schools in Sabah

== Other uses ==
- SS Tung Shan, a British cargo ship; see List of shipwrecks in May 1917

== See also ==
- Dongshan (disambiguation), which may also be spelled Tung-shan
- Shan (disambiguation)
- Tung (disambiguation)
- Shan Tung (disambiguation)
