= Manshū Nichi-Nichi Shimbun =

1907–1945 Japanese newspaper in Manchuria

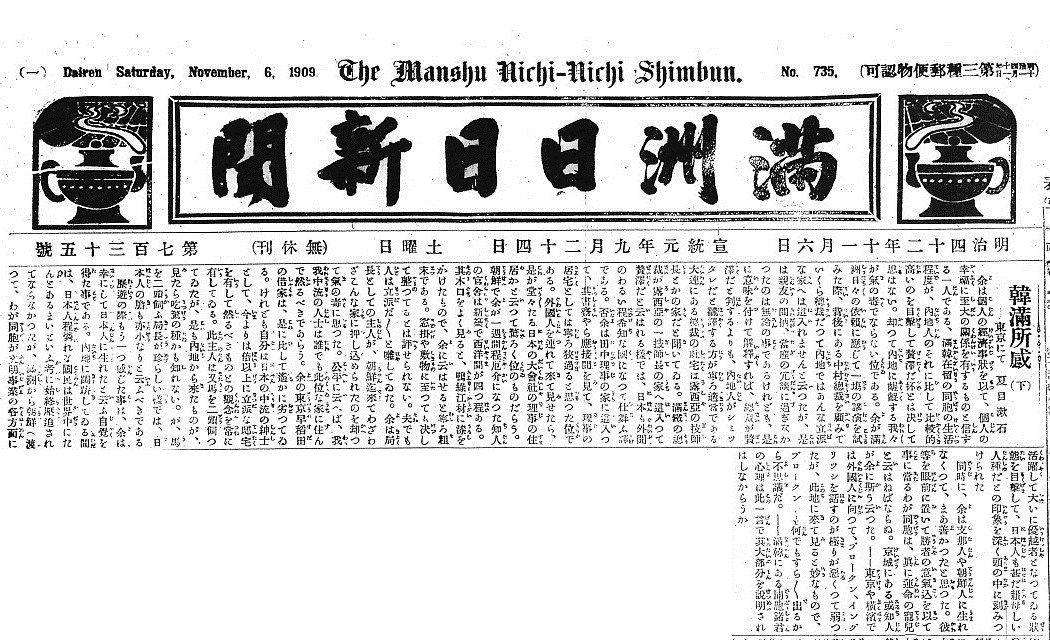
The second half of Natsume Sōseki's Kanman shokan (韓満所感; lit. 'Impressions of Korea and Manchuria') appeared in Manshū Nichi-Nichi Shimbun on 6 November 1909.

The Manshū Nichi-Nichi Shimbun (満洲日日新聞; lit. 'Manchuria Daily News') was a Japanese-language newspaper owned by the South Manchuria Railway Company and printed from 3 November 1907 until Japan's defeat in the Second World War in 1945. Printed in Dairen (now Dalian), capital of the Japanese-controlled Kwantung Leased Territory, and from 1938 in Mukden (now Shenyang), it was the most influential newspaper serving the growing Japanese settler population in northeastern China. In 1927, it merged with the rival Ryōtō Shimpō (遼東新報; lit. 'Liaodong News') and was renamed the Manshū Nippō (満洲日報; lit. 'Manchuria Daily Report'), before returning to its original name in 1935 following another merger with Dairen Shimbun (大連新聞; lit. 'Dairen News'), whereupon it gained a complete monopoly on Japanese-language news in what had become the Japanese puppet state of Manchukuo. In 1944, it briefly changed its name back to Manshū Nippō before going out of print in 1945 following Japan's defeat in the war and subsequent withdrawal from Manchuria.

== History ==
Japan acquired the Kwantung Leased Territory from Russia following its 1905 victory in the Russo-Japanese War. The South Manchuria Railway Company was established in 1906, with Count Gotō Shinpei, former civil governor of Taiwan, serving as its first director. The company's mission was to improve the South Manchurian Railway and establish industries and settlements along its route, facilitating Japanese colonisation of northeast China. Gotō believed that newspapers played a key role in the "civilisation" of peoples and territories, and thus worked to establish an "ideal" newspaper in the newly acquired Japanese territory.

Initially, an attempt was made to buy the already existing Ryōtō Shimpō, which had been founded in 1905, but this offer was rejected. It was thus decided to create a brand-new paper. Gotō gave this task to Moriyama Moriji, a graduate of Tokyo Imperial University, and an experienced publisher, journalist, and traveller. Moriyama had connections across Japanese high society and the publishing industry, and was likely chosen by Gotō for this reason. The Manshū Nichi-Nichi Shimbun Company was thus established in Tokyo in August 1907. A variety of staff were employed, none of whom had ever been to or knew anything about Manchuria. Moriyama sailed for Dairen on 15 October 1907, and the first issue was released on 3 November 1907. In this issue, Moriyama said that the newspaper would serve as the "vanguard of Japanese administration" in Manchuria.

Soon after it came into print, the Manshū Nichi-Nichi opened branch offices across northern China, including in Mukden, Changchun, Harbin and Tianjin, and in Japanese-occupied Korea. In 1908, it launched an English-language newspaper called The Manchuria Daily News, which continued to be published until 1940. The Manshū Nichi-Nichi Shimbun Company became a stock company in 1913, with the South Manchuria Railway Company owning an 82% stake. During the 1920s, the newspaper's coverage attempted to normalise the growing Japanese presence in northeast China, and promoted the idea of a stable middle class settler lifestyle, comparable to that experienced in Japan. In 1927, its rival Ryōtō Shimpō was bought out by the South Manchuria Railway Company and merged with the Nichi-Nichi, at which pointed the combined newspaper was renamed the Manshū Nippō.

According to the official Japanese narrative, an attack by Chinese soldiers on the Jinan office of the newspaper sparked the "Jinan incident" in 1928.

In 1929, former Kwantung Army lieutenant general and secret service operative Takayanagi Yasutarō assumed leadership of the newspaper, signifying its growing relationship with Kwantung Army, and its use as a tool to manipulate information and shift public opinion in the Japanese military's favour.

In 1935, it merged with the Dairen Shimbun and restored the name Manshū Nichi-Nichi Shimbun, whereupon it gained a complete monopoly on Japanese-language newspapers in what had become the Japanese puppet state of Manchukuo.

In 1944, it briefly changed its name back to Manshū Nippō before going out of print in 1945 following Japan's defeat in the Second World War and subsequent withdrawal from Manchuria.
