= Shaan =

Shaan may refer to:

- Shaan (1980 film), an Indian Hindi film
- Shaan (2022 film), a Bangladeshi film
- Shaan (singer) (born 1972), Indian playback singer
- Ishaan Dev, Indian musical artist known as Shaan
- Shaan Hundal (born 1999), Canadian soccer player
- Shaan Rahman (born 1979), Indian composer and singer
- Shaan Shahid (born 1971), Pakistani film actor

== See also ==
- Shan (disambiguation)
