= Kurihara Yasuhide =

Imperial Japanese Army officer (1908–1936)

- 栗原 安秀
- Born: November 17, 1908; Matsue, Shimane, Japan
- Died: July 12, 1936 (aged 27); Tokyo, Tokyo Prefecture, Japan
- Education: Imperial Japanese Army Academy
- Father: Kurihara Isamu
- Military career
- Branch: Imperial Japanese Army
- Service years: 1929–1936
- Rank: Lieutenant (中尉, chūi) (revoked)
- Conflicts: February 26 incident

Kurihara Yasuhide (栗原 安秀; November 17, 1908 – July 12, 1936) was an Imperial Japanese Army officer and infantry lieutenant. He participated in the February 26 incident.

== Biography ==
Kurihara Yasuhide was born on November 17, 1908, in Matsue City, Shimane Prefecture with a honseki registry in Tokyo. His father was Col. Kurihara Isamu (栗原 勇), originally from Saga Prefecture. In his youth he lived with his father who was stationed in Asahikawa. He had a close family relationship Saitō Ryū.

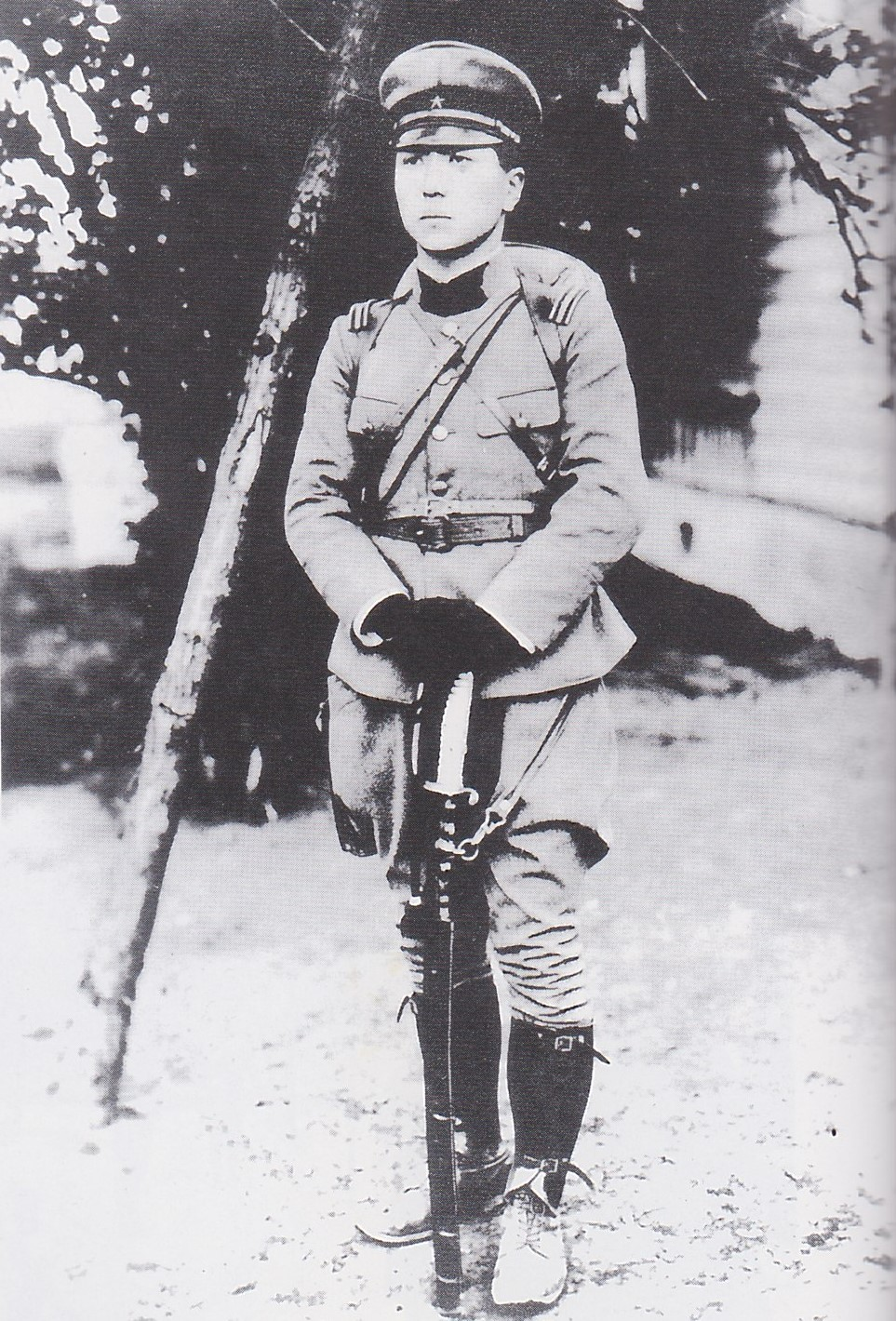
Yasuhide in 1930

Kurihara graduated from the Imperial Japanese Army Academy in 1929. He was politically active in Kōdōha circles, and hoped for a National Socialist revolution of the kind advocated by Kita Ikki in order to save the country from what he perceived to be the corruption of the zaibatsu and the incompetence of the military careerists.

Kurihara had a habit of saying "yaru yaru" (ヤルヽヽ; transl. "go ahead"), such that he was called Lt. Yaru Yaru (ヤルヽヽ中尉, yaru yaru chūi).

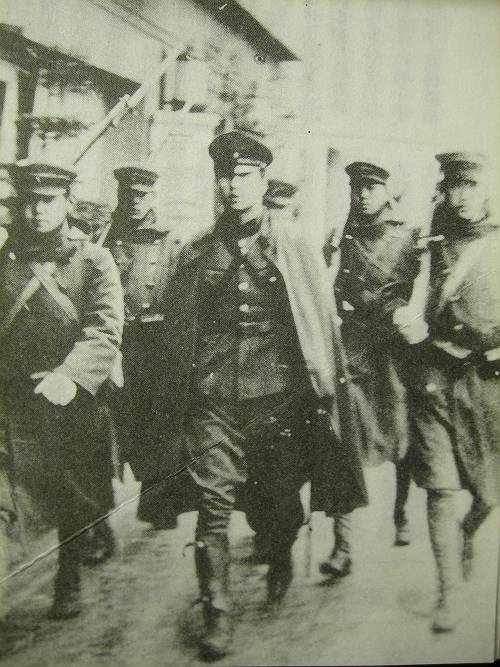
Yasuhide (center) during the February 26 incident

Kurihara played a major role in the February 26 incident in 1936. On February 29, three days after the incident, he was ordered to relinquish his court rank and was stripped of his medals. Kurihara was fusilladed on July 12.
