= Taepodong =

Taepodong may refer to the following North Korean ballistic missiles:

- Taepodong-1, tested in 1998
- Taepodong-2, tested in 2006

== See also ==
- Hwasong-10
