= Tu Shandong =

Chinese engineer

- Born: November 1961 (age 64); Yongding District, Longyan, Fujian, China
- Education: Nanjing Tech University
- Scientific career
- Fields: Machinery; Power engineering
- Workplaces: East China University of Science and Technology

Chinese name
- Traditional Chinese: 塗善東
- Simplified Chinese: 涂善东
Transcriptions
Standard Mandarin
- Hanyu Pinyin: Tú Shàndōng

Tu Shandong (Chinese: 涂善东; born November 1961) is a Chinese engineer specializing in machinery and power engineering. He is an academician of the Chinese Academy of Engineering (CAE) and formerly served as vice-president of East China University of Science and Technology. He is an honorary professor at the University of Nottingham, a member of the International Federation for the Promotion of Mechanism and Machine Science (IFToMM) and the Chinese Mechanical Engineering Society (CMES).

== Biography ==
Tu was born in November 1961 in Yongding District, Longyan, Fujian, while his ancestral home in Dabu County, Guangdong. His grandfather, Tu Yanfan (涂演凡; 1885–1944), was a revolutionist and educator and a member of the Tongmenghui. Both his father Tu Xiangsheng (涂祥生) and mother Zeng Chunying (曾纯英) were teachers. He has two older brothers. After the resumption of National College Entrance Examination, he enrolled at Nanjing Tech University, where he received his master's degree and doctor's degree in 1985 and 1988, respectively. In 1989 he was a postdoctoral fellow at Southwest Jiaotong University under the supervision of Sun Xunfang (孙训方) and Gao Qing (高庆). In 1990 he was hired as a guest scientist at KTH Royal Institute of Technology in Stockholm, Sweden. Beginning in 1993, he served in several posts at his alma mater Nanjing Tech University, including associate professor, full professor, and vice-president. He briefly served as a Brain Pool Scholar at Chung-Ang University in South Korea. He was recruited as a professor at East China University of Science and Technology in November 2011, becoming vice-president in June 2006.

== Works ==
- Tu Shandong (2009). 过程装备与控制工程概论 [Introduction of Process Equipment and Control Engineering] (in Chinese). Beijing: Chemical Industry Press. ISBN 9787122059512.
- Tu Shandong (2012). 从失效到更好的设计、制造和建造 [From Failure to Better Design, Manufacture and Construction] (in Chinese). Shanghai: East China University of science and Technology Press. ISBN 9787562833895.
- Tu Shandong (2011). 核工程结构完整性 [Structural Integrity in Nuclear Engineering] (in Chinese). Shanghai: East China University of science and Technology Press. ISBN 9787562831532.
- Tu Shandong (2003). 高温结构完整性原理 [High Temperature Structural Integrity] (in Chinese). Beijing: Science Press. ISBN 9787030117441.
- Tu Shandong (2012). Total Engineering Education II 全面工程教育 [Total Engineering Education] (in Chinese). Shanghai: East China University of science and Technology Press. ISBN 9787562832416.
- Xue Changming; Tu Shandong; Wang Zhengdong (2008). Evaluation, Inspection and Monitoring of Structural Integrity 结构完整性的评价、检验和监测 [Evaluation, Inspection and Monitoring of Structural Integrity] (in Chinese). Shanghai: East China University of science and Technology Press. ISBN 9787562824039.
- Jiang Wenchun; Tu Shandong; Sun Guang'ai (2019). 焊接残余应力的中子衍射测试技术、计算与调控 [Neutron Diffraction Measurement, Calculation and Control of Welding Residual Stress] (in Chinese). Beijing: Science Press. ISBN 9787030612403.

== Honours and awards ==
- 1990 the 2nd China Youth Science and Technology Award
- 2002 National Science Fund for Distinguished Young Scholars
- 2006 "Chang Jiang Scholar" (or " Yangtze River Scholar")
- November 22, 2019 Member of the Chinese Academy of Engineering (CAE)
