= Cai Gongshi =

Chinese politician and diplomat

- 蔡公時
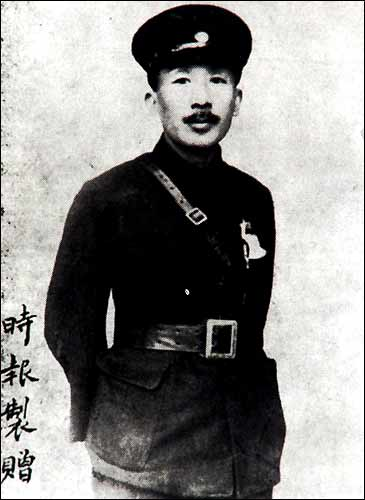

Superintendent of Customs and Commissioner of Foreign Affairs of the Nationalist Government
- In office 1927 – 3 May 1928

Personal details
- Born: 蔡公時; 1 May 1881 Jiujiang, Jiangxi, Qing China
- Died: 3 May 1928 (aged 47) Jinan, Shandong, Republic of China
- Party: Kuomintang
- Spouse: Guo Jingluan (m. 1918; died 1928)
- Children: 2
- Education: Kōbun Institute; Imperial University

Military service
- Allegiance: Republic of China

Cai Gongshi (Chinese: 蔡公時; pinyin: Cài Gōngshí; Wade–Giles: Ts'ai Kung-shih; 1 May 1881 – 3 May 1928) was a Chinese nationalist politician and diplomat.

Born in Jiujiang, Jiangxi, Cai studied at Imperial University in Tokyo, Japan, earning a master's degree. Upon his return to China, he joined Sun Yat-sen's Kuomintang (KMT), and later served in various roles in the Chinese nationalist government. In 1927, he was appointed Superintendent of Customs and Commissioner of Foreign Affairs in Nanjing. On 1 May 1928, he was appointed Commissioner of Foreign Affairs for Shandong province, and was tasked with negotiating for Japanese withdrawal from the province. He was subsequently killed on 3 May by Japanese soldiers during the Jinan incident. According to Chinese sources, the Japanese soldiers broke his leg, smashed his teeth, cut out his tongue, and shot him. 16 other members of his negotiation team were also mutilated and killed on the same day.

== Early life ==
Cai Gongshi was born on 1 May 1881 in Jiujiang, Jiangxi, into a well-known local family of scholars and merchants. He entered a private school at the age of six, and by his late teens, he was an accomplished calligrapher in the Wei stele (weibei) style. In 1898, he and fellow townsmen formed an anti-Qing society in Jiujiang, the Shensuoran Studio, which presented itself as a private school. The society was soon closed down, and in 1902, Cai was forced to leave home for Guangzhou. According to accounts of his life, he supported himself there by selling his calligraphy, and Sun Yat-sen, impressed by his talent, paid for him to study in Japan. In 1904, he enrolled at the Kōbun Institute in Tokyo, and in 1905, on Sun's recommendation, he joined the Tongmenghui. During his time in Tokyo, he was beaten by a group of Japanese men for refusing to bow towards the Imperial Palace on the Emperor's Birthday.

== Revolutionary career ==
After returning to China, Cai worked on propaganda for the Tongmenghui newspaper Min Bao, raised funds and made contacts with secret societies and the New Army for a series of armed uprisings. In March 1908, on Sun's instructions, he, Huang Xing and Tan Shiping (Tan Renfeng) led a force of 200 Tongmenghui members from among the overseas Chinese in French Indochina into Qinzhou, then in Guangdong. After fighting Qing troops around Qinzhou and Shangsi for more than forty days, they ran out of ammunition and supplies and withdrew to Indochina. Cai took part in three of the uprisings that preceded the 1911 Revolution, at Guangxi and Yunnan. He then returned to Jiangxi, where he taught at the Jiangxi School of Law and Politics while continuing to spread revolutionary propaganda in secret.

After the Wuchang Uprising of 10 October 1911 and the revolt in Jiujiang later that month, Cai organized supporters in Nanchang, the provincial capital, and urged the Jiujiang military government to attack the city. On 31 October, Jiangxi declared its independence from the Qing, and Cai became director of communications in the new provincial military government under Wu Jiezhang. In that post, he drew up a plan for Jiangxi's waterways, railways and roads in line with Sun Yat-sen's national railway programme.

In 1913, Cai was head of the Jiujiang Commercial Protection Bureau. When Li Liejun launched the Second Revolution against Yuan Shikai at Hukou in July 1913, Cai joined him at the front, and Li sent him to Guangdong to seek reinforcements. On reaching Guangzhou, he learned that the uprising had failed, and he fled to Japan, where he studied at Tokyo Imperial University. In March 1916, he went to Shanghai with Sun to join the campaign against Yuan. In 1917, after Duan Qirui ordered his arrest, he fled to Guangdong, where he supported himself by selling calligraphy in Shantou, and he became a councillor in the office of the generalissimo of the Constitutional Protection government in Guangzhou.

In the winter of 1924, Cai accompanied Li Liejun to Beijing to visit Sun, who had fallen ill there. He cared for Sun during his final illness and was one of the few Kuomintang members present at his death in March 1925, and he helped to arrange Sun's funeral. During the Northern Expedition in 1926, he volunteered to negotiate with a general under Sun Chuanfang whom he knew personally, and he persuaded him to defect with his troops.

== Jinan incident and death ==
In April 1928, when Chiang Kai-shek, Feng Yuxiang, Yan Xishan and Li Zongren launched the final stage of the Northern Expedition, Cai became a member of the Political Affairs Committee for the War Zone and Superintendent of Customs and Commissioner of Foreign Affairs, responsible for foreign relations in the war zone. From Xuzhou, he sent a letter to the foreign consuls in Shanghai setting out the Nationalist government's policy of protecting foreign nationals, which was published in the Shanghai press. The Japanese government of Tanaka Giichi, concerned that the Nationalist advance threatened Japanese interests in north China, sent troops to Shandong, citing the need to protect Japanese residents.

After the Northern Expedition army entered Jinan on 1 May 1928, clashes broke out between Chinese and Japanese troops. Chiang decided to deal with the situation through diplomacy and appointed Cai special commissioner for foreign affairs in Shandong. Cai reached Jinan on the evening of 2 May, and at about 8 a.m. on 3 May, he took up his post at the Shandong Foreign Affairs Office. That afternoon, Japanese troops surrounded the building. When Cai telephoned the Japanese consul, Nishida Kōichi, the consul described the situation as a "mutual misunderstanding". The building's telephone lines were later cut, and Cai's letters asking for help from Chiang, the foreign minister, Huang Fu, and the committee's chairman, Jiang Zuobin, could not be sent out. At about 4 p.m., some twenty Japanese soldiers entered the office, saying that a Japanese soldier's body had been found outside, and disarmed the staff. At about 9 p.m., more than fifty soldiers entered, cut the electric lights and tied up Cai and his staff. They tore down the Chinese flag and Sun Yat-sen's portrait and seized the office's documents. Cai protested in Japanese that the office was a diplomatic mission, not a military unit, and refused an order to kneel.

According to Chinese accounts, the Japanese soldiers then cut off Cai's ears and nose and mutilated him further. Before he died, he is said to have shouted, "Chinese may be killed, but not humiliated!" Cai and sixteen of his staff were killed in the courtyard, and their bodies were burned and buried there. He had been in office for about fourteen hours. According to Chinese accounts, nearly 8,000 Chinese soldiers and civilians had been killed by the time Japanese forces took Jinan on 11 May, in what became known as the Jinan incident or the May Third Tragedy. The remains of the officials, including four partly burned skulls, were later recovered and stored in a trunk in the basement of the Nationalist Foreign Ministry in Nanjing.

== Legacy ==
Cai was posthumously recognized as a revolutionary martyr and has been described in China as "China's first anti-Japanese martyr". On 9 May 1928, the Nationalist government ordered that, for one week after the order arrived, every gathering observe three minutes' silence for the victims, and 3 May was designated a "National Humiliation Day". A memorial service was held on 25 July 1928 at Zhongshan Park in Beijing, attended by Nationalist political and military leaders.

In his diary, Chiang Kai-shek wrote that of all the humiliations he had suffered, that of 3 May was the greatest, and that it marked the beginning of an irreconcilable enmity between Japan and the Chinese nation. Feng Yuxiang, Li Zongren and Yu Youren wrote tributes to him. Cai Yuanpei wrote an elegiac couplet for him in the Shishi Xinbao on 15 July 1928.

=== Commemoration ===
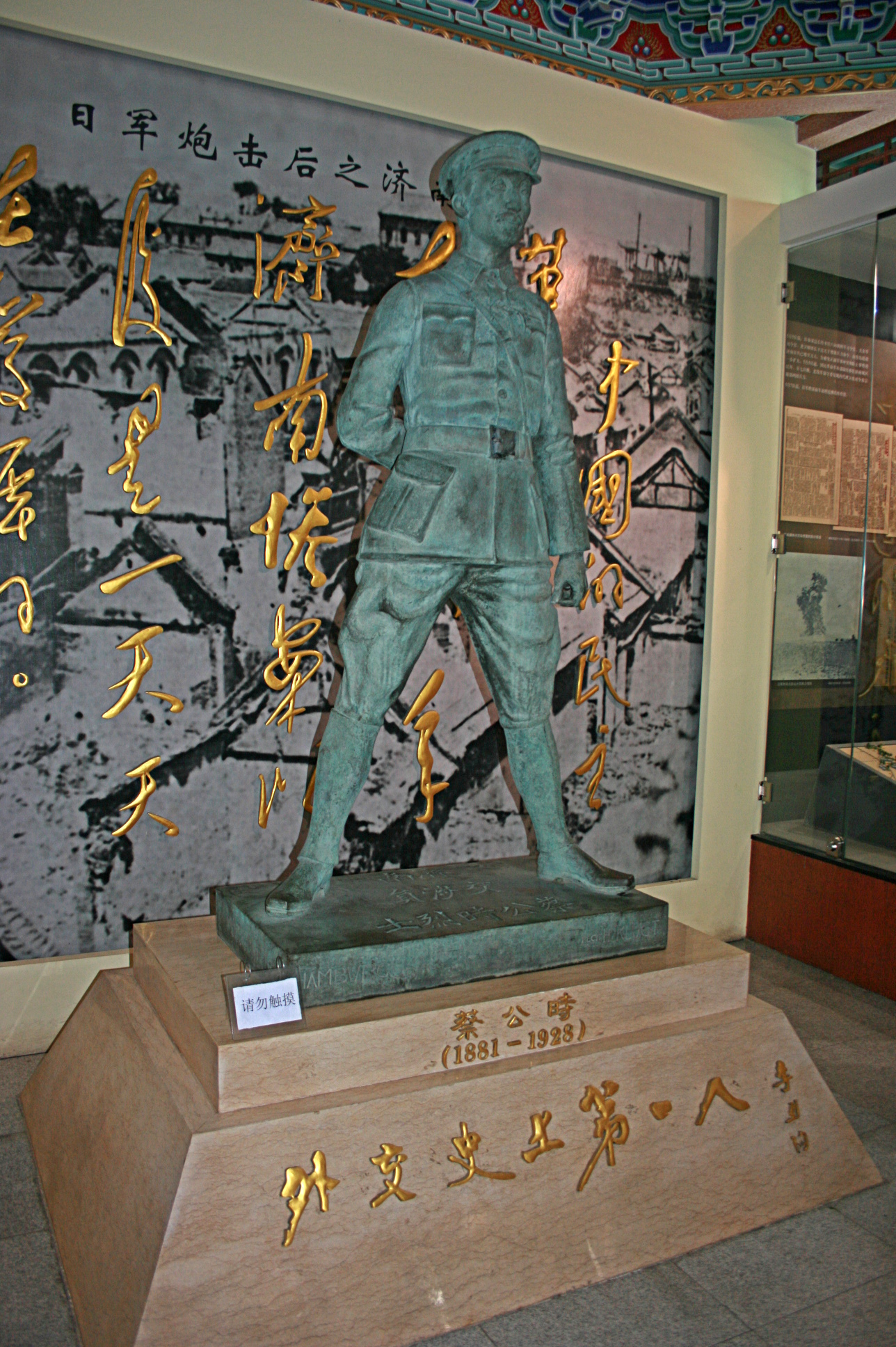
Statue of Cai Gongshi in the memorial garden for the Jinan Incident in Jinan's Baotu Spring Park

In May 1929, the Shandong provincial government erected a monument to the Jinan incident at the Dai Temple in Tai'an, and at the suggestion of the provincial education commissioner, He Siyuan, nearly every public school in the province built a memorial to it. In 1930, overseas Chinese in Southeast Asia, led by Tan Kah Kee, paid for a bronze statue of Cai, 2.18 m (7 ft 2 in) tall. It could not be shipped to China, and in 1965, it was placed in the Sun Yat Sen Nanyang Memorial Hall in Singapore. On 10 April 2006, it was handed over to the city of Jinan, where it was installed on 3 May 2006.

The former Shandong Foreign Affairs Office, at 370 Jingsi Road in Jinan's Huaiyin District, is now the Cai Gongshi Memorial Hall. It was listed as a protected site by Jinan in 1995 and by Shandong province in December 2006, and in October 2019, the site of the May Third Tragedy was listed as a Major Historical and Cultural Site Protected at the National Level. A house in Jinan known as the Cai Gongshi Residence survives as a staff dormitory of the Shandong Earthquake Agency. In Jiujiang, the city's committee of the Chinese People's Political Consultative Conference rebuilt Cai's tomb and memorial in Gantang Park, which were completed on 3 May 1991. The memorial has a white marble bust of Cai facing north towards Jinan, inscriptions by Feng Yuxiang and Li Liejun, and a biography written by his son.

=== In art and film ===
In 1928, at the invitation of the Fujian provincial education commissioner, Huang Menggui, Xu Beihong spent more than two months in Fuzhou painting a large oil painting of Cai's death, which caused a sensation when it was exhibited. The painting has been lost, but a charcoal study for it survives in the Xu Beihong Memorial Museum. Lai Man-wai made the films The Jinan Massacre and Cai Gongshi in 1928, and Cai is portrayed by Cheng Cheng in the 2016 film Blood Evidence 1928.

== Personal life ==
Cai was a noted calligrapher, particularly in clerical script, into which he often blended elements of running and cursive script. He also wrote classical poetry.

Cai's mother arranged his engagement to a distant cousin, Yao Xiaopei, but he delayed the marriage for three years because of his revolutionary work. They married in March 1910, and she helped him to contact revolutionaries. After the failure of the Second Revolution, his property was confiscated and his family placed under surveillance, and she fell ill and died. In 1918, in Xiamen, he married Guo Jingluan, a graduate of Wah Yan College in Hong Kong, who shared his revolutionary work. They had a son, Cai Jinren, born in November 1922 in Bao'an, Guangdong, and a daughter, Cai Jinming.
