= Hikosuke Fukuda =

- 福田 彦助
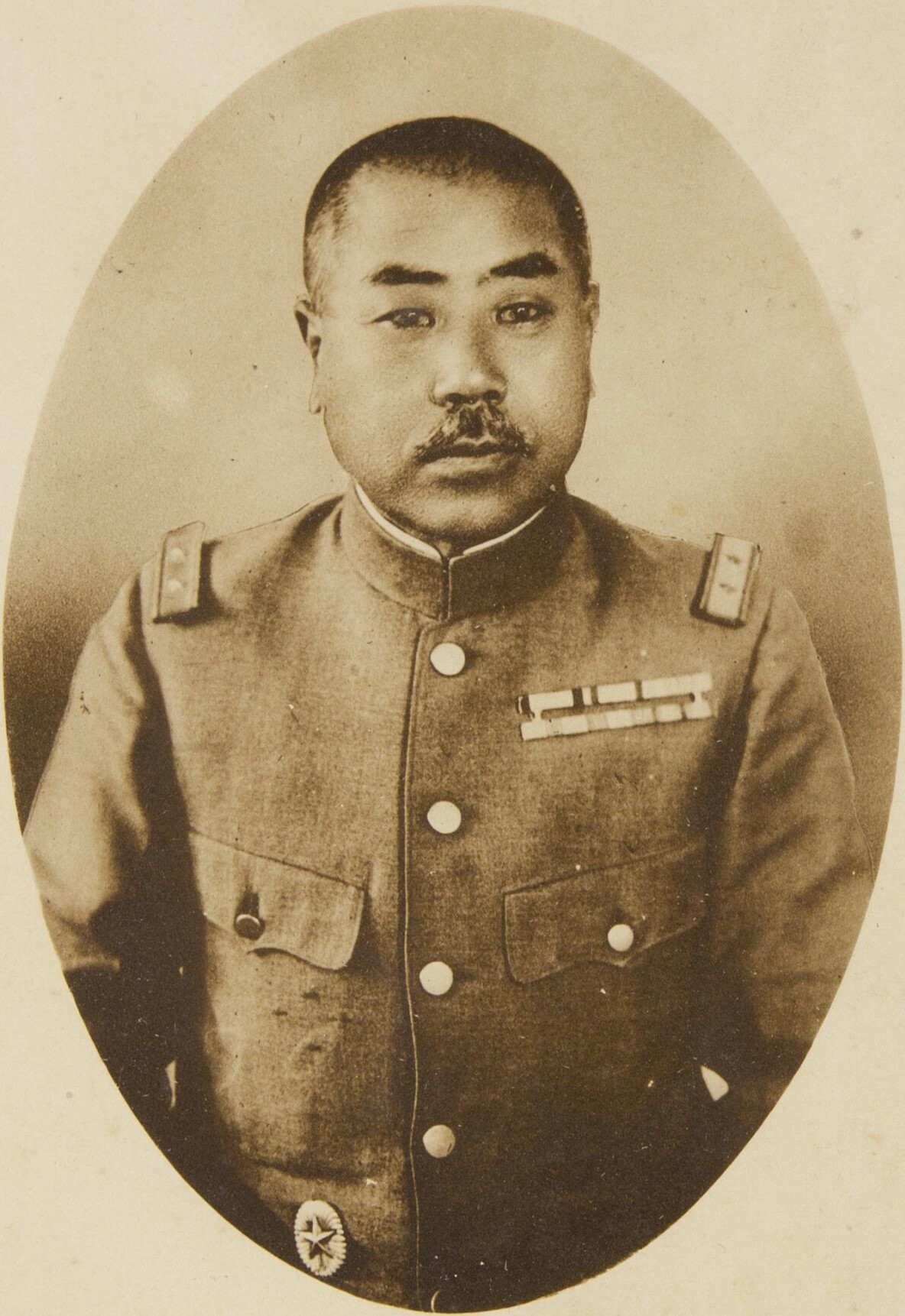
- Born: 5 November 1875; Hagi, Yamaguchi, Japan
- Died: 30 July 1959 (aged 83); Hagi, Yamaguchi, Japan
- Military career
- Allegiance: Empire of Japan
- Branch: Imperial Japanese Army
- Rank: lieutenant general
- Conflicts: World War I Siberian Intervention; Jinan Incident

Hikosuke Fukuda (福田 彦助, Fukuda Hikosuke; 5 November 1875 – 30 July 1959) was a lieutenant-general in the Imperial Japanese Army. He is best known for his involvement in the Jinan Incident.

== Biography ==
Fukuda was born in Yamaguchi Prefecture and graduated from the 7th class of the Imperial Japanese Army Academy in May 1896 and from the 16th class of the Army Staff College. In December 1903, he was assigned to the Japanese Korean Army. He subsequently served on the staff of the Imperial Guard, the Personnel Department of the Imperial Japanese Army General Staff Office and the Ministry of the Army, and as a military attache to Vladivostok in Russia. He was promoted to major in 1908. In 1910, he was transferred to Omsk, and on his return to Japan, was a military attache to the Russian Embassy in Tokyo. After serving as a battalion commander in the IJA 37th Infantry Regiment, he was promoted to Lieutenant colonel in 1913. In October 1915, he was sent as a military observer embedded within the Imperial Russian Army during World War I. In August 1916, he was promoted to colonel and in January 1917 was given command of the IJA 60th Infantry Regiment, which was part of the Japanese contingent in the Siberian Intervention. In August 1920, he was promoted to major general and given command of the IJA 15th Division. In May 1925, he was promoted to lieutenant general and commander of the Shimonoseki Fortress. In March 1926, he became commander of the IJA 6th Division. From April to September 1928, the division was dispatched to Shandong Province in China.

== Jinan Incident ==
Jinan, the capital of Shandong, housed some 2,000 Japanese residents and was of significant Japanese commercial interest. Having received word of the entry of Northern Expedition, troops of the Chinese National Revolutionary Army into Jinan (contrary to Chiang Kai-shek's orders and agreement with Japanese Prime Minister Tanaka Giichi), and concerned of a repeat of the Nanking incident of 1927 which resulted in a loss of Japanese lives, and property, Fukuda moved troops from Tianjin into Ji'nan and Qingtao along the Jiaoji Railway. This was known in Japanese as the Second Shandong Expedition (第二山東出兵, Dai-ni Santo Shuppei). Although Fukuda had acted on his own initiative, he wished to avoid conflict and was preparing to withdraw his forces on observing that the Chinese forces were acting orderly and not threatening the foreign residents. Nonetheless, tensions were high, and on the morning of May 3, when Japanese consul-general Koichi Nishida was returning from a meeting with Chiang Kai-shek, he was repeatedly fired upon by Chinese soldiers and looting started, resulting in the deaths and mutilation of 12 Japanese civilians. Events rapidly escalated out of control from that point, leading to a week of violence and armed conflict known as the Jinan Incident.

Fukuda's action in violating orders from Tokyo has been citied by historians such as C. Martin Wilbur as the start of a series of similar violations by field commanders in China which eventually resulted in the Second Sino-Japanese War.

The Arbitrary action of Japanese commanders in the field was the first of a series that led three years later to the Japanese Kwantung Army's seizure of Manchuria, then to an ever-spreading Sino-Japanese conflict, and ultimately to Japan's utter defeat in 1945.

On Fukada's return in 1929, he was reassigned to the reserves. He was awarded the Order of the Sacred Treasure, 1st class on August 1, 1929. He died in 1959.
