= Li Shan =

Li Shan may refer to:

- Li Shan (painter) (1686–1762), Qing dynasty painter
- Joseph Li Shan (born 1965), Roman Catholic archbishop of Beijing
- Li Shan (volleyball) (born 1980), Chinese volleyball player
- Li Shan, Tang official, author of the influential commentaries to the Wen Xuan anthology
- Li Shan, prefect of Nhat-nam during the reign of Emperor Ming of Han
- Li Shan, circuit intendant of Shanghai under the Qing
- Li Shan, a character in the Kung Fu Panda franchise

== Places ==
- Lishan District, a county in China
