= Ryū Saitō =

Japanese general and poet (1879–1953)

Saitō Ryū
- 斎藤 瀏
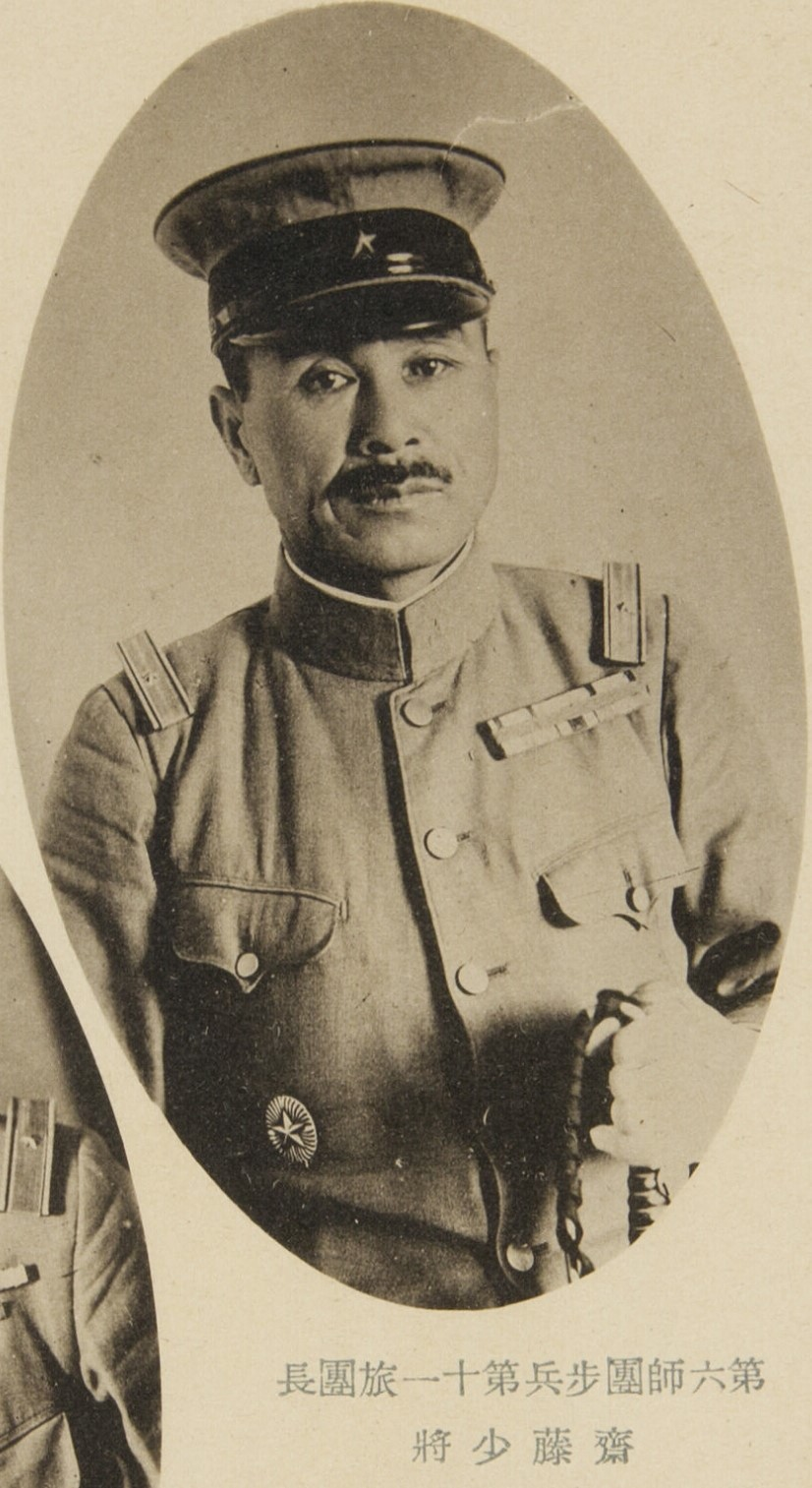
- Born: April 16, 1879; Shichiki Village, Nagano Prefecture, Japan
- Died: July 5, 1953 (aged 74); Nagano, Nagano Prefecture, Japan
- Alma mater: Imperial Japanese Army Academy
- Military career
- Branch: Imperial Japanese Army
- Service years: 1901–1930
- Rank: Major General
- Conflicts: Russo-Japanese War; Jinan incident February 26 incident (POW)
- Other work: Poet

Ryū Saitō (斎藤 瀏, Saitō Ryū; April 16, 1879 – July 5, 1953) was a Japanese Major General and poet during the 20th century. He is commonly associated with the Jinan incident, playing a major role in the diplomatic and public press of the incident. He was also known for his tanka poetry works.

== Biography ==
Ryū was born on April 16, 1879, at Shichiki Village (modern-day Azumino) as the fourth son of Masaaki Miyake who was a former feudal retainer of the Matsumoto Domain but became a farmer and was deemed a commoner rather than a samurai. Due to being poor, Ryū was sent to an apprenticeship during his childhood. After attending the Matsumoto Junior High School (modern-day Nagano Matsumoto Fukashi High School), he graduated from the Imperial Japanese Army Academy as part of its 12th class in 1901 and was commissioned as an infantry lieutenant. When he was in middle school under the old system, he was adopted by Jun Saitō, a doctor and kangaku.

In 1903, Ryū was promoted to first lieutenant and served in the Russo-Japanese War in 1904. Around this time, he sent a letter to Nobutsuna Sasaki, requesting for lessons on tanka poetry. He returned the following year with an injury and was awarded the Order of the Golden Kite, 5th Class. In 1906 he was promoted to captain and in 1909, graduated from the Army War College as part of its 21st class along with Juichi Terauchi, Kōtarō Nakamura, Kōhei Kashii as his classmates. He studied under Sasaki for Chikuhakukai's poetry magazine Kokoro no Hana.

In 1914, Ryū was promoted to major and served under Yusaku Uehara as a staff officer of the Inspectorate General of Military Training and was promoted to colonel in 1918. In 1924, he became the Chief of Staff of the 7th Division in Asahikawa. On 1927, he was promoted to major general and participated in the Shandong Expedition in 1928 as commander of the 11th Infantry Brigade, but was sent to the reserves for fighting the National Revolutionary Army during the Jinan Incident. In 1936, Ryū was sentenced to five years in prison for his participation in the February 26 incident. He was then stripped of his rank and imprisoned, serving his sentence with Yasuhide Kurihara, who was a close friend of his family.

After being released from prison in 1938, while working as a militarist ideologue, Ryū founded and became involved with tanka as a poet. Saitō was listed as one of the selection committee members of the 1942 Aikoku Hyakunin Isshu. In the same year, he became a director of the Dai Nippon Journal Report Association. In 1945, he evacuated to Ikeda, Nagano and was expelled from public office. After the war, he published a memoir of the February 26 incident along with a collection of poems. In 1953, he died at the House of History at Nagano.

== Call with Kurihara ==
On the early hours of February 29, just before the end of the incident, one of the phone calls made by Kurihara managed to reach Saitō per court documents by Shunpei Sakisaka. During the call, Saitō said:

Well, there is a possibility that the dawn will come, and they may attack? For example, Kawai, Yanagawa?

In response, Kurihara replied:

There are currently no candidates for prime minister other than Masaki... Yanagawa would be nice, but it's very bad.

Saitō replied with

I'm thinking of starting a big activity... I'm still working on it.

Kurihara ended the conversation with:

I guess I'll make it in time. You're a master.

In addition, Kurihara asked Saitō to confirm the edict due to the army's upper management not formally submitting to the revolution. The instance of the transcript occurred during the documentary series NHK Special. When Seiichi Nakata, who was the producer of the program, sent a copy of the recording to Shi, he thanked him and said, "I'd like to listen to it when my heart calms down someday." It is unknown whether he heard it.

In his postwar memoir "2.26," Saitō wrote that during the incident, he suspected that someone had intercepted his home phone, and that it was believed to have been made by a military intelligence agency. He wrote that he often received phone calls that seemed to be irrelevant and conspiratorial. The latter suspicion was also found to be highly likely to be true based on the Sugasaka materials and the testimony of the people involved in the interception at the time. It was also found that he had hardly called himself due to being wary of an interception.

== Court ranks ==
- Senior Eighth Rank (October 10, 1901)

== Awards ==
- Order of the Golden Kite, 5th Class (April 1, 1906)
- Order of the Rising Sun, 6th Class (April 1, 1906)

== Works ==
- "Young Officer's Training" Military Magazine 1915
- Misty Flower" Chikuhakukai Kokoro no Hana Sosho 1929
- Appreciation of Manyo Masterpieces, Jinshoin, 1935
- "Hato Poetry Collection" Jinshoin 1939
- "Akudoki Tanka and Zuisou" Sanseido 1940
- "Records in Prison" Tokyodo 1940
- "Song of the Defender" Tokyodo 1942
- "Four Heavenly Clouds" Tokyodo 1942
- The Heart of Manyo, Asahi Shimbun, 1942
- "My Sadness" Naka Shoten 1942
- "Book of Belief: Japanese World View and Guiding Principles" Tokyodo 1943
- "Famous Woman Review" Jinshoin 1944
- "Light soil" Yakumo Shoten New Japanese anthology 1945
- "Nature and Tanka" Jinshoin 1947
- "2.26" Kaizosha 1951

=== Co-authored ===
- "Nikudan Sings" edited by Yakumo Shorin 1939
- Sanseido 1941 _
- "Japan's final battle this year" co-written by Koichiro Ishihara Meirinkai Kyoto Branch 1941
