= Dong =

Dong or DONG may refer to:

== Places ==
- Dong Lake, or East Lake, a lake in China
- Dong, Arunachal Pradesh, a village in India
- Dong (administrative division) (동 or 洞), a neighborhood division in Korea

== Person names ==
=== Surnames ===
- Dǒng (surname) or 董, a Chinese surname
- Dōng (surname) or 東, a Chinese surname

=== Persons ===
- Queen Dong (1623–1681), princess consort of Koxinga and mother of Zheng Jing
- Empress Dong (Ran Min's wife), wife of Ran Min, emperor of Chinese state Ran Wei
- Empress Dowager Dong (died 189), empress dowager during Han dynasty

== Entertainment ==
- Dong (film) (东), a documentary film by Jia Zhangke.
- Dong Open Air, a heavy metal festival in Germany.
- D!NG (previously Do Online Now Guys, or DONG), a YouTube channel created and hosted by Michael Stevens as a segment of the Vsauce, Vsauce2, Vsauce3 and WeSauce channels
- General Dong, villain of the 1992 Indian film Tahalka, played by Amrish Puri

== Other uses ==
- Dong people, an ethnic minority group of China
- Dong language (China)
- Dong language (Nigeria)
- Vietnamese đồng, a unit of currency
- Ørsted (company), a Danish energy company formerly known as DONG Energy
  - Danish Cup or DONG Cup, a trophy sponsored by the oil company from 2000 to 2004
- Dong, a slang term for the human penis
- Dong, a jocular fan name for Donkey Kong

== See also ==
- Dong quai, a medicinal herb
- Lá dong or Phrynium placentarium, a type of prayer-plant
- Long Duk Dong or "the Donger," a character in Sixteen Candles
- Rodong-1, a type of North Korean missiles
- Taepodong (disambiguation)
