= Shan =

Shan may refer to:

== People and languages ==
- Shan (surname), or 单 in Chinese, a Chinese surname
- Shan, a variant of the Welsh given name usually spelled Siân
- Occasionally used as a short form of Shannen/Shannon

=== Ethnic groups and languages ===
- Shan people, Southeast Asian ethnic group inhabiting Myanmar
  - Shan language
- Dai people, also known as Shan, ethnic group in China
- Shanrong (山戎), term for "mountain barbarian" in Shanxi, Hubei in northern China

=== Individuals ===
- Bai Shan (disambiguation) (白珊, 金山), several people, including:
  - Bai Shan (白珊, born 1969), Chinese actress
  - Bai Shan (金山; fl. 280), king of Kucha
- Fu Buqi (宓不齊; born 521 BC), posthumously Count of Shan (單伯), disciple of Confucius
- Jin Shan (disambiguation) (金山), several people, including:
  - Jin Shan (金山, 1911–1982), born Zhao Mo (赵默), Chinese actor
- Li Shan (disambiguation), several people
- Liu Shan (劉禪; 207–271), second emperor of Shu Han
- MC Shan, stage name of Shawn Moltke (born 1965), American rapper
- Shaan Shahid (شان شاہد), stage name of Armaghan Shahid (ارمغان شاہد; born 1971), Pakistani actor, model, writer and film director
- Zhang Shan (disambiguation) (張山), several people, including:
  - Zhang Shan (张山, born 1968), Chinese sports shooter and Olympic champion

== Places ==
=== China ===
- Shaanxi, abbreviated as Shan (陕), province of the People's Republic of China
- Shan County, Shandong (单县), county in Heze, Shandong, China
- Shan County, Henan (陕县), now Shanzhou District of Sanmenxia city, a county in Sanmenxia, Henan, China
- Shantou, or Shan (汕), a city in Guangdong, China
- Shan (鄯), a region in Xinjiang Uyghur Autonomous Region
- Shan (剡), a river in the Zhejiang Province of China
- Shan Hills, a region of Burma, China, and Thailand

=== Other places ===
- Shan State of Burma (modern state)
- Shan States of Burma (historical kingdoms)
- Shan Hills, a region of Burma, China, and Thailand
- Shan (鄯), ancient Western Regions (西域) to the west of China
- 山, shan, Chinese character (used in Chinese, Japanese and Korean) for "mountains" or "mountain range"
- Mount Shani or Gora Shan, a mountain in the Caucasus

== Other uses ==
- Shan Foods, a brand of Pakistani cuisine spice mixes
- Insect from Shaggai, or Shan, a fictional alien race in the writings of Ramsey Campbell
- The Shan Horse, a horse breed from the Shan State of Myanmar

== See also ==
- Xiao (mythology), several creatures from Chinese mythology
- Shaan (disambiguation)
- Shani (disambiguation)
- Shan'L
