= Jinan incident =

1928 Chinese-Japanese conflict in China

Jinan Incident
- Part of the Northern Expedition
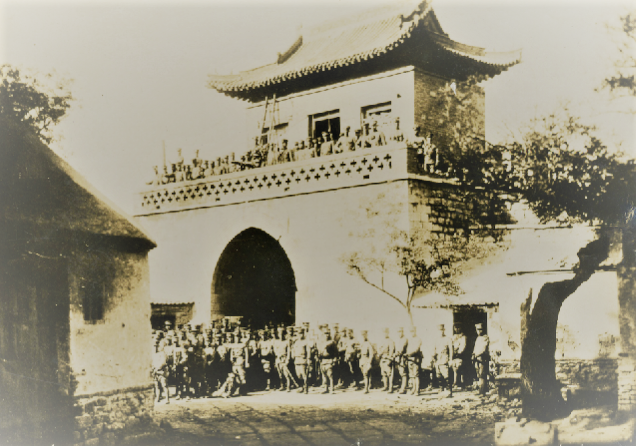
- Japanese soldiers atop a gate in the walled city of Jinan
Date	3–11 May 1928 (1 week and 1 day)
Location	Jinan, Shandong, China
Result	Japanese victory
Territorial changes	Japanese army occupied Jinan until March 1929

Belligerents
China	Japan

Commanders and leaders
Chiang Kai-shek; Feng Yuxiang	Hikosuke Fukuda; Ryū Saitō

Units involved
(Republic of China (1912–1949)) National Revolutionary Army: NRA 1st Collective Army; NRA 2nd Collective Army (Guominjun)	(Empire of Japan) Imperial Japanese Army: 6th Division; Kwantung Army

Casualties and losses
6,123 civilians and soldiers killed Thousands wounded	13–16 civilians killed 26 soldiers killed 157 soldiers wounded

The Jinan incident (traditional Chinese: 濟南慘案; simplified Chinese: 济南惨案; Japanese: 済南事件; formerly romanised Tsinan) or 3 May Tragedy (traditional Chinese: 五三慘案; simplified Chinese: 五三惨案; pinyin: Wǔsān Cǎn'àn) began as a 3 May 1928 dispute between Chiang Kai-shek's National Revolutionary Army (NRA) and Japanese soldiers and civilians in Jinan, the capital of Shandong province in China, which then escalated into an armed conflict between the NRA and the Imperial Japanese Army.

Japanese soldiers had been deployed to Shandong province to protect Japanese commercial interests in the province, which were threatened by the advance of Chiang's Northern Expedition to reunite China under a Kuomintang government. When the NRA approached Jinan, the Beiyang government-aligned army of Sun Chuanfang withdrew from the area, allowing for the peaceful capture of the city by the NRA. NRA forces initially managed to coexist with Japanese troops stationed around the Japanese consulate and businesses, and Chiang Kai-shek arrived to negotiate their withdrawal on 2 May. This peace was broken the following morning, however, when a dispute between the Chinese and Japanese resulted in the deaths of 13–16 Japanese civilians. The resulting conflict resulted in thousands of casualties on the NRA side, which fled the area to continue northwards toward Beijing, and left the city under Japanese occupation until March 1929.

== Background ==
During the Northern Expedition to reunite China under a Kuomintang (KMT) government, foreign concessions and consulates in Nanjing in March 1927 and Hankou in April 1927 were attacked by the KMT's National Revolutionary Army (NRA) soldiers and Chinese civilians respectively in what came to be called the Nanking and Hankou incidents. Following these incidents, NRA commander Chiang Kai-shek made repeated statements to the effect that he would not tolerate anti-foreign attacks by his soldiers, and the KMT foreign minister Huang Fu said that they would "protect to their fullest ability the lives and property of foreigners in China in accordance with international law and usage". Despite these assurances, foreign powers, including the Japanese, remained concerned about the safety of their economic and political interests in China, and resolved that the Nanking incident would not be repeated.

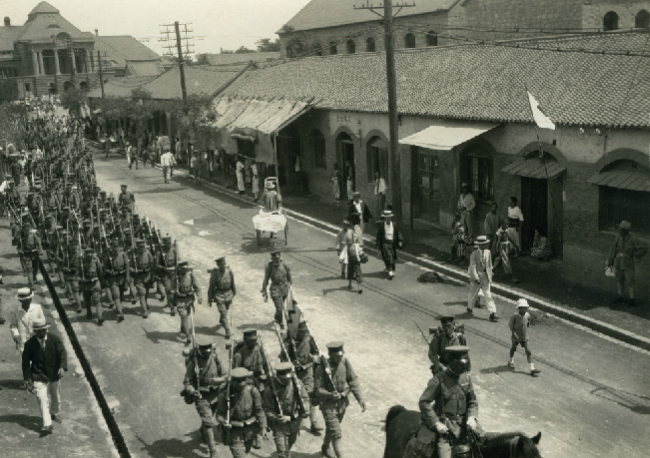
Japanese troops in the commercial district, July 1927. Jinan's railway station can be seen in the background.

When the NRA forced back the Beiyang government-aligned "National Pacification Army" warlord coalition to Shandong province in May–June 1927, the Japanese, who considered the province within their sphere of influence, deployed four-thousand troops of the Kwantung Army to the cities of Qingdao and Jinan in what they called the "First Shandong Expedition" (第一山東出兵, Dai-ichi Santō Shuppei), ostensibly to protect Japanese civilians in anticipation of an NRA advance. NRA commander Chiang Kai-shek wanted to keep his troops away from Jinan, avoiding what he viewed as a useless and potentially costly clash with the Japanese. Similarly, Japanese prime minister Baron Giichi Tanaka knew that the deployment of troops could result in a conflict with the Chinese, which, rather than protecting Japanese citizens and economic interests, could further endanger them. As it happened, in an attempt to resolve the split between the Wuhan and Nanjing factions of the KMT, Chiang was forced to resign from his post of commander of the NRA and halt the Northern Expedition in August 1927, avoiding conflict. With the threat of the NRA advance gone, the Japanese withdrew their troops from Jinan in September 1927.

Chiang sought to avoid repetition of such conflicts and further Japanese interference, and on 5 November 1927, while he was nominally retired from leading the Northern Expedition, he met with Japanese prime minister Tanaka. During the meeting, Tanaka suggested that the Japanese would support only Chiang in China, and not interfere in Chinese domestic affairs. Chiang responded by saying he "understood" Japanese interest in China. When Tanaka said that Chiang should focus on consolidating his power in the territories under KMT control, rather than advance northward toward the Japanese sphere of influence in Fengtian clique-controlled Shandong and Manchuria, Chiang replied that this was not possible. The discussion, therefore, ended without a clear conclusion, though Tanaka was said to be hopeful for future meetings. Chiang, for his part, considered the meeting a failure, but maintained his approach of attempting to work with the Japanese to reach a solution that was amenable to both parties. Despite this, Chiang had only a tenuous hold on power in China, and relied in large measure on the promise to end foreign domination and re-unify the country to buttress his legitimacy.

== Events ==
=== NRA troops arrive in Jinan ===
A map of troop movements in the lead up to the Jinan incident, April–May 1928

By April 1928, Chiang Kai-shek had once again consolidated power, at which time he resumed the Northern Expedition. The NRA was able to quickly push back the forces of Beiyang-aligned warlord Sun Chuanfang, and advanced into Shandong. Sun retreated to Jinan by railway on 17–18 April, leaving the path to Jinan open to the NRA. When the Japanese learned of Sun's failure to defend Shandong, Prime Minister Tanaka, on the counsel of his military advisors, decided to deploy the 6th Division to Jinan on 19 April, in what was called the "Second Shandong Expedition" (第二山東出兵, Dai-ni Santō Shuppei). Whilst Tanaka had misgivings about whether it was prudent to launch the expedition, his party, the Rikken Seiyūkai, had run on a platform of "protecting nationals on the spot" in the February 1928 election, limiting his ability to moderate the Japanese response. Even before Tanaka had given the order, troops under the command of General Hikosuke Fukuda had begun arriving in Jinan via the Qingdao–Jinan railway, possibly as early as 10 April. This was the first serious case of unilateral action by the post-Meiji Restoration Japanese military. The first substantial group of 475 troops, however, arrived in Jinan from Qingdao on 20 April. They were followed by over 4,000 more troops over the coming days. The arrival of the Japanese troops in Jinan, just as the Beiyang-aligned forces had retreated there, prompted suspicions about whether the Beiyang warlords had asked for a Japanese intervention. This was used as propaganda by the Kuomintang, though Beiyang government leader Zhang Zuolin denied doing any such thing. Both the Beiyang government and the KMT government in Nanjing protested against the Japanese action, deeming it a violation of Chinese sovereignty.

As the NRA launched a pincer attack on Jinan, the railways to Qingdao and Beijing were damaged, preventing warlord-aligned troops from receiving reinforcements. This also brought the NRA in conflict with the Japanese, who were guarding the Qingdao–Jinan railway, though no violence broke out at this stage. On 29 April, chaos erupted as the warlord troops began to flee northwards across the Luokou Yellow River Railway Bridge, abandoning Jinan. As they left the city, the warlord forces were reported to have engaged in looting, though Japanese-inhabited areas continued to be protected by Japanese troops. Public dissatisfaction with the presence of the Imperial Japanese Army in Shandong became increasingly evident, their presence viewed as a new attempt by the Japanese to seize control of the region, as they had in 1914 during the First World War. NRA troops marched into Jinan over the course of 30 April and 1 May, and took control without trouble. On 2 May, Chiang Kai-shek began negotiations with the Japanese to withdraw their troops, gave assurances to Japanese Major General Ryū Saitō that there would be no disruption in Jinan, and ordered his troops to proceed northward from Jinan with haste, so as to avoid any potential conflict. Following the negotiations, Saitō decided to begin preparations to withdraw the Japanese troops, and said that all security matters in Jinan would then be entrusted to Chiang. General Fukuda later gave his approval to this decision, and the Japanese troops began withdrawal during the night of 2–3 May.

=== 3 May dispute between NRA and Japanese soldiers ===
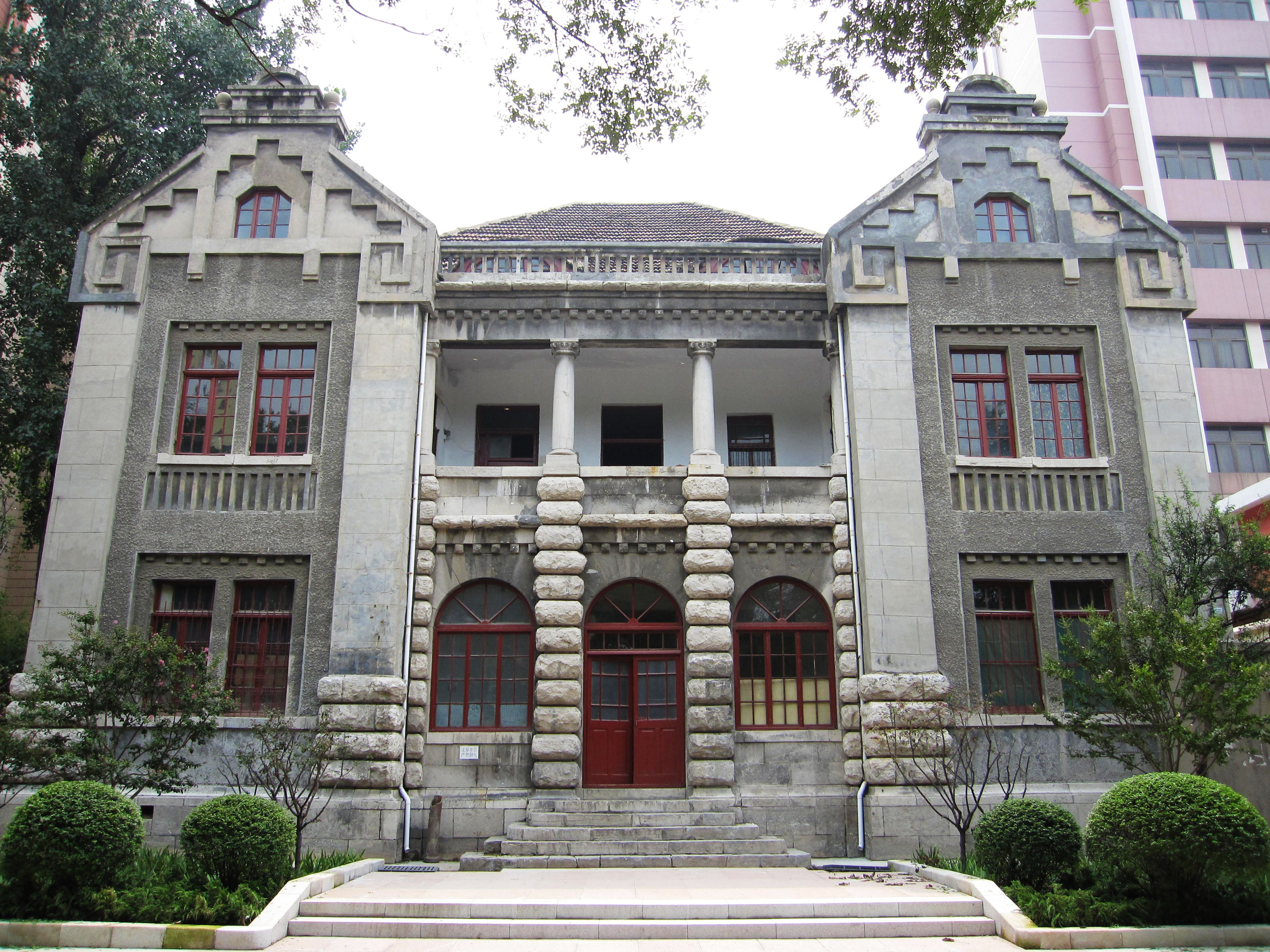
Former foreign office building in Jinan, site of the killing of Cai Gongshi

The area remained quiet, though tense, until a clash erupted between Japanese and NRA soldiers during the morning of 3 May. The exact details of what instigated the clash are contested between the Japanese and Chinese sides. As the Japanese immediately destroyed the Chinese wireless station after the clash began, they were left in control of the only working line of communication out of Jinan, forcing foreign media reports to rely entirely on the Japanese version of the events. According to the official Japanese narrative, as reported by General Fukuda, a group of Chinese soldiers under the command of General He Yaozu, reputed to have been responsible for the Nanjing incident, broke into an office of the Japanese Manshū Nippō newspaper, and assaulted its proprietor at 09:30. A group of Japanese soldiers commanded by Captain Yoshiharu Kumekawa patrolling in the area rushed to the scene, and attempted to stop the Chinese soldiers. The Chinese soldiers then opened fire on the Japanese troops, causing the Japanese to return fire. In the Chinese version of events, as recorded by Chiang Kai-shek, a sick Chinese soldier who had attempted to seek treatment at a local Christian hospital with the help of a local labourer was blocked from proceeding down the street to the hospital by Japanese soldiers, sparking a verbal argument. The Japanese then shot and killed the soldier and the labourer. Different Chinese sources, however, reported different versions of the events, and this gave the impression that the Chinese were inventing stories to justify their behaviour. The Japanese version, however, is marked by its own association with the later use of disinformation tactics by the Kwantung Army in the Huanggutun and Mukden incidents.

=== Initial fighting and truce ===
Regardless of who started the clash, it quickly resulted in a full-scale conflict between the NRA and the Japanese Army. The Japanese reported that NRA soldiers had "run amok", causing mass destruction and a massacre of Japanese civilians, and the British Acting Consul-General reported that he had seen the castrated corpses of Japanese males. In an incident that would provoke Chinese outrage, Japanese soldiers entered a building that the Chinese later said was their negotiation headquarters, and killed Chinese diplomat Cai Gongshi, eight members of his staff, seven NRA soldiers, and one cook. The exact nature of the killing is contested between the Japanese and Chinese sides, with the Japanese claiming they were attacked from the upper floors, and did not know that the building was a government office or that Cai held the position of negotiator. The Chinese, on the other hand, said that the building was clearly marked, and that Cai's nose, ears, and tongue were cut off, and his eyes gouged out, before he was executed. The other members of his staff were reported by the Chinese to have been stripped naked, whipped, dragged out to the back lawn and killed with machine guns. In response to these reports, Major General Ryū Saitō wrote that the Chinese account was "propaganda", that Cai was simply shot dead during ongoing fighting between the Japanese and Chinese, and that one cannot cut off ears or noses with a bayonet.

Negotiations to halt the escalating violence quickly began, with Chiang and Fukuda agreeing to a truce. Chiang, who was not interested in conflict with the Japanese, and wanted to continue the Northern Expedition, agreed to withdraw his troops from the city, leaving only a small number to keep order. On 4 May, however, the Japanese reported that their chief negotiator, Colonel Tōichi Sasaki, was robbed and nearly beaten to death, and only saved by intervention of one of Chiang's officers. In addition, they claimed that Chiang's promise to remove all Chinese soldiers from the Japanese-inhabited commercial area of the city had not been implemented. Speaking after the Sasaki incident, Major General Yoshitsugu Tatekawa said that it was "necessary for Japan to chastise the lawless Chinese soldiers in order to maintain Japan's national and military prestige". Responding to a request from General Fukuda, Prime Minister Tanaka ordered the despatch of reinforcements from Korea and Manchuria in the "Third Shandong Expedition" (第三山東出兵, Dai-san Santō Shuppei), which began arriving in Jinan on 7 May.

=== Japanese reprisal on Jinan ===
With his forces bolstered, General Fukuda issued a set of demands to the Chinese, to be met within twelve hours. These were: punishment of responsible Chinese officers, the disarming of responsible Chinese troops before the Japanese army, evacuation of two military barracks near Jinan, prohibition of all anti-Japanese propaganda, and withdrawal of all Chinese troops beyond 20 li on both sides of the Qingdao–Jinan railway. The Japanese knew that the Chinese would not be able to fulfil their demands within the stated timeframe. Instead, their issuance was designed to raise the morale of Japanese troops, cow the Chinese, and demonstrate the "determination" of the Japanese military to foreigners. As expected, the demands were viewed as humiliating and unacceptable by the Chinese. In response, Chiang, who had left the area, sent a courier to the Japanese garrison, stating that he would meet some, but not all of the stated demands. Fukuda, who deemed that his demands had not been met, launched a full-scale attack on the Chinese in Jinan in the afternoon of 8 May. Fighting was fiercest on the night of 9–10 May, with the Japanese using artillery to bombard the old walled city, where the remaining NRA troops had holed up. The civilian population of the old city were not warned in advance of the Japanese bombardment, which is thought to have resulted in many casualties. The final group of Chinese soldiers escaped under the cover of night on 10–11 May. By morning, the Japanese had gained full control of Jinan, and took up positions in the walled city. The city would remain under Japanese occupation until March 1929, when an agreement to settle the dispute over Jinan was reached. The period of occupation was defined by oppression, with freedom of the press and assembly proscribed, postal correspondence censored, and residents killed for alleged sympathies with the KMT.

== Aftermath ==
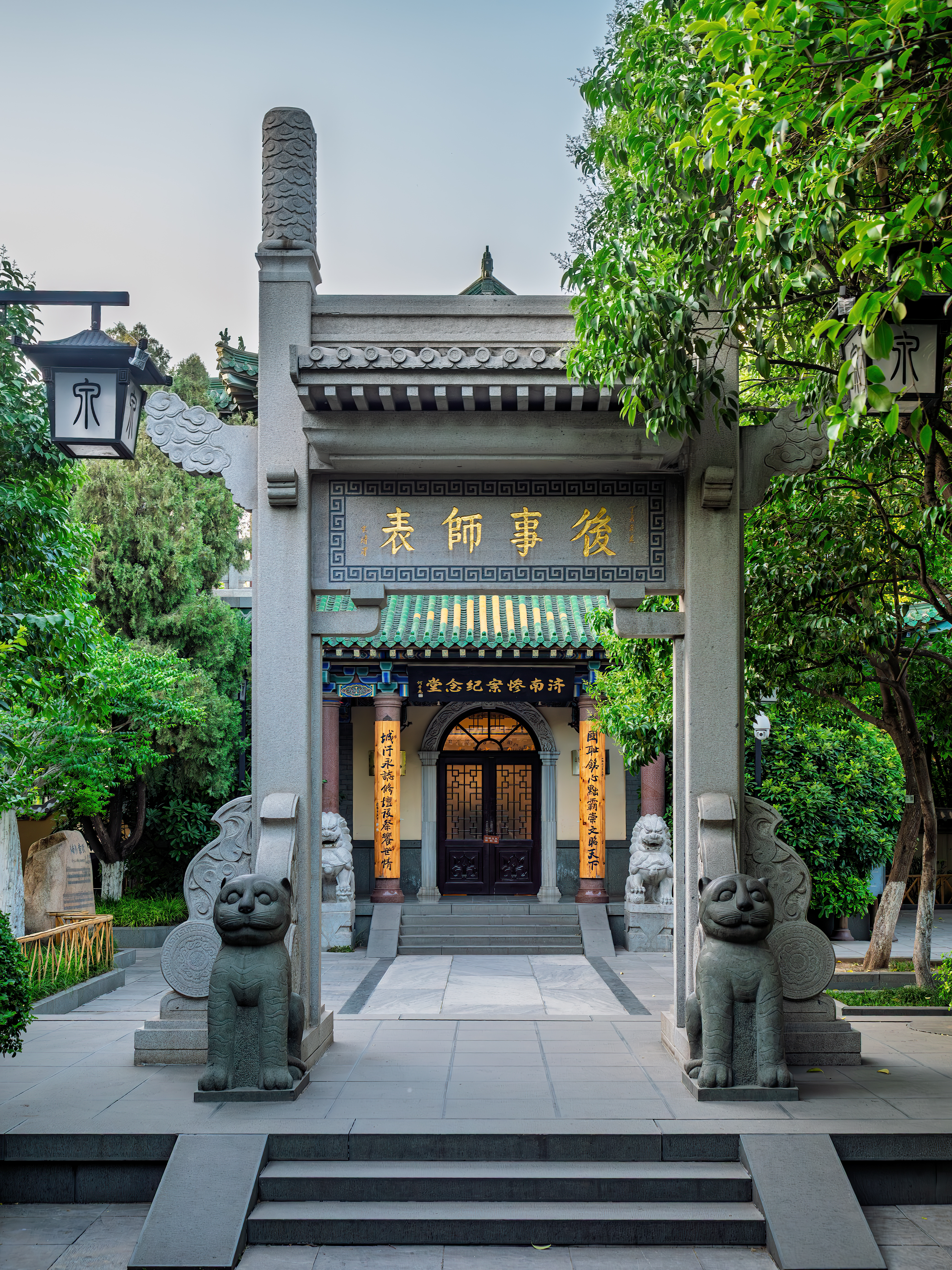
Jinan Tragedy Memorial Hall, Baotu Spring Park, Jinan

Chiang apologised to the Japanese on 10 May and removed He Yaozu from his post. After the incident, Chiang decided he would write one "way to kill the Japanese" each day in his journal, and also wrote that he now thought the Japanese were China's greatest enemy. Justifying his backing down from conflict in Jinan, he added that "before one can settle scores, one must be strong". When Chiang lectured a group of Chinese army cadets on the subject, he urged them to turn their energies to washing away the shame of Jinan, but to conceal their hatred until the last moment. Japanese prime minister Tanaka, who also had hoped to avoid conflict, opened negotiations with Chiang, and close to a year later, in March 1929, an agreement was reached to share responsibility for the Jinan incident, settle the dispute, and withdraw all Japanese troops from Shandong.

If the incident had been an isolated example of Japanese assertion and Chinese resistance, a broader understanding might have been reached. Chiang's troops, however, continued to expand their control in northern China and the Japanese army's distrust of the forces of Chinese nationalism would only grow. According to historian Akira Iriye, the Jinan incident demonstrated the weak nature of the Japanese chain of command, and the powerlessness of civilian government officials to stop unilateral aggression by the military. Japanese army leaders, increasingly outside civilian control, feared that Chiang would respond to patriotic agitation and threaten their interests in southern Manchuria. Following the precedent of General Fukuda's unilateral action in Jinan, a group of officers of the Kwantung Army assassinated the leader of the Beiyang government and ruler of Manchuria Zhang Zuolin on 4 June 1928, setting off a chain of events that created the pretext for the 1931 Japanese invasion of Manchuria.

Among Overseas Chinese, the Jinan incident sparked outrage and heightened anti-Japanese sentiment. In Siam, Thai Chinese organized a boycott which quickly halved Japanese imports into the country. Despite disapproving of this development, the Siamese government wished to avoid angering the Chinese business community and thus did not openly oppose the boycott. Yet the Siamese government did ban Sun Yat-sen's writings in an attempt to limit the continued spread of Chinese nationalism among its subjects.

== Misuse of photographs of victims ==
According to Japanese researcher Masayoshi Hara, pictures of the corpses of massacred Japanese citizens undergoing autopsy in a Jinan hospital have been used by Chinese publishers as photographs of the Japanese Unit 731 conducting biological weapons experiments on Chinese people. They have also appeared in the Jilin provincial museum, and in middle school textbooks. The same pictures have also been mistakenly used in Japan, such as in Kuriya Kentarō's book "The Road to the Tokyo Trials" (Tokyo Saiban e no michi) and in a TV Asahi programme about the horrors of war. Some of these pictures can be viewed below.

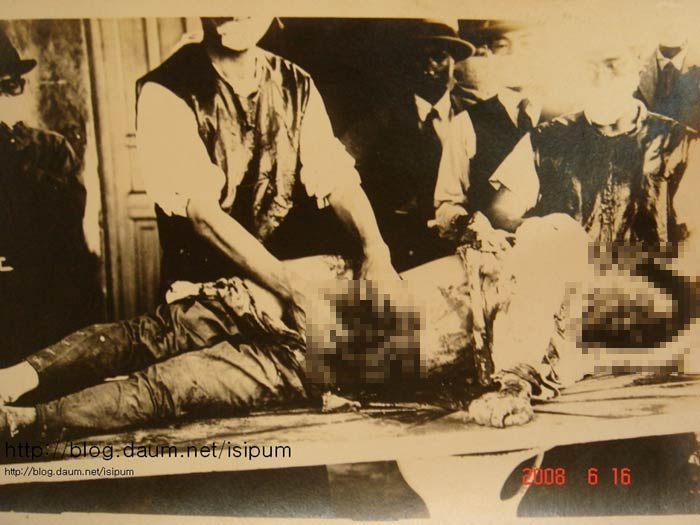

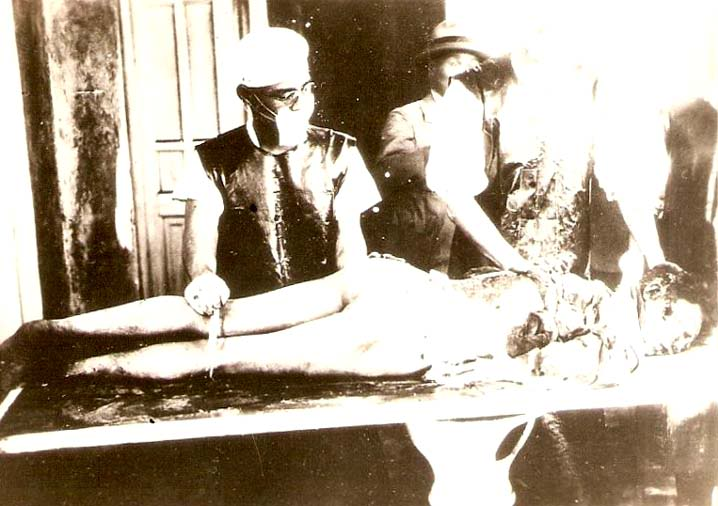

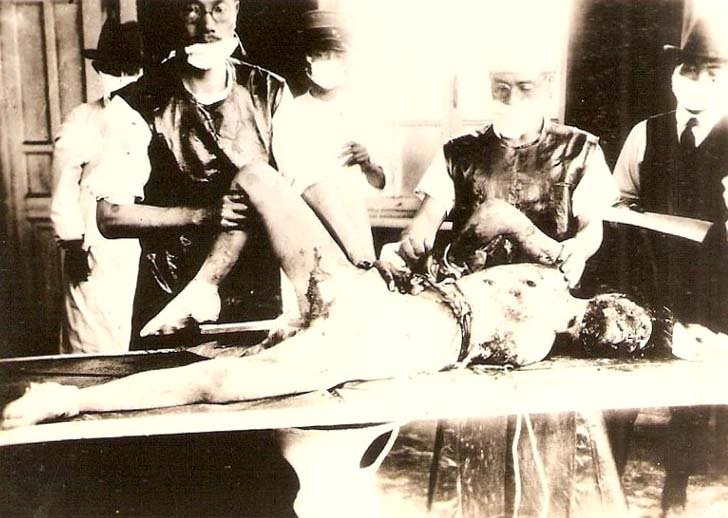

== See also ==
- Events preceding World War II in Asia
  - Huanggutun incident (Japanese assassination of the Chinese head of state Generalissimo Zhang Zuolin on 4 June 1928)
  - Northeast Flag Replacement (by Zhang Xueliang on 29 December 1928)
  - Japanese invasion of Manchuria
    - Mukden Incident (18 September 1931)
  - January 28 Incident (Shanghai, 1932)
  - Defense of the Great Wall (1933)
  - Marco Polo Bridge Incident (7 July 1937)
- Gando massacre
- Kantō Massacre
- Nanjing Massacre
- Nikolayevsk incident
- Tonghua incident
- Tongzhou mutiny
- Shakee Massacre
