= Reform faction (Japan) =

The Reform faction (革新派, Kakushin-ha) refers to a current of political thought, or the forces promoting it, that rose to prominence in the mainstream of the Empire of Japan after the Mukden Incident amid a surge of nationalism, statism and ultranationalism. It called for the "reform", "reconstruction" or "restoration" of the existing system, which was seen as stagnant and burdened by various distortions and contradictions.

It appeared as a military clique known as the "Reform faction" within the Imperial Japanese Army (associated with militarism), among civilian bureaucrats as the reform bureaucrats, and among those who were attracted to the Nazism of Nazi Germany.

One strand of this current was the Shōwa Restoration. It also gave rise to a series of assassinations and coup attempts, including the March Incident, October Incident, May 15 Incident, Military Academy Incident and February 26 Incident.

Domestically it formed the seed of later developments such as the National Mobilization Law, the Imperial Rule Assistance Association and the New Order Movement. A civilian gathering of reformist forces, the East Asia Construction National League (Tōa Kensetsu Kokumin Renmei), included figures such as Kenzo Adachi (National Alliance), Seigo Nakano (Tōhōkai), Iwane Matsui (Greater Asia Association), Kingoro Hashimoto (Great Japan Youth Party), Nobumasa Suetsugu, Sohō Tokutomi, Setsurei Miyake and Ichirō Kiyose.

Notable converts from the left include the following:

- Katsumaro Akamatsu – A socialist and social-democratic activist who served as secretary-general of the Social Masses Party from its foundation in 1926. He converted to national socialism, co-founded the Japan Socialist Institute in 1931 with right-wing activists including Juntarō Ishikawa and Tatsuo Tsukui (of the Dai-Nippon Seisantō), and was involved in the March and October Incidents. In 1932 he co-founded the Japan National Socialist Party with Rikizō Hirano and Shirō Koike (who had left the National Labour-Farmer Mass Party) and became its party affairs director. In 1937 he co-founded the Japan Reform Party with Genkurō Etō, Shunei Kan, Tatsuo Tsukui, Shirō Koike (of the Patriotic Political Alliance, the renamed Japan National Socialist Party) and Yasaburō Shimonaka (of the New Japan National Alliance) and again served as party affairs director.
- Rikizō Hirano – An independent leader of the peasant movement who helped found the Social Democratic Party in 1926 while also founding the Japan Farmers’ Party and becoming its secretary-general. In 1928 he became secretary-general of the Japan Masses Party after its merger with the Japan Labour-Farmer Party led by Hisashi Asō and others. In 1932 he co-founded the Japan National Socialist Party with Katsumaro Akamatsu. In 1933 he became a standing director of the Kōdōkai, which advocated cooperation between the Imperial Military Reservists’ Association and farmers.
- Hisashi Asō – Involved in the foundation of the Labour-Farmer Party and Japan Labour-Farmer Party in 1926; in 1928 helped form the Japan Masses Party through merger with the Japan Farmers’ Party of Rikizō Hirano and others, becoming its chairman in 1929. He later formed the National Masses Party (1930) and the National Labour-Farmer Mass Party (1931). In 1932 he became secretary-general of the newly founded Social Masses Party. In 1934 he issued a statement highly evaluating the Army Ministry pamphlet The Basic Principles of National Defense and Proposal for Strengthening It as an expression of the military’s socialist tendencies, strengthening his pro-military stance. On becoming chairman in 1940 he pushed the party toward totalitarianism together with Kan'ichirō Kamei, another pro-military national socialist. He actively cooperated with the New Order Movement promoted by the Second Konoe Cabinet, dissolved the party ahead of other parties, and became a member of the New Order Preparatory Committee.

In foreign policy the faction promoted a “New Order in East Asia” based on a Japan–Manchukuo–China economic bloc, seeking to link it with the “New Order in Europe” of Germany and Italy and to overturn the Anglo-American “old order” through a reorganisation of the world.

As a military clique the Reform faction later became the parent body of the Control Faction.
