= Yoshitsugu Tatekawa =

Imperial Japanese Army general

- 建川 美次
- Born: 3 October 1880; Niigata, Niigata Prefecture, Japan
- Died: 9 September 1945 (aged 64); Fuchū, Tokyo, Japan
- Education: Niigata Takada Junior High School; Imperial Japanese Army Academy
- Military career
- Allegiance: Empire of Japan
- Branch: Imperial Japanese Army
- Service years: 1901–1936
- Rank: Lieutenant General
- Units: 9th Rgt. Cavalry IJA; 1st Rgt. Cavalry IJA; 5th Rgt. Cavalry IJA
- Commands: 10th Division; 4th Division
- Conflicts: Russo-Japanese War; World War I (observer); Second Sino-Japanese War
- Other work: Military Attaché in China; Ambassador to the Soviet Union

Yoshitsugu Tatekawa (建川 美次, Tatekawa Yoshitsugu; 3 October 1880 – 9 September 1945) was a lieutenant-general in the Imperial Japanese Army in World War II. He played an important role in the Mukden incident in 1931 and as Japanese ambassador to the Soviet Union he negotiated the Soviet–Japanese Neutrality Pact in 1941.

== Early military career ==
Yoshitsugu Tatekawa, the third son of a local official, Nozaki Yoshitaka, in Niigata city, was later adopted by another local official, Tatekawa Shuhei, whose surname he took. He went to Niigata Takada Junior High School and graduated from the 13th class of the Imperial Japanese Army Academy, specializing in cavalry. He served as a lieutenant in the Russo-Japanese War, where in January 1905, by direct order of Field Marshal Ōyama Iwao, he led a five-man cavalry squadron on a 23-day 1200 km reconnaissance mission far behind enemy lines in Manchuria. The intelligence gathered was mentioned in dispatches by General Oku Yasukata with proving invaluable intelligence leading to the Japanese victory at the Battle of Mukden. His exploits were later publicized in a number of novels and in a serialized story for the Shōnen Club youth magazine, and a fictionalized version became a movie.

After the war, he graduated from the 21st class of the Army Staff College in 1909 and worked at various administrative posts within the Imperial Japanese Army General Staff. He was sent as a military attaché to the United Kingdom in November 1911 and to British India in July 1913. he returned to Japan briefly in January 1916, was promoted to major in May, and was sent back to Europe in August as a military observer embedded with the Royal Army on the front lines during World War I. He returned to Japan in March 1918, and was private secretary to Army Minister Ōshima Ken'ichi from July 1918 to July 1919, when was promoted to lieutenant colonel. Tatekawa was assigned as the official Imperial Japanese Army representative to the Japanese delegation at the League of Nations between July 1920 and December 1922.

After his return to Japan, Tatekawa was assigned command of the IJA 1st Cavalry Regiment in December 1922 and of the IJA 5th Cavalry Regiment from March 1923. He was promoted to colonel in August 1923. In December 1924, he was made head of the 2nd Bureau, 4th Department (European and American Intelligence Service) of the General Staff. Politically, he was noted for his close ties to General Ugaki Kazushige.

== As general ==
In March 1928, Tatekawa was promoted to major general and became the military liaison to the Embassy of Japan in Beijing. He was appointed head of the Second Bureau (Intelligence) of the General Staff in August 1929, where he was in position to provide information and assistance to plotters of the March incident, who aimed at making Ugaki prime minister. After Tatekawa was transferred to the First Bureau (Operations) in August 1931, he provided information and aid to Kingoro Hashimoto and Isamu Chō in the abortive coup d'état known as the October incident.

Tatekawa was dispatched by Army Minister Jirō Minami to Manchuria for the specific purpose of curbing the insubordination and militarist behavior of the Kwantung Army. There was a growing concern by both military and civilian leaders in Tokyo that the Kwantung Army would take unauthorized action to provoke an incident leading to war with China. Tatekawa was sent with a letter from Minami to the commander of the Kwantung Army, Lieutenant General Shigeru Honjō, together with a second letter written by General Kanaya Hanzo, the head of the Army General Staff. The Kwantung Army was forewarned of the visit by a message from Tatekawa's assistant, Colonel Kingoro Hashimoto. On arrival, instead of reprimanding the Kwantung Army leaders for their insubordination, Tatekawa said that everything could wait "until tomorrow" and spent his time in a ryōtei until he passed out from a drink. That same night, the Mukden incident occurred, which provided the pretext for the Japanese invasion of Manchuria. From Tatekawa's peculiar behavior the previous night, it can be surmised that he had been aware of and supported the plot and taken the deliberate decision not to prevent it.

Tatekawa as commander of the IJA 10th Division

In December 1931, Tatekawa was on the Japanese delegation to the Geneva Disarmament Conference and from July 1932 was the Japanese permanent representative to the League of Nations in Geneva until Japan officially withdrew from the League in March 1933. He was promoted to lieutenant general in August 1932. In March 1933, he was made commander of the IJA 10th Division. He was transferred to command the IJA 4th Division in December 1935.

His military career ended when he was forced to resign from military service in the purge of Kōdōha officers after the February 26 incident.

== Diplomatic career ==
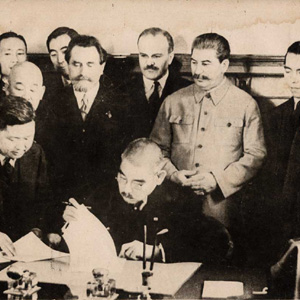
Signing of the Soviet-Japanese Neutrality Pact

In September 1940, Tatekawa was appointed as ambassador to the Soviet Union. He played a crucial role during the negotiations of the Soviet–Japanese Neutrality Pact, which was signed in Moscow on 13 April 1941. The signing of the treaty occurred on two years after the Soviet-Japan War, and was of vital concern for proponents of the Nanshin-ron, the doctrime for southern expansion, within the Japanese government and military, as it enabled more troops to be deployed for the Japanese invasion of Southeast Asia.

On the same day, Tatekawa signed a separate treaty in which the Soviet Union pledged to respect the territorial integrity and inviolability of Manchukuo, and Japan pledged the same to respect the Soviet hegemony over the People's Republic of Mongolia.

Tatekawa, against orders from the central government, issued visas to many Jews who would likely have been killed during the Holocaust.

He remained ambassador until March 1942, when he had to return to Japan because of health problems. After his return, he served as an official in the Imperial Rule Assistance Association political party and as the head of the Yokusan Sonendan paramilitary youth organization from August 1944. He died on 9 September 1945, and was buried at the Tama Cemetery in Fuchū, Tokyo.

== In popular media ==
=== Literature ===
The actions and courage of Yoshitsugu Tatekawa in his reconnaissance patrols during the Russo-Japanese War were immortalized in a very popular children's book titled Tekichi Odan Sambyaku-ri (敵地横断３００り, Three Hundred Miles Behind Enemy Lines), written by Yamanaka Minetaro (1885-1966) in 1931. It was published in 1936 in the children's magazine Shōnen Club (少年クラブ), published by Kodansha.

=== Film ===
The novel written by Yamanaka Minetaro on Tatekawa's exploits in the Russo-Japanese War was later turned into a movie. In 1941, Akira Kurosawa wrote the script for the movie Tekichi Odan Sambyaku-ri ("Advance Patrol"). The movie went into production in 1957 and was directed by Kazuo Mori. The story takes place in Manchuria in 1905, where Lieutenant Tatekawa together with five soldiers are sent on a reconnaissance mission behind the Russian lines to gather information about their plans. The six find what they seek, but the most difficult part of their mission is to return safely.

=== Anime ===
Night Raid 1931 ('閃光のナイトレイド) is a 13-episode Japanese anime, which is set in Shanghai and Manchuria in 1931. Episode 7 specifically talks about the Mukden Incident. The anime was broadcast on TV Tokyo starting from 5 April 2010. It was directed by Matsumoto Jun. The anime was released by Sentai Filmworks on Blu-Ray and DVD in August 2011. Because of the political controversy surrounding the Mukden Incident, Episode 7 titled "Jihen" (事変 - The Incident) was available to watch only via online streaming. It shows the incidents leading up to the Mukden Incident from the point of view of the Japanese officers of the Kwantung Army stationed in Manchuria and the intervention of Yoshitsugu Tatekawa in the incident. In the episode, it is shown how the Japanese officers planned the bombardment so that Japan could cklaim to have attacked Manchuria out of self-defense.

Tatekawa is voiced by Takaya Hashi in Japanese and by Rob Mungle in English.

== Timeline ==
=== Military ranks ===
Date	Officer Ranks
23/06/1902	Second Lieutenant
22/11/1904	Lieutenant
19/06/1909	Captain
02/05/1916	Major
25/07/1919	Lieutenant Colonel
06/08/1923	Colonel
08/03/1928	Major General
08/08/1932	Lieutenant General

=== Professional career ===
Date	Event
22/11/1901	graduated from the 13th class of the Imperial Japanese Army Academy (Rikugun Shikan Gakko)
23/06/1902–11/12/1905	Lieutenant, 9th Cavalry Regiment IJA
11/12/1905–03/12/1906	Instructor, Cavalry School
03/12/1909	graduated from the 21st class of the Army War College (Rikugun Daigakko)
03/12/1906–10/12/1909	Lieutenant and later Captain, 9th Cavalry Regiment IJA
10/12/1909–08/1911	attached to the General Staff of the IJA
08/1911–01/07/1913	stationed in the United Kingdom
15/02/1915–24/07/1918	attached to the General Staff of the IJA
15/02/1915–21/01/1916	Military Science Instructor at the Army War College
21/01/1916–24/07/1918	Military Observer to Europe
24/07/1918–16/07/1920	Secretary of Army Minister, general Tanaka Giichi
13/09/1920–09/12/1922	Member of the Japanese Military Delegation to the League of Nations
09/12/1922–17/03/1923	Cavalry Officer, 1st Cavalry Regiment IJA
17/03/1923–15/12/1924	Commanding Officer, 5th Cavalry Regiment IJA
15/12/1924–08/03/1928	Head of the 2nd Bureau, 4th Section (European and American Intelligence) at the General Staff Office IJA
23/01/1925–08/03/1928	Military Science Instructor at the Army War College
08/03/1928–01/08/1929	Military Attaché in China
01/08/1929–01/08/1931	Head of the 2nd Bureau (Intelligence) at the General Staff Office IJA
01/08/1931–05/02/1932	Head of the 1st Bureau at the General Staff Office IJA
05/02/1932–05/07/1932	Member of the Japanese Military Delegation in Geneva (Switzerland) at the World Disarmament Conference
05/02/1932–27/03/1933	Permanent Representative of the Japanese Army to the League of Nations
18/03/1933–02/12/1935	Commander of the 10th Division IJA
02/12/1935–01/08/1936	Commander of the 4th Division IJA
01/08/1936	reserve – forced to retire from military service for involvement in the February 26 incident of 1936
14/09/1940–03/1942	Ambassador to the Soviet Union

== Decorations ==
Date	Award
1/4/1906	Order of the Golden Kite, 4th Class
1/11/1920	Order of the Rising Sun Gold Rays with Neck Ribbon, 3rd Class
1/11/1930	Order of the Sacred Treasure, 2nd Class
29/4/1934	Grand Cordon of the Order of the Rising Sun, 1st Class

Preceded by Shigenori Tōgō	Ambassador of Japan to the Soviet Union; 1940–1942	Succeeded by Naotake Satō
