= Hiroshi Nemoto =

Japanese lieutenant general

- 根本 博
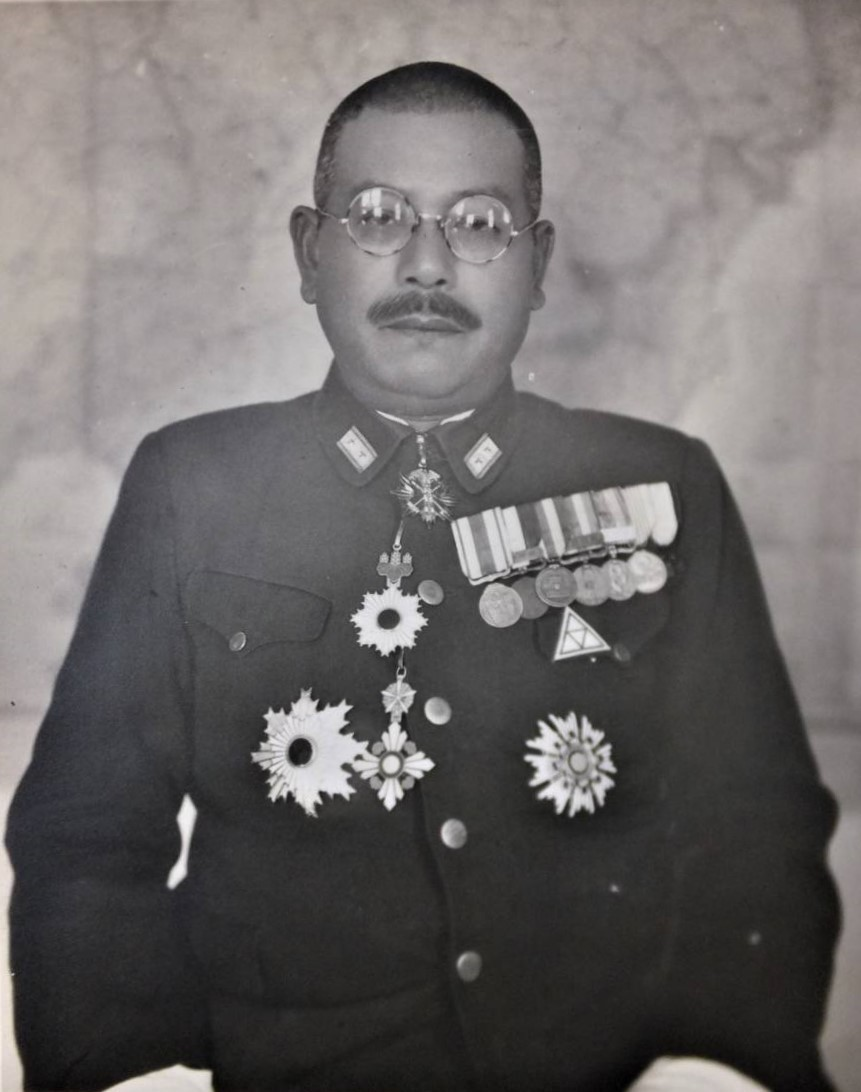
- Born: June 6, 1891; Niida, Fukushima, Japan
- Died: May 24, 1966 (aged 74); Machida, Tokyo, Japan
- Education: Imperial Japanese Army Academy; Army War College
- Military career
- Allegiance: Empire of Japan; Republic of China
- Branch: Imperial Japanese Army
- Rank: Lieutenant General
- Commands: Mongolia Garrison Army; 3rd Army
- Conflicts: Second Sino-Japanese War; Soviet–Japanese War; Chinese Civil War; Battle of Guningtou
- Awards: Order of the Sacred Treasure, 1st class Order of the Golden Kite, 3rd class

Hiroshi Nemoto (根本 博, Nemoto Hiroshi; June 6, 1891 – May 24, 1966) was a lieutenant general for Japan who served in the Second World War and the Battle of Guningtou. Born in Fukushima Prefecture, he served in the Imperial Japanese Army. He was awarded the Order of the Golden Kite (3rd Class).

When Japan surrendered in World War II, he served as the commanding officer of the garrison in Mengjiang (modern-day Inner Mongolia). Under the attack of the Soviet Army, he still resisted, protecting 40,000 Japanese nationals stranded near Zhangjiakou in Inner Mongolia.

In 1949 he secretly sailed to Taiwan and served as a personal adviser to Tang Enbo. He assisted in directing the Kinmen campaign in Kinmen and Xiamen. In the end, the Republic of China Armed Forces successfully defeated the People's Liberation Army.

== Biography ==
=== Birth and Education ===
He was born in the village of Niida, Iwase district, Fukushima (nowadays part of Sukagawa). Born in a farming family, his father worked in the village government. His brother was a counselor in his village council. In 1904, he entered the Sendai Army Youth Academy, and graduated at the Imperial Japanese Army Academy 7 years later, ranked 13th among 509 students. In 1922, he graduated at the Army War College, ranked 9th among 60.

=== As a field officer ===
Upon graduation in the Army War College, he served in the Imperial Japanese Army, specializing in Chinese affairs. During the Nanjing Incident of 1927, he stationed at the consulate-general of Japan in Nanjing where he was attacked by the soldiers of the Northern Expedition and even injured by a bayonet. In order to escape, he jumped off from the second floor and was severely injured. He was rescued in time and survived.

After the Huanggutun incident took place in June 1928, he began to specialize in solving the Manchuria-Mongolia problem, conducting research and proposing plans for the nation. Later, he joined a group led by Kanji Ishiwara, Teiichi Suzuki, Keisaku Murakami, Akira Mutō and composing mainly of youth officers. In May 1929, the group aimed at military reform and personnel refreshment, separation of commanding power from state affairs, and establishment of a legitimate national general mobilization system.

In August 1930, Nemoto was promoted to lieutenant colonel and became the leader of the Shina section.

In September 1930, he joined the secret association Sakurakai, which aimed at reforming Japan. In March 1931, he was involved in the March and October Incidents, being punished and ignored as a result.
Before the February 26 incident occurred in 1936, he was the news leader in the Ground Army of Imperial Japan. He intended to take part in the event, but he was drunk in the previous night and hence did not take part.

After the reform of the ground forces, he returned to his original group and became to group leader. When the second Sino-Japanese war took place, he returned to his initial job of specializing in China affairs. Until Japan had surrendered, he had held various titles, including (but not limited to) the Chief of Staff and Commander.

=== As Commander in Mongolia ===
Nemoto was appointed commander of the army in Mongolia in November 1944. In August 1945, the Soviet–Japanese War broke out, and the Soviet army began to invade Manchuria. After the Japanese surrender on the 15th of the month, the Soviet Red Army showed no sign of ceasing the attack. In order to protect the 40,000 Japanese immigrants stranded in the area, he issued this order to the Japanese defense team:

Regardless of reason, the Soviet forces that invade us will be killed, and all responsibility for this will be borne by me, the commander.

— Nemoto Hiroshi

During the desperate guarding of the trains and routes used by civilians, several attempts were made to negotiate a ceasefire with the Soviets. Under the non-stop attack of the Soviet army, he carried out a close-range combat. After the Eighth Route Army of the Chinese Communist Party also came to help the Soviets, Nemoto fought more vigorously to block the attacks.

On August 19, Nemoto fought a three-day battle with the Soviet army. The Japanese army fought back under the command of Nemoto, and the Soviet army lost its fighting spirit. Therefore, the Japanese army began to retreat on August 21, and the last team returned to within the Great Wall on August 27. The Chief of Staff of the Mongolian Army who came to greet him was in tears, and thanked Nemoto for saving 40,000 Japanese civilians he could not have saved. On the other hand, the 40,000 civilians who fled from Inner Mongolia on August 20 arrived in Tianjin after a three-day trek, and boarded a ship to return to Japan.

In August 1946, as the top person in charge, after the return of the Japanese who were stranded in China and the demobilization of 350,000 soldiers from the North China Army, Nemoto finally returned to Japan.

=== Taiwan ===
==== Secret transport ====
After demobilization, he returned to his home in Tsurukawa, Tokyo. As Kuomintang would lose control over China, after Chiang Kai-shek resigned as president in January 1949, he pawned some goods and sold some of his belongings as a ferry fee for Chiang. Under the support of others, he set sail for Taiwan. A shipwreck occurred on the way, but Nemoto was rescued by the US military. The US military provided some money and sent a Japanese-born American officer to accompany.

On 26 June 1949 of the same year, they sailed to Taiwan from the coast of Nobeoka, Miyazaki Prefecture. Arriving in Keelung on July 10, the local gendarmerie and police officers were unaware of the situation, so the people who sailed on the ship were imprisoned. Later, after the report of Nemoto's imprisonment was transmitted to the upper ranks of the National Army (Lieutenant General Peng Mengqi and Lieutenant General Niu Xianming), their treatment was immediately changed. They were moved to Beitou Hot Springs in Taipei to rest on August 1. In mid-August, Tang Enbo coordinated and met with Chiang. On August 5 of the same year, the United States Government indicated to the Kuomintang that military assistance would be suspended, and Chiang Kai-shek accepted the assistance of Nemoto and others.

Some sources indicate that Nemoto's cause of moving to Taiwan included not only gratefulness towards Chiang, but also a will to show off his talents.

==== Battle at Kinmen ====
Nemoto was transferred from Taiwan to Xiamen on August 18, under the pseudonym "Lin Baoyuan" ("Yuan", meaning "the root") and was appointed Lieutenant General. Tang Enbo treated him with courtesy, and called him "Consultant of the Advisor" in Japanese. Due to the successive defeats of the Kuomintang army in the battlefields of mainland China, Nemoto suggested to Tang that the army retreat to the Zhoushan Islands, Yijiangshan, Dachen Island, Kinmen and Matsu Islands, stretch the front line with the Communist army, protect Taiwan and Penghu Islands, and wait for the opportunity to counterattack. The plan obtained the affirmation of Chiang. On October 1, 1949, the Chinese Communist Party established the People's Republic of China. Soon, Xiamen fell out of Kuomintang's control, and the Kuomintang army had to fight on Kinmen Island, and Nemoto also set out to plan a trench battle. From On the following October 24, Nemoto assisted in commanding the Battle of Guningtou on Kinmen Island, using tanks to shoot PLA vessels to cut off the PLA's retreat, annihilating the incoming Chinese People's Liberation Army. He successfully defended Kinmen, and claimed to have been dubbed "God of War".

After the victory at Kinmen, he participated in the education and training activities of the Kuomintang Army. The day before Nemoto left Taiwan in 1952, in order to express his gratitude, Chiang opened a pair of special vases he had collected and presented one of them to Nemoto. The vases originally consisted of six (three pairs). They were specially made for Chiang in Jingdezhen, Jiangxi in 1947. One of them was given to Queen Elizabeth II of England as a wedding gift, and another was given to the Emperor Showa of Japan, leaving himself just one pair.

==== Media coverage ====
At that time, the general convener of the Kuomintang and the Paidan in Japan, Yasuji Okamura, considered recruiting the Japanese army to defend against the attack of the People's Republic of China again. Later, it was widely reported by the international media under the name "Taiwan Recruitment Issue", which aroused the attention of the Allied Command in Japan and was aborted. Japan's secret ferry to Taiwan was also questioned by the Japanese parliament. At the time, the prime minister of Japan, Shigeru Yoshida, was ambiguous when he answered questions in the parliament. Because of the incident, the Paidan was dissatisfied with Nemoto, so Nemoto was not allowed to join.

=== Later years ===
On June 25, 1952, he returned to Japan on a flight by the Civil Air Transport (CAT). He was punished without prosecution for the incident of the secret sail three years ago. Later, he lived in his home in Tsurukawa. On May 5, 1966, after the first holiday when his grandson was born, he was admitted to the hospital because his health deteriorated. He was discharged from hospital on the 21st of the same month, but died suddenly on the 24th, at the age of 74.

=== After death ===
Because Hiroshi Nemoto was neither part of the Republic of China Armed Forces' order of battle nor a member of the armed forces, he operated under an assumed name and wore Republic of China military uniforms to conceal his identity. Nevertheless, there were limitations on documenting his activities. In addition, some ROC military commanders at the time had reservations about Tang Enbo's military operations. As a result, relatively few archival records and historical sources concerning Nemoto have survived, particularly regarding the Battle of Guningtou. Most of the available literature is based on Nemoto's own memoirs.

=== 60th anniversary of the Battle of Guningtou ===
At the memorial service for the dead in the Battle of Guningtou held in October 2009, several Japanese military members and advisory families were invited by the Republic of China government and met with President Ma Ying-jeou of the Republic of China.

In addition, before their return to Japan, Lieutenant General Huang Yibing, the Deputy Secretary of Defense of the Republic of China, stated in front of the media as "the representative of the Ministry of National Defense" said: "In the Battle of Guningtou in the past, we thank the Japanese friends for their assistance." By then, the government of the Republic of China finally officially announced the participation of the Japanese in the Battle of Guningtou.

== See also ==
- Battle of Guningtou
- Second Taiwan Strait Crisis
