= Kan'ichirō Kamei =

Japanese diplomat and politician (1892–1987)

- 亀井貫一郎
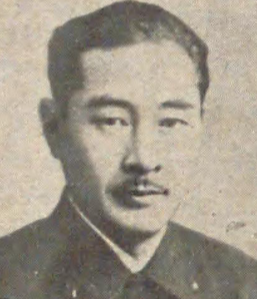
- Kan'ichirō Kamei

Member of the House of Representatives
- Incumbent
- Assumed office 1928
- Constituency: Fukuoka 2nd

Personal details
- Born: November 10, 1892 Tokyo, Japan
- Died: April 7, 1987 (aged 94)
- Party: Social Democratic Party; Imperial Rule Assistance Association
- Education: Tokyo Imperial University
- Occupation: Diplomat, politician

Kan'ichirō Kamei (亀井 貫一郎, Kamei Kan'ichirō; 10 November 1892 – 7 April 1987) was a Japanese diplomat and politician. He was a member of the House of Representatives affiliated with the Social Democratic Party and the Imperial Rule Assistance Association. He also served as chairman of the foundation Seisen Gijutsu Kyōkai (聖戦技術協会; Holy War Technology Association).

== Biography ==
Kamei was born in Tokyo as the eldest son of Kamei Koreyuki (亀井茲迪). His younger brother was Yoshio Kamei (亀井凱夫), a rear admiral in the Imperial Japanese Navy who was killed in action. His father Koreyuki was born as the third son of Hosokawa Okitsura (細川興貫), the 9th lord of the Yatabe Domain, and was adopted into a branch of the Kamei count family (of the former Tsuwano Domain), which he succeeded.

He attended the elementary and middle schools attached to Tokyo Higher Normal School (now the University of Tsukuba), followed by the First Higher School, before entering Tokyo Imperial University. In July 1917, he graduated from the Faculty of Law (Department of Political Science) of Tokyo Imperial University. In October of the same year, he passed the diplomatic and consular service examination and entered the Ministry of Foreign Affairs. After serving as a foreign affairs official in the General Affairs Section of the Commercial Bureau, he took a temporary leave of absence and until October 1923 served as a special advisor to the Minister of the Army and the Minister of the Navy. He later returned to the Foreign Ministry and resigned in December 1924.

In the 1928 general election, he was first elected to the House of Representatives from Fukuoka 2nd district as a candidate of the Social Democratic Party. He served a total of four terms, interrupted by one defeat.

Although a member of a proletarian party, through acquaintances from his diplomatic career he became close to military officers advocating national reform, such as those in the Sakurakai (Cherry Blossom Society). In the 1931 March Incident and October Incident, he participated in plans, together with Katsumaro Akamatsu, to mobilize labor unions in support of the coup attempts.

He was involved, along with Teisuke Akiyama and Hisashi Asō, in the New Order Movement promoted by Fumimaro Konoe. After the establishment of the Imperial Rule Assistance Association, he served as a director and head of the East Asia Section of the Planning Bureau (November 1940 – April 1941). However, he was arrested for violation of the Military Secrets Protection Law and in December 1942 was sentenced to eight months' imprisonment with a one-year suspended sentence. In May 1943, upon the establishment of the foundation Seisen Gijutsu Kyōkai (predecessor of the Sangyō Keizai Kenkyū Kyōkai), he became its chairman.

After the war, he was purged from public office. He was also summoned as a witness before the House of Representatives Special Committee on Investigation of Improper Property Transactions. In addition, he was involved in the "military uniform incident," in which he approached more than thirty organizations, including the West Kanbara branch of the Niigata Prefecture Agricultural Association, with offers of surplus military uniforms and defrauded them of approximately 15 million yen, for which he received a sentence of three years' imprisonment with a four-year suspended sentence. On the other hand, through connections from the Seisen Gijutsu Kyōkai, he was involved in efforts to secure immunity for personnel associated with Unit 731. When locomotive engineers dissatisfied with the policies of the National Railway Workers' Union sought to secede and form the National Railway Locomotive Workers' Union (later the National Railway Motive Power Workers' Union), he advised them on dealings with GHQ and the Central Labor Relations Commission.

After his purge was lifted in August 1951, he ran unsuccessfully in the 1953 general election (Ibaraki 1st district, Independent Socialist Party) and the 1955 general election (Kanagawa 3rd district, Right-wing Socialist Party), and was unable to return to politics.

He died in April 1987.

== See also ==
- Mori Ōgai
- Tetsuzan Nagata
- Shirō Ishii
- Hideoto Mōri (brother-in-law, husband of his younger sister)
