= Kingoro Hashimoto =

Japanese officer and politician, war criminal (1890–1957)

Kingorō Hashimoto
- 橋本 欣五郎

Member of the House of Representatives
- In office 30 April 1942 – 1 December 1945
- Preceded by: Multi-member district
- Succeeded by: Constituency abolished
- Constituency: Fukuoka 4th

Personal details
- Born: 19 February 1890 Okayama City, Okayama, Japan
- Died: 29 June 1957 (aged 67) Tokyo, Japan
- Party: Imperial Rule Assistance Association

Military service
- Allegiance: Empire of Japan
- Branch/service: Imperial Japanese Army
- Years of service: 1911–1936; 1937–1939
- Rank: Colonel

Kingorō Hashimoto (橋本 欣五郎, Hashimoto Kingorō; 19 February 1890 – 29 June 1957) was an officer in the Imperial Japanese Army and politician. He was famous for having twice tried to stage a coup against the civilian government in the 1930s.

== Early life and career ==
Hashimoto was born on 19 February 1890 in Okayama Prefecture to the family of a minor ship owner. The family moved to Moji in Fukuoka Prefecture when he was seven. Hashimoto graduated from the 23rd class of the Imperial Japanese Army Academy in 1911. He subsequently graduated from the Army Staff College in 1920 as a captain. Hashimoto had learned Russian as a cadet and was assigned to the Russia Section of the General Staff.

In April 1922, he was assigned to the Kwantung Army in Manchuria and was stationed at Harbin Special Service Organisation (特務機関, tokumu kikan). During his time in Manchuria he befriended the ultranationalist Shūmei Ōkawa, who then worked for the South Manchuria Railway. In 1923, he was sent on special assignment to Manzhouli, near the border with the Soviet Union. From September 1927 through June 1930, he served as military attaché to Turkey. On his return to Japan, he was promoted to lieutenant colonel and chief of the Russia section.

== Coup attempts ==
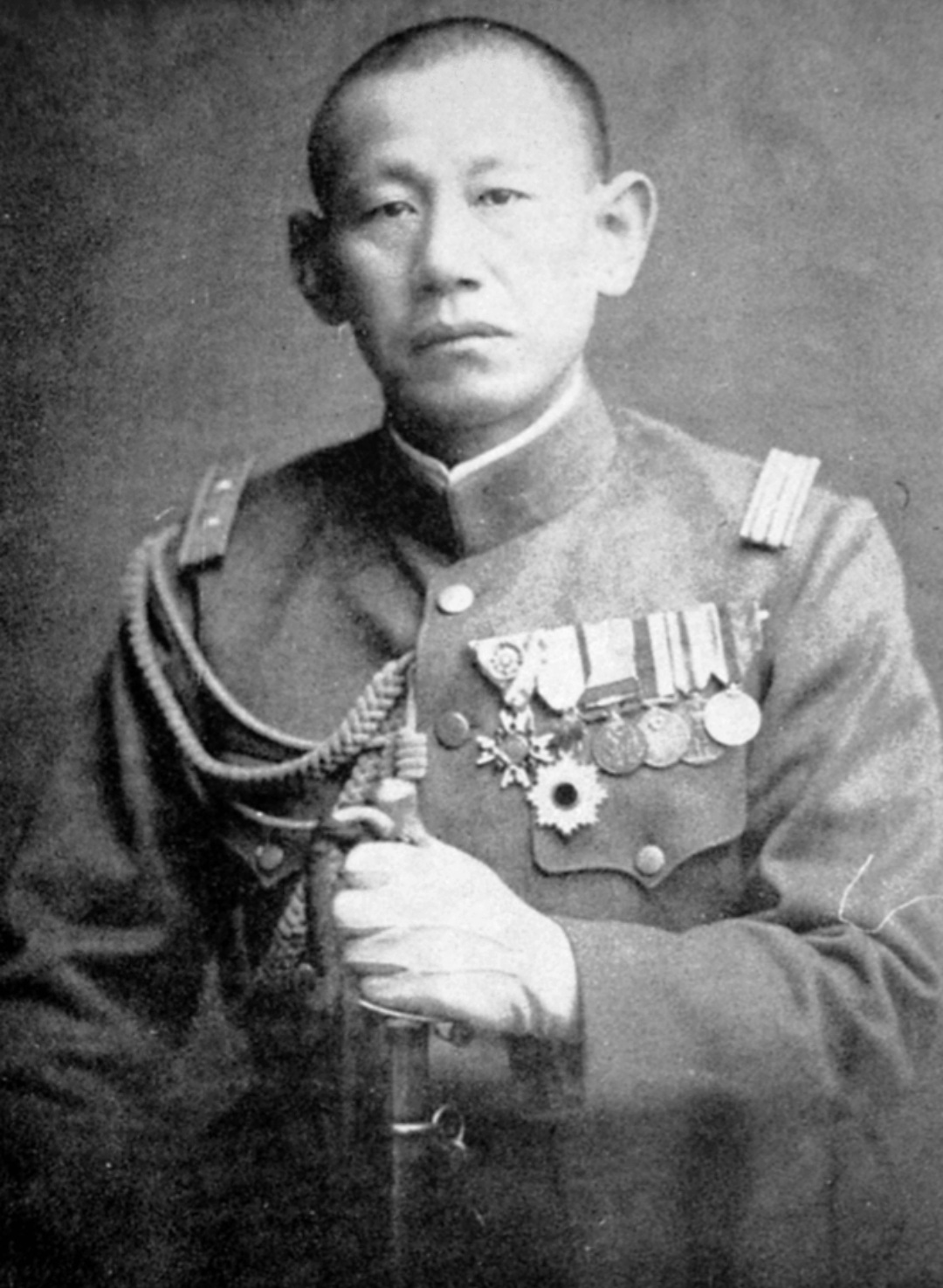
Colonel Hashimoto (1931)

From the middle of 1930, Hashimoto became increasingly involved in radical politics within the military, with active participation in various attempts at a coup d'état. The Sakurakai (Cherry Blossom Society) was formed by him and Captain Isamu Chō. Hashimoto was also a member of the Black Dragon Society.

Hashimoto actively participated in the March incident of 1931. It sought political reform with the elimination of party government by a coup d'état and the establishment of a new cabinet under General Kazushige Ugaki to stamp out Japan's allegedly-corrupt politics.

The attempt failed, but Hashimoto, along with Isamu Chō and Shūmei Ōkawa, organized a further coup, the Imperial Colors Incident, also known as the October Incident. All the conspirators were arrested and transferred to other posts.

During the February 26 incident, Hashimoto attempted to mediate with the rebels. Late that light, he met with at the Imperial Hotel with Colonel Kanji Ishiwara from Martial Law Headquarters and Colonel Sakichi Mitsui, representing the rebels, to discuss a resolution. For the next prime minister, Hashimoto proposed Lt. General Yoshitsugu Tatekawa, but the three ultimately agreed on Admiral Eisuke Yamamoto. Neither the rebels or the army agreed to this plan.

== Later activities ==
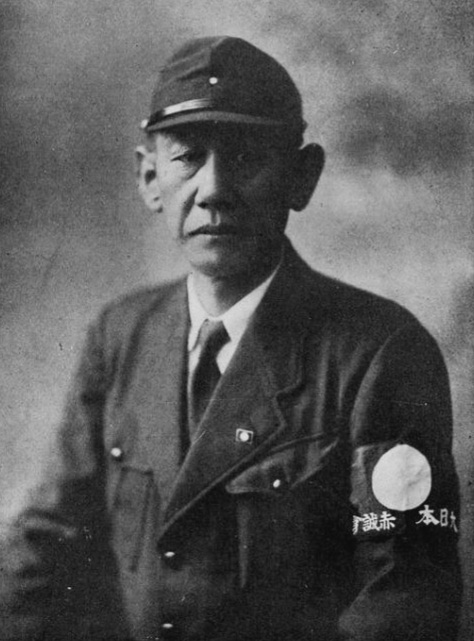
Hashimoto in the uniform of the Great Japan Youth Party, 1937

After leaving active service, Hashimoto formed the Great Japan Youth Party in October 1936.

Hashimoto returned to active service after the outbreak of the Second Sino-Japanese War in 1937. He was involved in the Panay incident of 12 December 1937 in which unprovoked Japanese bombers attacked and sank the USS Panay (PR-5) on the Yangtze River in China. Hashimoto was the senior Japanese officer in the region, and a few days after the sinking, he was quoted in US newspapers as saying "I had orders to fire." US-Japanese relations continued to sour in the aftermath of the incident, which would eventually lead to the Pacific War.

Hashimoto supported aggressive policies during the Second Sino-Japanese War and the Tripartite Pact with Nazi Germany and Fascist Italy in 1940, along with the other military extremists of the Imperial Japanese Army.

As a prominent nationalist, Hashimoto was invited to participate in the formation of the Imperial Rule Assistance Association by Prime Minister Fumimaro Konoe in October 1940. Hashimoto served as a standing director.

Hashimoto was elected to the House of Representatives in 1942 and was a member of the Imperial Rule Assistance Political Association. After Kuniaki Koiso became prime minister, Hashimoto's old superior Yoshitsugu Tatekawa was made commander of the Yokusan Sonendan and Hashimoto became his deputy and director of the central headquarters in August 1944. He held that position until February 1945.

With the dissolution of the Imperial Rule Assistance Political Association in March, Hashimoto joined the National Defense Brotherhood in the Diet rather than the mainstream Dai Nippon Seijikai (大日本政治会).

After the end of the war, he was sentenced to life imprisonment in Sugamo Prison by the International Military Tribunal for the Far East. He was liberared later on, however, and unsuccessfully attempted to be elected in the Sangi-in. He died in 1957. A book was published by Nakano Masao under the title "Hashimoto Taisa no Shuki" in 1963, based on his notes and diaries.
