= The Basic Principles of National Defense and Proposal for Strengthening It =

1934 Japanese Army Ministry pamphlet

- Author: Army Ministry Press Section
- Original title: 国防の本義と其強化の提唱
- Language: Japanese
- Subject: National defense, political economy
- Genre: Political pamphlet
- Publisher: Army Ministry Press Section
- Publication date: October 1934
- Media type: Print (pamphlet)
- Pages: 56 (B6 format)

The Basic Principles of National Defense and Proposal for Strengthening It (国防の本義と其強化の提唱, Kokubō no hongi to sono kyōka no teishō) is a pamphlet published in October 1934 by the Press Section of the Army Ministry of Japan. Issued in B6 format with 56 pages, approximately 600,000 copies were printed. It is known for the opening sentence of its preface: "War is the father of creation and the mother of culture."

The pamphlet came to be known as the "Army Pamphlet," and the controversy surrounding it is referred to as the "Army Pamphlet Incident."

== Overview ==
The draft was prepared by officers who had been sent as students to Tokyo Imperial University, including Sumihisa Ikeda (then a major, Faculty of Economics) and Ryōji Shikata (then a major, Faculty of Law). It was reviewed by the Press Section under section chiefs Teiichi Suzuki (August 1933 – March 1934) and Hiroshi Nemoto (March 1934 – February 1936), approved by Military Affairs Bureau Director Tetsuzan Nagata, and authorized by Army Minister Senjūrō Hayashi before publication. Its content was essentially a more concrete version of Ikki Kita's An Outline Plan for the Reorganization of Japan.

Because the pamphlet advocated the establishment of a socialist state and the adoption of a planned economy under Army leadership, it provoked widespread debate. It has been characterized as advocating a military-fascist system.

The officers involved in its preparation belonged to the Tōseiha (Control Faction). The rival Kōdōha (Imperial Way Faction) did not openly oppose it. While the Kōdōha opposed excessive managed economy as communist in nature, it had no objection to the establishment of a militarist system.

Party politicians strongly opposed the pamphlet, and the Army Minister was questioned in the Diet. However, its advocacy of a controlled economy—based on the view that "if only a portion of the people enjoy economic profits, particularly unearned income, while the majority of the people suffer extreme hardship, giving rise to class antagonism, this is a problem that cannot be overlooked from the standpoint of general national policy, still less from that of national defense"—won support from reformist figures such as Seigō Nakano and Katsumaro Akamatsu. In particular, Hisashi Asō, secretary-general of the Social Masses Party, offered enthusiastic praise, declaring that "those who do not advance in accordance with the pamphlet are dropouts from social reform activities."

Criticism also came from Tatsukichi Minobe and others. The November issue of the magazine Chūō Kōron featured a special section titled "General Critique of Army National Policy." In his essay "Reading the Army's Statement on National Defense," Minobe criticized the pamphlet for "ignoring the established policies of the state and truly violating the sacred intent of national unity." Minobe incurred the Army's resentment and was soon attacked in connection with the Emperor Organ Theory controversy.

Contemporary foreign reporting noted that the pamphlet called for a socialist-style program to remedy rural distress and strengthen national defense.

== Influence and evaluation ==
=== Public comment ===
A private postcard was attached at the end of the booklet so that readers could write their opinions and send them to the Army Ministry. This constituted a form of public consultation inviting popular opinion, which was unusual and innovative for the government and political parties of the time and attracted public attention. The opinions received by postcard and other means were published the following year as a collection of comments on the pamphlet.

=== Differences from similar publications ===
Following the Mukden Incident of September 1931, the Army issued 18 pamphlets in 1931, 37 in 1932, and 33 in 1933 to justify its actions to the public.

The Basic Principles of National Defense and Proposal for Strengthening It differed significantly in that it marked the first time the military openly addressed ideological and economic issues and publicly indicated its intention to intervene in politics.

=== Newspaper publicity ===
Prior to publication, the Army had requested extensive coverage from the major newspapers, generating a large response. Economist Seibi Hijikata remarked that "it would have been more appropriate for the Army to publish it to the nation through the Cabinet rather than independently and directly."
