= Hisashi Asō =

Japanese politician (1891–1940)

- 麻生 久
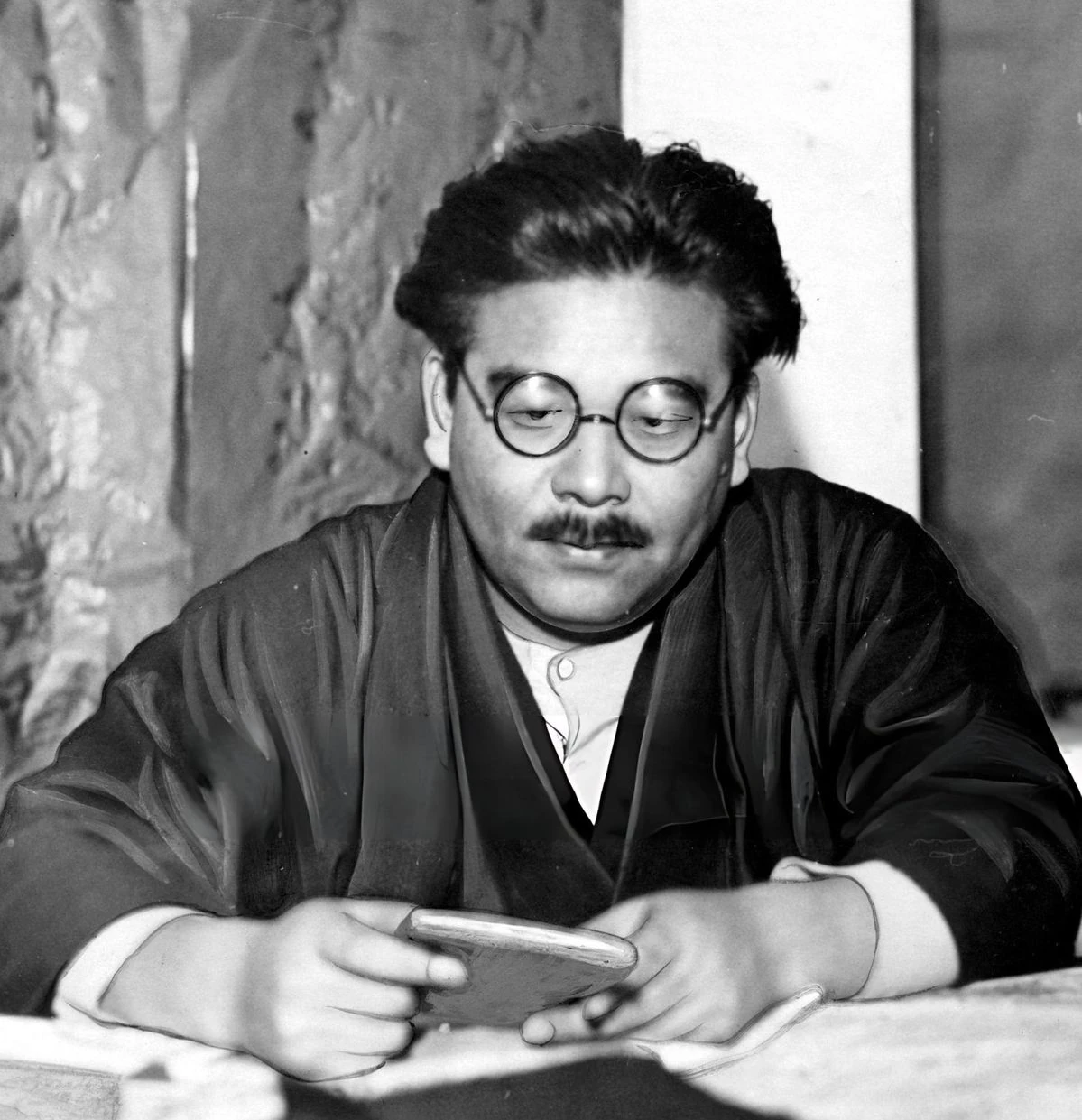
- Asō, c. 1932

Member of the House of Representatives
- In office 20 February 1936 – 6 September 1940
- Preceded by: Multi-member district
- Succeeded by: Ōhashi Seitarō
- Constituency: Tokyo 5th

Personal details
- Born: 24 May 1891 Kusu, Ōita, Japan
- Died: 6 September 1940 (aged 49) Tokyo, Japan
- Resting place: Tama Cemetery
- Party: Shakai Taishūtō (1932–1940)
- Other political affiliations: LFP (1926); JLFP (1926–1928); JMP (1928–1930); National Masses Party (1930–1931); National Labour-Farmer Mass Party (1931–1932)
- Spouse: Hisa Asō
- Children: Yoshikata Asō
- Education: Tokyo Imperial University

Hisashi Asō (麻生 久, Asō Hisashi; 24 May 1891 – 6 September 1940), pen name Asayama Kaikei (麻山 改介), was a Japanese socialist politician and trade unionist active in the Taishō and early Shōwa periods. A graduate of Tokyo Imperial University, he rose in the labour movement through the Yūaikai and as founder of the All Japan Miners' Federation, leading major strikes before helping establish successive centrist proletarian parties. He served as secretary-general and later chairman of the Social Mass Party (Shakai Taishūtō), was elected to the House of Representatives for Tokyo's 5th district in 1936 and 1937, and subsequently advocated collaboration with right-wing renovationist elements and the military, dissolving the party in July 1940 to support Fumimaro Konoe's New Order movement. He was a mentor to Inejirō Asanuma, the future chairman of the Japan Socialist Party.

== Biography ==
=== Early life and education ===
Hisashi Asō was born on 24 May 1891 in Higashi-Iida Village, Kusu District, Ōita Prefecture (present-day Kokonoe, Ōita). He attended the old-system Ōita Middle School (now Ōita Prefectural Ōita Uenogaoka High School), graduated from the Third Higher School in 1913, and entered the French Law Department of Tokyo Imperial University that year, graduating in 1917. During his student days he immersed himself in Russian literature, particularly Tolstoy and Turgenev, which sparked his interest in the Russian Revolution. He was also known for his flamboyant relationships with women.

After graduation Asō joined the Tokyo Nichinichi Shimbun (now Mainichi Shimbun) as a journalist in 1917 but soon left.

=== Labour movement ===
In 1918 he serialized "From Peter to Lenin" in the paper, openly supporting the Russian Revolution. That same year, with Sakuzō Yoshino and others, he helped found the Renmeikai (Dawn Society), an enlightenment organization for Taishō democracy, involving prominent intellectuals such as Inazō Nitobe, Ikuo Ōyama, Shinzo Koizumi, and Akiko Yosano. He participated in the Thursday Society and, as a senior, in the Shinjinkai at Tokyo Imperial University.

In 1919 Asō joined the Yūaikai (Friendly Society), later serving as its publishing section chief, and with his contemporary Kotora Tanahashi pushed the organization, originally inclined toward labour-management harmony, toward more radical and militant positions. On 2 December 1919 he and 14 other union leaders were arrested during a speech event organized by the Hitachi branch, leading to its collapse. In 1920 he founded the All Japan Miners' Federation and led disputes at the Ashio Copper Mine, Hitachi Copper Mine, Yūbari Coal Mine and elsewhere, resulting in repeated imprisonments. His eldest son Yoshikata was born in 1923; that year he published Swimming in the Muddy Stream.

In 1925 Asō became political section chief of the Japan General Federation of Labour (successor to the Yūaikai). He participated in proletarian party movements and became a central executive committee member of the Labour-Farmer Party upon its formation in 1926. After internal left–right splits dissolved the party, he co-founded the Japan Labour-Farmer Party in December 1926 with Toshio Miwa, Shōichi Miyake, Yamana Yoshitsuru and others. He subsequently held leadership roles (secretary-general or chairman) in the successive centrist proletarian parties: the Japan Masses Party, National Masses Party, and National Labour-Farmer Mass Party.

Around the late 1920s Asō also acted as defence counsel in a disturbance case involving sugar-cane farmers and a Japanese sugar company in a tropical colony (almost certainly Taiwan). In a 1929 essay he described the company's practice of arbitrarily harvesting mature cane without prior agreement on quantity or price, the subsequent police escalation of the commercial dispute into mass arrests and prolonged pre-trial detention, and the colonial courtroom's inability to answer a defendant's pointed comparison with ordinary commercial practice in Japan proper. In the same piece he recounted witnessing a Japanese official (later revealed as a police chief) strike a local boy after colliding with him on a bicycle, and the subsequent intervention by a military policeman that exposed inter-service rivalry between the police and the kenpeitai. Asō presented these episodes as revealing fragments of colonial life and power relations.

=== Relationship with Inejirō Asanuma ===
Asō was an important early influence on Inejirō Asanuma. In his memoirs, Asanuma recalled working alongside Asō in the labour movement. On 1 September 1923, Asanuma and Asō (together with Komakichi Matsuoka) were among the speakers at a social-issues meeting in Ōmama, Gunma Prefecture, attended by approximately 800 people when the 1923 Great Kantō earthquake struck.

Asanuma later became involved in the labour movement at the Ashio Copper Mine. Following his arrest during a strike in 1924, he was defended in court by Asō, Tetsu Katayama, and Jusō Miwa. Asanuma also recalled that Asō was among the senior activists at the headquarters of the Japan Miners' Union, alongside Kanju Katō and Manabu Sano, whose activities strongly attracted him to the mining labour movement.

From the mid-1920s onward the two men remained closely aligned within the intermediate current of the proletarian parties. After the short-lived Farmer-Labour Party (1925), Asanuma joined the Japan Labour-Farmer Party, of which Asō became a leading figure; Asanuma served as organisation director. When the various proletarian parties merged into the Social Mass Party in 1932, Asō became its secretary-general and Asanuma one of its central executive committee members. Asanuma was deeply impressed by Asō's personality and wholeheartedly supported the latter's turn toward a form of national socialism that sought social transformation through cooperation with the military.

In a later autobiographical essay, Asanuma described himself, Asō, Jōtarō Kawakami, and Miwa as belonging to the same political tradition originating in the Japan Labour-Farmer Party, which he described as part of the older political "lineage" of the postwar socialist movement.

Asō's sudden death from heart failure on 6 September 1940 was a severe personal and political blow to Asanuma. Contemporary and later biographical accounts state that Asanuma regarded Asō as his spiritual pillar; the loss left him in deep distress and contributed to his decision to withdraw from national politics and decline to stand in the 1942 Yokusan election. This withdrawal later helped him avoid the postwar purge of public officials.

The personal connection continued into the next generation: Asō’s eldest son, Yoshikata Asō, later served as Asanuma’s secretary before entering the Diet himself.

=== Social Mass Party and Diet career ===
In 1932 the National Labour-Farmer Mass Party merged with the Social People's Party to form the Social Mass Party, where Asō became secretary-general (chairman: Isoo Abe). From this period he sought to expand socialist influence by aligning with the military's “renovationist” elements. Although condemning the Manchurian Incident as capitalistic and imperialist, he claimed it pushed the army in an anti-capitalist direction and became involved in the 1931 March incident. He praised the 1934 Army pamphlet The Basic Principles of National Defense and Proposal for Strengthening It as expressing socialist tendencies in the military and became one of its strongest advocates alongside Kan'ichirō Kamei. With Kamei he advanced the party's shift toward totalitarianism.

Asō was elected to the House of Representatives for Tokyo's 5th district in the 1936 general election and reelected in 1937. With the outbreak of the Second Sino-Japanese War in 1937 he supported the government on condition of localized resolution and non-escalation, approving military budgets. In 1938 he and Kamei worked with Akiyama Teisuke to draft plans for a new reformist, totalitarian party led by themselves and Fumimaro Konoe. In 1939 he attempted a merger with Tōhōkai under Seigō Nakano to explore right-wing ties, though it failed at the last minute despite pushing against Abe's reservations.

In 1940, amid the controversy over Saitō Takao's anti-military speech, Asō supported Saitō's expulsion from the House. He purged party members who opposed the expulsion, including Abe Isoo, Bunji Suzuki, Tetsu Katayama, Suehiro Nishio, Chōzaburō Mizutani and Jiichirō Matsumoto, and succeeded Abe as party president. Cooperating actively with Konoe's New Order movement, he dissolved the Social Mass Party on 6 July 1940, ahead of other parties, anticipating a leading role in the Imperial Rule Assistance Association. He joined the preparatory committee for the new system under the Second Konoe Cabinet. He died of heart failure on 6 September 1940 at the age of 49. He is buried at Tama Cemetery.

== Evaluation ==
Asō was described in contemporary and later accounts as an action-oriented, boss-like personality. He believed Japan's revolution could succeed only through collaboration among military forces, proletarian forces, the Emperor, and popular forces. As military dictatorship intensified, however, he supported the military, the Sino-Japanese War and the Imperial Rule Assistance Association while suppressing internal opposition, leading some later commentators to view his stance as war-affirming.

== Family ==
- Eldest son: Yoshikata Asō (secretary to Inejirō Asanuma; later member of the House of Representatives)
- Grandson: Teruhisa Asō (Shinjuku Ward assembly member)

== Selected works ==
- A Labour Activist's Soliloquy (Kinsei Shakai Shisō Sōsho), Ōtōkaku, 1921
- The Crowd Striving to Live, Shinkōsha, 1923
- Swimming in the Muddy Stream, Shinkōsha, 1923 (reissued by Kaizōsha, 1930)
- Dawn, Shinkōsha, 1924
- Theory and Practice of Proletarian Parties, Kagaku Shisō Fukyūkai, 1924
- Those Crossing Life, Shinkōsha, 1925
- What Is a Proletarian Party? The Newly Born Labour-Farmer Party, Shichōsha, 1926
- An Incident That Occurred in a Certain Colony (某殖民地發生的事變), 1929 (Chinese translation by Xie Liuyi; included in the collection Fan Mou de Fanzui / 范某的犯罪)
- Talks on Socialism, Seibundō Jūsen Bunko, 1930
- Life Exists in Struggle, Ōtōkaku, 1930
- Father, Do Not Grieve: A Full-Length Novel, Senshinsha, 1930
- The Approaching Crisis of World War: Positively Recognize the Current Situation (National Policy Studies No. 3), Kokusaku Kenkyūsha, 1938
- The Meaning of Modern War, Shakai Taishūtō Shuppanbu, 1938
- Selected Works of Hisashi Asō Vol. 2 (Dawn), Kaikō Shoten, 1947

Translation

- James Welsh, Heroes from the Bottom: The Story of Coal Miner Robert Sinclair, co-translated with Yasuo Watanabe, Shinkōsha, 1924

== Biographies ==
- Biography of Hisashi Asō, compiled by Hisashi Asō Biography Publication Committee, 1958
- Shōichi Miyake, History of Japanese Social Movements in a Turbulent Period: The Trajectories of Toyohiko Kagawa, Hisashi Asō, and Inejirō Asanuma, Gendai Hyōronsha, 1973

== See also ==
- Reform faction (Japan)
- The Basic Principles of National Defense and Proposal for Strengthening It
