= Curse on This Country =

2016 history book by Danny Orbach

Curse on This country:The Rebellious Army of Imperial Japan
- Author: Danny Orbach
- Language: English
- Publisher: Cornell University Press
- Publication date: 2016
- Pages: 384
- ISBN: 978-1-5017-0528-1

Curse on This Country: The Rebellious Army of Imperial Japan is a 2016 history book by Danny Orbach, a professor at Hebrew University in Jerusalem. It deals with a variety of rebellions by the Imperial military though the 19th and early 20th century. It argues that a culture of disobedience and rebellion existed in the Japanese army, deriving from the tradition of the shishi (warriors of high aspirations), rebellious samurai active in the 1860s. It preserved itself and expanded over decades, due to political conditions, historical circumstances and the institutional development of the Imperial Japanese Army. It was fed by enduring leniency to right-wing rebels as long as their motives were "pure".

The book traces this culture of military insubordination through its earliest manifestations, exploring such incidents as the Taiwan Expedition (1874), the Satsuma Rebellion (1877), and the assassinations of Queen Min (1895) and Zhang Zuolin (1928), as well as terrorist activities of groups such as the Cherry Blossom Society (1931) and the Young Officers Movement (1936). Finally, it argues that the Japanese Army's culture of disobedience helped to push the country towards unbridled imperialism, entanglement in China, and finally the Pacific War.
