= Shūmei Ōkawa =

Japanese nationalist and Pan-Asianist ideologue (1886–1957)

- 大川 周明
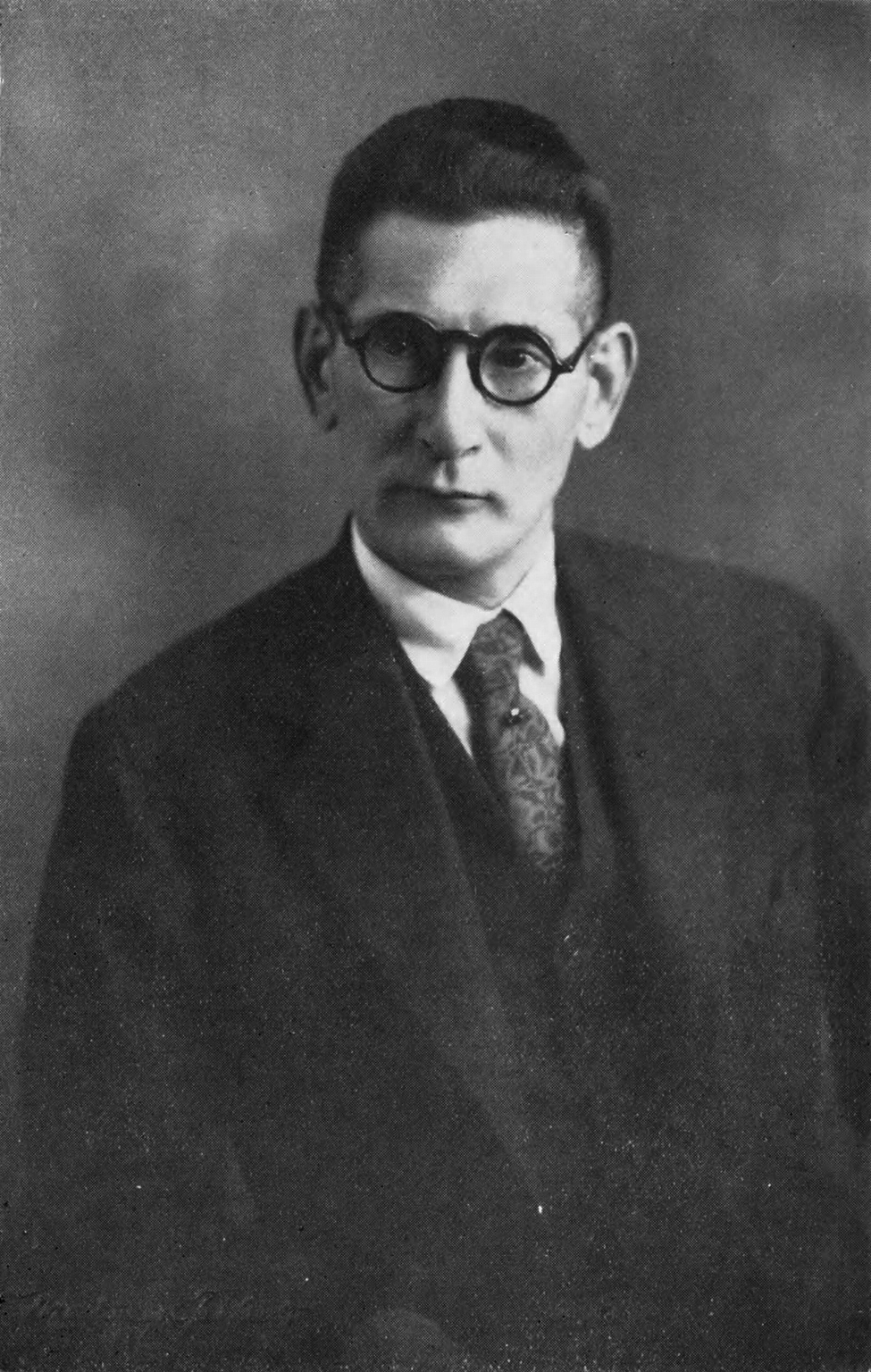
- Shūmei Ōkawa, c. 1936
- Born: 6 December 1886; Sakata, Yamagata, Japan
- Died: 24 December 1957 (aged 71); Tokyo, Japan
- Education: Tokyo Imperial University, 1911, Ph.D. 1926
- Occupations: Educator, political philosopher, Islamic scholar, historian
- Employers: Southern Manchuria Railway Company and the East Asian Economic Research Bureau (1918–1935?, 1938–1945); Takushoku University (1920–19??)
- Known for: Founder of the nationalist organisation Yūzonsha, alongside Kita Ikki; Founder of the nationalist magazine Nippon; Involvement in two failed military coups against the Japanese government (March 1931 and October 1931)
- Criminal charges: Attempted coups (1932); War crimes (1945)
- Parent: Shūkei Ōkawa (d. 1914)

Shūmei Ōkawa (大川 周明, Ōkawa Shūmei; 6 December 1886 – 24 December 1957) was a Japanese nationalist and writer, known for his publications on Japanese history, philosophy of religion, Indian philosophy, and colonialism.

Ōkawa advocated a form of Pan-Asianism which promoted Asian solidarity as a cover for Japanese imperialism and beliefs in Japanese racial supremacy. He co-founded the Japanese radical nationalist group Yūzonsha, and in 1926 he published his most influential work: Japan and the Way of the Japanese (Nihon oyobi Nihonjin no michi), which was so popular that it would be reprinted 46 times by the end of World War II. Ōkawa was also involved in a number of attempted coups d'état by the Japanese military, including the March Incident. After his arrest following the March incident, Ōkawa was protected by the intervention of General Kazushige Ugaki, and received a sentence of five years in prison, of which he served two years. He continued to publish numerous books and articles, helping popularize the idea that a "clash of civilizations" between the East and West was inevitable, and that Japan was destined to be the liberator and protector of Asia against the United States and other Western nations.

In the Tokyo tribunal after the end of World War II, Ōkawa was prosecuted as a class-A war criminal based on his role as an ideologue. The Allies described him as the "Japanese Goebbels", and of the twenty-eight people indicted with this charge, he was the only one not a military officer or government official. The case against him was dropped when he was found mentally unfit to stand trial. Ōkawa's writings were used in the final verdict as part of the evidence for the crime of conspiracy to commit aggression.

== Early life ==
Ōkawa was born in Sakata, Yamagata, Japan in 1886. He graduated from Tokyo Imperial University in 1911, where he had studied Vedic literature and classical Indian philosophy. After graduation, Ōkawa worked for the Imperial Japanese Army General Staff doing translation work. He had a sound knowledge of Arabic, German, French, English, Sanskrit and Pali.

He briefly flirted with socialism in his college years, but in the summer of 1913 he read a copy of Sir Henry Cotton's New India, or India in Transition (1886, revised 1905) which dealt with the contemporary political situation. After reading this book, Ōkawa abandoned "complete cosmopolitanism" (sekaijin) for Pan-Asianism. Later that year articles by Anagarika Dharmapala and Maulavi Barkatullah appeared in the magazine Michi, published by Dōkai, a religious organization in which Ōkawa was later to play a prominent part. While he studied, he briefly housed the Indian independence leader Rash Behari Bose.

After years of study of foreign philosophies, he became increasingly convinced that the solution to Japan's social and political problems lay in an alliance with Asian independence movements, a revival of pre-modern Japanese philosophy, and a renewed emphasis on the kokutai principles.

== Nationalist ideologue ==
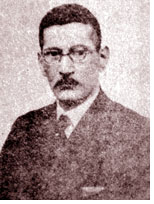
Ōkawa, age 35, as a professor at Takushoku University

In 1918, Ōkawa went to work for the South Manchurian Railway Company, under its East Asian Research Bureau. Together with Ikki Kita he founded the nationalist discussion group and political club Yūzonsha. In the 1920s, he became an instructor of history and colonial policy at Takushoku University, where he was also active in the creation of anti-capitalist and nationalist student groups. Meanwhile, he introduced Rudolf Steiner's theory of social threefolding to Japan. He developed a friendship with Aikido founder Morihei Ueshiba during this time period.

In 1922, he published Fukkô Ajia no Shomondai in 1922. Ōkawa hailed the movements started by Mahatma Gandhi in India and Mustafa Kemal in Turkey as new types of Asian revival.

Ōkawa believed in a narrative of history based on a dichotomy between Eastern and Western civilizations, writing that "world history, in its true sense of the word, is nothing but a chronicle of antagonism, struggle and unification between the Orient and the Occident." Ōkawa advocated a form of Pan-Asianism which promoted Asian solidarity as a cover for Japanese imperialism and beliefs in Japanese racial supremacy. He wrote that there would be a war "for the establishment of a new world" between Japan and the United States. In 1926, Ōkawa published his most influential work: Japan and the Way of the Japanese (Nihon oyobi Nihonjin no michi), which was so popular that it was reprinted 46 times by the end of World War II. He continued to publish numerous books and articles, helping popularize the idea that a "clash of civilizations" between the East and West was inevitable, and that Japan was destined to be the liberator and protector of Asia against the United States and other Western nations.

== Coup attempts ==
In the early 1930s, Ōkawa was involved in a number of attempted coups d'état by the Japanese military.

During the March Incident, Ōkawa was a leader in attempting to foment a riot outside the Diet Building in Tokyo, which was intended to initiate the coup. When the riot failed to occur, Ōkawa wrote a letter to General Kazushige Ugaki explaining the plot and asking for his cooperation. Ugaki declined, but when the plotters were arrested after making another attempt at the riot, he intervened to hush up the whole collapsed affair and ensured that the plotters received very mild punishments. For his role in the March incident, Ōkawa was sentenced to five years in prison in 1935. Released after only two years, he briefly re-joined the South Manchurian Railway Company before accepting a post as a professor at Hosei University in 1939.

== Tokyo War Crimes Tribunal ==
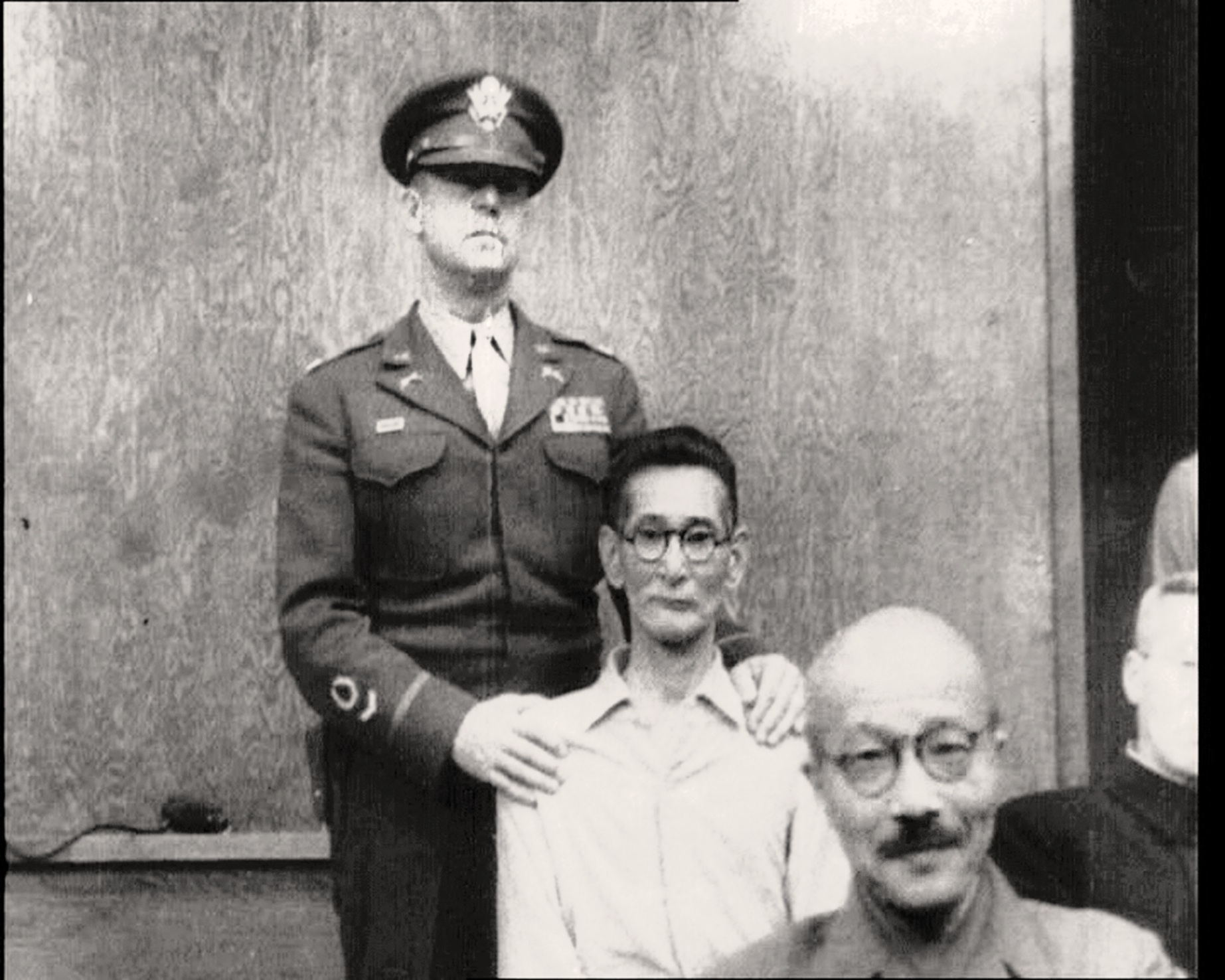
Ōkawa (seated in middle) in court. He had just slapped Tojo's (seated in front) head and is being restrained by a guard (standing behind).

In the Tokyo tribunal after the end of World War II, Ōkawa was prosecuted as a class-A war criminal based on his role as an ideologue. Of the twenty-eight people indicted with this charge, he was the only one not a military officer or government official. The Allies described him as the "Japanese Goebbels" and said he had long agitated for a war between Japan and the West. For example, in his 1924 book Asia, Europe, and Japan, he had predicted an inevitable war to be fought between Eastern and Western civilizations, with Japan and the United States as the respective leaders, and discussed what he later described as "the sublime mission of Japan in the coming world war". In pre-trial hearings, Ōkawa said that his 1924 writings were merely a translation and commentary on Vladimir Solovyov's geopolitical philosophy, and "did not necessarily constitute a plan for a Japanese attack."

During the trial, Ōkawa behaved erratically, including dressing in pajamas, sitting barefoot, and slapping the head of former prime minister Hideki Tōjō while shouting in German "Inder! Kommen Sie!" (Come, Indian!). He also at one point shouted "This is act one of the comedy!" U.S. Army psychiatrist Daniel Jaffe examined him and reported that he was unfit to stand trial. The presiding judge Sir William Webb concluded that he was mentally ill and dropped the case against him. Some thought he was feigning madness. Because of the diagnosis, he was able to avoid potentially sharing the fate of the other defendants, of whom seven were hanged and the rest imprisoned. Ōkawa's writings were used by the prosecution and the final verdict as evidence for the crime of conspiracy to commit aggression.

== Post war ==
Ōkawa was transferred from jail to a US Army hospital in Japan, which confirmed his mental illness caused by syphilis. Later, he was transferred to Tokyo Metropolitan Matsuzawa Hospital, a mental hospital, where he completed the third Japanese translation of the Quran. He was released from hospital in 1948, shortly after the end of the trial. He spent the final years of his life writing a memoir, Anraku no Mon.

In October 1957, Prime Minister of India Jawaharlal Nehru requested to meet with him during a brief visit to Japan. The invitation was delivered to Ōkawa's house by an Indian Embassy official, who found that Ōkawa was already on his deathbed and was unable to leave the house. He died on 24 December 1957.

== Major publications ==
- Some Issues in Re-Emerging Asia (復興亜細亜の諸問題), 1922.
- A Study of the Japanese Spirit (日本精神研究), 1924.
- A Study of Chartered Colonisation Companies (特許植民会社制度研究), 1927.
- National History (国史読本), 1931.
- 2600 Years of the Japanese History (日本二千六百年史), 1939.
- History of Anglo-American Aggression in East Asia (米英東亜侵略史), 1941.

- Best-seller in Japan during WW2

- Introduction to Islam (回教概論), 1942.
- Quran (Japanese translation), 1950.

== Notes ==
Citations

Bibliography

- Calvocoressi, Peter; Wint, Guy; Pritchard, R John (1999). The Penguin History of the Second World War. London: Penguin. ISBN 0-14-028502-4.
- Jaffe, Eric (2014). A curious madness : an American combat psychiatrist, a Japanese war crimes suspect, and an unsolved mystery from World War II (First Scribner hardcover ed.). New York: Scribner. ISBN 9781451612059. LCCN 2013040208. "eric jaffe."
- Jansen, Marius B. (2000). The Making of Modern Japan. Belknap Press. ISBN 0-674-00991-6.
- Krämer, Hans Martin (August 2014). "Pan-Asianism's Religious Undercurrents: The Reception of Islam and Translation of the Qur'ān in Twentieth-Century Japan". The Journal of Asian Studies. 73 (3). Cambridge University Press: 619–640. doi:10.1017/S0021911814000989. S2CID 55349358.
- Maga, Timothy P. (2001). Judgment at Tokyo: The Japanese War Crimes Trials. University Press of Kentucky. ISBN 0-8131-2177-9.
- Samuels, Richard J (2007). Securing Japan: Tokyo's Grand Strategy and the Future of East Asia. Cornell University Press. ISBN 978-0-8014-4612-2.
- Wakabayashi, Bob (2007). Modern Japanese Thought. Cornell University Press. ISBN 978-0-8014-4612-2.
