= Soviet–Japanese Neutrality Pact =

1941 non-aggression agreement between the USSR and Imperial Japan

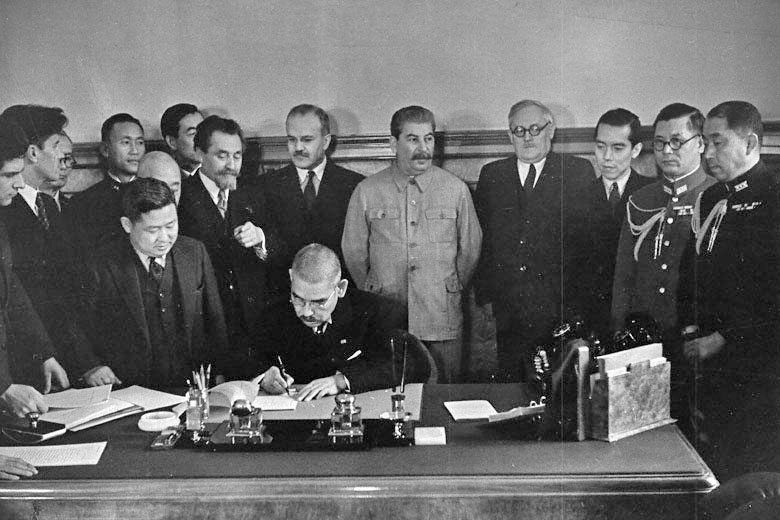
- Japanese Foreign Minister Yōsuke Matsuoka signing the pact
- Type: Bilateral treaty
- Signed: April 13, 1941
- Location: Moscow, Russian SFSR, Soviet Union
- Expiration: April 13, 1946 (Note: Denounced by the Soviet Union on April 5, 1945)
- Signatories: Vyacheslav Molotov; Yōsuke Matsuoka; Yoshitsugu Tatekawa
- Parties: Soviet Union; Japan

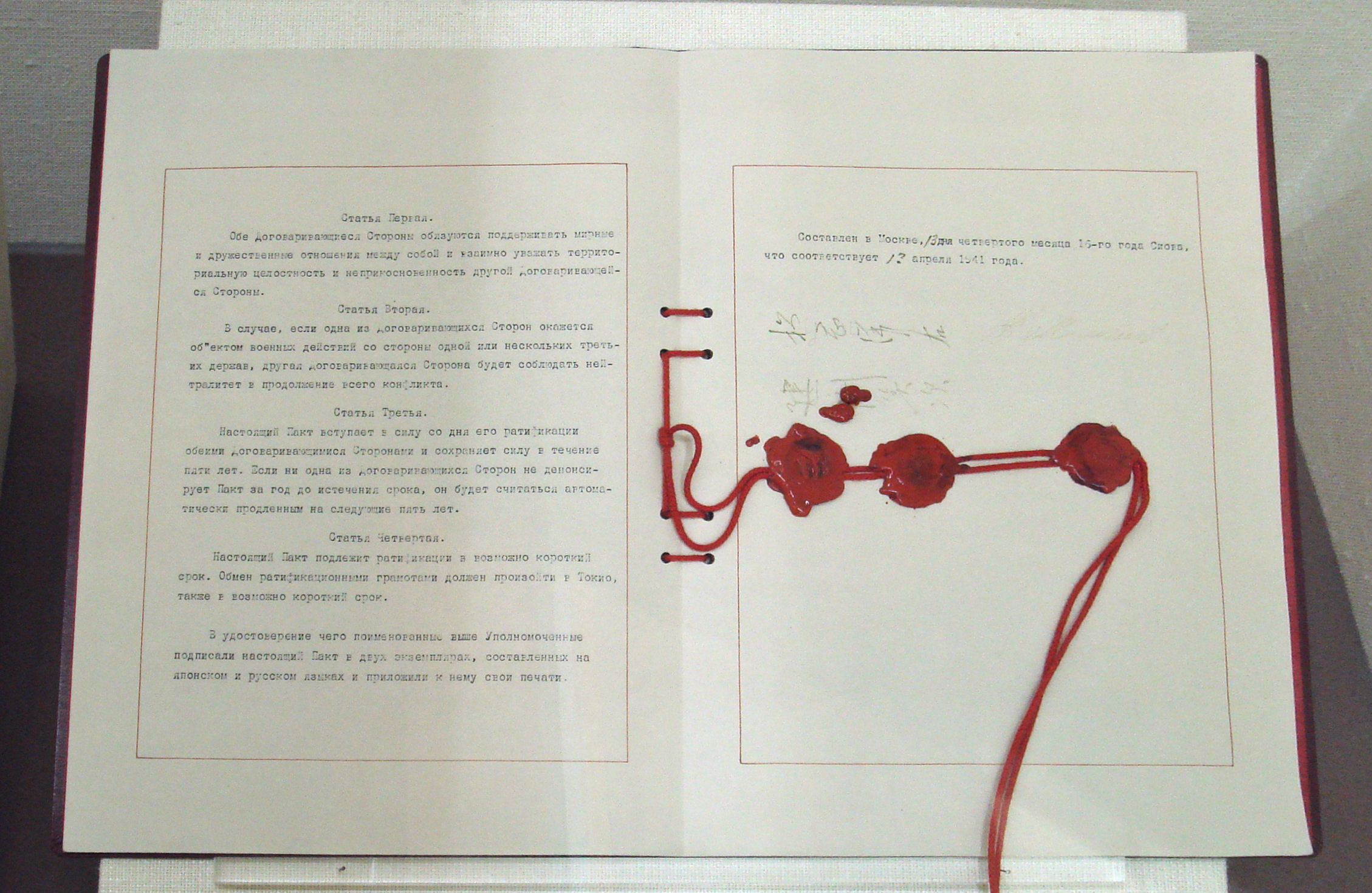
Soviet–Japanese Neutrality Pact, April 13, 1941

The Soviet–Japanese Neutrality Pact (日ソ中立条約, Nisso Chūritsu Jōyaku), also known as the Japanese–Soviet Non-aggression Pact (日ソ不可侵条約, Nisso Fukashin Jōyaku), was a non-aggression pact between the Soviet Union and the Empire of Japan signed on April 13, 1941, two years after the conclusion of the Soviet–Japanese Border War. The agreement meant that for most of World War II, the two nations fought against each other's allies but not against each other. In 1945, late in the war, the Soviets scrapped the pact and joined the Allied campaign against Japan.

== Background ==
After the Fall of France and then the expansion of the Axis powers, the Soviet Union wished to mend its diplomatic relations in the Far East to safeguard its eastern border and to concentrate on the European Theatre of World War II. On the other hand, the Empire of Japan was bogged down in a seemingly-interminable war against China and had rapidly-deteriorating diplomatic relations with the United States. Those factors made the Japanese seek an accommodation with the Soviet Union to improve its international standing and to secure the northern border of Manchukuo from a possible Soviet invasion.

Soviet premier Joseph Stalin was initially unaware of Adolf Hitler's briefing to his generals that an attack on the Soviet Union by the European Axis Powers would let Japan overtly challenge the United States. That briefing was based on the belief that if such an attack occurred, the Soviet Union would be too preoccupied with fighting Nazi Germany. That would make Japan feel less threatened by any possible Soviet invasion of Manchukuo and allow Japan to have enough provisions and capabilities to start a war against the United States. The pact would allow both Japan and the Soviet Union to avoid fighting on multiple fronts.

Stalin believed that his "problems can be solved in a natural way if the Soviets and the Japanese cooperate". After concluding the nonaggression treaty, Stalin, in an unprecedented gesture, saw Japanese Foreign Minister Yosuke Matsuoka off at the train station. That was symbolic of the importance that Stalin, who rarely appeared before foreign diplomats, attached to the treaty. It also provided him with the occasion, in the presence of the entire diplomatic corps, to invite negotiations with Germany and to flaunt his increased bargaining power.

== Signing ==
The treaty was signed in Moscow on April 13, 1941, by Foreign Minister Yosuke Matsuoka and Ambassador Yoshitsugu Tatekawa for Japan and Foreign Minister Vyacheslav Molotov for the Soviet Union.

The same day, all three men also signed a declaration regarding Mongolia and Manchukuo. The Soviet Union pledged to respect the territorial integrity and the inviolability of Manchukuo, and Japan did the same for Mongolia.

== Effects ==
Following the signing of the pact, Soviet aid to the Nationalist government in mainland China during the Second Sino-Japanese War was halted. On April 16, the Chinese Communist Party (CCP) issued a statement attempting to justify the pact. The CCP stated that the pact was "a great victory for Soviet diplomacy" and "was beneficial to liberation throughout China."

Later in 1941, Japan, as a signatory of the Tripartite Pact, considered denouncing the Soviet–Japanese Neutrality Pact, especially after the German invasion of the Soviet Union, but it made the crucial decision to keep the pact and to expand southwards by instead invading the European colonies in Southeast Asia.

It is possible that if the Germans had won the Battle of Stalingrad, Japan would have invaded Siberia. General Tomoyuki Yamashita, who was known for his achievements in the Battle of Singapore, was sent to Manchuria in July 1942 and tasked with organizing troops for the invasion.

At the Yalta Conference in February 1945, Stalin secretly agreed to enter the war against Japan in exchange for American and British recognition of certain Soviet territorial claims in Asia. The Soviet offensive was to start within three months after the end of the war in Europe.

== Soviet denunciation ==
On April 5, 1945, the Soviet Union denounced the pact with Japan by informing the Japanese government that "in accordance with Article Three of the above mentioned pact, which envisaged the right of denunciation one year before the lapse of the five-year period of operation of the pact, the Soviet Government hereby makes known to the Government of Japan its wish to denounce the pact of April 13, 1941." The wording of the denunciation suggested that the Soviet Union wished to see the treaty go out of effect immediately, and Time magazine reported that the Soviet Foreign Commissar's tone indicated that the Soviet Union might soon go to war against Japan.

The text of the treaty had stated that the pact remained "valid for five years" (i.e., until April 13, 1946). When Japanese Ambassador Naotake Sato pressed him, Molotov assured him that the treaty would remain in force until April 1946. The treaty also stated, "In case neither of the Contracting Parties denounces the Pact one year before the expiration of the term, it will be considered automatically prolonged for the next five years" (April 13, 1946 - April 13, 1951). The denunciation came on April 5, 1945, which under those terms meant that the treaty would not renew on April 13, 1946.

On May 8 or 9, 1945, the date depending on the time zone, Nazi Germany surrendered, which ended the war in Europe and started the secret three-month countdown for the Soviets to start hostilities against Japan. On August 9, 1945, just after midnight in Manchuria, the Soviets invaded Manchuria. The declaration of war against Japan followed nearly six hours later. Because of the time zone difference of 7 hours, the declaration of war could be still dated August 8, 1945, and was presented to the Japanese ambassador in Moscow at 11 p.m. Moscow time.

During the Soviet invasion, Japanese forces on the Asian mainland were unprepared to resist and were overrun relatively quickly. In the last campaign of the war, Soviet territorial gains in Asia were Manchukuo, Mengjiang (Inner Mongolia) and northern Korea.

== Text of pact ==
PACT OF NEUTRALITY BETWEEN UNION OF SOVIET SOCIALIST REPUBLICS AND JAPAN

The Presidium of the Supreme Soviet of the Union of Soviet Socialist Republics and His Majesty the Emperor of Japan, guided by a desire to strengthen peaceful and friendly relations between the two countries, have decided to conclude a pact on neutrality, for which purpose they have appointed as their Representatives:

- The Presidum of the Supreme Soviet of the Union of Soviet Socialist Republics -
  - Vyacheslav Mikhailovich Molotov, Chairman of the Council of People's Commissars and People's Commissar of Foreign Affairs of the Union of Soviet Socialist Republics;
- His Majesty the Emperor of Japan -
  - Yosuke Matsuoka, Minister of Foreign Affairs, Jusanmin, Cavalier of the Order of the Sacred Treasure of the First Class, and
  - Yoshitsugu Tatekawa, Ambassador Extraordinary and Plenipotentiary to the Union of Soviet Socialist Republics, Lieutenant General, Jusanmin, Cavalier of the Order of the Rising Sun of the First Class and the Order of the Golden Kite of the Fourth Class,

who, after an exchange of their credentials, which were found in due and proper form, have agreed on the following:

- Article one: Both Contracting Parties undertake to maintain peaceful and friendly relations between them and mutually respect the territorial integrity and inviolability of the other Contracting Party.
- Article two: Should one of the Contracting Parties become the object of hostilities on the part of one or several third powers, the other Contracting Party will observe neutrality throughout the duration of the conflict.
- Article three: The present Pact comes into force from the day of its ratification by both Contracting Parties and remains valid for five years. In case neither of the Contracting Parties denounces the Pact one year before the expiration of the term, it will be considered automatically prolonged for the next five years.
- Article four: The present Pact is subject to ratification as soon as possible. The instruments of ratification shall be exchanged in Tokyo, also as soon as possible.

In confirmation whereof the above-named Representatives have signed the present Pact in two copies, drawn up in the Russian and Japanese languages, and affixed thereto their seals.

Done in Moscow on April 13, 1941, which corresponds to the 13th day of the fourth month of the 16th year of Showa.

V. Molotov;
Yosuke Matsuoka;
Yoshitsugu Tatekawa

== Text of declaration ==
DECLARATION

In conformity with the spirit of the Pact on neutrality concluded on April 13, 1941, between the U.S.S.R. and Japan, the Government of the U.S.S.R. and the Government of Japan, in the interest of insuring peaceful and friendly relations between the two countries, solemnly declare that the U.S.S.R. pledges to respect the territorial integrity and inviolability of Manchoukuo and Japan pledges to respect the territorial integrity and inviolability of the Mongolian People's Republic.

Moscow, April 13, 1941

On behalf of the Government of the U.S.S.R.
V. MOLOTOV

On behalf of the Government of Japan
YOSUKE MATSUOKA
YOSHITSUGU TATEKAWA

== Text of denunciation ==
Soviet Denunciation of the Pact with Japan

The American Ambassador at Moscow transmitted to the Secretary of State, by a telegram dated April 5, 1945, the following statement, as received from the press section of the Foreign Office, regarding Soviet denunciation of the U.S.S.R.-Japanese neutrality pact:

"Today at 3 p.m. People's Commissar for Foreign Affairs of the USSR Mr. V. M. Molotov, received the Japanese Ambassador, Mr. N. Sato, and made the following statement to him in the name of the Soviet Government:

'The neutrality pact between the Soviet Union and Japan was concluded on April 13, 1941, that is, before the attack of Germany on the USSR and before the outbreak of war between Japan on the one hand and England and the United States on the other. Since that time the situation has been basically altered. Germany has attacked the USSR, and Japan, ally of Germany, is aiding the latter in its war against the USSR. Furthermore Japan is waging a war with the USA and England, which are allies of the Soviet Union.

In these circumstances the neutrality pact between Japan and the USSR has lost its sense, and the prolongation of that pact has become impossible.

On the strength of the above and in accordance with Article Three of the above mentioned pact, which envisaged the right of denunciation one year before the lapse of the five-year period of operation of the pact, the Soviet Government hereby makes know [sic] to the Government of Japan its wish to denounce the pact of April 13, 1941.'

The Japanese Ambassador Mr. N. Sato, promised to inform the Japanese Government of the statement of the Soviet Government."

== Text of declaration of war ==
Soviet Declaration of War on Japan

London, Aug., 8, 1945 - Foreign Commissar Molotov's announcement of the declaration of war, as broadcast by Moscow, follows:

"On Aug. 8, People's Commissar for Foreign Affairs of the U.S.S.R. Molotov received the Japanese Ambassador, Mr. Sato, and gave him, on behalf of the Soviet Government, the following for transmission to the Japanese Government:

'After the defeat and capitulation of Hitlerite Germany, Japan became the only great power that still stood for the continuation of the war.

The demand of the three powers, the United States, Great Britain and China, on July 26 for the unconditional surrender of the Japanese armed forces was rejected by Japan, and thus the proposal of the Japanese Government to the Soviet Union on mediation in the war in the Far East loses all basis.

Taking into consideration the refusal of Japan to capitulate, the Allies submitted to the Soviet Government a proposal to join the war against Japanese aggression and thus shorten the duration of the war, reduce the number of victims and facilitate the speedy restoration of universal peace.

Loyal to its Allied duty, the Soviet Government has accepted the proposals of the Allies and has joined in the declaration of the Allied powers of July 26.

The Soviet Government considers that this policy is the only means able to bring peace nearer, free the people from further sacrifice and suffering and give the Japanese people the possibility of avoiding the dangers and destruction suffered by Germany after her refusal to capitulate unconditionally.

In view of the above, the Soviet Government declares that from tomorrow, that is from Aug. 9, the Soviet Government will consider itself to be at war with Japan.' "

== See also ==
- Japan–Soviet Union relations
- Molotov–Ribbentrop Pact
- Italo-Soviet Pact
- Potsdam Conference, Potsdam Declaration
