= Naotake Satō =

Japanese diplomat and politician (1882–1971)

- 佐藤 尚武
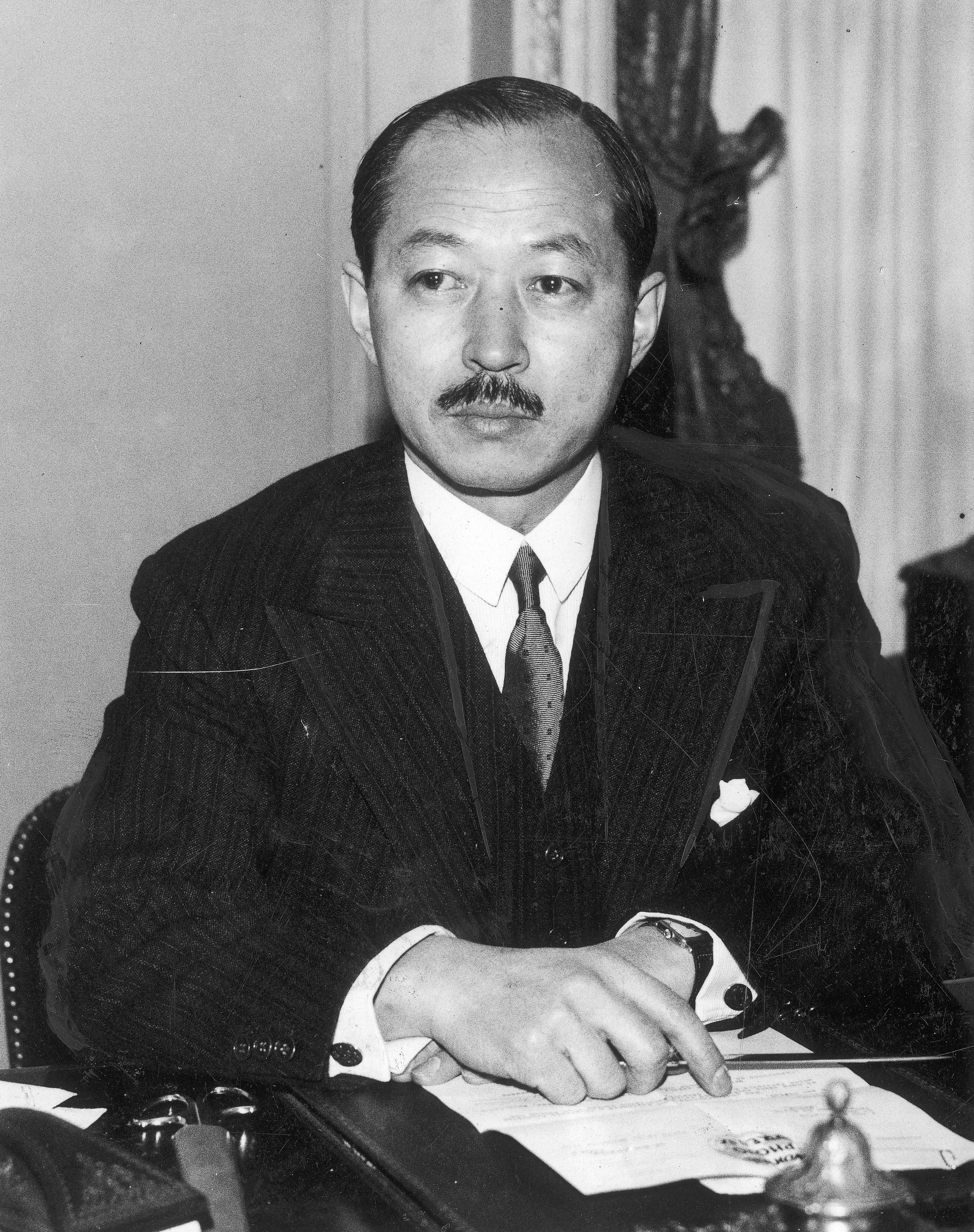

President of the House of Councillors
- In office 15 November 1949 – 19 May 1953
- Monarch: Hirohito
- Vice President: Kisaku Matsushima; Jirō Miki
- Preceded by: Tsuneo Matsudaira
- Succeeded by: Yahachi Kawai

Minister for Foreign Affairs
- In office 3 March 1937 – 4 June 1937
- Prime Minister: Senjūrō Hayashi
- Preceded by: Senjūrō Hayashi
- Succeeded by: Kōki Hirota

Member of the House of Councillors
- In office 3 May 1947 – 1 June 1965
- Preceded by: Constituency established
- Succeeded by: Bunji Tsushima
- Constituency: Aomori at-large

Personal details
- Born: 30 October 1882 Osaka, Japan
- Died: 18 December 1971 (aged 89) Tokyo, Japan
- Party: Independent (before 1947; 1960–1971)
- Other political affiliations: Ryokufūkai (1947–1960)
- Spouse: Fumi Satō
- Parent: Aimaro Satō (father)

Naotake Satō (佐藤 尚武, Satō Naotake; 30 October 1882 – 18 December 1971) was a Japanese diplomat and politician who served as President of the House of Councillors from 1949 to 1953.

He was a career diplomat who served as ambassador to Belgium and France in the 1930s. He briefly served as foreign minister under Prime Minister Senjuro Hayashi in 1937. He then served as ambassador to Italy and later to the Soviet Union, holding the latter position during most of the Second World War. After the war he was elected to the House of Councillors and served as its president.

== Early life and education ==
Naotake Satō was born on 30 October 1882, in Osaka. He graduated from the Tokyo Higher Commercial School (東京高等商業学校, Tōkyō Kōtō Shōgyō Gakkō; now Hitotsubashi University) in 1904, attended the consul course of the same institute, and finished studying there in 1905. That same year he passed the Foreign Service exam and started to work at the Ministry of Foreign Affairs.

== Career ==
After serving as Mukden Consul General and executive secretary of the London Naval Treaty, he served as Imperial Japan's Ambassador to Belgium in 1930 and to France in 1933. He became Minister of Foreign Affairs (Senjūrō Hayashi Cabinet) in March 1937, and resigned in June 1937, then was assigned as adviser to the Ministry of Foreign Affairs. He was ambassador to Italy in 1940.

He served from 1942 as the last Imperial Japanese Ambassador to the Soviet Union before the Soviet invasion of Manchuria, upon the request of the Minister of Foreign Affairs, Shigenori Tōgō. As Minister, he worked hard to avert war at the Imperial Diet. One of his missions as Japan's Ambassador to the USSR was to seek peace with the Allies through the assistance of the Soviets due to Soviet–Japanese Neutrality Pact.

However, Satō judged and reported to Tokyo that it was unlikely that the Soviets would assist Japan, because it was highly likely that Japan would lose the war, and urged an end to the war as early as possible. On 8 August 1945, he was invited to the Kremlin by the Soviet Foreign Minister, Vyacheslav Molotov, and received the Soviet declaration of war against Imperial Japan.

After the war, he was elected to the House of Councillors of the National Diet of Japan in 1947, and served as a President of the House of Councillors from 1949 to 1953.

He died on 18 December 1971, in Tokyo.

House of Councillors
New title	Chairman of the Committee on Foreign Affairs; 1947–1949	Succeeded by Shunsaku Noda
Preceded by Tsuneo Matsudaira	President of the House of Councillors; 1949–1953	Succeeded by Yahachi Kawai
Preceded by Yorisada Tokugawa	Chairman of the Committee on Foreign Affairs; 1953–1954	Succeeded by Tadaatsu Ishiguro
Party political offices
Preceded by Senjuro Hayashi	Minister for Foreign Affairs; 1937	Succeeded by Kōki Hirota
Diplomatic posts
Preceded by Yoshitsugu Tatekawa	Ambassador to the Soviet Union; 1942–1945	Soviet declaration of War
Preceded by Eiji Amō	Ambassador to Italy; 1940	Succeeded by Zenbei Horikiri
Preceded by Harukazu Nagaoka	Ambassador to France; 1933–1935	Succeeded by Yōtarō Sugimura
Preceded by Matsuzo Nagai	Ambassador to Belgium; 1931–1933	Succeeded by Hachirō Arita
