= Isamu Chō =

Imperial Japanese Army lieutenant general (1895–1945)

- 長 勇
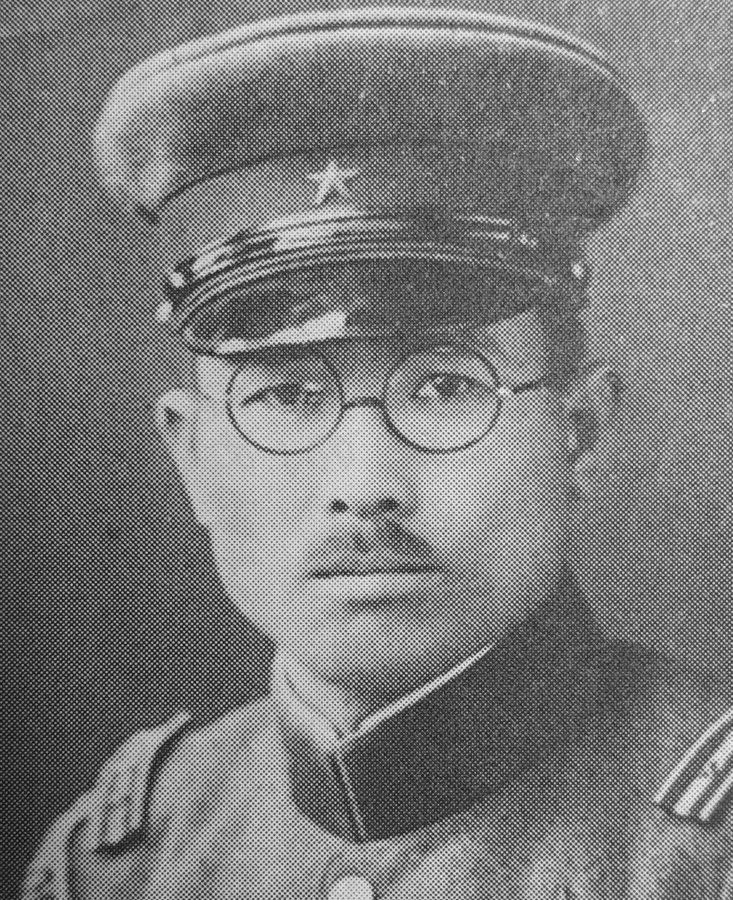
- Born: January 19, 1895; Fukuoka, Japan
- Died: 22 June 1945 (aged 50); Okinawa, Japan
- Education: Imperial Japanese Army Academy; Army Staff College
- Military career
- Allegiance: Empire of Japan
- Branch: Imperial Japanese Army
- Service years: 1913–1945
- Rank: Lieutenant general
- Units: Kwantung Army, Sakurakai, Shanghai Expeditionary Force, Taiwan Army of Japan Headquarters
- Commands: IJA 74th Infantry Regiment; 10th Infantry Division
- Conflicts: Second Sino-Japanese War; Battle of Nanjing; World War II; Battle of Okinawa ‡‡
- Other work: Co-founder of Sakurakai

Isamu Chō (長 勇, Chō Isamu; 19 January 1895 – 22 June 1945) was a lieutenant general in the Imperial Japanese Army known for his support of ultranationalist politics and involvement in a number of attempted coup d'états in pre-World War II Japan.

== Biography ==
Chō was a native of Fukuoka prefecture. He graduated from the Imperial Japanese Army Academy in 1913 and from the Army Staff College in 1928.

After he received his commission, Chō was assigned to his first duty outside Japan with the politicized Kwantung Army based in eastern China. He returned to play a very active role in internal politics within the Japanese army, and was an active participant in the March Incident and the Imperial Colors Incident along with Kingoro Hashimoto. He and Hashimoto were the co-founders of the radical "Sakurakai" secret society, whose aim was to overthrow the democratic government in favor of a totalitarian regime which would stamp out corruption. Chō was known to be quick to anger and often struck his subordinates.

At the start of the Second Sino-Japanese War, Chō was commander of the IJA 74th Infantry Regiment of the Shanghai Expeditionary Force, attached to Japanese Central China Area Army, and based in Manchukuo. At the Battle of Nanjing, he was aide-de-camp to Prince Asaka and is thought to have been complicit in ordering the Nanjing Massacre, but it is disputed whether he obeyed an order from the prince, or whether he acted on his own.

Chō was subsequently involved in a number of border incidents between Manchukuo and the Soviet Union as Chief of Staff of the IJA 26th Division from 1939 to 1940. In 1940 he was transferred briefly to the Taiwan Army of Japan Headquarters, and then became Chief of Staff of the Indochina Expeditionary Army from 1940 to 1941.

Chō was Vice Chief of Staff of Unit 82 within the Military Affairs Bureau, in the Ministry of War in 1941, and participated in the strategic and tactical planning for the Japanese invasion of Southeast Asia.

From 1942 until 1944 Chō was commander of the 10th Infantry Group (Dai 10 Hohei-Dan(第10歩兵団)) of the IJA 10th Division, a garrison force based in Manchukuo. He served in the Kwantung Army Headquarters, and later as commander of the 1st Mobile Brigade. In late 1944, Chō was recalled from Manchuria to the Home Islands, then to Okinawa.

=== Okinawa ===
He was Chief of Staff of the 32nd Army during the Battle of Okinawa. He masterminded the elaborate underground fortifications around Shuri Castle, but favored a highly aggressive response to the American invasion rather than a passive defense. He persuaded General Mitsuru Ushijima to launch the disastrous 5 May 1945 counteroffensive.

By the middle of June, the 32nd Army was effectively reduced to occupying two strongpoints, one beneath Kunishi Ridge and the other, the command headquarters inside Hill 89.

Cho’s personal driver, Houhei Arakaki who was former local bus driver/shop owner was dismissed after the 32nd Army moved to the southern part of Okinawa. Arakaki was reunited with his family and escaped to the south but shot to death by an American soldier on 26 June. Arakaki was 40 years old.

Ushijima and Cho had decided to commit seppuku (ritual suicide) and on the night of their planned departure held a banquet in the cave housing the command post with a large meal prepared by Ushijima's cook, Tetsuo Nakamutam, which was complemented with plenty of sake and Cho's remaining stock of captured Black & White Scotch whisky.

Later in the early hours of 22 June the staff in the command post lined up to pay their respects to Ushijima who was attired in his full dress uniform and Cho who wore a white kimono. Cho volunteered to go first and lead the way, “as the way may be dark,” but Ushijima insisted on going first. The men made their way onto an outside ledge overlooking the ocean, on which a white cloth had been laid over a quilt. Handed a knife by an aide Ushijima shouted and made a deep vertical cut in his bared abdomen before Captain Sakaguchi (who was regarded as a master swordsman) decapitated him with his sword. Cho followed Ushijima and the bodies of both men were buried by three orderlies in shallow graves. Their bodies were then buried under U.S. military auspices on 27 June 1945, near the cave where they died. "The bodies of the two Japanese generals were lowered into graves almost above their cave headquarters which was sealed during the American flag service."

On the back of Cho's kimono was a poem that he had composed:

“With bravery I served my nation.
With loyalty I dedicate my life.”

== Bibliography ==
- Dupuy, Trevor N. (1992). Encyclopedia of Military Biography. I B Tauris & Co Ltd. ISBN 1-85043-569-3.
- Fukagawa, Hideki (1981). (陸海軍将官人事総覧 (陸軍篇)) Army and Navy General Personnel Directory (Army). Tokyo: Fuyo Shobo. ISBN 4829500026.
- Hata, Ikuhiko (2005). (日本陸海軍総合事典) Japanese Army and Navy General Encyclopedia. Tokyo: St. Martin's Press. ISBN 4130301357.
- Hayashi, Saburo; Cox, Alvin (1959). Kogun: The Japanese Army in the Pacific War. Quantico, VA: The Marine Corps Association.
