= Yatabe Domain =

Motegi Domain (1600-1616) 茂木藩 Yatabe Domain (1616–1871) 谷田部藩
- Domain of Japan
- 1616–1871
- Capital: Yatabe jin'ya (1616–1871); Motegi jin'ya (1871)
  - Type: Daimyō
- Historical era: Edo period
  - Established: 1616
  - Disestablished: 1871
- Today part of: Ibaraki Prefecture; Tochigi Prefecture

Yatabe Domain (谷田部藩, Yatabe-han) was a feudal domain under the Tokugawa shogunate of Edo period Japan, located in Hitachi Province (modern-day Ibaraki Prefecture), Japan. It was centered on Yatabe Jin'ya in what is now part of the city of Tsukuba, Ibaraki. It was ruled for all of its history by a junior branch of the Hosokawa clan.

== History ==
Hosokawa Okimoto was the second son of Hosokawa Fujitaka, a noted retainer of the Ashikaga shōguns. He was awarded Tango Province by Oda Nobunaga, and his eldest son Hosokawa Tadaoki was one of the main generals of the Sengoku period and a close ally of Tokugawa Ieyasu. After the Battle of Sekigahara, Hosokawa Okimoto was awarded a minor fief 10,000 koku in Shimotsuke Province (Motegi Domain). This was only a tenth the size of the large domain in Kyushu awarded to his elder brother, with whom he had very strained relations. In 1616, for his participation in the Siege of Osaka, Okimoto was awarded an additional 6200 koku in Hitachi Province. He transferred his seat from Motegi to Yatabe, and this marked the start of Yatabe Domain. The domain consisted mostly of waste lands which were unsuited for agriculture, and from the beginning the domain was in a difficult financial situation with frequent famines. All requests for assistance to the wealthy Kumamoto Domain ruled by his brother and brother’s descendants were ignored.

Despite these problems, this branch of the Hosokawa clan continued at Yatabe until the Meiji restoration. The year 1660 under the rule of Hosokawa Okitaka was especially hard, with unusually heavy rains leading to flooding, crop failure, and pestilence, combined with a fire which burned down the domain’s Edo residence. Another difficult period was in the 1830s. The domain had accumulated enormous debts by 1834 and could no longer find credit. Increasing taxes lead to peasant uprisings, and the population decreased precipitously from 1835 to less than half its former levels, resulting in large areas of lands with not enough peasants to cultivate. The 8th daimyō, Hosokawa Okinori turned to the writing of Ninomiya Sontoku in a desperate attempt to turn the situation around. However, his efforts at radical reforms met with strong resistance, and he died in frustration after a short tenure of only three years. The shogunate was forced to intervene, and ordered Kumamoto Domain to support Yatabe to prevent its bankruptcy. This situation continued through the end of the Tokugawa shogunate. During the Boshin War, the domain was an early supporter of the Imperial cause, and sent troops to fight in the Battle of Aizu.

The domain had a total population of 13,425 people in 2605 households per a census in 1869, of which 448 people in 107 households were classed as samurai and 232 people in 147 households were classed as ashigaru.

== Holdings at the end of the Edo period ==
As with most domains in the han system, Yatabe Domain consisted of several discontinuous territories calculated to provide the assigned kokudaka, based on periodic cadastral surveys and projected agricultural yields. In the case of the Hosokawa, their holdings were divided between Hitachi and Shimotsuke provinces.

- Hitachi Province
  - 22 villages in Kawachi District
  - 20 villages in Tsukuba District
  - 1 village in Niihari District
- Shimotsuke Province
  - 27 villages in Haga District

== List of daimyō ==
#	Name	Tenure	Courtesy title	Court Rank	kokudaka
Hosokawa clan (tozama) 1616-1871
1	Hosokawa Okimoto (細川 興元)	1616-1619	Genba-no-kami (玄蕃頭)	Lower 5th (従五位下)	16,200 koku
2	Hosokawa Okimasa (細川 興昌)	1619-1643	Genba-no-kami (玄蕃頭)	Lower 5th (従五位下)	16,200 koku
3	Hosokawa Okitaka (細川 興隆)	1643-1689	Buzen-no-kami (豊前守)	Lower 5th (従五位下)	16,200 koku
4	Hosokawa Okinaga (細川 興栄)	1689-1728	Nagato-no-kami (長門守)	Lower 5th (従五位下)	16,200 koku
5	Hosokawa Okitora (細川 興虎)	1728-1737	Genba-no-kami (玄蕃頭)	Lower 5th (従五位下)	16,200 koku
6	Hosokawa Okiharu (細川 興晴)	1737-1788	Genba-no-kami (玄蕃頭)	Lower 5th (従五位下)	16,200 koku
7	Hosokawa Okinori (細川 興徳)	1788-1837	Nagato-no-kami (長門守)	Lower 5th (従五位下)	16,200 koku
8	Hosokawa Okitatsu (細川 興建)	1837-1852	Nagato-no-kami (長門守)	Lower 5th (従五位下)	16,200 koku
9	Hosokawa Akitsura (細川 興貫)	1852-1870	Genba-no-kami (玄蕃頭)	Lower 5th (従五位下)	16,200 koku
