= Great Japan Youth Party =

Nationalist youth organization in Japanese Empire (1937–1945)

Great Japan Youth Party 大日本青年党 Dai-Nippon Seinen-tō
- Leader: Colonel Kingoro Hashimoto
- Founded: October 17, 1937
- Dissolved: 1945
- Headquarters: Tokyo, Empire of Japan
- Ideology: Fascism (Japanese)
- Position: Far-right
- Mother party: Imperial Rule Assistance Association (from 1940)

Flag

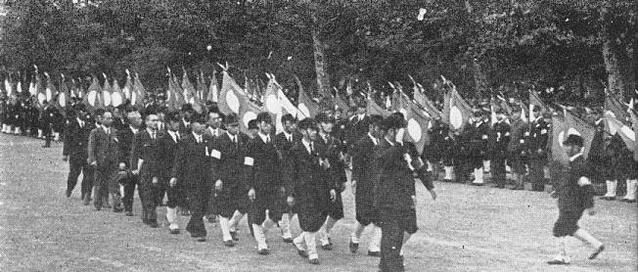
Rally of Great Japan Youth Party in 1940

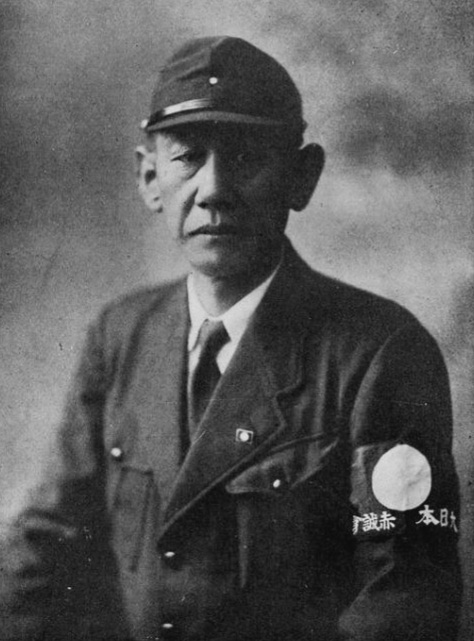
Colonel Kingoro Hashimoto wearing the Youth Party armband

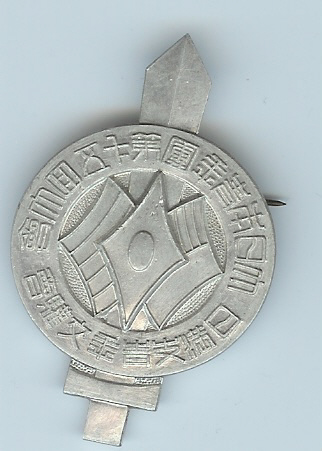
Pin from 15th meeting of Great Japan Youth Party

The Great Japan Youth Party (大日本青年党, Dai-Nippon Seinen-tō), later known as the Great Japan Sincerity Association (大日本赤誠会, Dai Nippon Sekisei-kai), was a nationalist youth organization in the Empire of Japan modeled after Nazi Germany's Hitler Youth. It was active from 1937 until its dissolution in 1945.

== History ==
The Dai-Nippon Seinento was a youth organization founded by ultranationalist activist Colonel Kingoro Hashimoto on October 17, 1937, following Hashimoto's temporary forced retirement from military service due to his involvement in the failed February 26 attempted coup d'etat against the government.

Hashimoto modeled the organization after the Hitler Youth of Nazi Germany, even to the extent of using a light brown color for member's uniforms, and the adoption of a red banner with a white circle in the center as the party banner. The first party rally was held on the grounds of Meiji Shrine in downtown Tokyo, with approximately 600 members.

During the third party rally, held in Hibiya Park, Tokyo with some 2000 members in November 1939, Hashimoto expressed his support for the upcoming Tripartite Alliance with Nazi Germany and Fascist Italy, and for a one-party system of government in Japan. He also set the ambitious goal of growing party membership to 100,000 members by the end of 1940.

However, with increased military conscription due to the Second Sino-Japanese War and subsequently with the Pacific War, most of his target age group was being drafted into the Japanese military, and the party fell far short of its goals. Although not specifically a "political party" per se, the Great Japan Youth Party fell under the overall aegis of the Imperial Rule Assistance Association organized by Prime Minister Fumimaro Konoe from October 1940.

Unable to achieve his goals in Japan, and sidelined by actions of the government, Hashimoto returned to Manchukuo in late 1940, where he attempted to create another local youth organization similar to the Great Japan Youth Party among the Japanese settler population, with an equal lack of success.

By the end of World War II, the Great Japan Youth Party had devolved into little more than a defunct youth wing of the Imperial Rule Assistance Association, and was dissolved along with that organization by order of the American occupation authorities.

== See also ==
- Himeyuri Students
- Tonarigumi
- Volunteer Fighting Corps
