= Ugaki Kazushige =

Japanese general (1868–1956)

Senior Second Rank Ugaki Kazushige
- 宇垣 一成
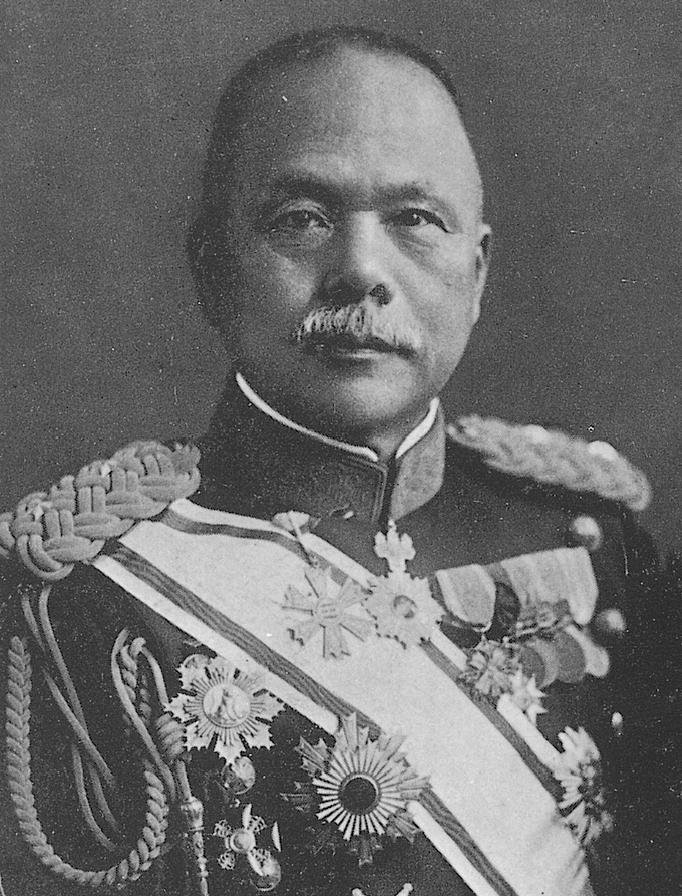
- Ugaki as Army Minister (1924)

Minister for Foreign Affairs
- In office 26 May 1938 – 30 September 1938
- Prime Minister: Fumimaro Konoe
- Preceded by: Hirota Kōki
- Succeeded by: Hachirō Arita

Minister of Colonial Affairs
- In office 26 May 1938 – 30 September 1938
- Prime Minister: Fumimaro Konoe
- Preceded by: Sonyu Ōtani
- Succeeded by: Fumimaro Konoe

Governor-General of Korea
- In office 17 June 1931 – 5 August 1936
- Monarch: Hirohito
- Preceded by: Saitō Makoto
- Succeeded by: Jirō Minami

Acting Governor-General of Korea
- In office 15 April 1927 – 1 October 1927
- Monarch: Hirohito
- Preceded by: Saitō Makoto
- Succeeded by: Saitō Makoto

Minister of the Army
- In office 2 July 1929 – 14 April 1931
- Prime Minister: Osachi Hamaguchi
- Preceded by: Yoshinori Shirakawa
- Succeeded by: Jirō Minami
- In office 7 January 1924 – 20 April 1927
- Prime Minister: Keigo Kiyoura; Katō Takaaki; Wakatsuki Reijirō
- Preceded by: Giichi Tanaka
- Succeeded by: Yoshinori Shirakawa

Member of the House of Councillors
- In office 3 May 1953 – 30 April 1956
- Constituency: National district

Personal details
- Born: 9 August 1868 Okayama, Bizen, Japan
- Died: 30 April 1956 (aged 87) Izunagaoka, Shizuoka, Japan
- Party: Independent
- Education: Imperial Japanese Army Academy
- Alma mater: Army Staff College

Military service
- Allegiance: Empire of Japan
- Branch/service: Japanese Army
- Years of service: 1891–1931
- Rank: General
- Battles/wars: Russo-Japanese War

Ugaki Kazushige (宇垣 一成; 9 August 1868 – 30 April 1956) was a Japanese general in the Imperial Japanese Army and cabinet minister before World War II, the 5th principal of Takushoku University, and twice Governor-General of Korea. Nicknamed Ugaki Issei, he served as Minister for Foreign Affairs in the Konoe cabinet in 1938.

== Early life and education ==
Ugaki was the fifth son of an impoverished farming family in Ochi village, Bizen Province (currently the town of Seto, Okayama). He excelled in all studies, and passed a teacher recruitment examination. He worked as an elementary school teacher in his teens, moved to Tokyo, and managed to secure a position at the first class of the reformed Imperial Japanese Army Academy. He graduated in 1891 ranked 11th out of a class of 150. In 1900, he graduated from the Army Staff College, ranked 3rd out of a class of 39 and was awarded a sword of merit.

== Military career ==
Ugaki became a protege of General Kawakami Soroku as a captain and was sent as military attaché to Germany from 1902 to 1904, and again from 1906 to 1907. Ugaki also was a protege of general Tanaka Giichi, under whom he was promoted to colonel in 1910 and major general in 1915. He was chief of the 1st Bureau of the Imperial Japanese Army General Staff in 1916 and was promoted to Lieutenant General in 1919. He served as commandant of the Army Staff College from 1919 to 1921 and became commander of the Himeji-based IJA 10th Division from March 1921 to May 1922. From October 1923, he served as Vice Minister of the Army.

== Political career ==
=== Army Minister and Governor-General of Korea ===
In January 1924, Ugaki was appointed Army Minister by Prime Minister Keigo Kiyoura. He continued in this post in the Katō Takaaki and the first Reijirō Wakatsuki cabinets until April 1927. The political machinations of the Rikken Seiyukai political party and his mentor, Tanaka Giichi, were behind his appointment.

Ugaki strove to protect the superior position of the Imperial Japanese Army in Japanese politics, fearing a loss of influence to the Imperial Japanese Navy, should the United States be judged "Hypothetical National Enemy No. 1". Ugaki's plans called for an Army of 50 divisions. Nevertheless, despite Ugaki's strenuous opposition, the Katō Takaaki cabinet continued with its fiscal retrenchment policy (from May 1925) and Ugaki was forced to eliminate four infantry divisions (the IJA 13th Division, IJA 15th Division, IJA 17th Division, and IJA 18th Division), which resulted in the release of approximately 2,000 commissioned officers. He was also forced to shorten the period of time conscripts served with the remaining divisions and to force many senior officers into early retirement. The fact that the monies saved by these policies were used to implement modernization of military equipment and training had little impact on Ugaki's unpopularity within the Army. Under these circumstances, Ugaki declined to continue as army minister when Wakatsuki was replaced by Tanaka Giichi in April 1927.

Ugaki instead accepted a posting as acting Governor-General of Korea, while Saitō Makoto was participating as plentipotentiary in the Geneva Naval Conference. He held this position until Saitō returned in October. Ugaki hoped to succeed Saitō permanently, but Tanaka Giichi nominated General Yamanashi Hanzō instead.

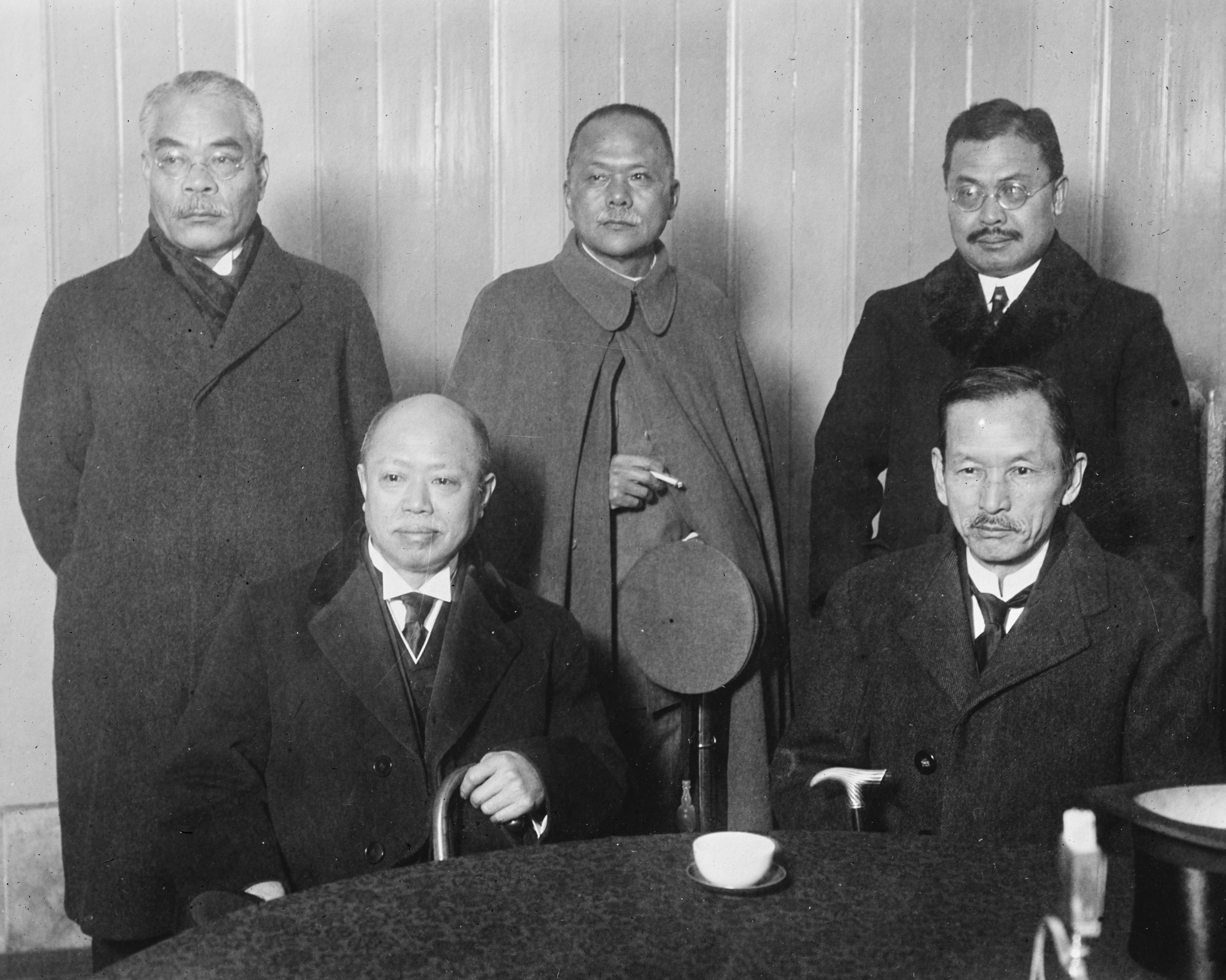
Hamaguchi Osachi, Ogawa Heikichi, Ugaki Kazushige (left to right), Shidehara Kijūrō (standing far right), Okada Ryōhei (seated far right) on 19 December 1929

In 1929, Ugaki was promoted to full general. Under Prime Minister Hamaguchi Osachi, he agreed to return as Army Minister in July 1929. However, the failure of Hamaguchi's economic policies after the start of the Great Depression and his push for demilitarization with the London Naval Treaty of 1930 enraged right-wing ultranationists. In 1931, although Ugaki refused to cooperate with them, he also failed to punish the insurgents responsible for the March Incident, an attempted coup-d'etat by young officers of the Sakurakai who sought to make him Prime Minister. Having lost the support of his fellow officers, Ugaki resigned from the military in April 1931 and once again accepted a posting as Governor-General of Korea.

During his second period in Korea, from June 1931 to August 1936, Ugaki made concentrated efforts to build up the industrial base in the Korean peninsula, especially in the areas of heavy industry and munitions, which he felt would be invaluable in an upcoming war with China, which he considered unavoidable in the near future. He also promoted a policy of reconciliation which was in stark contrast to the more repressive regimes before and after his administration.

=== Almost Prime Minister ===
Recalled to Japan after the fall of the Hirota Kōki administration, Ugaki was named Prime Minister in February 1937, but was unable to form a Cabinet due to strong opposition from his political enemies within the Army. Ugaki was highly regarded by Saionji Kinmochi and was perceived as having a moderate foreign policy and being opposed to the increasingly fascistic trends within the military. The situation in Japan had become highly unstable, with increasing international isolation following the withdrawal from the League of Nations, lack of economic recovery and increasing distrust of politicians due to constant corruption scandals, and terrorist attacks by elements of the Army itself. After the February 26 Incident in 1936, the Japanese military had obtained a restoration of the requirement that the Army and Navy Ministers must be selected only from active duty officers. Ugaki, although Prime Minister-designate (and a retired full general in his own right) remained a persona non grata with the Army leadership over his previous terms as Army Minister and over the March Incident, along with his alleged ties to the zaibatsu businesses over the Korean industrialization program, so they refused to provide him with the position of Army Minister. As a consequence, although officially appointed, Ugaki could never assume office. The post of prime minister then went to Senjūrō Hayashi, a general close to the Tōseiha faction.

The Imperial Japanese Army's ability to control the formation of a government by means of withholding nomination of a cabinet minister was a staggering blow to the evolution of parliamentary government and democracy in Japan and unquestionably, the decisive factor in the military supremacy over civilian authority before and during World War II.

=== Subsequent career ===
In May 1938, Ugaki accepted the post of Foreign Minister under the first Konoe administration, simultaneously holding the portfolio of Minister of Colonial Affairs, but resigned after only four months. Ugaki had been requested by Konoe for assistance to negotiate a peace settlement with the Republic of China following the Marco Polo Bridge incident to avoid an all-out war. Ugaki enlisted the aid of British and American ambassadors to open a direct negotiation with Chinese premier H. H. Kung; however, his efforts were quickly undercut by the Japanese Army, who applied pressure onto Konoe that the military and not a civilian military should be responsible for all negotiations. Konoe wavered between positions and finally sided with the military, and Ugaki resigned in protest.

Ugaki was the center of a movement which supported a quick end to World War II, and from 1943 was active in efforts to oust Prime Minister Hideki Tojo from office. In 1944, Ugaki accepted the post of president of Takushoku University, which he held throughout the remainder of the war years.

After World War II, along with all former members of the Japanese government, Ugaki was purged from public service and arrested by the American Occupation authorities. However, he was never charged with any war crimes.

In 1953, Ugaki ran for public office on a national ticket and was elected to the House of Councillors in the post-war Diet of Japan with an overwhelming vote. Ugaki died in 1956 at his summer villa in Izunokuni, Shizuoka.

== Decorations ==
- 1902 – Order of the Sacred Treasure, 5th class
- 1906 – Order of the Golden Kite, 4th class
- 1915 – Order of the Rising Sun, 4th class
- 1918 – Order of the Sacred Treasure, 3rd class
- 1920 – Order of the Rising Sun, 2nd class
- 1924 – Grand Cordon of the Order of the Sacred Treasure
- 1927 – Grand Cordon of the Order of the Rising Sun

Political offices
| Preceded by Giichi Tanaka | Army Minister; 1924–1926 | Succeeded by Yoshinori Shirakawa |
| Preceded by Makoto Saito | Japanese Governor-General of Korea; 1927 | Succeeded by Hanzō Yamanashi |
| Preceded by Yoshinori Shirakawa | Army Minister; 1929–1931 | Succeeded by Jirō Minami |
| Preceded by Makoto Saito | Japanese Governor-General of Korea; 1931–1936 | Succeeded by Jirō Minami |
| Preceded by Hirota Kōki | Minister for Foreign Affairs; 1938 | Succeeded by Hachirō Arita |
| Preceded by Sonyu Ōtani | Minister of Colonial Affairs; 1938 | Succeeded by Fumimaro Konoe |
Academic offices
| Preceded by Hidejirō Nagata | Principal of Takushoku University; 1944–1945 | Succeeded by Hiroshi Shimomura |
Honorary titles
| Preceded by Tenkō Nijita | Oldest member of the House of Councillors of Japan; 1953–1956 | Succeeded by Toyokazu Ishizaka |
