= October incident =

1931 aborative coup d'état in Japan

The October incident (十月事件, Jūgatsu Jiken), also known as the Imperial Colors incident (錦旗革命事件, Kinki Kakumei Jiken), was an abortive coup d'état attempt in the Empire of Japan on 21 October 1931, launched by the Sakurakai secret society within the Imperial Japanese Army, aided by civilian ultranationalist groups.

== Background and history ==
Having failed to replace the government with a totalitarian military dictatorship in the abortive coup d'état of the March Incident of March 1931, Lt. Col. Hashimoto Kingoro of the Sakurakai and his ultra-nationalist civilian supporters, including Ōkawa Shūmei, resolved to try again in October 1931.

Soon after the Japanese invasion of Manchuria by the Kwantung Army, without prior authorization from the Imperial Japanese Army General Staff Office and over the ongoing objections of the Japanese civilian government, Capt. Chō Isamu returned secretly to Japan (without orders) from North China to lead the plot to "prevent the government from squandering the fruits of our victory in Manchuria". He was able to recruit the support of 120 members of the Sakurakai, ten companies of troops from the Imperial Guards and ten bomber aircraft from the Imperial Japanese Navy.

The main elements of the plot included:

- Key statesmen and officials such as Prime Minister Wakatsuki Reijirō, Grand Chamberlain Saitō Makoto, Prince Saionji Kinmochi, Lord Keeper of the Privy Seal Makino Nobuaki and Foreign Minister Shidehara Kijūrō were to be assassinated.
- The Imperial Palace, Tokyo Metropolitan Police Headquarters, and other key government buildings were to be seized by troops loyal to the Sakurakai
- A new cabinet would be formed under the auspices of Gen. Araki Sadao, chief of the radical Imperial Way Faction. The new government would ban political parties, and would consolidate the recent territorial gains of Japan in Manchuria.
- The Emperor would be forced to accept this Shōwa Restoration even if under threat of violence.

However, younger elements within the conspiracy came to doubt their leaders and seceded from the plot. In addition, there were leaks that reached War Minister Gen. Minami Jirō. He requested Gen. Araki Sadao to pacify the malcontents. Araki thereupon attempted to reason with Hashimoto and Chō, but they refused to abandon their scheme and Araki had them arrested by the Kempeitai—military police—on 17 October 1931.

The punishments for this abortive coup were even milder than for the previous March Incident, as Gen. Minami publicly excused the plot as simply an excess of patriotic zeal. Hashimoto was sentenced to 20 days house arrest, Chō to 10 days and the other ringleaders were simply transferred.

== Consequences ==
The October Incident, also known as the "Imperial Colors Incident", thus ended in apparent failure and resulted in the dissolution of the Sakurakai. However, the lightness of the punishments only encouraged more attempted military intervention in the government, culminating in the February 26 Incident of 1936.
