= March incident =

Failed 1931 coup in Japan

The March Incident (三月事件, Sangatsu Jiken) was an abortive coup d'état attempt in the Empire of Japan, in March 1931, launched by the radical Sakurakai secret society within the Imperial Japanese Army, aided by civilian ultranationalist groups.

== Background and history ==
The start of the March Incident of 1931 may be traced back to the autumn of 1930, with the foundation of the Sakurakai (Cherry Society) by Imperial Japanese Army Lt. Col. Hashimoto Kingoro and Capt. Chō Isamu. The cherry blossom was symbolic of self-sacrifice, and was a symbol used by the military to symbolize the fleeting life of a soldier. The avowed goal of the Sakurakai was political reform through elimination of corrupt party politics and the establishment of a totalitarian government run by the military. The new government would rid the country of corrupt politics, unfair distribution of wealth in the zaibatsu and perceived degenerative influences corrupting Japan's public morals.

After the attempted assassination of Prime Minister Hamaguchi Osachi, Prince Saionji Kinmochi (the last genrō) and Lord Privy Seal Makino Nobuaki considered recommending Gen. Ugaki Kazushige to the post of prime minister. However, they later decided that a civilian nominee would be best for Japan at that time. This change incensed the militarist party within the Imperial Japanese Army, and several leading generals called on Hashimoto and his Sakurakai to plan a coup d'état to bring Ugaki into power.

Hashimoto's plan involved a three-phase program:

1. Massive riots would be instigated in Tokyo, which would force the government to call out troops and proclaim martial law.
2. The Imperial Japanese Army would execute a coup d'état and seize power.
3. A new Cabinet would be formed under the premiership of the then-War Minister, General Ugaki Kazushige.

The project was underwritten by a 200,000-yen donation by Marquis Tokugawa Yoshichika, ultra-rightist member of the House of Peers, son of the last daimyō of Nagoya, founder of the Tokugawa Art Museum, Nagoya and Emperor Shōwa's second cousin.

Ultra-rightist civilian organizations led by Kamei Kan'ichirō and Ōkawa Shūmei fomented a commotion outside the Diet Building in Tokyo late in February 1931. However, due to logistical difficulties, the disturbance failed to attract enough people, and the hoped-for riot failed to occur. Hashimoto consulted Ōkawa, who wrote to Ugaki on 3 March explaining the plot and demanding the call-out of troops and action on the general’s part. Ugaki, either lukewarm from the start or having a change in heart after seeing the failure of the riot to take off, refused to cooperate. He had hopes of becoming head of the Rikken Minseitō party, and thus had a chance of becoming prime minister by legal means rather than a coup. It is also likely that Ugaki foresaw that a military dictatorship would alienate powerful sectors of the Japanese elite (bureaucrats, court nobles, zaibatsu industrialists, etc.) whose support he would need in case of a total war.

The plotters again attempted to start a riot on 17 March (two days before the planned coup d'état was to take place), but again the projected 10,000 rioters failed to materialize, the leaders were arrested, and the whole affair disintegrated.

== Consequences ==
Ugaki intervened to hush up the whole collapsed affair and ensured that the plotters received very mild punishments. This had the end result of encouraging more attempts by elements of the military to intervene in politics, and was also to taint Ugaki's bid for the office of prime minister in the future. Undeterred by his failure, Hashimoto attempted to overthrow the government again only seven months later in the Imperial Colors Incident of October 1931.
