= Sakurakai =

1930–31 far-right society in Japan

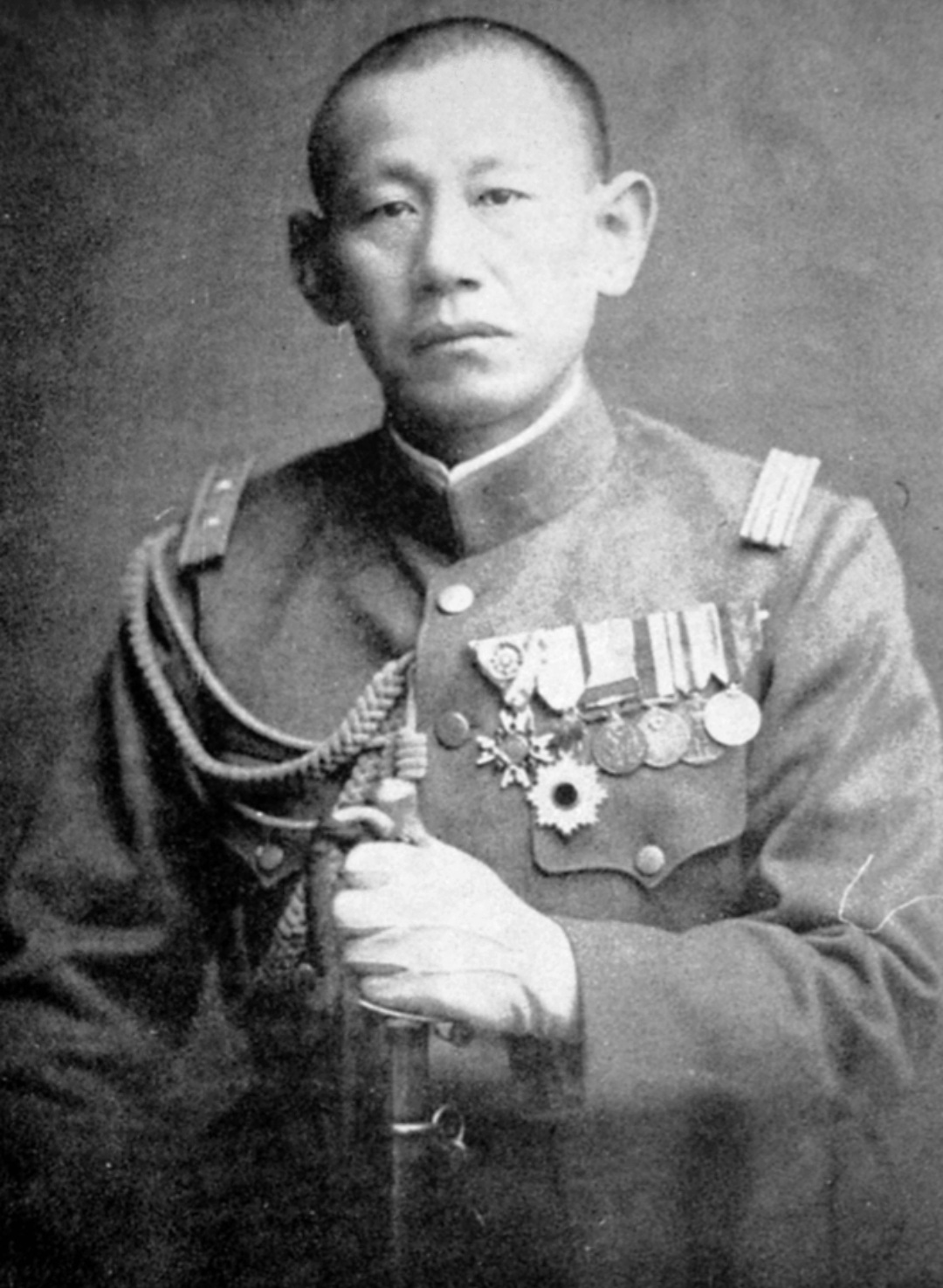
Lieutenant Colonel Hashimoto, founder of the Sakurakai

Sakurakai, or Cherry Blossom Society (桜会, Sakurakai), was an ultranationalist secret society established by young officers within the Imperial Japanese Army in September 1930, with the goal of reorganizing the state along totalitarian militarist lines via a military coup d'état, if necessary. Its avowed goal was a Shōwa Restoration, which they claimed would restore Emperor Shōwa to his rightful place, free of party politics and evil bureaucrats in a new military dictatorship. They also advocated for state socialism, according to the model proposed by Kita Ikki.

The Sakurakai was led by Imperial Japanese Army Lieutenant Colonel Kingoro Hashimoto, the chief of the Russian section of the Imperial Japanese Army General Staff, and Captain Isamu Chō. The society began with about ten members, active-duty field grade officers of the Army General Staff, and was expanded to include regimental-grade and company-grade officers. Its membership had increased to more than 50 by February 1931 and possibly up to several hundred by October 1931. One prominent leader was Kuniaki Koiso, future Prime Minister of Japan. Members of the Sakurakai held meetings in a dojo, led by the Aikido founder, Morihei Ueshiba, at the headquarters of the Oomoto religion in Ayabe.

The Sakura group sought political reform: the elimination of party government by a coup d'etat and the establishment of a new cabinet based upon state socialism, in order to stamp out Japan's allegedly corrupt politics, economy, and thought.

Twice in 1931 (the March Incident and the Imperial Colors Incident), the Sakurakai and civilian ultranationalist elements attempted to overthrow the government. With the arrest of its leadership after the Imperial Colors Incident, the Sakurakai was dissolved.

== See also ==
- Black Dragon Society
- Cherry blossom
- Dark Ocean Society
- Imperial Way Faction
- Japanese militarism
- Secret society
