= Kazuko Watanabe =

Japanese Catholic nun, educator, school administrator

Kazuko Watanabe 渡辺 和子
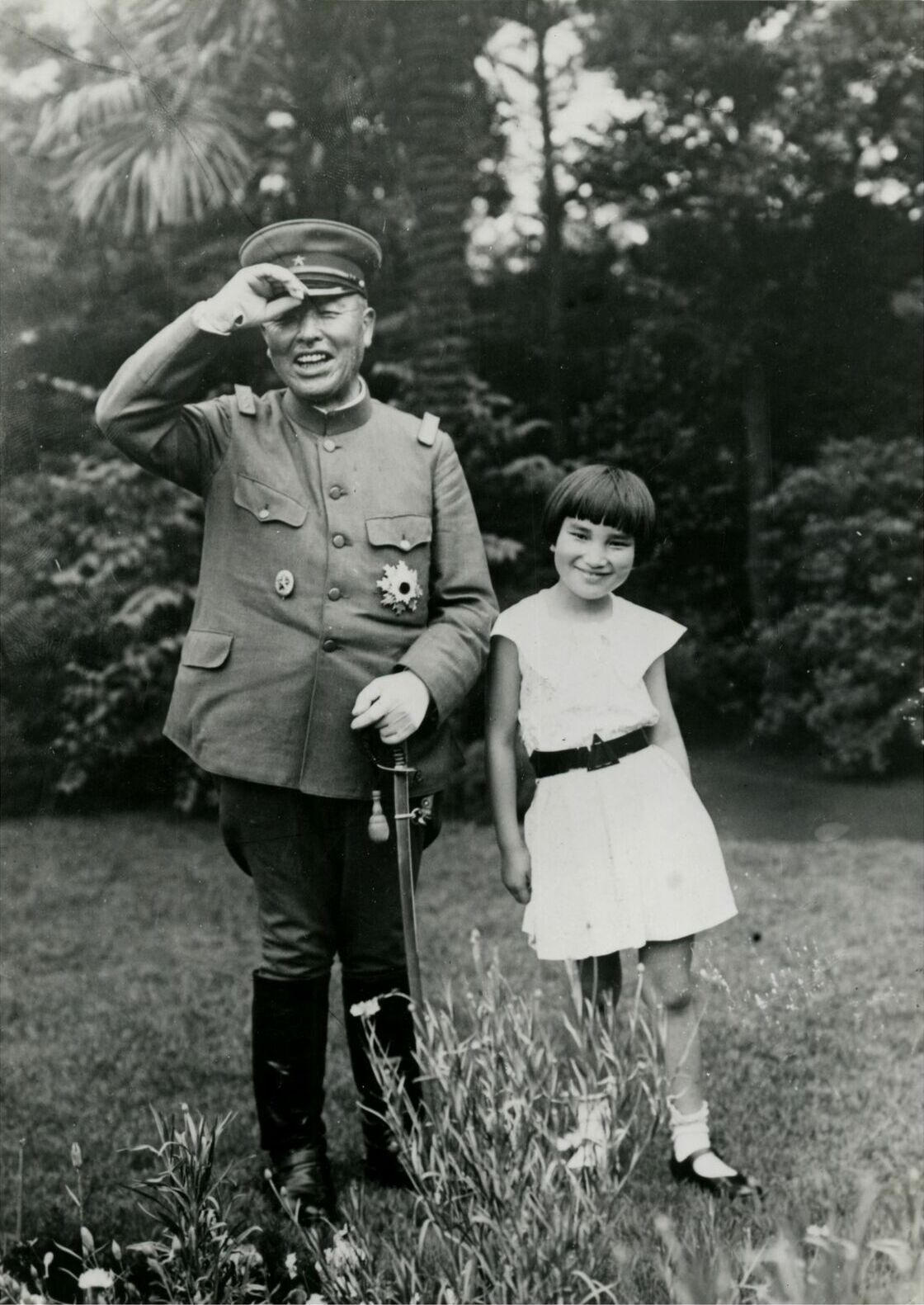
- Kazuko Watanabe and her father Jōtarō in the early 1930s
- Born: Kazuko Watanabe; February 11, 1927; Asahikawa, Japan
- Died: December 30, 2016 (aged 89)
- Education: Sophia University; Boston College
- Occupations: Catholic nun, educator, writer
- Writing career
- Period: 1927–2016
- Genre: Christianity

Kazuko Watanabe (Japanese: 渡辺 和子; February 11, 1927 – December 30, 2016) was a Japanese religious sister, educationist, and writer. Her Christian name was Sister Saint John. She was a member of the Sisters of Notre Dame de Namur and served as president of their Notre Dame Seishin University, Okayama Prefecture, from 1963 to 1990.

== Life and career ==
She was born in Asahikawa, Hokkaido, Japan in 1927. Her father was Jōtarō Watanabe, lieutenant-general of the army and a commander of Asahikawa 7th Division. He was 52 when she was born. She was the youngest of four siblings and the second oldest sister.

In 1936, when she was 9 years old, her father, general and educational commissioner at that time, was killed by young officers of a rebel group in the February 26 Incident. She was traumatized by having to watch as her father was mowed down by 43 bullets; the executioners standing one meter away.

In 1945 she was baptized into the Catholic church.

In 1951 she obtained a bachelor's degree from the University of the Sacred Heart, Tokyo.

In 1956 she joined the Sisters of Notre Dame de Namur in Hiroshima.

In 1962 she received her PhD (Philosophy) from Boston College. In September, she was appointed professor of Notre Dame Seishin University, Okayama.

In 1977 she was diagnosed with depression.

In 1981 her first book was printed. Since then, she has published 17 books, co-authored one, and translated another.

In 1984 she translated for Mother Teresa when the Holy Mother visited Japan.

In 1990 she was appointed honorary president of Notre Dame Seishin University and the administrative director of Notre Dame Seishin School.

From 1992 to 1996 she was the administrative director of the Japanese Federation of Catholic Schools.

In 1996 she visited the headquarters of the Order of Calcutta.

In 2012 her book Bloom Where You Are Planted (original title in Japanese) became a bestseller and sold more than two million copies.

On December 30, 2016, at the age of 89, she died of pancreatic cancer.
