= Takaji =

- Gender: Male

Origin
- Origin: Japanese
- Meaning: Different meanings depending on the kanji used

Takaji (written: 隆二, 鷹二, 孝次 or 孝慈) is a masculine Japanese given name. Notable people with the name include:

- Takaji Mori (森 孝慈; 1943–2011), Japanese footballer and manager
- Takaji Muranaka (村中 孝次; 1903–1937), Imperial Japanese Army officer
- Takaji Takebayashi (竹林 隆二; 1909–?), Japanese swimmer
- Takaji Wachi (和知 鷹二; 1893–1978), Japanese general

== See also ==
- 8907 Takaji, a main-belt asteroid
