= Kōhei Kashii =

Japanese general

- 香椎 浩平
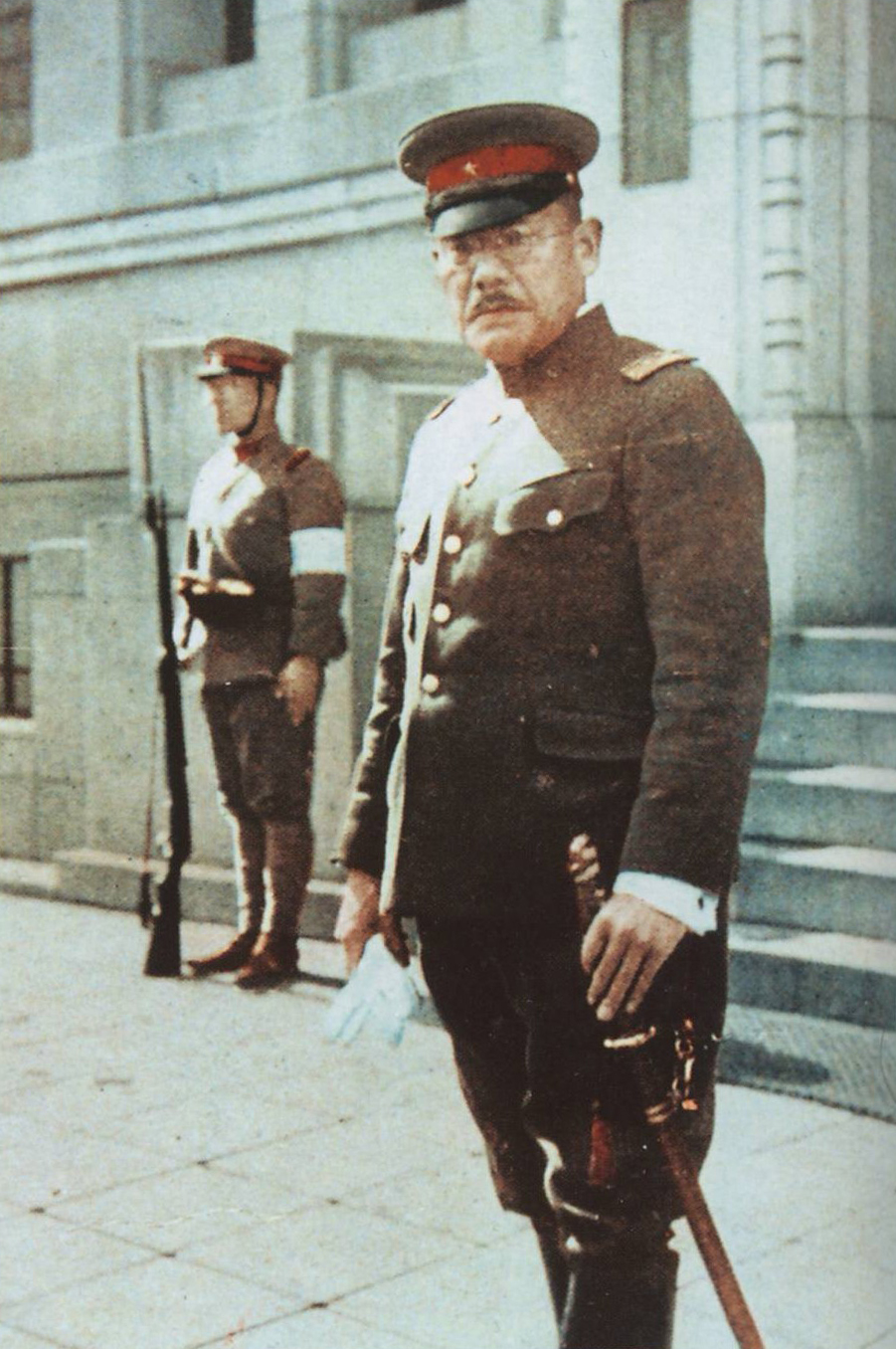
- Born: January 25, 1881; Fukuoka Prefecture, Japan
- Died: December 3, 1954 (aged 73); Fukuoka Prefecture, Japan
- Education: Imperial Japanese Army Academy
- Military career
- Allegiance: Empire of Japan
- Branch: Imperial Japanese Army
- Service years: 1901–1936
- Rank: Lieutenant General
- Commands: Japanese China Garrison Army
- Conflicts: February 26 Incident

Kōhei Kashii (香椎 浩平, Kashii Kōhei; January 25, 1881 – December 3, 1954) was a lieutenant-general in the Imperial Japanese Army.

Kashii was born in Fukuoka Prefecture, graduated from the Imperial Japanese Army Academy, and became a lieutenant-general in 1931. He was the commander of the Japanese China Garrison Army from 22 December 1930 to 29 February 1932. In November 1931, Kashii imposed martial law over the Japanese-ruled area of the Chinese city of Tianjin.

During the February 1936 coup attempt, Kashii was a leader of government forces that suppressed the revolt. Since he was sympathetic to the Imperial Way Faction, which included some of the officers who started the coup, he initially resisted military action against the revolt. He was later relieved of his duties, and then transferred to the reserves.
