= Shirō Nonaka =

Japanese Army officer (1903–1936)

- 野中 四郎
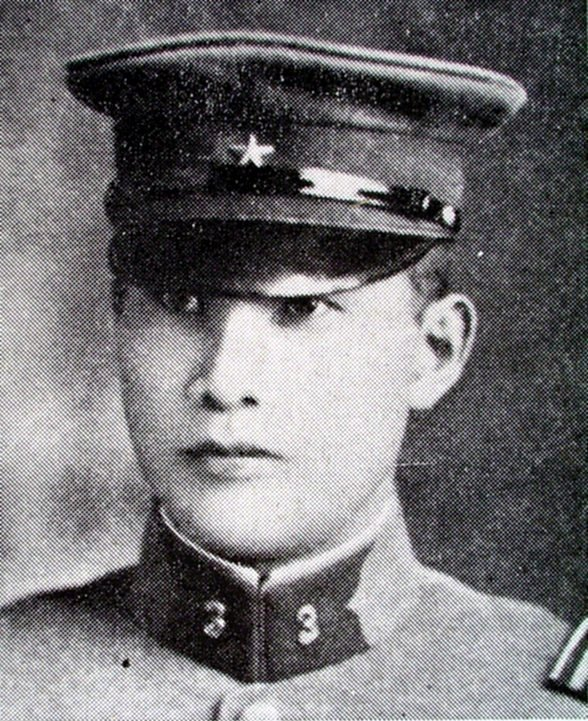
- Born: 27 October 1903; Okayama, Okayama Prefecture, Empire of Japan
- Died: 29 February 1936 (aged 32); Tokyo City, Tokyo Prefecture, Empire of Japan
- Military career
- Branch: Imperial Japanese Army
- Service years: 1924–1936
- Rank: Captain
- Conflicts: 26 February Incident ‡‡

Shirō Nonaka (野中 四郎, Nonaka Shirō; 27 October 1903 – 29 February 1936) was an Imperial Japanese Army officer who was a central conspirator in the 26 February Incident in 1936. His final rank was Captain.

== Career ==
Shirō Nonaka

Nonaka was born in the city of Okayama, in a family of career military officers. He enrolled in Tokyo Fourth Middle School (now Toyama High School in the Shinjuku City), and graduated in the 36th class of the Imperial Japanese Army Academy in 1924. Later, he became an Infantry Captain in 1933. During the February 26 Incident, he led 500 soldiers to take over Tokyo Metropolitan Police Department headquarters, but committed suicide on 29 February when the coup d'état failed.

== Portrayals ==
=== Film ===
- Eiichi Sugasawara (『叛乱]』, 1954, Shin Saburi)
- Asao Matsumoto (『重臣と青年将校 陸海軍流血史』, 1958, Michiyoshi Doi)
- Fumitake Omura (『銃殺 2・26の叛乱』, 1964, Tsuneo Kobayashi) (as "Captain Noda")
- Kenichi Hagiwara (『226』, 1989, Hideo Gosha)

=== Theatre ===
- Masaru Yamamoto (『狂騒昭和維新』, 1975)
- Ryuichi Onodera (『恋が散る、雪が舞う』, 2005)

== See also ==
- Showa Restoration
