= Teruzō Andō =

Imperial Japanese Army officer (1905–1936)

- 安藤 輝三
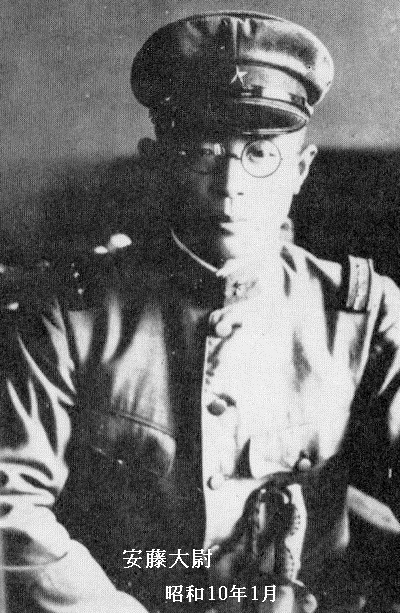
- Andō in 1935
- Born: 25 February 1905; Gifu, Japan
- Died: 12 July 1936 (aged 31); Tokyo, Japan
- Cause of death: Execution by firing squad
- Education: Sendai Army Cadet School; Imperial Japanese Army Academy
- Spouse: Fusako
- Children: 2
- Father: Eijiro Andō
- Military career
- Allegiance: Empire of Japan; Righteous Army
- Branch: Imperial Japanese Army
- Service years: 1926–1936
- Rank: Captain
- Unit: 3rd Infantry Regiment
- Commands: 6th Company
- Conflicts: February 26 incident (executed)

Teruzō Andō (安藤 輝三, Andō Teruzō; 25 February 1905 – 12 July 1936) was an Imperial Japanese Army military officer who participated in the February 26 incident of 1936.

== Biography ==
Teruzō Andō was born on 25 February 1905 in Gifu, Japan. His father, Eijiro Andō, was an English professor at Keio University. Andō practiced Nichiren Buddhism.

Andō attended the Utsunomiya Junior High School, the Sendai Army Cadet School, and the Imperial Japanese Army Academy. He graduated from the latter in July 1926 and became a second lieutenant in October. He was attached to the 3rd Infantry Regiment. He was promoted to first lieutenant in October 1929. Andō married Fusako in 1931 and the couple had two children. Andō was promoted to captain in August 1934. In January 1935, he was appointed as the commanding officer of the 6th Company, a part of the 3rd Infantry Regiment.

=== February 26 incident ===
Andō joined the Kōdō-ha-led February 26 incident, an attempted coup against the Japanese government. He was a member of a junior officers clique that sought to restore the power of Emperor Shōwa, but he was one of the last officers to go through with the coup.

Andō led 500 soldiers from the 3rd Infantry Regiment during the coup attempt. He ordered his soldiers to attack the home of Admiral Kantarō Suzuki, during which Suzuki was shot. Andō, at Suzuki's wife insistence, did not stab Suzuki with his sword and Suzuki ultimately survived the attack. After three days, Andō was the last of the coup leaders to dismiss his soldiers back to the barracks, occurring at 1 p.m. on 29 February, after which he attempted to commit suicide by shooting himself in the head; he survived.

Andō was discharged from the Imperial Japanese Army on 29 February after the coup's failure. He was court-martialed and subsequently executed by firing squad on 12 July 1936.

== See also ==
- Shōwa Restoration
