= Takaji Muranaka =

Japanese Army officer (1903–1937)

- 村中 孝次
- Born: 3 October 1903; Asahikawa, Hokkaido, Japan
- Died: 19 August 1937 (aged 33); Tokyo City, Tokyo Prefecture, Japan
- Cause of death: Execution by firing squad
- Military career
- Branch: Imperial Japanese Army
- Service years: 1922–1937
- Rank: Captain
- Conflicts: 26 February Incident

Takaji Muranaka (村中 孝次, Muranaka Takaji; 3 October 1903 – 19 August 1937) was an Imperial Japanese Army officer who was a conspirator in the February 26 Incident in 1936 and was subsequently arrested and executed by the Japanese authorities for the attempted coup.

== See also ==
- Showa Restoration
