= February 26 incident =

1936 coup d'état attempt in Japan

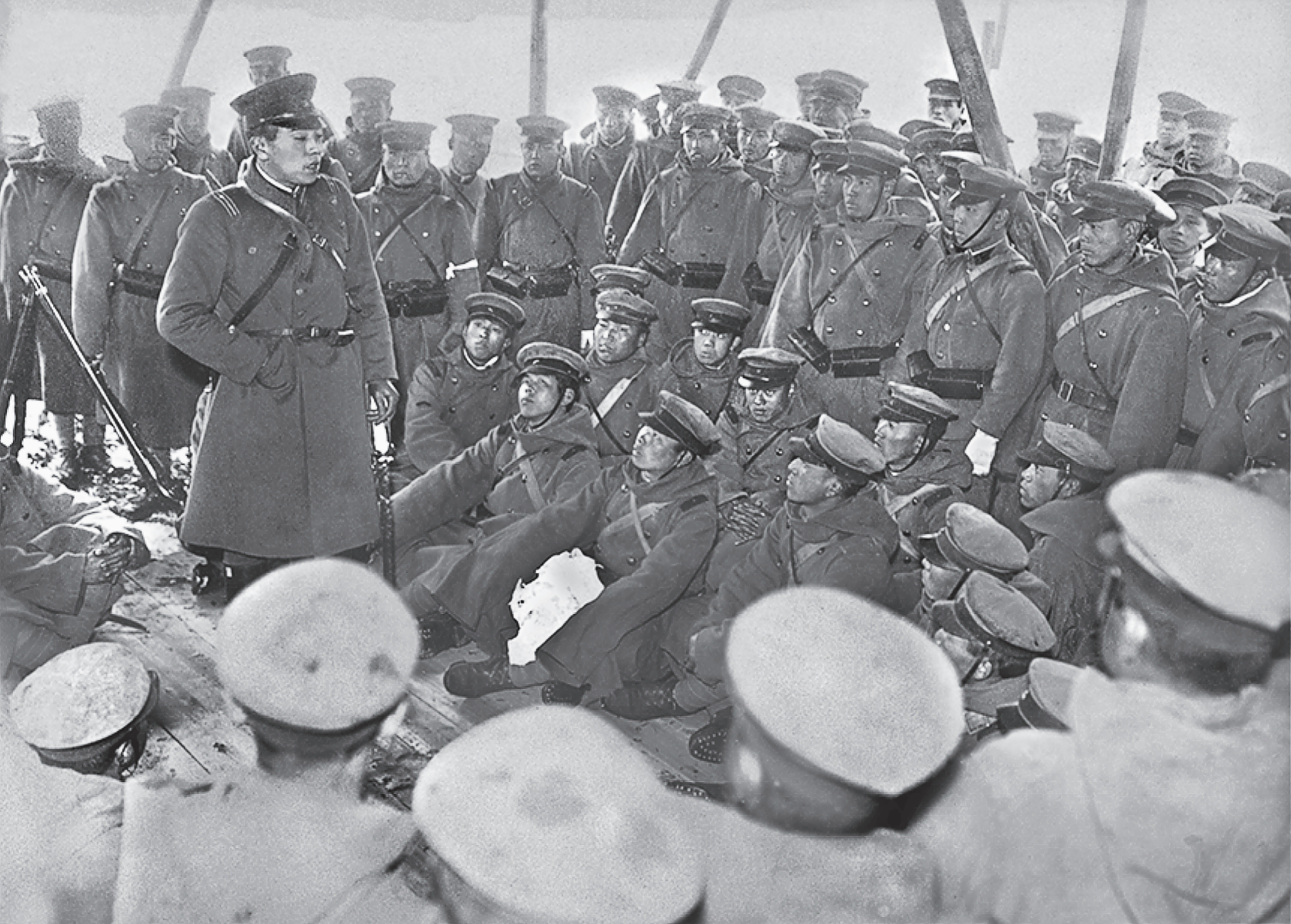
- 1st Lt. Nibu Masatada and his company on February 26, 1936
- Date: 26–29 February 1936
- Location: Tokyo, Japan; 35°39′51″N 139°41′49″E
- Goals: Restore direct imperial rule under Emperor Hirohito; Purge of the Tōseiha
- Result: Uprising suppressed: Loss of Kōdōha influence; Increase of military influence over government

Parties
Righteous Army	Imperial Japanese Army; Imperial Japanese Navy

Lead figures
Shirō Nonaka ‡‡; Hisashi Kōno ‡‡; Teruzō Andō (executed); Kurihara Yasuhide (executed); Kiyosada Kōda (executed); Asaichi Isobe (executed); Toshihiko Ikeda; Takaji Muranaka (executed)	Hirohito; (Empire of Japan) Prince Kotohito; (Empire of Japan) Yoshiyuki Kawashima; (Empire of Japan) Hajime Sugiyama; (Empire of Japan) Kōhei Kashii; (Empire of Japan) Jōtarō Watanabe X

Number
1,483–1,558	23,841

Casualties and losses
19 executed by firing squad Dozens imprisoned Several committed suicide	4 government officials killed 5 police officers killed

The February 26 incident (Japanese: 二・二六事件, Hepburn: Ni Ni-Roku Jiken), also known as the 2–26 incident, was an attempted coup d'état in the Empire of Japan on 26 February 1936. It was organized by a group of young Imperial Japanese Army (IJA) officers with the goal of purging the government and military leadership of their factional rivals and ideological opponents.

Although the rebels succeeded in assassinating several leading officials (including two former prime ministers) and in occupying the government center of Tokyo, they failed to assassinate Prime Minister Okada Keisuke or secure control of the Imperial Palace. Their supporters in the army made attempts to capitalize on their actions, but divisions within the military, combined with Imperial anger at the coup, meant they were unable to achieve a change of government. Facing overwhelming opposition as the army moved against them, the rebels surrendered on 29 February.

Unlike earlier examples of political violence by young officers, the coup attempt had severe consequences. After a series of closed trials, 19 of the uprising's leaders were executed for mutiny and another 40 were imprisoned. The radical Kōdōha faction lost its influence within the army, while the military, now free from infighting, increased its control over the civilian government, which had been severely weakened by the assassination of key moderate and liberal-minded leaders.

== Background ==
=== Army factional rivalry ===
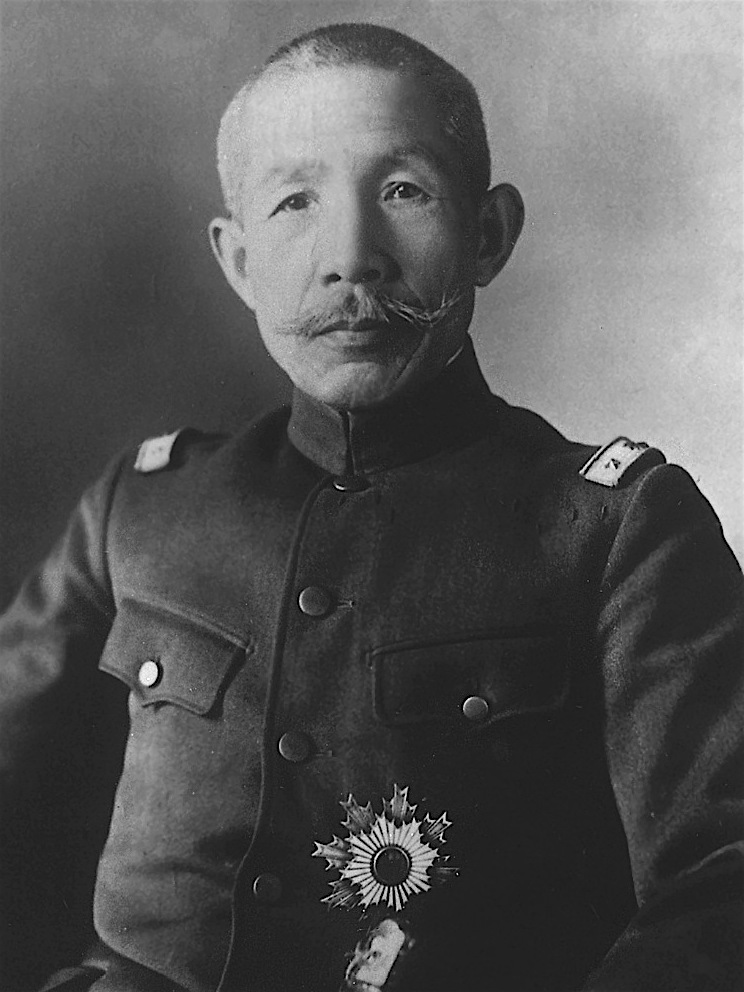
Sadao Araki, leader of the Kōdōha

The Imperial Japanese Army (IJA) had a long history of factionalism among its high-ranking officers, originally stemming from domainal rivalries in the Meiji period. By the early 1930s, officers in the high command had become split into two main informal groups: the Kōdōha "Imperial Way" faction led by General Sadao Araki and his ally General Jinzaburō Mazaki, and the Tōseiha "Control" faction identified with General Tetsuzan Nagata.

The Kōdōha emphasized the importance of Japanese culture, spiritual purity over material quality, and the need to attack the Soviet Union (Hokushin-ron), while the Tōsei-ha officers, who were strongly influenced by the ideas of the contemporary German general staff, supported central economic and military planning (total war theory), technological modernization, mechanization and expansion within China (Nanshin-ron). The Kōdōha was dominant in the IJA during Araki's tenure as Minister of War from 1931 to 1934, occupying most significant staff positions, but many of its members were replaced by Tōsei-ha officers following Araki's resignation.

=== The "young officers" ===
IJA officers were divided between those whose education had ended at the Army Academy (an undergraduate academy) and those who had advanced on to the prestigious Army War College (a graduate school for midlevel officers). The latter group formed the elite of the officer corps, while officers of the former group were effectively barred by tradition from advancement to higher-level staff positions. A number of the lesser-privileged officers formed the army's contribution to the young, highly politicized group often referred to as the "young officers" (青年将校, seinen shōkō).

The young officers believed that the problems facing the nation were the result of Japan straying from the kokutai (国体) (an amorphous term often translated as "national polity" which roughly signifies the relationship between the Emperor and the state). To them, the "privileged classes" exploited the people, leading to widespread poverty in rural areas, and deceived the Emperor, usurping his power and weakening Japan. The solution, they believed, was a "Shōwa Restoration" modeled on the Meiji Restoration of 70 years earlier. By rising up and destroying the "evil advisers around the Throne," the officers would enable the Emperor to re-establish his authority. The Emperor would then purge those who exploited the people, restoring prosperity to the nation. Those beliefs were strongly influenced by contemporary nationalist thought, especially the political philosophy of a former socialist, Ikki Kita. Almost all of the young officers' subordinates were from poor peasant family or working class, and believed that the young officers truly understood their predicaments and spirits.

The loose-knit young officers group varied in size, but is estimated to have had roughly 100 regular members, mostly officers in the Tokyo area. Its informal leader was Mitsugi (Zei) Nishida. A former IJA lieutenant and disciple of Kita, Nishida had become a prominent member of the civilian nationalist societies that proliferated in Japan from the late 1920s. He referred to the army group as the Kokutai Genri-ha (国体原理派; "National Principle") faction. Involved at least to some extent in most of the political violence of the period, following the March and October incidents of 1931, the army and navy members of the group split and largely ended their association with civilian nationalists.

Despite its relatively small size, the Kokutai Genri-ha faction was influential, due in no small part to the threat it posed. It had sympathizers among the general staff and the Imperial Family, most notably Prince Chichibu, the Emperor's brother (and, until 1933, his heir), who was friends with Nishida and other Kokutai Genri-ha leaders. Despite being fiercely anti-capitalist, the faction had also managed to secure irregular funding from zaibatsu leaders who hoped to shield themselves.

The exact nature of the relationship between the Kōdōha and the Kokutai Genri-ha was complicated, with historians treating the two factions either as the same entity or as two groups forming a larger whole. However, contemporary accounts and the writings of members of the two groups make clear they were actually distinct groups in a mutually beneficial alliance. The Kōdōha shielded the Kokutai Genri-ha and provided it with access, while they in exchange benefited from their perceived ability to restrain the radical officers.

=== Political violence ===
The years leading up to the February 26 Incident were marked by a series of violent outbursts by the young officers and their fellow nationalists against political opponents. Most notable was the May 15 Incident of 1932 in which young naval officers assassinated Prime Minister Inukai Tsuyoshi. The incident is significant because it convinced the young army officers (who were aware of but not involved in the attack) of the need to use troops in any potential coup attempt. The ringleaders of the incident, as in the previous March and October incidents, received relatively light punishments.

The direct prelude to the February 26 Incident, however, was the 1934 Military Academy Incident (November Incident) and its consequences. The incident consisted of the arrests of Captain Takaji Muranaka and Captain Asaichi Isobe, prominent members of the Kokutai Genri-ha, for planning a coup with a group of military cadets. Muranaka and Isobe admitted discussing such a coup but denied having any plans of actually carrying it out. The military court investigating the incident found there was insufficient evidence to indict, but Muranaka and Isobe were suspended by the army. The two were convinced that the incident was a Tōsei-ha attack on the young officers and began circulating a pamphlet calling for a "housecleaning" of the IJA and naming Tetsuzan Nagata as the "chief villain." They were then expelled from the IJA.

At around this time, General Jinzaburō Mazaki, the last Kōdōha officer in a prominent position, was forced out of office. The insidious and cantankerous Mazaki was generally disliked by his colleagues and his removal was not purely political, but the young officers were enraged because Mazaki had become the focus of their hopes after they became disillusioned with Araki for his failures to overcome resistance in the cabinet during his time as War Minister. Muranaka and Isobe released a new pamphlet attacking Nagata for the dismissal, as did Nishida.

On 12 August 1935, in the Aizawa Incident, Lieutenant-Colonel Saburō Aizawa, a member of the Kokutai Genri-ha and a friend of Mazaki, murdered Nagata in his office in retaliation. Aizawa's public trial, which began in late January 1936, became a media sensation, as Aizawa and the Kokutai Genri-ha leadership, in collusion with the judges, turned it into a soapbox from which their ideology could be broadcast. Aizawa's supporters in the mass media praised his "morality and patriotism," and Aizawa himself came to be seen as "a simple soldier who sought only to reform the army and the nation according to the true National Principle."

== Preparations ==
=== Deciding to act ===
The Kokutai Genri-ha had long supported a violent uprising against the government. The decision to finally act in February 1936 was caused by two factors. The first was the decision announced in December 1935 to transfer the 1st Division, to which most of the Kokutai Genri-ha's officers belonged, to Manchuria in the spring. That meant that if the officers did not strike before then, any possible action would be delayed by years. The second was Aizawa's trial. The impact of his actions had impressed the officers, and they believed that by acting while his trial was still in progress, they could take advantage of the favorable public opinion it was engendering.

The decision to act was initially opposed by Nishida and Kita when they learned of it. The pair's relationship with most of the officers had become relatively distant in the years leading up to the uprising, and they were against direct action. However, once it was clear that the officers were determined to act anyway, they moved to support them. Another barrier to be overcome was opposition to the involvement of troops from Teruzō Andō, who had sworn an oath to his commander not to involve his men in any direct action. Andō's position in the 3rd Infantry Regiment (the largest source of troops) was essential to the plot, so Muranaka and Shirō Nonaka spoke with him repeatedly, ultimately wearing down his resistance.

February 26 was chosen because the officers had been able to arrange to have themselves and their allies serve as duty officers on that date, facilitating their access to arms and ammunition. The date also allowed Mazaki to testify at Aizawa's trial as scheduled on the 25th.

=== Planning and manifesto ===
The uprising was planned in a series of meetings held between 18 and 22 February by Nishida, Yasuhide Kurihara, Teruzō Andō, Hisashi Kōno, Takaji Muranaka and Asaichi Isobe. The plan decided upon was relatively simple. The officers would assassinate the most prominent enemies of the kokutai, secure control of the administrative center of the capital and the Imperial Palace, then submit their demands (the dismissal of certain officers and the appointment of a new cabinet led by Mazaki). They had no longer-term goals, believing that those should be left to the Emperor. It is believed that they were prepared to replace Hirohito with Prince Chichibu if necessary, however.

The young officers believed they had at least tacit approval for their uprising from a number of important IJA officers after making a number of informal approaches. They included Araki, Minister of War Yoshiyuki Kawashima, Jinzaburō Mazaki, Tomoyuki Yamashita, Kanji Ishiwara, Shigeru Honjō and their own immediate commanders, Kōhei Kashii and Takeo Hori. Kawashima's successor as Minister of War later remarked that if all the officers who had supported the rebels had been forced to resign, there would not have been enough high-ranking officers left to replace them.

The young officers prepared an explanation of their intentions and grievances in a document entitled "Manifesto of the Uprising" (蹶起趣意書, Kekki Shuisho), which they wanted to be handed to the Emperor. The document was prepared by Muranaka, but written in Nonaka's name as he was the highest-ranking officer involved in the plot. The document was entirely in line with Kokutai Genri-ha ideals, blaming the genrō, political leaders, military factions, zaibatsu, bureaucrats and political parties for endangering the kokutai through their selfishness and disrespect for the Emperor and asserting the need for direct action:

Now, as we are faced with great emergencies both foreign and domestic, if we do not execute the disloyal and unrighteous who threaten the kokutai, if we do not cut away the villains who obstruct the Emperor's authority, who block the Restoration, the Imperial plan for our nation will come to nothing [...] To cut away the evil ministers and military factions near the Emperor and destroy their heart: that is our duty and we will complete it.

Seven targets were chosen for assassination for "threatening the kokutai":

Name	Position	Stated Reasons for Selection
Okada Keisuke	Prime Minister	Support for the London Naval Treaty, support for the "organ theory" of the kokutai.
Saionji Kinmochi	Genrō, former Prime Minister	Support for the London Naval Treaty, causing the Emperor to form improper cabinets.
Makino Nobuaki	former Lord Keeper of the Privy Seal, former Foreign Minister	Support for the London Naval Treaty, preventing Prince Fushimi from protesting to the Emperor at the time, establishing a court faction with Saitō.
Kantarō Suzuki	Grand Chamberlain	Support for the London Naval Treaty, "obstructing the Imperial virtue"
Saitō Makoto	Lord Keeper of the Privy Seal, former Prime Minister	Support for the London Naval Treaty, involvement in Mazaki's dismissal, establishing a court faction with Makino.
Takahashi Korekiyo	Finance Minister, former Prime Minister	Involvement in party politics, attempting to weaken the military, continuing the existing economic structure.
Jōtarō Watanabe	Mazaki's replacement as Inspector General of Military Education	Support for the "organ theory" of the kokutai, refusal to resign despite his unsuitability.

The first four mentioned in the above list survived the attempted coup. Saionji, Saitō, Suzuki and Makino were targeted because they were the most influential Imperial advisers. Okada and Takahashi were moderate political leaders who had worked to restrain the military. Finally, Watanabe was targeted as a member of the Tōsei-ha and because he had been involved with Mazaki's removal.

Saionji's name was ultimately removed from the list, but the reasons are disputed. Some of the officers' allies argued that he should be left alive to be used to help convince the Emperor to appoint Mazaki as prime minister, which is commonly given as the reason. However, Isobe testified later that he had rejected those suggestions and continued to make arrangements for the attack on Saionji. According to his account, the attack was canceled only after the officers who were assigned to carry it out (teachers at a military school in Toyohashi, Aichi Prefecture) could not agree over the use of cadets in the operation.

=== The Righteous Army ===
Flag used by rebel troops during the uprising: "Revere the Emperor, Destroy the Traitors"

From 22 February on, the seven leaders managed to convince eighteen other officers to join the uprising with varying degrees of enthusiasm. Non-commissioned officers (NCOs) were informed on the night of 25 February, hours before the attacks started. Although the officers insisted that all NCOs participated voluntarily and any orders given were merely pro forma, many of the NCOs argued later that they had been in no real position to refuse to participate. The soldiers themselves, 70% of whom were less than a month out of basic training, were not told anything before the coup began, though many were (according to the officers) enthusiastic once the uprising began.

The bulk of the Righteous Army was made up of men from the 1st Division's 1st Infantry Regiment (11th and MG companies; 456 men) and 3rd Infantry Regiment (1st, 3rd, 6th, 7th, 10th, and MG companies; 937 men). The only other significant contribution was 138 men from the 3rd Imperial Guard Regiment. Including officers, civilians and men from other units, the total size of the Righteous Army was 1,558 men. An official count of 1,483 was given at the time; that number excludes the 75 men who participated in Nakahashi's attempt to secure the Imperial Palace (see below).

The coup leaders adopted the name "Righteous Army" (義軍, gigun) for the force and the password "Revere the Emperor, Destroy the Traitors" (尊皇討奸, Sonnō Tōkan), adopted from the Meiji Restoration-era slogan, "Revere the Emperor, Destroy the Shogunate." Allies were also to display a three-sen postage stamp when approaching the army's lines.

== Uprising ==
Map of initial attacks

The night of 25 February brought heavy snowfall to Tokyo. This emboldened the rebel officers, as it reminded them of the 1860 Sakuradamon Incident in which shishi (political activists with ambitions) assassinated Ii Naosuke, the chief adviser to the Shōgun, in the name of the Emperor.

The rebel troops, divided into six groups, assembled their troops and left their barracks between 03:30 and 04:00. The attacks on Okada, Takahashi, Suzuki, Saito, the Ministry of War and the Tokyo Metropolitan Police headquarters occurred simultaneously at 05:00.

=== 1st Infantry Regiment ===
==== Okada Keisuke ====
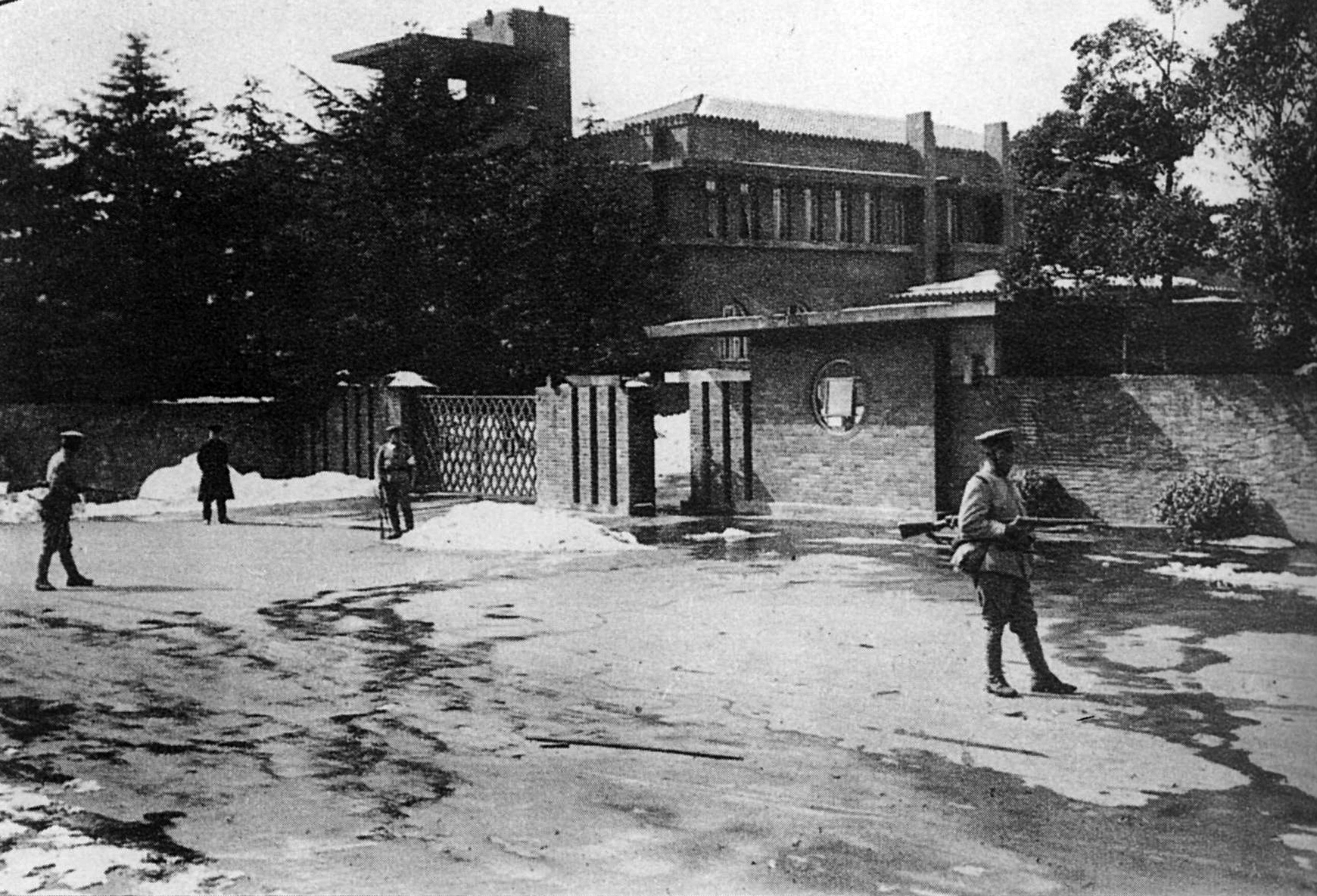
Rebels outside the Prime Minister's Residence during the February 26 Incident.

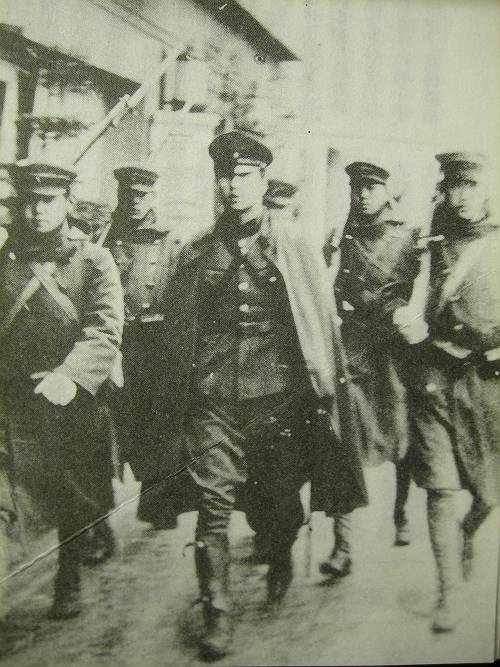
Yasuhide Kurihara leading the Rebellion Army

The attack on Okada consisted of 280 men from the 1st Infantry Regiment led by 1st Lieutenant Yasuhide Kurihara.

The troops surrounded the Prime Minister's Residence and forced its guards to open the gates. Upon entering the compound and attempting to find the prime minister, however, they were fired upon by four policemen. All four were killed after wounding six of the rebel soldiers, but the gunfire succeeded in warning Okada of the danger. He was taken into hiding by his brother-in-law, Colonel Denzō Matsuo. Matsuo, who was said to have resembled Okada, was then discovered and killed by the troops. The soldiers compared Matsuo's wounded face to a picture of the prime minister and concluded that they had succeeded in their mission. Okada escaped the next day, but that fact was kept a secret, and he played no further role in the incident. After Matsuo's death, Kurihara's men assumed guard positions around the compound. They were joined by sixty men from the 3rd Imperial Guard (see below).

==== Seizure of the Ministry of War ====
Captain Kiyosada Kōda, accompanied by Muranaka, Isobe, and others, led 160 men to seize control of the Minister of War's residence, the Ministry of War itself and the General Staff Office. Once that had been accomplished, they entered the residence and asked to see Minister Kawashima. When they were admitted to see him at 06:30, they read their manifesto aloud and handed him a document in which they made numerous demands of the army, including:

- The rapid resolution of the situation by Kawashima in a way that "advanced the cause of the Restoration"
- The prevention of the use of force against the Righteous Army
- The arrest of Kazushige Ugaki (Governor-General of Korea), Jirō Minami (commander of the Kwantung Army), Kuniaki Koiso (commander of the Korean Army) and Yoshitsugu Tatekawa for being "the source of the destruction of military command."
- The immediate dismissal of Lieutenant Colonel Akira Mutō, Colonel Hiroshi Nemoto, and Major Tadashi Katakura from the Imperial Japanese Army for promoting "factionalism"
- The appointment of Araki as the new commander of the Kwantung Army.

As Minister of War (1924–27, 1929–31), Ugaki had overseen a reduction in size and modernization of the army. He had also failed to back the March Incident plotters (who had hoped to make him prime minister). Minami, Muto, Nemoto and Katakura were all prominent members of the Tōsei-ha faction. Katakura was also partly responsible for reporting the Military Academy Incident. When Isobe encountered him outside the Ministry of War later that morning, he shot him (non-fatally) in the head.

During this period, a number of officers sympathetic to the rebels were admitted, including General Mazaki, General Tomoyuki Yamashita, General Ryū Saitō and the Vice-Minister of War, Motoo Furushō. Saitō praised the young officers' spirit and urged Kawashima to accept their demands. Shortly before 09:00, Kawashima stated that he needed to speak with the Emperor and left for the Imperial Palace.

==== Makino Nobuaki ====
Captain Hisashi Kōno commanded a team consisting of seven members, including six civilians, to attack Makino, who was staying at Kōfūsō, part of the ryokan Itōya in Yugawara, Kanagawa Prefecture, with his family. Arriving at 05:45, they stationed two men outside, then entered the inn with weapons drawn, and policemen stationed inside then opened fire and began a lengthy gunfight. A policeman notified Makino and his party of the attack and led them to a rear entrance. The assassins fired upon the group as they left but did not realize that Makino had managed to escape. Kōno was wounded in the chest during the gunfire, and one policeman, Yoshitaka Minagawa, was killed. As Kōno was carried from the fighting, the assassins set fire to the building. Hearing a single shot, Kōno believed Makino had shot himself inside the burning building. The men took Kōno to a nearby military hospital, where all were arrested by military police.

==== Attack on the Asahi Shimbun ====
At approximately 10:00, Kurihara and Nakahashi boarded three trucks with sixty men and traveled from the Prime Minister's Residence to the offices of the Asahi Shimbun, a prominent liberal newspaper. Charging into the building, the officers forced the newspaper employees to evacuate while yelling that the attack was "divine retribution for being an un-Japanese newspaper." They then overturned and scattered the newspaper's type trays (containing 4,000 different characters) on the floor and temporarily prevented the newspaper from publishing. Following the attack, the men distributed copies of the uprising's manifesto to nearby newspapers and returned to the Prime Minister's Residence.

=== 3rd Imperial Guard ===
==== Takahashi Korekiyo ====
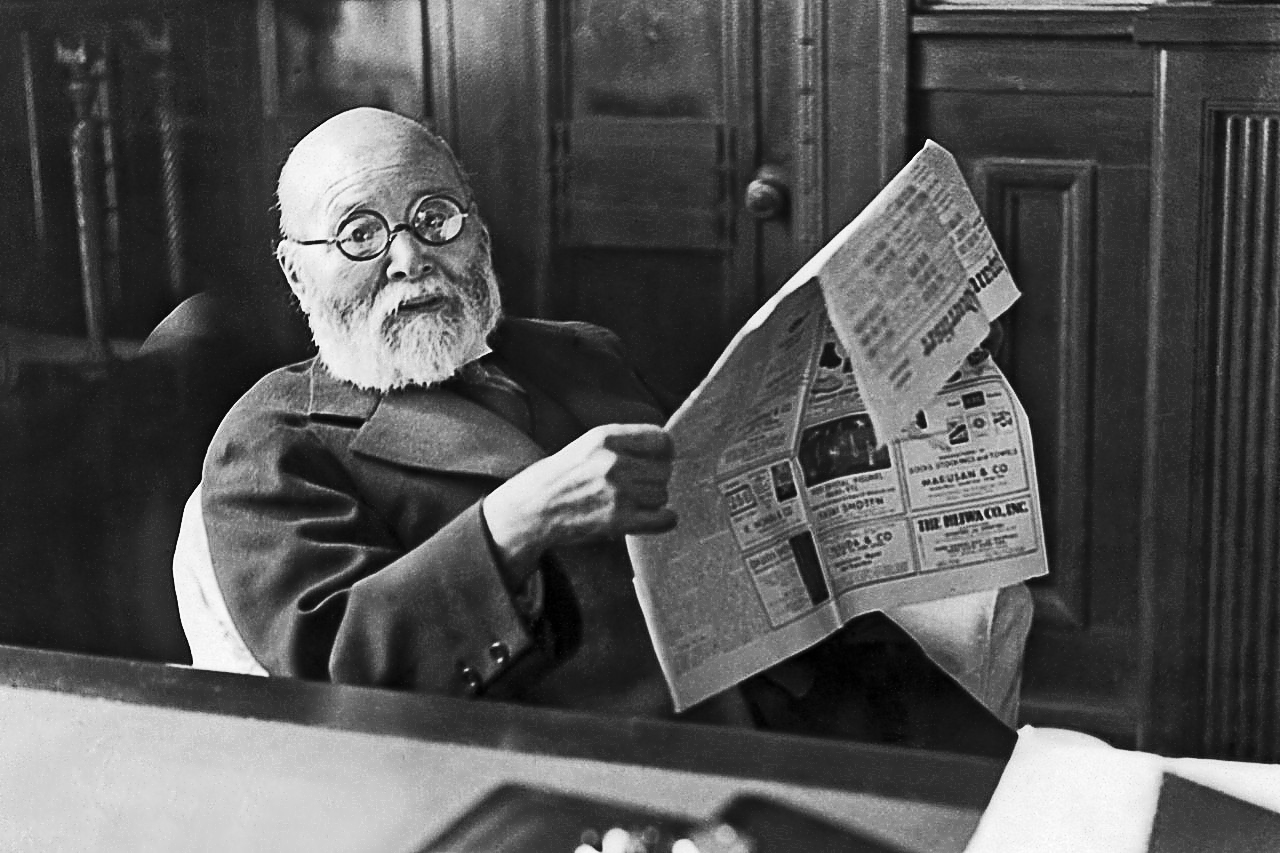
Takahashi Korekiyo

First Lieutenant Motoaki Nakahashi of the 3rd Imperial Guard assembled 135 men and, telling his commanders that they were going to pay their respects at Yasukuni Shrine (or Meiji Jingū; sources differ), marched to Takahashi's personal residence. There he split his men in half and took one group to attack the residence while having the other stand guard outside. After the men smashed their way into the compound, confused servants led Nakahashi and Lieutenant Kanji Nakajima to Takahashi's bedroom. There, Nakahashi shot the sleeping Takahashi with his pistol while Nakajima slashed him with his sword. Takahashi died without waking.

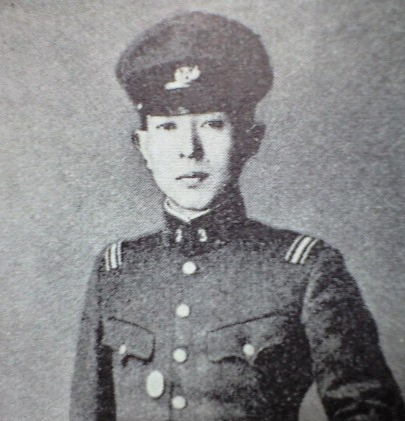
Motoaki Nakahashi

Once Takahashi was dead, Nakahashi sent the group that had participated in the attack to join the troops already at the Prime Minister's Residence. He then accompanied the remaining group of men onward to the Imperial Palace.

==== Attempt to secure the Imperial Palace ====
Nakahashi and his 75 men entered the palace grounds using the western Hanzō Gate at 06:00. Nakahashi's unit was the scheduled emergency relief company (赴援隊, fuentai), and he told the commander of the palace guard, Major Kentarō Honma, that he had been dispatched to reinforce the gates because of the attacks earlier that morning. Honma had been informed of the attacks, so he found Nakahashi's arrival unsurprising. Nakahashi was assigned to help secure the Sakashita Gate, the main entrance to the grounds directly in front of the Kyūden (the Emperor's residence).

Nakahashi's plan had been to secure the Sakashita Gate, then use flashlights to signal the nearby rebel troops at police headquarters to join him. Having gained control over access to the Emperor, the rebels would then be able to prevent anyone but Honjō and others they approved of from seeing him. Nakahashi had difficulty contacting his allies, however, and by 08:00 Honma had learned of his involvement in the uprising. Nakahashi was ordered at gunpoint to leave the palace grounds. He did so, joining Kurihara at the Prime Minister's Residence. His soldiers remained at the gate until they were relieved at 13:00, when they returned to their barracks. For that reason, the 75 soldiers were not included in the government's official tally of rebel forces.

=== 3rd Infantry Regiment ===
==== Saitō Makoto ====
1st Lieutenant Naoshi Sakai led 120 men from the 3rd Infantry Regiment to Saitō's private residence in Yotsuya. A group of the soldiers surrounded the policemen on guard, who surrendered. Five men, including Sakai, entered the residence and found Saitō and his wife Haruko on the second floor in their bedroom. They shot Saitō, who fell to the ground dead. His wife covered him with her body and told the soldiers, "Please kill me instead!" They pulled her off and continued to fire at Saitō. Haruko was wounded by a stray bullet. Following Saitō's death, two officers led a group of men to attack General Watanabe. The rest left to assume a position northeast of the Ministry of War.

==== Kantarō Suzuki ====
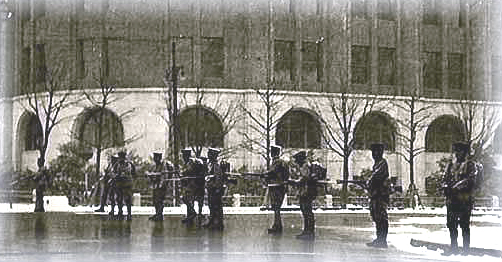
Rebels occupying Nagata-cho and Akasaka area during the February 26 Incident.

Captain Teruzō Andō led 200 men of the 3rd Infantry Regiment to Suzuki's private residence just across from the Imperial Palace in Kōjimachi. They surrounded and disarmed the police on guard, then a group entered the building. After Suzuki was discovered in his bedroom, he was shot twice (sources differ as to who fired the shots). Andō then moved to deliver a coup de grace with his sword, when Suzuki's wife pleaded to be allowed to do it herself. Believing Suzuki to be mortally wounded, Andō agreed. He apologized to her, explaining that it was done for the sake of the nation. He then ordered his men to salute Suzuki and they left to guard the Miyakezaka junction north of the Ministry of War. Suzuki, although seriously wounded, would survive.

Andō had visited Suzuki at his home in 1934 to suggest that Araki be appointed prime minister following Saitō's resignation. Suzuki had rejected the suggestion, but Andō had come away with a favorable impression of Suzuki.

==== Jōtarō Watanabe ====
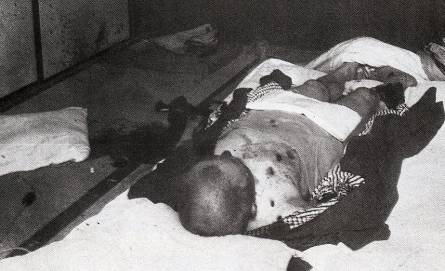
Jōtarō Watanabe's dead body

Following the attack on Saitō, twenty men led by 2nd Lieutenant Tarō Takahashi and 2nd Lieutenant Yutaka Yasuda boarded two trucks and headed to Watanabe's residence in Ogikubo, on the outskirts of Tokyo, arriving shortly after 07:00. Despite the two hours that had passed since the other attacks, no attempt had been made to warn Watanabe.

As the men attempted to enter the front of the residence, they were fired upon by military police stationed inside. Yasuda and another soldier were wounded. The soldiers then forced their way in through the rear entrance, where they encountered Watanabe's wife standing outside their bedroom on the second floor. Shoving her aside, they found Watanabe using a futon for cover. Watanabe opened fire with his pistol, whereupon one of the soldiers fired a burst at him with a light machine gun. Takahashi then rushed forward and stabbed Watanabe with his sword. Watanabe's nine-year-old daughter, Kazuko, witnessed his death as she hid behind a table nearby. The soldiers then boarded their trucks and left, taking their two wounded to a hospital, then assuming a position in northern Nagatachō.

==== Tokyo Metropolitan Police headquarters ====
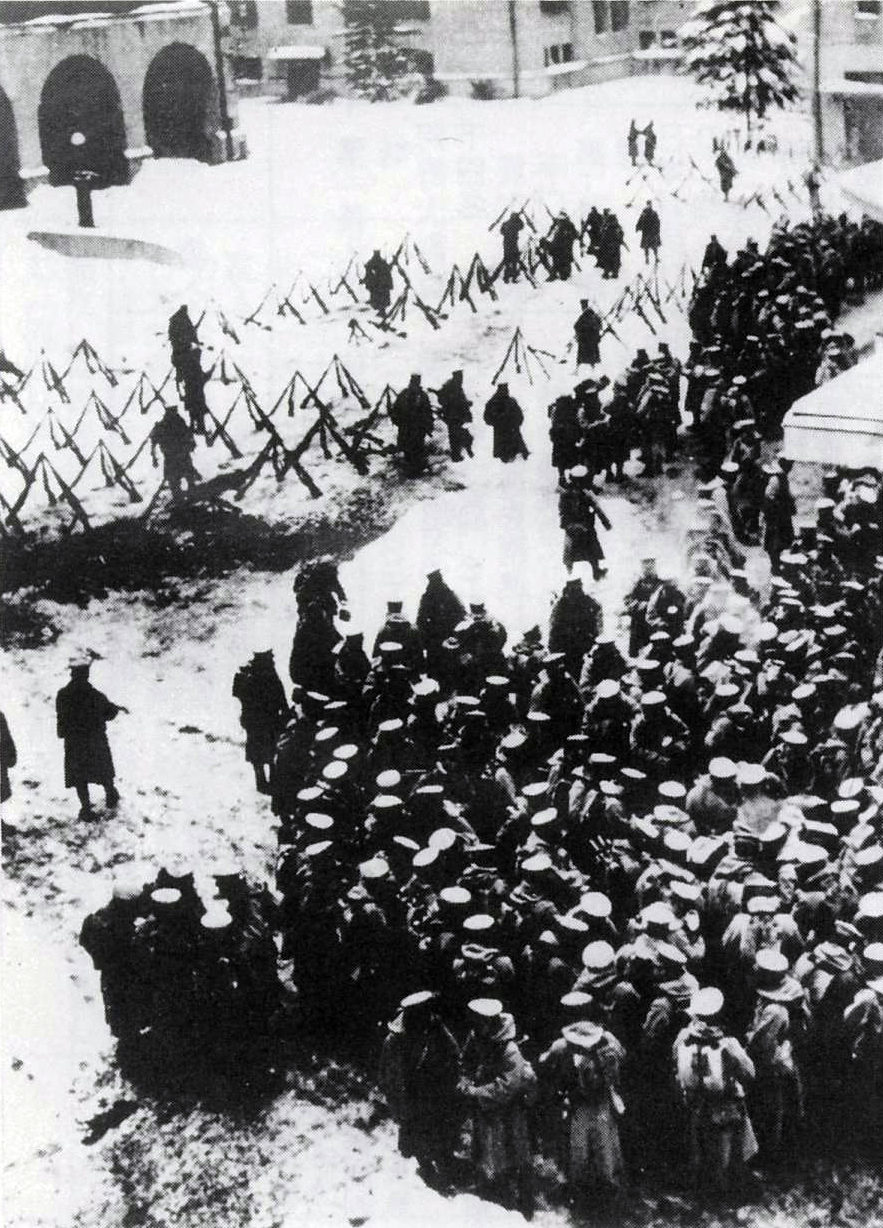
Rebel troops assembling at police headquarters during the February 26 Incident

Captain Shirō Nonaka took nearly a third of all the rebels' troops, 500 men from the 3rd Infantry Regiment, to attack the headquarters of the Tokyo Metropolitan Police, located directly south of the Imperial Palace, with the goal of securing its communication equipment and preventing the dispatch of the police's Emergency Service Unit (特別警備隊, Tokubetsu Keibi-tai). They met no resistance and soon secured the building, possibly because of a police decision to leave the situation in the hands of the army. Nonaka's group was as large as it was because it was intended to move on to the palace itself.

After the occupation of the police headquarters, 2nd Lieutenant Kinjirō Suzuki led a small group to attack the nearby residence of Fumio Gotō, the Home Minister. Gotō was not home, however, and escaped the attack. The attack appears to have been the result of an independent decision by Suzuki, rather than to have been part of the officers' overall plan, however.

== Government response and suppression of the uprising ==
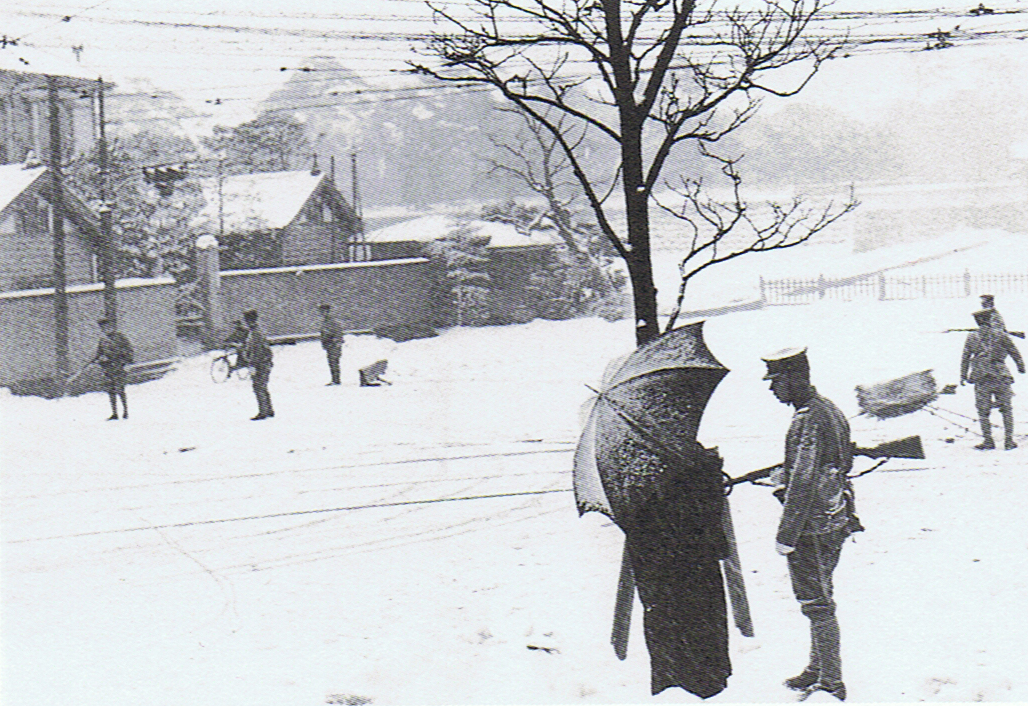
Hanzōmon, February 26, 1936

=== Opposition of the Court faction and Emperor ===
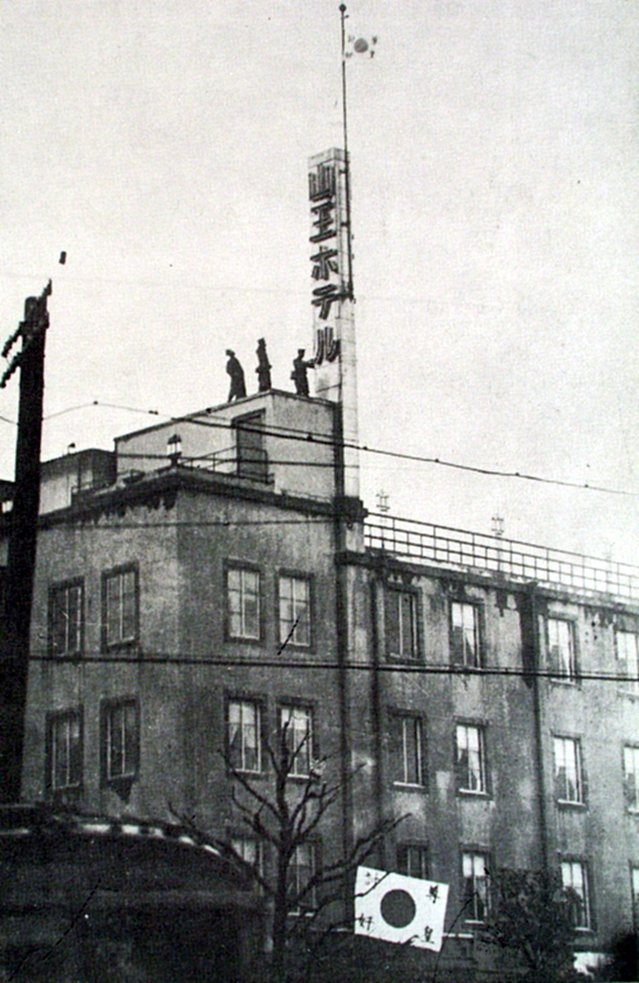
Rebel occupation of the Sannō Hotel

The Imperial Palace learned of the uprising when Captain Ichitarō Yamaguchi, a supporter of rebel officers and duty officer for the 1st Infantry Regiment, informed his father-in-law, General Shigeru Honjō, the Emperor's chief aide-de-camp and member of the Kōdōha, at about 05:00. Honjō then contacted his subordinates and the chief of the military police and headed to the palace. The Emperor himself learned of the incident at 05:40 and met with Honjō shortly after 06:00. He told Honjō to end the incident, although he was not specific as to how.

With Saitō dead and Suzuki gravely wounded, the Emperor's chief remaining advisors were Kōichi Kido, Chief Secretary to the Lord Keeper; Kurahei Yuasa, Minister of the Imperial Household; and Vice-Grand Chamberlain Tadataka Hirohata. Those officials met after learning of the attacks from Suzuki's secretary. They took a hard line, advising the Emperor that he should demand that efforts be concentrated on suppressing the uprising and that he must not accept the resignation of the current government, as doing so would "effectively be granting victory to the rebel army." It was after hearing that advice that Hirohito hardened his position.

Kawashima met with the Emperor at 09:30 after his meeting with the rebel officers at the Ministry of War. He read the officers' manifesto and demands aloud and then recommended the Emperor form a new cabinet to "clarify the kokutai, stabilize national life, and fulfill national defense." The Emperor refused and demanded that Kawashima suppress the uprising. When the remaining members of Okada's government, unaware that he was alive, attempted to resign that afternoon, Hirohito told them he would not allow it until the uprising had been suppressed. The Emperor appointed Home Minister Fumio Gotō as acting prime minister.

=== The Minister of War's proclamation and de facto recognition ===
The Supreme Military Council (SMC) held an unofficial meeting in the afternoon, attended by a number of other officers including Kashii, Yamashita, Kawashima and Hajime Sugiyama, Vice Chief of Staff. The SMC, while a prestigious part of the IJA, had little function in peacetime and had therefore become a body to which high-ranking officers could be appointed without actually granting them power. For that reason, a number of Kōdōha generals, including Araki and Mazaki, had been made members by 1936.

The authority of that meeting was disputed since it had not been convened by the Emperor, and Sugiyama argued that it had no authority. Araki countered that the "elders of the army" had a moral obligation to resolve the situation. The Kōdōha members and their supporters controlled a clear majority of the council.

Despite the Emperor's order to Kawashima that the uprising be suppressed, Araki proposed that a message be drafted to the rebels. The message, which came to be known as the "Minister of War's Proclamation," has become a point of controversy (it was issued in Kawashima's name because of the unofficial nature of the SMC meeting). Araki and other participants argued later that it had been intended to persuade the officers to surrender. Others interpreted it as an endorsement of the uprising.

The proclamation read:

1. The purpose of your actions has been reported to His Majesty.
2. We recognize that your motives are based on a sincere desire to clarify the national polity.
3. The current state of the national polity (including its defilement) is a matter of great regret to us.
4. All the Supreme War Councilors have agreed to unite and move forward in accordance with the principles stated above.
5. Beyond this everything depends upon His Majesty's will.

Once approved, Yamashita brought the message to the rebels in the Ministry of War, who were pleased but somewhat confused by its vagueness. Some of the officers later testified that Yamashita claimed that the Emperor had approved the message, but that was denied by Yamashita.

Another point of controversy was the proclamation's wording. Although the above text notes that the rebels' "motives" were recognized, another version of the text was distributed by Kashii (possibly at Kawashima's instructions) shortly after 15:30 to military units in Tokyo. This version recognized the rebels' "actions," rather than their "motives." The difference has been attributed to Kōdōha manipulation of the text after-the-fact. Araki, Yamashita and others claimed that what Kashii distributed was an earlier unfinished draft of the proclamation.

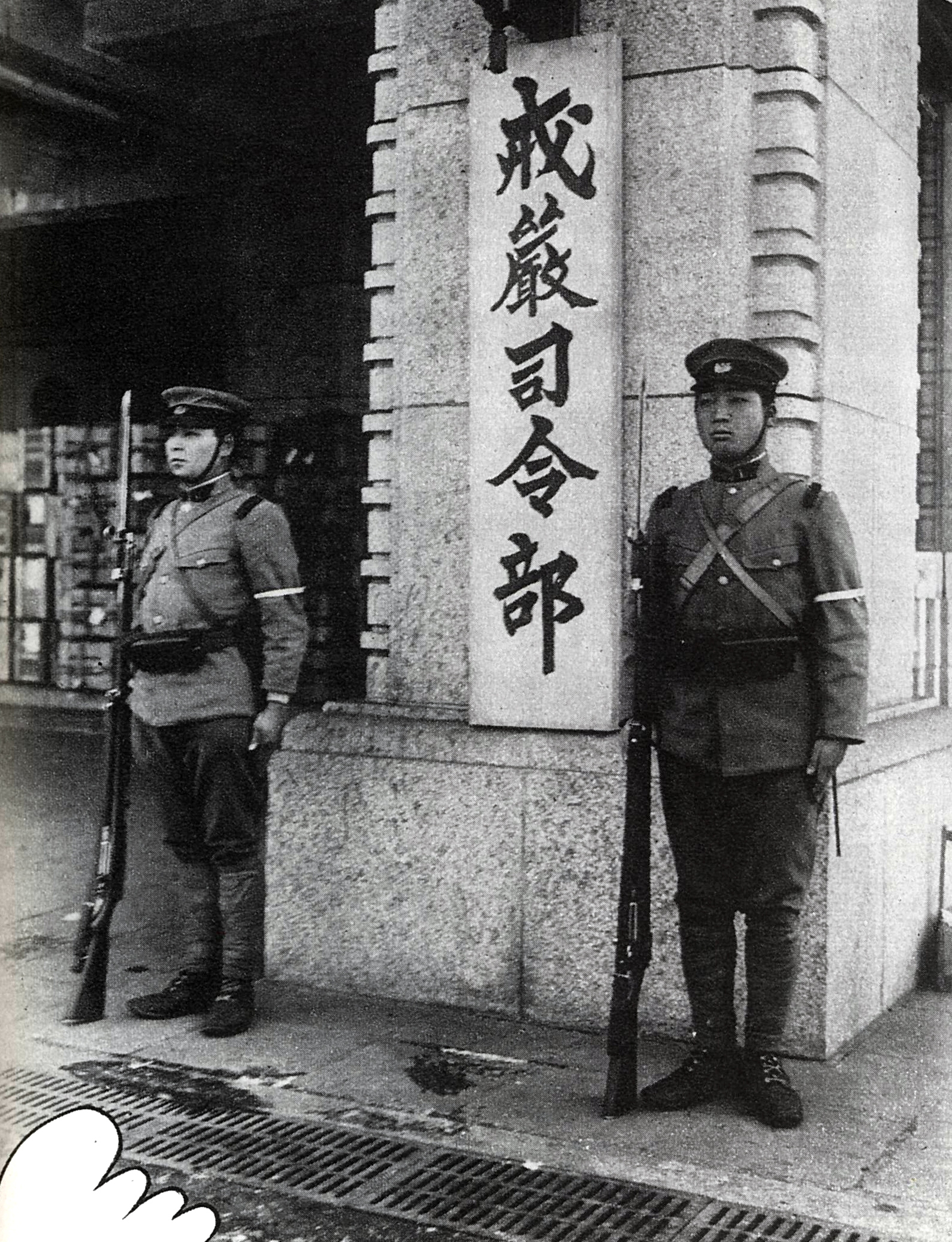
Martial Law Headquarters

Two other developments deepened the rebel officers' impression that their uprising had succeeded. At 15:00, shortly before the Minister of War's message was released, Kashii, acting as commander of the Tokyo garrison, ordered a state of "wartime emergency" (戦時警備, senji keibi) in the 1st Division's operational area, which included the area being occupied by the rebel troops. That had the effect of formally placing the rebel troops within the chain of command under Lieutenant General Takeo Hori's 3rd Infantry Regiment. Hori placed them under Colonel Satoshi Kofuji and charged them with maintaining law and order in their area. Thus, the rebel officers were no longer acting illegally by occupying their positions. As with the earlier Minister of War's Proclamation, the order was later justified as an attempt to convince the rebel officers to end their occupation. The officers were, however, encouraged by the act and convinced that they were on the verge of success.

The second positive development was the declaration of martial law. The cabinet initially opposed that measure, as it feared it would be used to impose military rule (just as the young officers hoped), but it had no choice but to approve it after Kawashima insisted it was necessary to resolve the uprising. The Privy Council concurred, and the edict was signed by the Emperor at 01:20 on the 27th. Kashii was made chief of Martial Law Headquarters. In his first order, issued later that morning, he ordered the rebel troops to enforce martial law in the Kōjimachi area, which they were occupying.

=== Opposition within the military ===
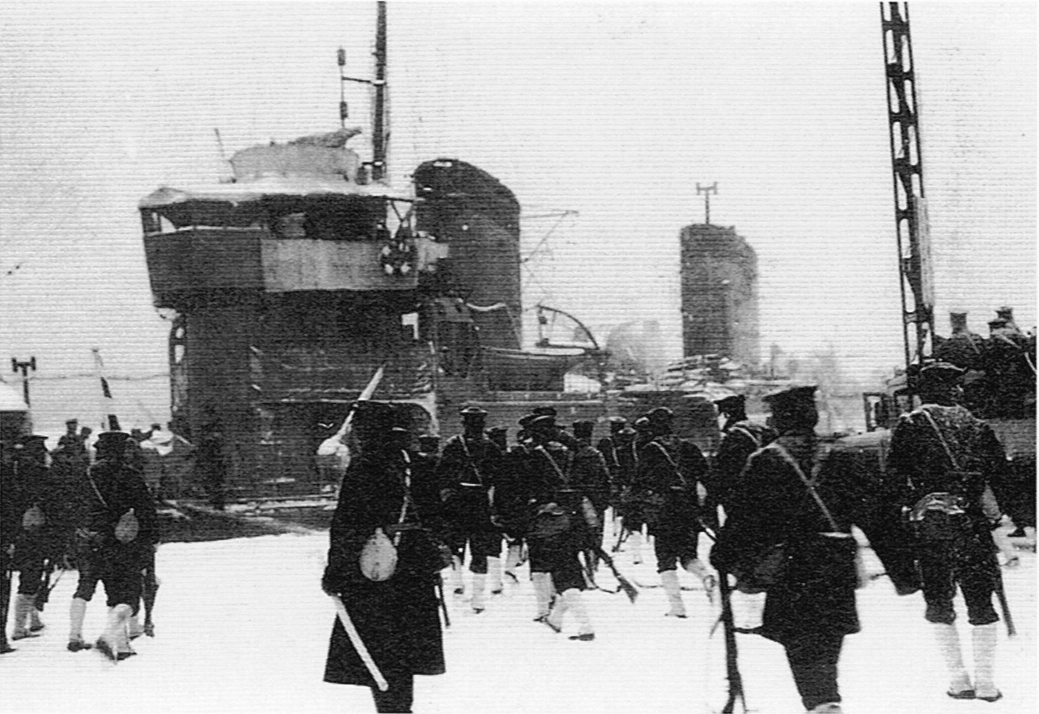
Imperial Japanese Navy Land Force of Yokosuka arriving at Shibaura, Tokyo, after the outbreak of the "February 26 Incident."

Despite the above developments, the position of the Righteous Army was less secure than it seemed. Most significantly, as noted above, the Emperor and his court officials had taken a hard line towards the uprising. In addition, the rebels also faced important opposition within the military as well, especially from the Army General Staff and navy. Many within the army were pleased by the assassinations because they had removed a number of the army's opponents within the government. However, they could not accept the more radical social ideas included within a "Shōwa Restoration" and were not disposed to accept a Kōdōha-dominated cabinet. Others, such as Kanji Ishiwara, were infuriated at the rebel officers' use of troops without authorization.

The General Staff was effectively ruled by a triumvirate made up of the Chief of Staff, Vice Chief of Staff and Inspector General of Military Education. With Watanabe assassinated and the Chief of Staff (Prince Kan'in) ill and away from the capital, Vice Chief of Staff Sugiyama had full control. Sugiyama, a member of the Tōsei-ha, had from the beginning favored the forcible removal of the rebel occupation of the capital. His unwillingness to accept a new cabinet and present a united front with the SMC to the Emperor would ultimately be a major factor in the uprising's collapse. Initially concerned about the uncertainty of the situation, however, he called in reinforcements only from outside Tokyo.

The Navy General Staff had taken a similarly dim view of the uprising, at least partly because of the attacks on three admirals (Okada, Saitō and Suzuki). It summoned the 1st Fleet to Tokyo on 26 February. By the afternoon of 27 February, forty warships were stationed in Tokyo Bay, and a force of 400 of the Navy's land forces (rikusentai) led by Captain Seishiro Sato sailed to Tokyo, and after a confrontation with the rebels at the Prime Minister's residence, spread out to defend naval installations in the city. Sato was from Isoroku Yamamoto's hometown of Nagaoka and was a Yamamoto protégé.

=== Negotiations and stalemate ===
Thus, by the evening of 26 February, the uprising had resulted in a stalemate. The Emperor and Sugiyama's opposition had prevented the achievement of its primary goal: the appointment of a military-dominated cabinet centered around Mazaki. Although the Righteous Army had managed to achieve a degree of official recognition for their actions, it was obvious that they could not occupy their positions indefinitely. Their presence was their strongest bargaining chip, but even their supporters felt that it needed to end.

It was for that reason that Araki, Mazaki and most other members of the SMC met with Muranaka and Kurihara at the Ministry of War on the night of 26 February. There they congratulated the officers again, but asked that they return to their units and leave the rest to the SMC. The rebel officers refused, correctly pointing out that it was only because they had fully armed troops behind them the generals were prepared to listen, and again spoke of the need to promote the Shōwa Restoration and form a "strong cabinet centered around the military." No agreement was reached.

That approach was followed by late-night negotiations at the Imperial Hotel between Ishiwara and Lieutenant Colonel Sakichi Mitsui, a supporter of the uprising. They reached a compromise: a new cabinet under Admiral Eisuke Yamamoto would be appointed and the rebel troops would return to their units. This compromise was rejected by both Sugiyama (who insisted the Emperor would not approve a new cabinet) and the rebel officers (who would only accept a Mazaki cabinet).

Finally, a settlement seemed to have been reached when the rebel officers asked to see Mazaki on 27 February. Mazaki, accompanied by two other members of the SMC (Nobuyuki Abe and Yoshikazu Nishi), arrived at the Ministry of War at 16:00. Gathered there were all the rebel officers except Andō and Kurihara, who were in charge of the troops outside, and Kōno, who was still hospitalized. The rebels told Mazaki that they were entrusting everything to him. Mazaki thanked them, but explained that he could do nothing until they returned to their units. He also stated that he would fight them himself if they went against the Emperor's wishes. The rebels replied that if they received a formal order to return, they would of course obey it. Following the meeting, both Mazaki and the rebel officers were relieved. Mazaki believed the rebel officers would leave without violence and the rebels were apparently convinced that a Mazaki cabinet would be formed shortly after they did so. Kashii issued orders for the troops to stay the night in the buildings they had occupied and reported to the Emperor that the situation would be resolved by the morning.

=== The imperial command ===
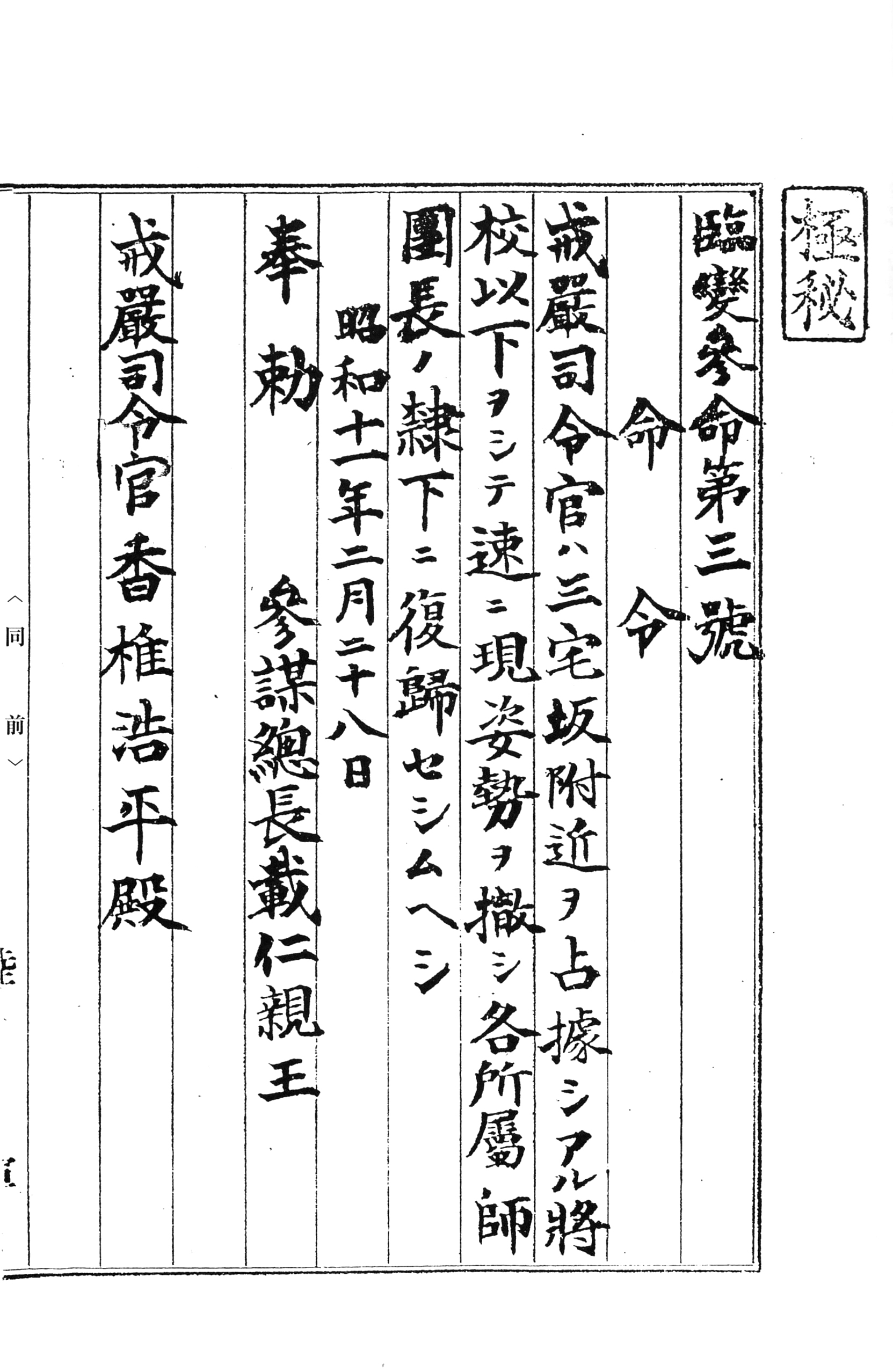
Order in Prince Kan'in Kotohito's name transmitting the imperial command to Kōhei Kashii

However, unknown to Kashii, Mazaki and the rebel officers, Sugiyama had already asked the Emperor at 08:20 to issue an imperial command authorizing the use of force against the Righteous Army. That was immediately granted and issued to Sugiyama, to be released at his discretion. Addressed to Kashii, the command ordered him to quickly evict "the officers and men occupying the Miyakezaka area."

The Emperor had by the end of 27 February become increasingly impatient with the failure of the Army to suppress the uprising as he had ordered on the previous day. The Navy's quick response satisfied him, but the Army's hesitation was inexplicable to the Emperor. He summoned Honjō throughout the day, demanding to know if the rebels had been suppressed. When Honjō spoke in defense of the officers' motives, the Emperor angrily replied "killing my ministers is tantamount to strangling me with cotton wool" and added that the rebels deserved no leniency. At one point, Hirohito became so impatient he threatened to assume personal command of the Imperial Guard and order them to attack the rebels himself.

The General Staff and Martial Law Headquarters decided to release the imperial command at 05:00 on 28 February. From that point, formal documents, which had previously used "uprising," the word chosen by the rebel officers themselves, began to use the word "rebellion" (叛乱, hanran) instead.

At 08:00, the rebel officers' nominal superior, Major Kofuji, was told to inform the officers of the imperial command and order them to return to their units. However, Muranaka and Kōda had already heard of the command from Nakahashi. Believing the order to be a mistake, they went to see him. When they met Kofuji, he told them to come to 1st Division Headquarters. There, they met General Hori, who lied to them by telling them that no command had been issued. The relieved but skeptical officers left.

A meeting of the heads of the army, including Kawashima, Kashii and Sugiyama, had been held from the early morning onward (Araki and Mazaki had attempted to attend but had been told to leave, as the SMC had no authority). Kawashima and Kashii attempted to convince the group to avoid violence, but when 10:00 passed without any word of movement by the rebel officers, they approved the use of force. However, when Hori and Kofuji came to see Kashii at 10:40, the three agreed that it was too early to enact the imperial command. It has also been suggested that a lack of preparedness on the part of government forces was another factor. Either way, the action was delayed.

Yamashita visited the Ministry of War at 12:00 and told the rebel officers that the issuance of the imperial command was merely a matter of time and that they should "take responsibility." Hori joined the group at 12:30 and confirmed Yamashita's words. Shortly afterward, Kurihara, speaking for the group, asked that an imperial messenger be sent. He said that the officers would commit suicide and that the NCOs would take the soldiers back to their barracks. Yamashita, joined by Kawashima, immediately went to the Imperial Palace, where he informed Honjō of the officers' request for the imperial command for their suicide, which was perceived to be the only honorable way out for them. Honjō, thinking that was a good solution for all parties concerned, asked his majesty that the request be granted, but to his surprise, the Emperor flatly refused. His fury was such that he said, "If they want to die, do as they wish. Do it on their own. An Imperial Command is out of question."

Not all the rebels had been prepared to commit suicide. Andō had been infuriated at the idea and yelled that "the generals want to use us as footstools and have us kill ourselves." His rejection of the idea and the Emperor's refusal led to a change of heart among the officers. By 13:30, they had decided to fight. Kofuji learned that at 14:00, when he finally attempted to gather the officers to read them the imperial command and they refused to return to their units (the orders had to be formally given in order to be valid). Soon afterward, at 16:00, Martial Law Headquarters announced that force would be used and the rebel troops were removed from Kofuji's command at 18:00. At 23:00 orders went out to begin preparations at 05:00 on 29 February for a general attack.

=== Final hours ===
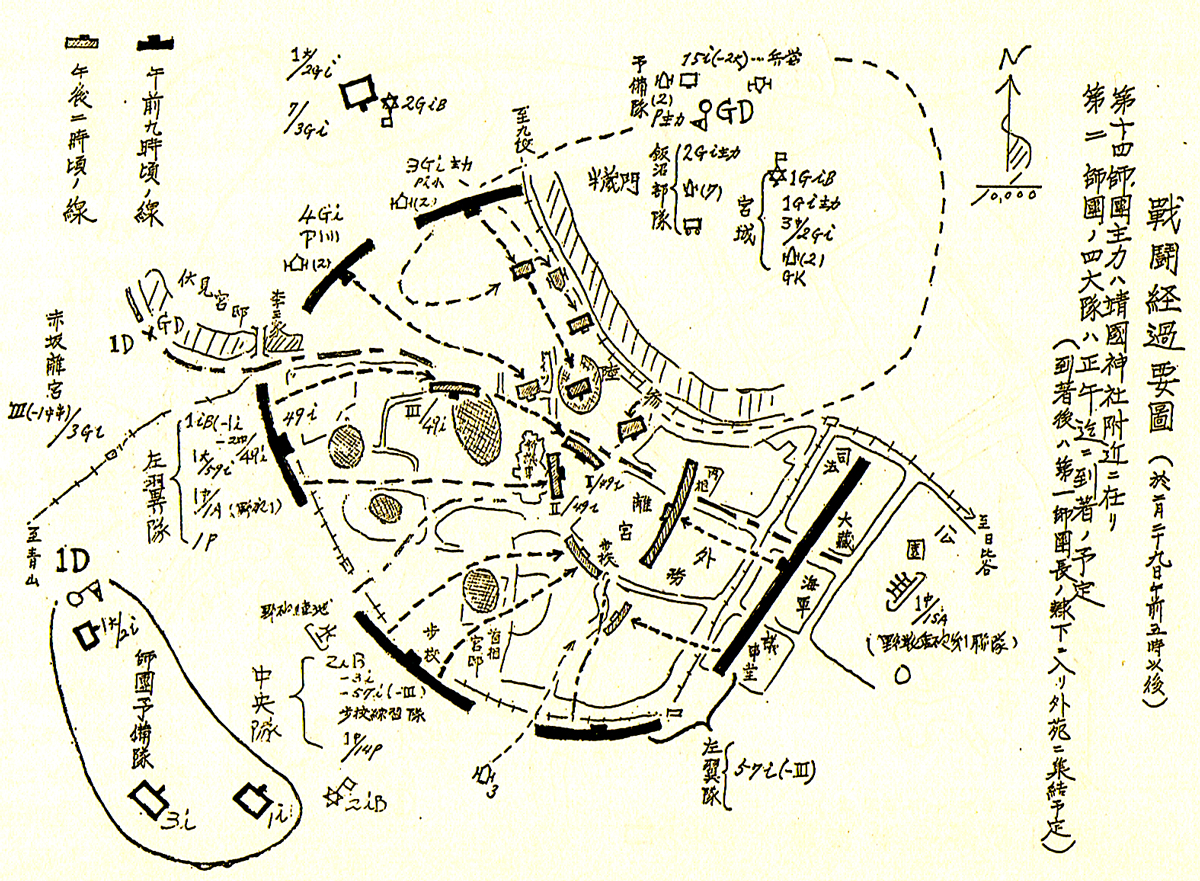
Occupied area on February 29, 1936. The troops were surrounded.

By the morning of 29 February, the Righteous Army, consisting of less than 1,500, was surrounded by more than 20,000 loyal government troops and 22 tanks. The general attack was planned for 09:00. By 05:30 all civilians in the surrounding areas had been evacuated.

From 08:00 the IJA began a major propaganda push towards the rebel troops. Three planes scattered leaflets from the air, a giant ad balloon adorned with the words, "The Imperial Command has been issued, do not resist the Army colors!" was suspended nearby and a series of radio broadcasts were made over NHK. The broadcasts and leaflets assured soldiers it was not too late to return to their units and informed them of the imperial command. (The broadcasts would cause later problems since they had promised that all crimes would be forgiven.) Those efforts, together with the hopeless odds, had a devastating effect. Desertions began shortly after midnight; by 10:00, many of the troops were gone.

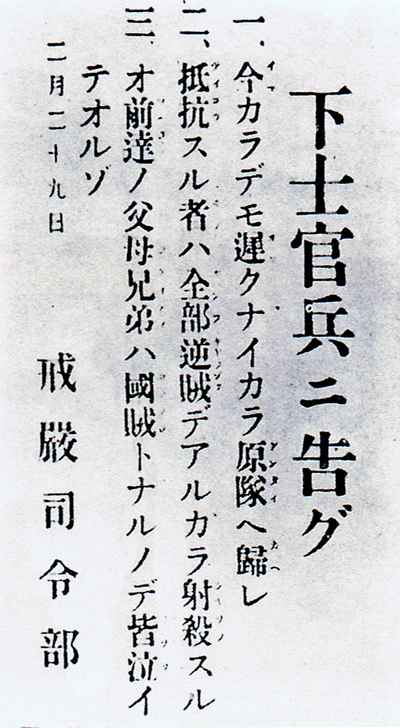
To enlisted men!: 1. It is still not too late, so return to your units.; 2. All those who resist will be shot as rebels.; 3. Your fathers, mothers, brothers, and sisters are all weeping because they will become traitors.; Martial Law Headquarters, February 29.

Realizing the hopelessness of their situation, all the officers except Andō released their soldiers by noon. Finally, at 13:00, Andō ordered his men to leave and attempted suicide by shooting himself in the head. The rest assembled at the Ministry of War. There, they met Yamashita and Ishiwara, who suggested that they commit suicide. They allowed the men to keep their sidearms and left. Colonel Nobutoki Ide, a member of the General Staff and Nonaka's former commander, came to the building and called for Nonaka to come outside. Shortly afterwards, Nonaka shot himself. Isobe claimed that Nonaka was forced to commit suicide in an attempt to pressure the rest of the officers to do the same. The final rebel officer to commit suicide was Kōno, still hospitalized from the failed attack on Makino, who stabbed himself with a knife a week later. The remaining officers were arrested by military police at 18:00. They were all stripped of rank.

== Aftermath ==
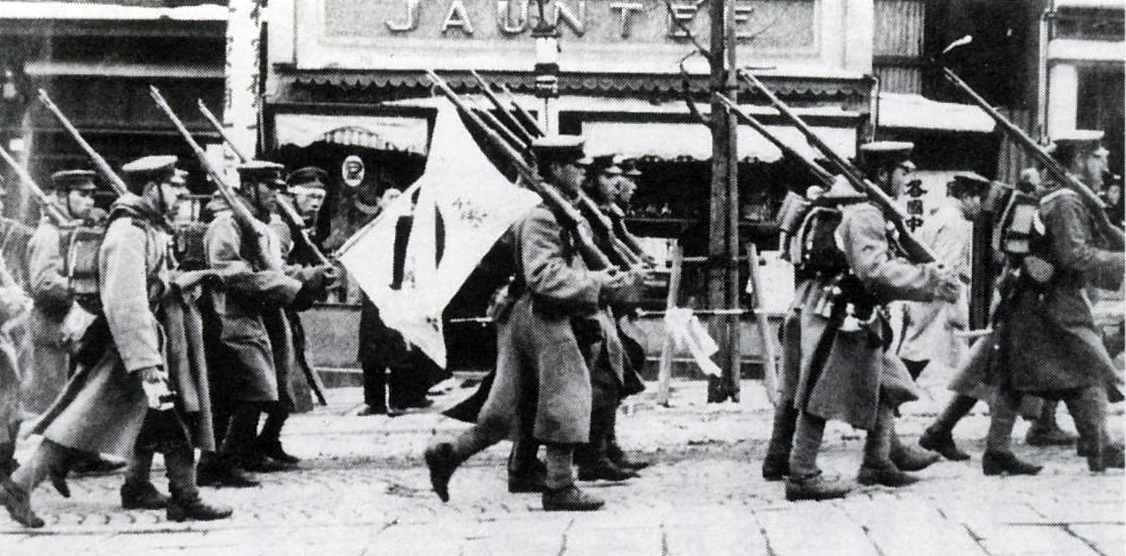
Rebel troops returning to their barracks

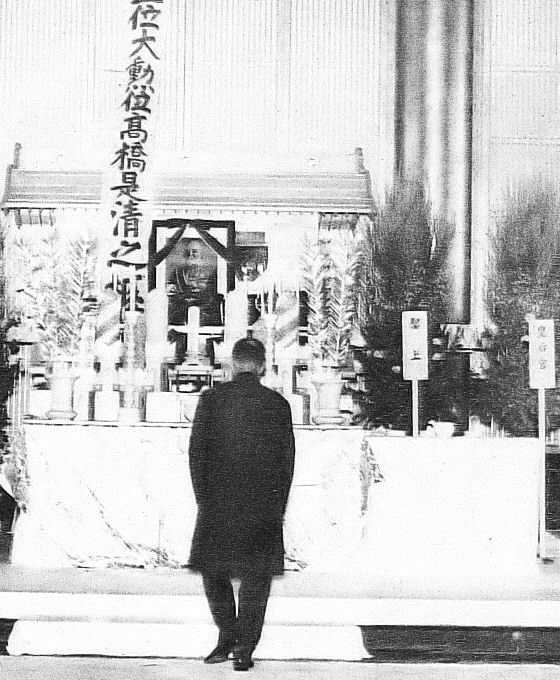
Funeral of Korekiyo Takahashi

=== Trials ===
The Emperor signed an ordinance on March 4, 1936, establishing a Special Court Martial (特設軍法会議, tokusetsu gunpō kaigi) to try those involved in the uprising. All 1,483 members of the Righteous Army were interrogated, but ultimately only 124 were prosecuted: 19 officers, 73 NCOs, 19 soldiers and ten civilians. Of them, all of the officers, 43 NCOs, three soldiers and all of the civilians were found guilty. The trials related to the uprising took nearly 18 months to complete.

The main trial of the ringleaders of the rebellion (the 19 surviving officers, Isobe, Muranaka and two other civilians) began on 28 April. The trial was held in secret, and the defendants did not have rights to legal representation, to call witnesses or appeal. The judges were not interested in hearing about the defendants' motives and intentions, and forced them to concentrate on their actions in their testimony. The trial was therefore far different from the ordinary court martial that Aizawa had faced a few months earlier. Charged with rebellion (反乱罪, hanran-zai), the rebel officers argued that their actions had been approved by the Minister of War's Proclamation and their incorporation into the martial law forces, and that they had never been formally presented with the imperial command. The verdicts were handed down on 4 June and the sentences on 5 July: all were found guilty and 17 were sentenced to death.

Four more trials took place for those directly involved in the attacks: one for those NCOs involved in the attacks on Saitō, Watanabe and Tokyo police headquarters; one for those NCOs involved in the attacks on Okada, Takahashi, Suzuki and the Ministry of War; one for the soldiers involved in those attacks; one for the NCO and six civilians involved in the attack on Makino. A series of trials were also held for 37 men charged with indirectly supporting the rebellion. Twenty-four were found guilty, with punishments ranging from life imprisonment to a fine of ¥45. The most noteworthy of them were Ichitarō Yamaguchi (life imprisonment), Ryu Saitō (five years) and Sakichi Mitsui (three years).

Kita and Nishida were also charged as ringleaders of the rebellion and tried in a separate trial. Their actions during the uprising had been only indirect (primarily providing support over the telephone), and as such, they did not actually meet the requirements of the charge. The chief judge, Major-General Isao Yoshida, protested to the Ministry of War that the charges were improper. However, the Tōsei-ha generals, who were now dominant in the IJA, had decided that the two men's influence had to be eliminated; Yoshida later wrote another judge to tell him that regardless of the lack of evidence, it had been decided that the two must die. They were sentenced to death on 14 August 1937.

The only significant military figure to be tried for involvement in the uprising was Mazaki, who was charged with collaborating with the rebel officers. Although his own testimony showed him to be guilty of the charge, he was found not guilty on 25 September 1937. This has been attributed to the influence of Fumimaro Konoe, who had become prime minister in June.

Fifteen of the officers were executed by firing squad on 15 July at a military prison in Shibuya. The execution of Muranaka and Isobe was delayed so that they could testify at Kita and Nishida's trial. Muranaka, Isobe, Kita and Nishida were executed by firing squad at the same location on 14 August 1937.

=== Change of government ===
Despite the failure of the coup, the February 26 Incident had the effect of significantly increasing the military's influence over the civilian government. The Okada cabinet resigned on 9 March and a new cabinet was formed by Kōki Hirota, Okada's foreign minister. The transition was not without its problems, however. When the selection of Hirota had been made clear, and efforts had begun to assemble a cabinet, General Hisaichi Terauchi, the new cabinet's Minister of War, made his displeasure with some of the selections clear. Hirota gave in to Terauchi's demands and changed his selections, choosing Hachirō Arita over Shigeru Yoshida as Minister of Foreign Affairs.

The interference with cabinet selection was followed by a demand that only active-duty officers be allowed to serve as Minister of War and Minister of the Navy. Until that point, reserve and retired officers had been allowed to serve in those positions. That demand was accepted and authorized by imperial commands on 18 May. The change would have far-reaching implications for the Japanese government, as it effectively gave veto power over government policies to the military services. By asking a minister to resign and refusing to appoint a new officer to serve as his replacement, the services could cause a government to fall at their pleasure. That fate would in fact meet Hirota less than a year later, when Terauchi resigned over Hirota's refusal to dissolve the Diet.

=== Personnel changes within the Army ===
Although only Mazaki faced criminal charges, the Kōdōha still suffered consequences from the incident. Under Terauchi's auspices, "reform staff officers" (革新幕僚, kakushin bakuryō), most notably Ishiwara and Akira Mutō, began a purge of the military. Of the 12 full generals in the army, nine were removed from active service by the end of April, including Kōdōha members Araki, Mazaki, Kawashima and Honjō. At the same time, other Kōdōha officers and their supporters were either removed from active service or sent to positions away from the capital, where they would be less able to influence policy. Among them were Yamashita, Kashii, Kofuji, Hori, Hashimoto and Yanagawa. Although other non-Kōdōha officers were also targeted to a limited extent, the focus of the actions was clearly on eliminating Kōdōha influence. Almost every high-ranking officer who had helped support the Righteous Army during the uprising was therefore affected.

== Commemoration ==
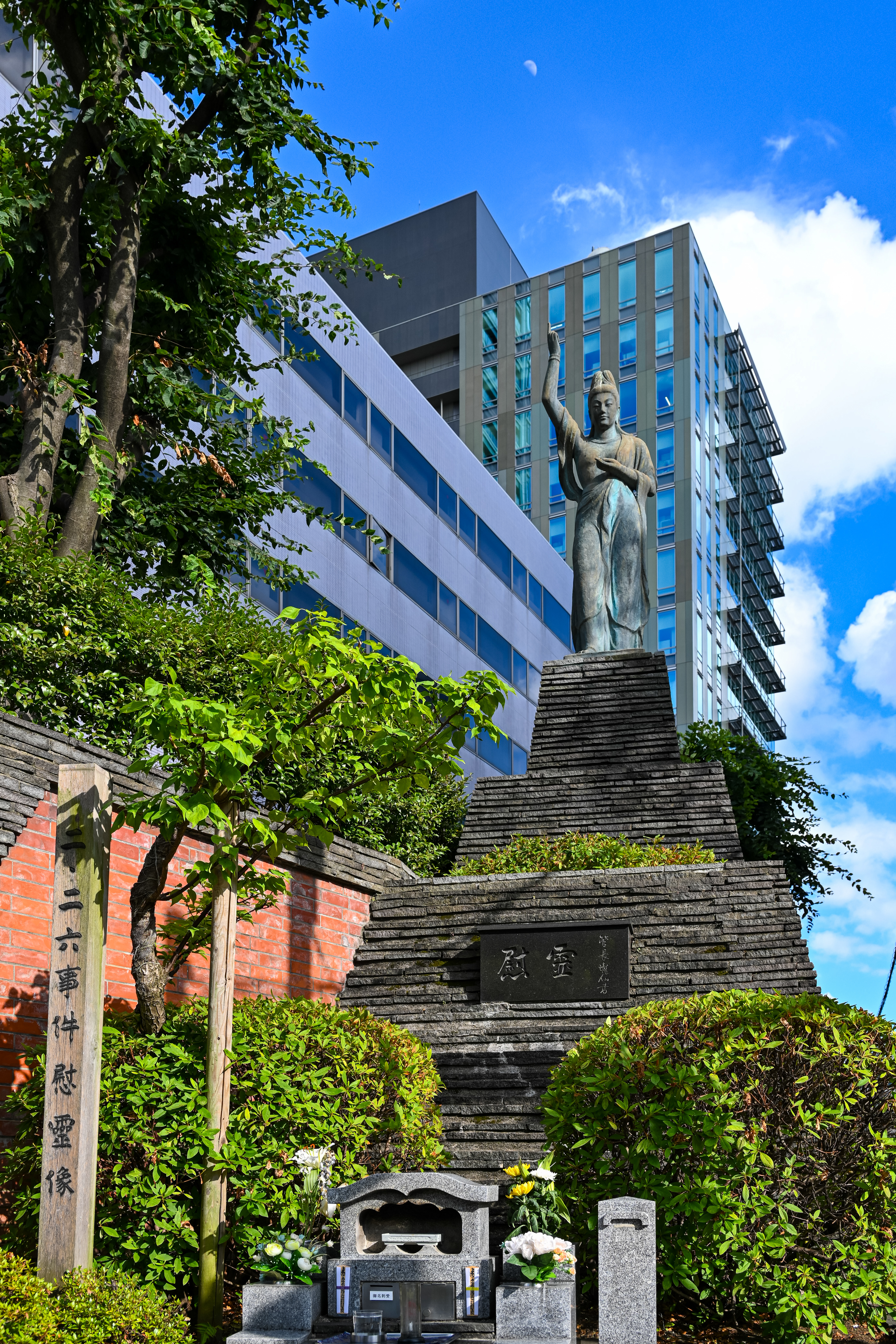
Memorial in Shibuya, Tokyo

The parents, widows, and children of the executed rebels, who were prevented by the government from commemorating them until the end of the Second World War, formed the Busshinkai (佛心会). They have established two sites in Tokyo commemorating the officers of the February 26 Incident. In 1952, shortly after the end of the Allied occupation of Japan, they placed a gravestone entitled "Grave of the Twenty-two Samurai" (二十二士之墓, nijūni-shi no haka) in Kensōji, a temple in Azabu-Jūban, where the ashes of the executed men had been placed. The "twenty-two" signifies the nineteen men executed, the two who committed suicide (Nonaka and Kōno) and Aizawa. Then, in 1965, they placed a statue of Kannon, the Buddhist goddess of mercy, dedicated to the memories of the rebel officers and their victims at the former location of the Shibuya execution grounds.
