= Notre Dame Seishin University =

Private women's college in Okayama, Japan

Coordinates: 34°40′21″N 133°54′57″E

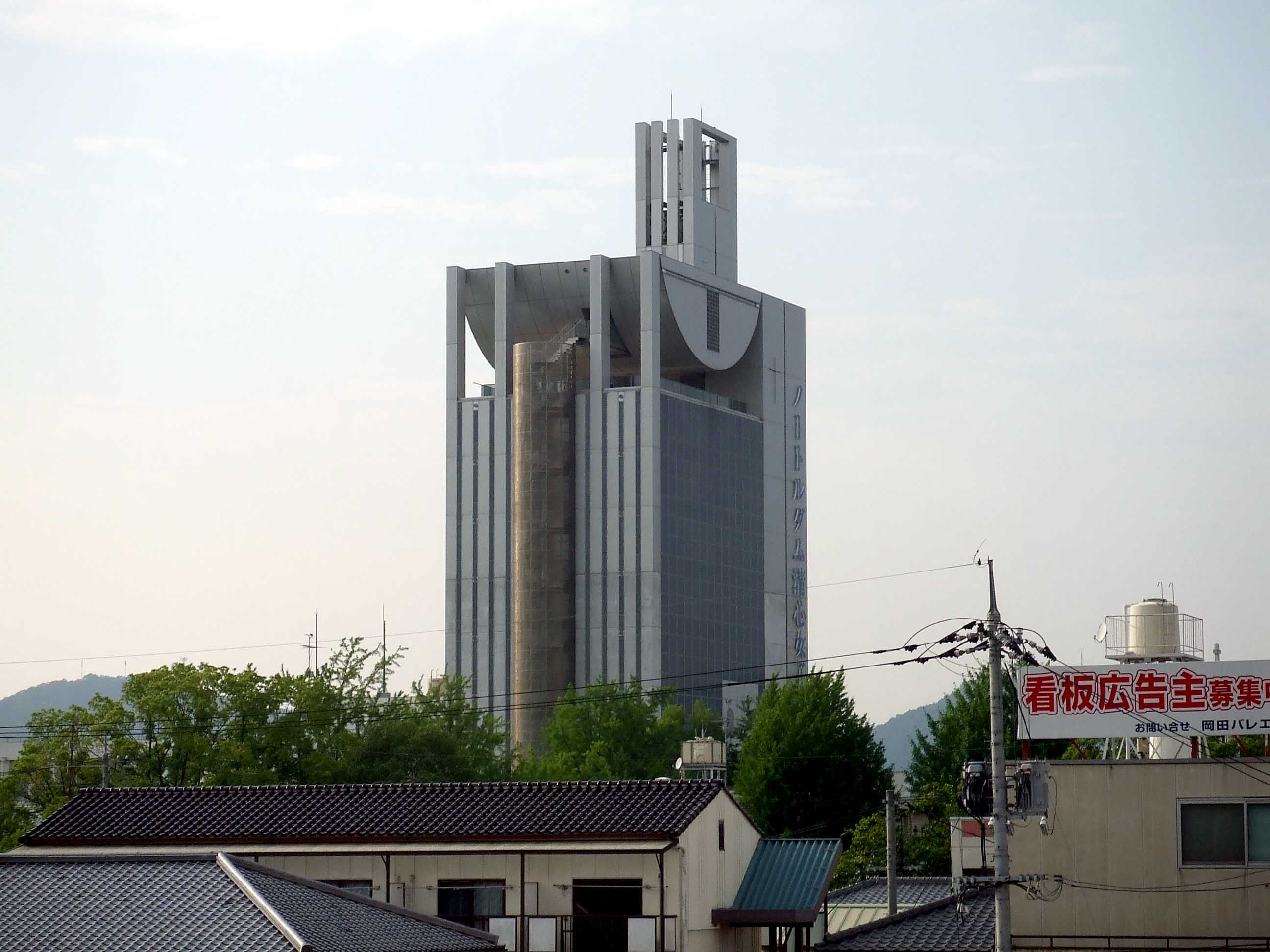
Notre Dame Seishin University

Notre Dame Seishin University (ノートルダム清心女子大学, Nohtoru damu seishin joshi daigaku; abbreviated at NDSU) is a private women's college in Okayama, Okayama, Japan, managed by the Sisters of Notre Dame de Namur. The predecessor of the school, Okayama Women's School, was founded in 1886. NDSU was chartered as a university in 1949.
