= Chinese Muslims in the Second Sino-Japanese War =

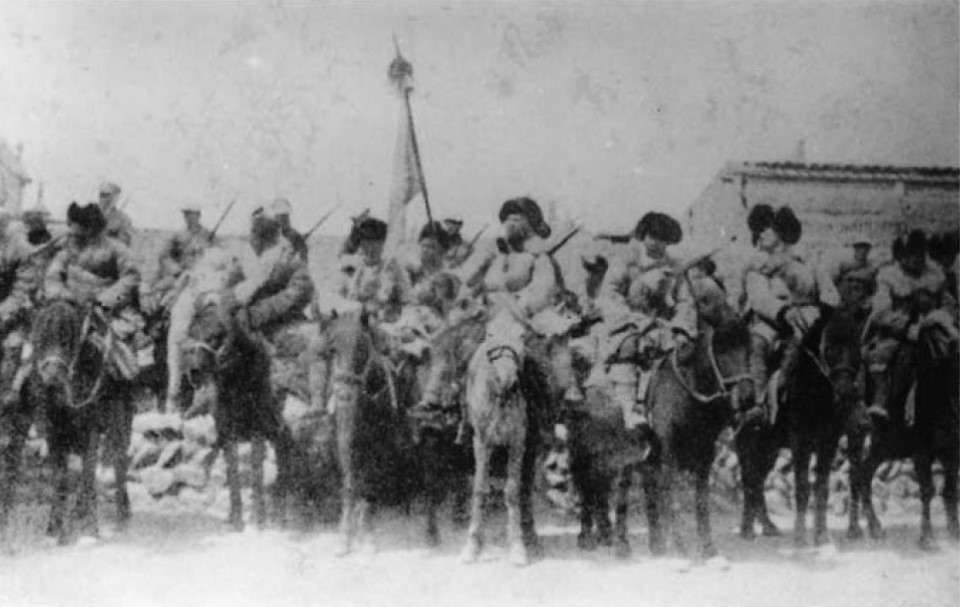
Around 1939 in Northwest China, Chinese Muslim fighters gathered to fight against the Japanese.

In the Second Sino-Japanese War, Chinese Muslims were courted by both Chinese and Japanese generals. However, they tended to fight against the Japanese, regardless of support from higher echelons of the other Chinese factions.

== Japanese atrocities committed against Hui Muslims ==
During the Second World War, the Japanese followed what has been referred to as a "killing policy" against the Hui Muslims and destroyed many mosques. According to Wan Lei, "Statistics showed that the Japanese destroyed 220 mosques and killed countless Hui people by April 1941." After the Nanjing Massacre, mosques in Nanjing were found to be filled with dead bodies. The Japanese also instituted a policy of economic oppression, which made many Hui jobless and homeless by destroying mosques and Hui communities. Other policies of deliberate humiliation included soldiers smearing mosques with pork fat, forcing Hui to butcher pigs and feed the soldiers, and forcing Hui girls to supposedly train as geishas and singers, but in fact making them serve as sex slaves. Hui cemeteries were destroyed for military reasons.

The Hui Muslim County of Dachang was subjected to slaughter. While constructing the Tokyo Mosque, the Japanese soldiers destroyed several hundred mosques and killed hundreds of thousands of Hui Muslims in China.

On 10 February 1938, the Legation Secretary of the German Embassy, Rosen, wrote to his Foreign Ministry about a film made in December by Reverend John Magee about the Nanjing Massacre, recommending its purchase. Here is an excerpt from his letter, along with a description of some of its images that are kept in the Political Archives of the Federal Foreign Office in Berlin. The Japanese killed 11 Hui Muslims in a household, as described below:

During the Japanese reign of terror in Nanking – which, by the way, continues to this day to a considerable degree – the Reverend John Magee, a member of the American Episcopal Church Mission who has been here for almost a quarter of a century, took motion pictures that eloquently bear witness to the atrocities committed by the Japanese ... One will have to wait and see whether the highest officers in the Japanese army succeed, as they have indicated, in stopping the activities of their troops, which continue even today.

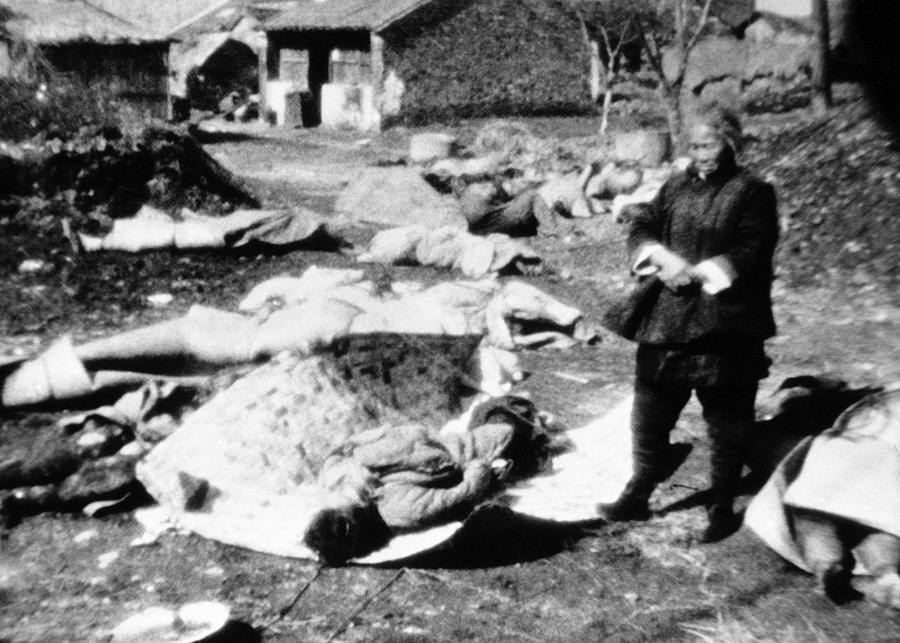
An image of the destruction brought upon by the Japanese soldiers described in the adjacent paragraph.

On December 13, about 30 soldiers came to a Chinese (Hui Muslim) house at #5 Hsing Lu Koo in the southeastern part of Nanking, and demanded entrance. The door was open by the landlord, a Mohammedan named Ha. They killed him immediately with a revolver and also Mrs. Ha, who knelt before them after Ha's death, begging them not to kill anyone else. Mrs. Ha asked them why they killed her husband and they shot her. Mrs. Hsia was dragged out from under a table in the guest hall where she had tried to hide with her 1 year old baby. After being stripped and raped by one or more men, she was bayoneted in the chest, and then had a bottle thrust into her vagina. The baby was killed with a bayonet. Some soldiers then went to the next room, where Mrs. Hsia's parents, aged 76 and 74, and her two daughters aged 16 and 14. They were about to rape the girls when the grandmother tried to protect them. The soldiers killed her with a revolver. The grandfather grasped the body of his wife and was killed. The two girls were then stripped, the elder being raped by 2–3 men, and the younger by 3. The older girl was stabbed afterwards and a cane was rammed in her vagina. The younger girl was bayoneted also but was spared the horrible treatment that had been meted out to her sister and mother. The soldiers then bayoneted another sister of between 7–8, who was also in the room. The last murders in the house were of Ha's two [Hui Muslim] children, aged 4 and 2 respectively. The older was bayoneted and the younger split down through the head with a sword.

Panglong, a Chinese Muslim town in British Burma, was entirely destroyed by the Japanese invaders during the Japanese invasion of Burma. The Hui Ma Guanggui became the leader of the Hui Panglong self-defense guard, which was created by Su, who was sent to fight against the Japanese invasion of Panglong in 1942. The Japanese destroyed Panglong, burned it, and drove out over 200 Hui households as refugees. Yunnan and Kokang received Hui refugees from Panglong who had been driven out by the Japanese. One of Ma Guanggui's nephews was Ma Yeye, a son of Ma Guanghua and he narrated the history of Panglang, including the Japanese attack. An account of the Japanese attack on the Hui in Panglong was written and published in 1998 by a Hui from Panglong in the "Panglong Booklet". The Japanese attack in Burma caused the Hui Mu family to seek refuge in Panglong, but it was driven out again to Yunnan from Panglong when the Japanese attacked Panglong.

== Middle Eastern and South Asian diplomatic tour against Japan ==
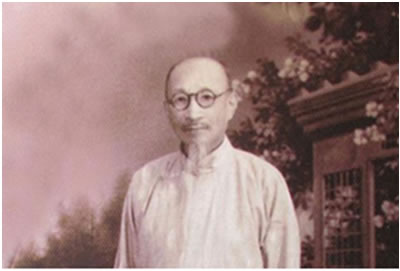
Da Pusheng (达浦生), prominent Chinese Islamic leader and educator, in Nanjing. During WWII, he toured Egypt, Saudi Arabia, and the British Raj to rally support against Japanese aggression, successfully securing significant donations from Muslim communities for China's war relief efforts.

The Hui Muslim Imam Da Pusheng toured the Middle East to confront the Japanese propagandists in Arab countries and denounce their invasion of the Islamic world. He directly confronted Japanese agents in Arab countries and challenged them in public over their propaganda. He went to the British Raj; Hejaz, Saudi Arabia; and Cairo, Egypt.

An eight-month anti-Japanese tour to spread awareness of the war in Muslim nations was undertaken by a Shanghai imam, Da Pusheng.

Misinformation on the war was spread in the Middle Eastern nations by Japanese agents. In response, in the World Islamic Congress in Hejaz, Du openly confronted fake Muslim Japanese agents and exposed them as non-Muslims. Du explained Japan's history of imperialism to his fellow Muslims. Muhammad Ali Jinnah, the future founder of Pakistan, met with Du. The anti-Japanese war effort in China received a pledge of support from Jinnah.

Du participated in Chengda.

The anti-Japanese tour took place in 1938 in the Middle East by Da. From 1938 to 1948, Da served on China's National Military Council. In 1923, he completed his education at Al-Azhar. China's Four Great Imams counted him as one of their members.

To gain backing for China in Muslim countries, Egypt, Syria, and Turkey were visited by a Hui Muslim, Ma Fuliang, and a Uyghur Muslim, Isa Yusuf Alptekin, in 1939. The Hindu leaders Tagore and Gandhi and the Muslim leader Jinnah discussed the war with the Chinese Muslim delegation under Ma Fuliang, and in Turkey, İsmet İnönü met with the Chinese Muslim delegation. Newspapers in China reported the visit. Ma Fuliang and Isa were working for Zhu Jiahua.

The bombing of Chinese Muslims by the warplanes of the Japanese was reported in the newspapers of Syria. Afghanistan, Iran, Iraq, Syria, and Lebanon were all visited by the delegation. The Foreign Minister, Prime Minister, and President of Turkey met with the Chinese Muslim delegation when it came via Egypt in May 1939. Gandhi and Jinnah met with the Hui Ma Fuliang and the Uyghur Isa Alptekin, as they denounced Japan.

Ma Fuliang, Isa Alptekin, Wang Zengshan, Xue Wenbo, and Lin Zhongming all went to Egypt to denounce Japan in front of the Arab and the Islamic words.

Ma Fuliang was part of the Chinese Muslim Association.

Anti-Japanese sentiment was spread by the Hui Muslim delegation under Wang Zengshan in Turkey through the Turkish media, as the Hui Muslims denounced the Japanese invaders. During a meeting of ambassadors in Turkey, the Japanese ambassador was forced to be silent after being told to stay quiet by the Soviet ambassador when the Japanese tried to insinuate that the Hui representatives did not represent ordinary Muslims.

== Jihad against Japan ==
In Shanghai, the Islamic School's directors were hostile to the incitement of subversion, which was motivated by a desire to instigate trouble between Muslims and the government-supported Japanese agent.

The Guangxi Clique included Bai Chongxi, who founded a pan-Muslim organization.

Japan's attempt to get the Muslim Hui people on its side failed because many generals such as Bai Chongxi, Ma Hongbin, Ma Hongkui, and Ma Bufang were Hui and fought against the Imperial Japanese Army. The Japanese attempted to approach Ma Bufang but could not reach an agreement with him. He ended up supporting the anti-Japanese Imam Hu Songshan, who prayed for the destruction of the Japanese. Ma became chairman (governor) of Qinghai in 1938 and commanded an army group. He had been appointed because of his anti-Japanese inclinations and was such an obstruction to Japanese agents who were trying to contact the Tibetans that he was called an "adversary" by a Japanese agent.

A Zhengzhou-based Muslim youth corps launched assaults against the Japanese in Anhui, Shanxi, and Henan.

The anti-Japanese Kuomintang maintained the allegiance of the Ma Clique.

The Hui Yang Jingyu was killed in action while he was fighting the Japanese.

The Dungans (Hui people who migrated to the Turkic regions of the Russian Empire) had anti-Japanese sentiment.

Ma Biao, a Muslim general who led Muslim cavalry to fight against the Japanese during the Second Sino-Japanese War, had fought during the Boxer Rebellion under General Ma Haiyan as a private at the Battle of Peking against the Eight-Nation Alliance, which included the Japanese. "恨不得馬踏倭鬼，給我已死先烈雪仇，與後輩爭光"。"I am eager to stomp on the dwarf devils (a derogatory term for Japanese), I will give vengeance for the already-dead martyrs, achieving glory with the younger generation," said by Ma Biao with reference to his service in the Boxer Rebellion during which he had fought the Japanese before the Second World War.

In 1937, when the Japanese attack at the Battle of Beiping–Tianjin began, the Chinese government was notified by Muslim General Ma Bufang in a telegram message that he was prepared to bring the fight to the Japanese. Immediately after the Marco Polo Bridge Incident, Ma Bufang arranged for a cavalry division under Muslim General Ma Lu 馬祿 and another cavalry division under the Muslim General Ma Biao to be sent eastward to fight the Japanese. Ethnic Turkic Salar Muslims made up the majority of the first cavalry division that was sent by Ma Bufang. Ma Biao annihilated the Japanese at the Battle of Huaiyang.

When the Japanese asked the Muslim General Ma Hongkui to defect and to become head of a Muslim puppet state under the Japanese, Ma responded through Zhou Baihuang, the Ningxia Secretary of the Kuomintang to remind the Japanese military chief of staff Itagaki Seishiro that many of his relatives fought and died in battle against Eight-Nation Alliance forces during the Battle of Peking during the Boxer Rebellion, including his uncle Ma Fulu, and that since Japanese troops had made up the majority of the Alliance forces, there would be no co-operation with the Japanese.

Even before the war had begun, the Chinese Muslim General Ma Zhanshan was fighting and severely mauling the Japanese Army in Manchuria. The Japanese officer Doihara Kenji approached him in an attempt to persuade him to defect. He pretended to defect to the Japanese, used the money that they had given him to rebuild his army, and fought them again by leading a guerrilla campaign in Suiyuan. The Japanese themselves noted that Chiang Kai-shek relied upon Muslim generals like Ma Zhanshan and Bai Chongxi during the war. British telegrams from the British Raj in 1937 said that Chinese-speaking Muslims like Ma Zhongying and Ma Hushan had reached an agreement with the Soviets, whom they had fought. As the Japanese had begun full-scale warfare with China, the Tungans, led by Ma Zhongying and Ma Hushan, helped the Chinese forces battle Japan. The Soviets released Ma Zhongying, and he and Ma Hushan returned to Gansu. Sven Hedin wrote that Ma Hushan would "certainly obey the summons" to help China against Japan in the war.

In 1937, the Chinese government picked up intelligence that the Japanese planned a puppet Hui Muslim country around Suiyuan and Ningxia and that they had sent agents to the region.

The Japanese planned to invade Ningxia from Suiyuan in 1939 and to create a Hui puppet state. The next year, the Japanese were defeated by the Kuomintang Muslim General Ma Hongbin, which caused their plan to collapse. Ma Hongbin's Hui Muslim troops launched further attacks against Japan at the Battle of West Suiyuan. Muslim Generals Ma Hongkui and Ma Hongbin defended west Suiyuan, especially at the Battle of Wuyuan in 1940. Ma Hongbin commanded the 81st Corps and suffered heavy casualties but eventually repulsed the Japanese and defeated them.

The Japanese attempted to justify their invasion to the Muslim Chinese by promises of liberation and self-determination. Chinese Muslims rejected that, and jihad (Islamic struggle) was declared to be obligatory and sacred for all Chinese Muslims against Japan. The Yuehua, a Chinese Muslim publication, quoted the Qur'an and the Hadith to justify submitting to Chiang Kai-Shek as the leader of China and as justification for jihad in the war against Japan. Xue Wenbo, a Muslim Hui Chengda School member wrote the "Song of the Hui with an anti-Japanese determination". A Chinese Muslim Imam, Hu Songshan, was instrumental in his support of the war. When Japan invaded China in 1937, Hu Songshan ordered for the Chinese flag to be saluted during morning prayer, along with an exhortation to nationalism. He invoked Qur'anic authority to urge sacrifice against Japan. A prayer was written by him in Arabic and Chinese for the defeat of the Japanese and the support of the Kuomintang Chinese government. Hu Songshan also ordered for all Imams in Ningxia to preach Chinese nationalism. The Muslim General Ma Hongkui assisted him in that order by making nationalism required at every mosque. Hu Songshan led the Ikhwan, the Chinese Muslim Brotherhood, which became a Chinese nationalist patriotic organization that stressed education and independence of the individual. Ma Hushan, a Chinese Muslim General of the 36th Division (National Revolutionary Army), spread anti-Japanese propaganda in Xinjiang and pledged his support to the Kuomintang. Westerners reported that the Tungans were anti-Japanese and that under their rule, areas were covered with "most of the stock anti-Japanese slogans from China proper," and Ma made "Resistance to Japanese Imperialism" part of his governing doctrine. The China Islamic Association issued "A message to all Muslims in China from the Chinese Islamic Association for National Salvation" during Ramadan in 1940:

We have to implement the teaching "the love of the fatherland is an article of faith" by Muhammad and to inherit the Hui's glorious history in China. In addition, let us reinforce our unity and participate in the twice more difficult task of supporting a defensive war and promoting religion.... We hope that ahongs [imams] and the elite will initiate a movement of prayer during Ramadan and implement group prayer to support our intimate feeling toward Islam. A sincere unity of Muslims should be developed to contribute power towards the expulsion of Japan.

The saying "patriotism is part of iman [faith]" was quoted by Chinese Muslims like Ma Hongdao during the war against Japan. He believed that the Hui were not an ethnic minority but only a religious minority and supported Chinese nationalism without ethnic divisions, and the idea of Zhonghua minzu (Chinese nation) against domestic and foreign imperialist enemies. He took his ideas on nationalism from Turkists like Gökalp.

The Sufi scholar Zhang Chengzhi noted that during the war, Hui Muslims were suspicious of the intentions of Japanese researchers and deliberately concealed important religious information from them when they were interviewed.

During the war against Japan, the Imams supported Muslim resistance in battle, calling for Muslims to participate in the jihad against Japan and become shahids (martyrs). Later in the war, Ma Bufang sent cavalry divisions led by General Ma Biao that were composed of Hui, Dongxiang Mongols, and Salars, all of whom were Muslim, as well as Han and Tibetans (Buddhists), to fight Japan. Ma Hongkui seized the city of Dingyuanying in Suiyuan and arrested the Mongol prince Darijaya (Wade-Giles: Ta Wang) in 1938, because Doihara Kenji, a Japanese officer of the Kwantung Army, had visited the prince. Darijaya was exiled to Lanzhou until 1944. At the Battle of Wuyuan, the Hui Muslim cavalry, led by Ma Hongbin and Ma Buqing, defeated the Japanese troops. Ma Hongbin was also involved in the offensive against the Japanese at the Battle of West Suiyuan.

The Muslim Generals Ma Hongkui and Ma Bufang protected Lanzhou with their cavalry troops and put up such a resistance that the Japanese never captured Lanzhou during the war. Ma Bufang sent the Muslim Brigade Commander, Major General Ma Buluan (马步銮), who led the 1st Regiment of the Nationalist Reorganized 8th Cavalry Brigade, which was originally known as the 1st Cavalry Division and later renamed the 8th Cavalry Division during the war. The brigade was stationed in eastern Henan and fought a number of battles against the Japanese invaders, who grew to fear the nationalist cavalry unit and called it "Ma's Islamic Division".

The Qinghai Chinese, Salar, Chinese Muslim, Dongxiang, and Tibetan troops, whom Ma Bufang had sent under General Ma Biao, fought to the death against the Japanese Army or committed suicide, instead of surrendering. When they defeated the Japanese, the Muslim troops killed all of them except for a few prisoners, who were sent back to Qinghai to prove that the Chinese had won. In September 1940, when the Japanese made an offensive against the Muslim Qinghai troops, the Muslims ambushed the Japanese and forced them to retreat. Ma Biao was a relative of Ma Budang, who was the eldest son of Ma Haiqing, who was the sixth younger brother of Ma Haiyan, the grandfather of Ma Bufang.

The stature of Ma Biao rose over his role in the Qinghai–Tibet War, and later in 1937, his battles against the Japanese propelled him to fame nationwide in China. The control of China over the border area of Kham and Yushu with Tibet was guarded by the Qinghai army. Chinese Muslim schools used the victory in the war against Tibet to show how they defended the integrity of China's territory, as it had been put into danger since the Japanese invasion.

In the town of Huangzhong, in Qinghai, a journalist sat in a classroom of a literacy school in 1937. One student said, "I am a Qinghai person from China. No... wait, I am a Chinese person from Qinghai" after he had been asked about his nationality by the teacher. The teacher mentioned the Japanese invasion and that they were all being attacked were all brothers and Chinese.

On this morning in 1937 a reporter was observing a class at the masses literacy school in Huangzhong. The teacher called on a twenty-three-year old student and asked what nationality he was. "I am a Qinghai person from China. No... wait, I am a Chinese person from Qinghai". The teacher corrected the student, stressing that they all were Chinese, and as such, they all were brothers. And they were under attack. Everyone knew what the Japanese armies were doing, the teacher lectured. As a light rain began to fall, a student asked where the famous Commander Ma Biao was. Commander Ma Biao? He was fighting the Japanese down in the east. The cavalry from Qinghai that he commanded had fought well—killing the enemy, taking supplies, and bringing honor to all "Chinese from Qinghai". The students were not to worry. With brave soldiers like Ma Biao, the Japanese aggressors were sure to meet defeat.

— Zhi Kang, "Huangzhong Huijiao cujinhui minzhong shizichu suomiao" [Description of Huangzhong’s Islam Progressive Council’s masses literacy school], Xin xibei 2.1 (1937), 121–122., translation from Qinghai Across Frontiers : : State- and Nation-Building under the Ma Family, 1911–1949 by William Brent Haas, p. 155

A play was written and shown in 1936 to Qinghai's Islam Progressive Council Schools by Shao Hongsi during the war against Tibet. The role of Ma Biao appeared in which he defeated the Tibetans. The play presented Ma Biao and Ma Bufang as heroes, who prevented Yushu from being lost to the Tibetans, and compared the situation to Japanese invasion of Manchuria by noting that the Muslims stopped the same scenario from happening in Yushu. Ma Biao and his fight against the Japanese were hailed at the schools of the Islam Progressive Council of Qinghai. Military training in schools and the efforts to defend China were emphasized in a Muslim magazine Kunlun. In 1939, Ma's battles against the Japanese led to recognition if him across China.

After World War II, the unit returned to Qinghai and was reorganized as the 1st Regiment of the Reorganized 8th Cavalry Brigade of the Nationalist Reorganized 82nd Division.

Xining, the capital of Qinghai, was subjected to aerial bombardment by Japanese warplanes in 1941. The bombing spurred all ethnicities in Qinghai, including the local Qinghai Mongols and Qinghai Tibetans, against the Japanese. The Salar Muslim General Han Youwen directed the defense of the city of Xining during the air raids by Japanese planes. Han survived an aerial bombardment by Japanese planes in Xining while he was being directed via telephone from Ma Bufang, who hid in an air raid shelter in military barracks. The bombing resulted in human flesh splattering a Blue Sky with a White Sun flag and Han being buried in rubble. Han Youwen was dragged out of the rubble while he was bleeding, but he managed to grab a machine gun. Although he was limping, he fired back at the Japanese warplanes and cursed the Japanese as dogs in his native Salar language.

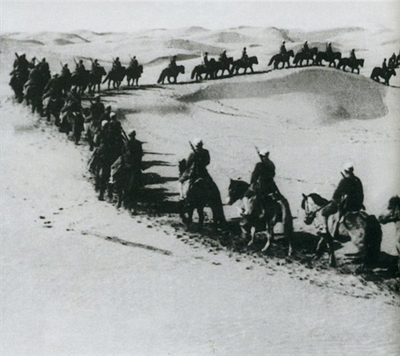
Chinese Muslim Cavalry

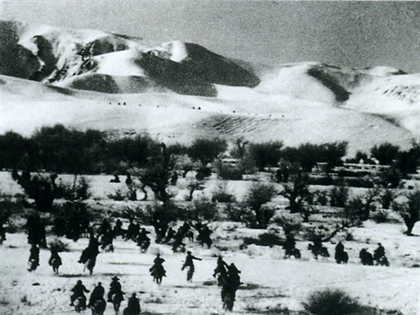
Chinese Muslim soldiers

Chiang Kai-Shek also suspected that the Tibetans were collaborating with the Japanese. Under orders from the Kuomintang government, Ma Bufang repaired the Yushu airport to prevent Tibetan separatists from formally declaring de jure independence. Chiang also ordered Ma to put his Muslim soldiers on alert for entry into Tibet in 1942. Ma Bufang complied and moved several thousand troops to the border with Tibet. Chiang also threatened the Tibetans with bombing if they did not comply. Ma Bufang was openly hostile to the Tibetan Ngolok peoples. His Muslim troops launched what David S. G. Goodman calls "a campaign of ethnic cleansing" in Tibetan Ngolok areas in Qinghai during the war and destroyed their Tibetan Buddhist temples.

During the war, the American Asiatic Association published an entry in Asia: journal of the American Asiatic Association, Volume 40, concerning the question of whether Chinese Muslims were Chinese or a separate "ethnic minority." It addressed the issue of whether all Muslims in China were united into one race. It came to the conclusion that the Japanese military spokesman was the only person who was propagating the false assertion that "Chinese Mohammedans" had "racial unity." The Japanese claim was disproved when it became known that Muslims in China were composed of a multitude of races, as separate from one another as were the "Germans and English", such as the Mongol Hui of Hezhou, Salar Hui of Qinghai, Chan Tou Hui of Turkistan, and Chinese Muslims. The Japanese were trying to spread the false claim that Chinese Muslims were one race to propagate the claim that they should be separated from China into an "independent political organization."

The Chinese Kuomintang also sought the Khampas' help in defending Sichuan from Japan, since the temporary capital was there. A Khampa member of the Mongolian Tibetan Academy was Han Jiaxiang.

== See also ==
- Chinese Muslim Association
- Islam in Taiwan
