= Battle of Baotou =

1939 battle of the Second Sino-Japanese War

- Part of the 1939–1940 Winter Offensive in the Second Sino-Japanese War
Date	17–24 December 1939 (1 week)
Location	Baotou city, Suiyuan province, Inner Mongolia region, Republic of China
Result	Japanese victory

Belligerents
China	Japan; Mengjiang

Commanders and leaders
Fu Zuoyi; Dong Qiwu; Yuan Qingrong; Sun Lanfeng; Ma Hongbin	Kojima Yoshizo; Nagaru Kumagawa; Wang Ying

Casualties and losses
According to commander Fu Zuoyi's report on 10th January 1940 : 61 officers and 571 soldiers killed 106 officers and 807 soldiers wounded According to history of the Anti-Japanese War : more than 1,800 casualties	Chinese claim : more than 3,000 casualties Japanese claim for Japanese losses : 11 officers and 196 NCOs and soldiers killed 30 officers and 464 NCOs and soldiers wounded Mengjiang losses : unknown

The Battle of Baotou (Chinese: 包头战役 baotou zhanyi) was fought from 17 to 24 December 1939 in Suiyuan Province, Republic of China as part of the Second Sino-Japanese War. Taking place in the Eighth War Area in Northern China, the engagement was part of the wider 1939–1940 Winter Offensive by the National Revolutionary Army.

Aiming to delay the Japanese advance, initial fighting began on 17 December, leading to the siege of Baotou. During the siege up to half of the city was captured by the Chinese. However, with the arrival of Japanese reinforcements, the Chinese army withdrew. This battle laid the groundwork for the subsequent Western Suiyuan campaign.

== Background ==
The battle was primarily a diversionary attack planned by Fu Zuoyi to relieve pressure on other sectors of the front.

== Armies ==
=== The Imperial Japanese Army ===
Japan had formed a Mongolian Garrison Corps on 8 January 1938 to protect the newly acquired regions along the Zhangjiakou-Datong-Baotou line. Alongside this was a Cavalry Corps headquartered in Baotou and led by Lieutenant General Kojima Yoshizo. The force comprised a Horse Artillery Regiment under the command of Lieutenant Colonel Nagaru Kumagawa, a Cavalry Company, an Independent Tank Team, a rapid-fire Artillery Unit, and two Mongolian Army Divisions alongside more than a hundred gendarmes and partisans. Stationed nearby at Guyang was Ogami Shigeru's Cavalry Brigade and the 8th Division of the Mengjiang Army.

Further to this was the Western Suiyuan Autonomous Allied Army commanded by Wang Ying. This force had been organised on orders of the Japanese in 1939. Three Cavalry Divisions under the command of Chen Bingyi, Wang Biaozi, and Chang Ziyi were stationed in the area of Gongmiaozi to the west of Baotou.

=== The National Revolutionary Army ===
The offensive was centered around the 35th Army under Fu Zuoyi, veterans of the Battle of Taiyuan. The Army was initially composed of the 73rd and 101st Divisions. However, the 73rd was sent to Shanxi, replaced by the 31st and 32nd New Divisions.

Supporting the 35th were local units of the 81st Army, the 6th Cavalry Army, the 3rd and 4th New Cavalry Divisions, the 5th and 6th New Brigades, as well as Guerrilla Forces.

== The battle ==
=== Opening stages ===
Fu Zuoyi's orders for the battle were as follows:

1. Our army shall attack the enemy in Baotou with a long-distance surprise attack to achieve the purpose of completely annihilating the defenders and occupying the city. We will make preparations for a battle and a siege of the city, and will advance towards the enemy in Baotou. On December 20, a siege shall be carried out at the Baotou city.

2. Men Bingyue's 6th Cavalry Division shall cross the Yellow River at Maqi Crossing, pass through the Southern Yimeng area, and advance between Sa County and Guisui on December 20. They will sabotage the Ping-Sui Railway, using guerrilla warfare to contain the enemy and prevent reinforcements to Baotou. Senior Staff Officer Miao Yutian shall be sent to accompany the army to maintain contact with headquarters.

3. Sun Lanfeng, the commander of the New 31st Division, will lead the left column to Baotou along the Bao-Wu North Road. He will be supported by the Provisional Police Brigade, Yu Linrui's regiment, and the 1st Mountain Artillery Battalion.

4. Yuan Qingrong's, commander of the New 32nd Division, will lead the right column to Baotou along the Bao-Wu South Road, meeting up with the left column in Baotou. He will be supported by a battalion of mountain artillery.

5. Dong Qiwu's 101st Division, supported by a battalion of mountain artillery will serve as the left column's rear-guard.

6. Brigade Commander Ma Fengchen of the Suiyuan Guerrilla Army shall secretly lead four regiments to the Ula Mountain north of Baotou during the night. If the enemy in Baotou leaves the city to fight with the army west of Baotou, these brigades will occupy Baotou.

7. Wang Zixiu's New Sixth Brigade shall advance to the Dashetai-Baoutou Road to harass and delay Japanese reinforcements from Dashetai.

8. Ma Hongbin, commander of the 81st Army, shall lead his troops along the line from Wuzhen and Wuliangsuhai to Xishanzui to guard the Houtao area.

On December 17, the 6th Cavalry Army, under the command of Men Bingyue, crossed the Yellow River and defeated the Mengjiang troops to the East and West of Laozangyingzi. They then destroyed the Ping-Sui Railway as planned. On the 18th, the 6th Cavalry Division attacked the Japanese Army over a 180 Hectare front. The following night, they launched a surprise attack on the Japanese troops stationed in Salazi. Meanwhile, the 81st Army of Ma Hongbing guarded the Houtao area. On the afternoon of the 18th, Fu Zuoyi twice dispatched the chief of staff, Lieutenant Colonel Wang Xing and Staff Officer Captain Jin Shuko to liaise with the New 31st Division, confirming that the operation would begin on the night of the 19th.

After learning of the movements of the Chinese 6th Cavalry Army, Japanese Army Group Commander Kojima Yoshizan dispatched most of his Cavalry Group, commanded by Kumagawa Nagaru, late on the night of December 19. With five tanks in the vanguard, the Force was sent to engage Ma Bingyue's 6th Cavalry Army. In the early morning of December 20, after Kumagawa's force had left Baotou, the National Revolutionary Army's 2nd and 3rd Battalions of the 93rd Regiment of the New 31st Division entered north-eastern Baotou. Led by Regimental attaché Lt. Col. Feng Zi, they had bypassed the bunkers and barbed wire on the night of the 19th and entered the city. Early on the 20th, Colonel An Chunshan, the commander of the 93rd Regiment, directed its 1st Battalion, commanded by Wang Youliang, to advance on the northwest gate of Baotou City. Finding the gate garrisoned, the Battalion changed plan and the battalion scaled the northwest corner of the wall, known as Shuiba Cave.

The 1st Company of the 1st Battalion set up ladders to the city wall having crossed the outer ditch. As the troops began to scale the wall, two Mengjiang soldiers spotted the attackers. The two soldiers then surrendered, allowing the attackers to enter the city without casualties. With information from the two surrendered Mongolian soldiers, the battalion quickly launched an attack on the Japanese soldiers stationed at the northwest gate, killing more than 20 and capturing the gate. This skirmish alerted the sleeping Japanese to the invasion. The Japanese quickly manned the bunkers across the city. At the same time, a Mengjiang force stationed outside the city at Xiyingpan also began to attack the northwest gate. They attempted to encircle the 1st Battalion but their attack was halted by a squad led by Captain Yao Dezeng. Following this, the Mengjiang soldiers sent a delegation to indicate they would not engage further in the battle, and offered 20 cases of ammunition. This ended the threat of encirclement an allowed An Chunshan to concentrate the 1st Battalion on the rapid capture of the Japanese munitions stores.

In this time, the 91st Regiment of the New 31st Division and the 1st Regiment of the 5th Provisional Police Brigade assembled at the north of the city and, with the support of two battalions of the 93rd Regiment, began their attack on the city. Artillery under the command of Major General Liu Zhenheng took up positions near Huangcaowa and set up a command post. The 1st Regiment of the 5th Provisional Police Brigade under Major Liang Banchi was the first to enter the city. Soon after, the main force of the 91st Regiment, having accepted the surrender of the Mengjiang soldiers, followed the 1st Regiment of the 5th Provisional Police Brigade into the city. By noon, two companies of the 1st Battalion of the 91st Regiment led by Captains Cui Jianxin and Linghu Li joined the assault. The two battalions led by Lt. Col. Feng Zi of the 93rd Regiment were stuck at the northeast corner and failed to enter the city because the trench outside the city was too wide to cross. Instead, the battled Mengjiang forces outside the city.

=== Japanese counterattack ===
Japanese command was initially unaware of the attack, and Commander Kojima was taken by complete surprise. However, the Chinese attack was disorganized and poorly coordinated. Timings were inconsistent, reducing the strength of each assault. This allowed the Japanese time to recover and reorganize. Only one battalion of the 93rd Regiment entered the city, the other two were stuck outside, and lost contact with headquarters. The commanders of the 1st Regiment of the 5th Provisional Police Brigade and the 91st Regiment did not personally enter the city to command the battle. This confusion allowed the Japanese troops time to enter their fortifications and use their superior firepower to stall the Chinese Army's attack. Just as the New 31st Division launched their assault, the Japanese Cavalry Group Command made contact with the Mengjiang Garrison Command in Zhangjiakou. However, when the commander, Lt. Gen. Naosaburo Okabe, asked if reinforcements were needed, the Cavalry Group replied that they had already notified the 1st Cavalry Brigade stationed in Sa County of the need for reinforcements and that there was no need to dispatch other reinforcements.

At 10:00 a.m. on December 20, due to the varying progress of the attacking units and the fact that some units had not broken through the city walls, as well as the fact that the 1st Regiment of the 5th Provisional Police Brigade, which was attached for the operation, was unfamiliar with the 35th Army's chain of command, the commander of the New 31st Division, Maj. Gen. Sun Lanfeng, ordered deputy divisional commander Maj. Gen. Wang Leizhen to enter the city and command the operations as the front-line commander in order to unify the command of the siege troops. However, Deputy Divisional Commander Wang did not enter the city after receiving the order, but only set up a temporary command headquarters outside the city to direct the troops outside the city to fight against the Puppet Army. He ordered Colonel An Chunshan, the commander of the 93rd Regiment who had already entered the city, to unify the command of the troops who had entered the city, and dispatched the 3rd Battalion of the 92nd Regiment into the city as reinforcement. At this time, the troops who had already entered the city included the 1st Battalion of the 93rd Regiment, two companies of the 1st Battalion of the 91st Regiment, the 3rd Battalion of the 93rd Regiment, and a part of the 1st Regiment of the 5th Provisional Police Brigade.

After gaining unified command, An Chunshan quickly contacted the various troops inside the city. He deployed the battalions and companies on the line from Qianjie to Jinlongwang Temple and launched fierce street fighting with the Japanese troops in the city. At this time, the Japanese army, relying on their advantages of being well-trained and well-equipped, quickly entered the bunkers set up at various street corners to put up resistance. The fighting inside the city was very fierce and the progress of the Chinese Army was hindered. At 3:00 p.m. on the 20th, under the command of Regimental Commander An Chunshan, the troops which had entered the city pushed the Japanese troops to the southeast corner of the city and raised the national flag. After learning that the Chinese army entered the city, the local Baotou citizens rushed to offer tea and water to comfort the Chinese troops. However, due to the complex configuration of Japanese bunkers in the southeast corner and the fierce fire pinning them down, the Chinese troops who had entered the city were never able to occupy the southeast corner. The Japanese also organized troops to launch several counterattacks, and the battle turned into a tug-of-war state.

In order to speed up the attack, Sun Shimin of the New 31st division ordered the 3rd Battalion of the 92nd Regiment in reserve into battle to strengthen the attack power of the troops in the city. However, he did not expect that the Kumagawa Expeditionary Force of the Japanese Army, which had left the city in the early morning to look for the main force of the Chinese army, to rush back to Baotou at the same time and fought with the Chinese army outside the northwest gate of Baotou city. This sudden incident plunged the Chinese and Japanese armies into a melee. While fierce fighting was going on inside and outside Baotou City, Major General Katagiri Shigeru, commander of the 1st Cavalry Brigade of the Japanese Army, ordered two cavalry regiments to reinforce Baotou from Guyang and Anbei.

=== Siege of the city and attacking the reinforcements ===
At about 4:00 p.m. on the 20th, the 1st Cavalry Brigade of the Japanese Army and its direct subordinate troops broke into the city of Baotou and successfully joined the defenders. The 13th Cavalry Regiment in Guyang was reinforced by a battalion led by its commander, Colonel Kazuaki Obara. When it reached the Sanhehao area, it encountered stubborn resistance from the 92nd Regiment of the New 31st Division and the 1st Brigade of the Suiyuan Guerrilla Army of the Chinese Army. The Japanese Army used tanks to open the way and advance step by step. The position of the 2nd Battalion of the 92nd Regiment commanded by Colonel Yu Chuanyi was almost broken through by the Japanese Army. Yu Chuanyi urgently contacted the division headquarters by phone, hoping for reinforcements. At this time, General Fu Zuoyi personally visited the headquarters of the New 31st Division to inspect the battle situation and proposed to change the policy from "besieging the city and attacking the reinforcements" to "defending the city and attacking the reinforcements". Captain Jin Shuke, his staff officer, informed Yu Chuanyi of Fu Zuoyi's intention after receiving a call from Captain Yu. Captain Yu immediately expressed his determination to hold the position and dealt a heavy blow to the reinforcement of the 13th Cavalry Regiment of the Chinese Army. Regimental commander Osamu was also seriously wounded in the battle and was rescued and taken back to Guyuan by his subordinates. The remnants of more than 300 troops, under the command of a battalion commander, desperately advanced towards Baotou. On the early morning of the 21st, the Japanese troops rushed to the northwest gate of Baotou City, but were blocked by the north gate defenders of the 93rd Regiment and the northwest gate defenders of the 91st Regiment of the New 31st Division of the Chinese Army, and were forced to retreat to the moat outside the northwest gate to hold their ground. At this time, the New 31st Division sent Divisional Chief of Staff Colonel Song Haichao to lead an artillery company into the city to support the battle. When Chief of Staff Song saw the remnants of the Japanese troops in the moat, he immediately sent men to contact the 93rd Regiment on the city wall. Artillery fire suppressed the Japanese troops first, then the 93rd Regiment launched an infantry charge, completely annihilating them. The Japanese 14th Cavalry Regiment from Anbei was still on its way to the battlefield because it was far away from Baotou.

When the Japanese 13th Cavalry Regiment was defeated by the Chinese army, the commander of the Japanese army in Mongolia, Naosaburo Okabe, realized the seriousness of the problem. He immediately contacted the commander of the 26th Division, Lieutenant General Shigenori Kuroda, and ordered him to send most of the 13th Cavalry Brigade and a part of the 14th Cavalry Brigade to reinforce Baotou. The remaining troops would move to Baotou one after another after they were assembled. At at the same time, he ordered the Puppet Mongolian Army near Baotou to relieve the city. After the battle inside Baotou continued into the night, Lieutenant General Kojima, commander of the Japanese cavalry group, contacted Lieutenant Colonel Kumagawa who was commanding the battle outside the city, and designated all the troops in Baotou to be under the command of Lieutenant General Katagiri Shigeru, the commander of the 1st Cavalry Brigade. He also took advantage of the Japanese army's familiarity with the terrain and formulated a plan for a night counterattack.

On the early morning of the 21st, Japanese troops under the unified command of Lieutenant General Katagiri launched a surprise attack on Chinese troops inside and outside the city, breaking through the position of the 1st Regiment of the 5th Provisional Police Brigade located on the front street of the city. Upon learning that the position had been lost, the commander of the 93rd Regiment, An Chunshan, immediately deployed his troops to launch a counterattack. After dozens of fierce battles, commander An Chunshan finally defeated the Japanese troops inside the city, while the Japanese troops located outside the city were also thwarted by the favorable counterattacks of the New 31st Division led by deputy divisional commander, Major General Wang Leizhen. In order to quickly annihilate the Japanese troops inside the city, regimental commander An Chunshan decided to launch a counterattack against the Japanese troops in the city after thwarting the Japanese army's night attack plan. However, after the attack began, the Japanese fierce fire from the bunkers prevented the Chinese troops in the city from expanding their gains. From day until night, the troops commanded by Colonel An Chunshan were still in a stalemate with the Japanese army at the front street. Only the 3rd Battalion of the 92nd Regiment, led by Major Qiu Zilin, captured the fortified compound of the Japanese army in the south of the city and completely annihilated a platoon of Japanese troops stationed in the compound. At this time, the 6th Cavalry Army, which was besieging Sa County, sent news that it had captured Sa County and destroyed the Ping-Sui Railway

Outside the city, the infantry and cavalry regiments commanded by Lieutenant Colonel Kumagawa Nagaharu attacked Liujiayaozi, the front-line command post of Deputy Divisional Commander Wang Leizhen of the New 31st Division, with more than 300 cavalrymen under the cover of two fighter planes. This Japanese unit was effectively blocked by the 5th Company of the 2nd Battalion and an artillery company led by Colonel Liu Jingxin, the commander of the 91st Regiment of the New 31st Division. The Japanese cavalry gave up frontal attacks after 4 consecutive unsuccessful charges and attempted to detour to the flank of Liujiayaozi to attack again, but was still repulsed by Liu Jingxin's troops. Seeing that the attack was ineffective, the Japanese troops turned to launch a sneak attack on the headquarters of the New 31st Division in Huangcaowa, but were once again defeated by two battalions of the 92nd Regiment of the reserve force. The remnants of more than a hundred troops returned to the east of Baotou City.

Just as the 92nd Regiment of the New 31st Division was blocking the cavalry in front of it, the 14th Cavalry Regiment of the Japanese Army was approaching Baotou. The 14th Cavalry Regiment's base in Anbei was under attack by the Chinese 81st Army at the time, so the regimental commander, Colonel Kazuo Kobayashi, did not lead all of his troops out. As he did not conduct any reconnaissance on both sides of the road, they were ambushed by the New 5th Brigade of the Chinese Army when they were approaching Baotou. The troops were almost wiped out, and Colonel Kobayashi, the regiment commander, was killed on the spot. Only the remnants of more than 100 men escaped the ambush, but when they fled to Kundoulun, they encountered the 11th Battalion of the 94th Regiment of the New 32nd Division which had just arrived at the battlefield. Due to a lack of battlefield experience, the commander of the 1st Battalion, Major Lu Leshan, tried to persuade the Japanese troops to surrender. After rejecting the request for surrender, the Japanese remnants fled back to Anbei before the 1st Battalion of the 94th Regiment was ready to fight.

The 101st Division of the Chinese Army defeated the Puppet Mongolian reinforcements in the Maogi Shenyaozi area. The 302nd Regiment, under the command of Colonel Guo Jingyun, surrounded a puppet Mongolian reinforcement in the Kundoulun area and captured more than 300 troops including regimental commander Yu Zhenyun. After being captured, the puppet regimental commander Yu Zhenweng took the initiative to successfully persuaded the puppet Mongolian army in Xinchengbao to surrender.

=== Stalemate ===
At 3:00 p.m. on December 21, two battalions of the Japanese 26th Division arrived near Baotou after breaking through the Suiyuan Guerilla Army's peripheral blockade, and launched an attack on two battalions of the 93rd Regiment of the New 31st Division at the east of the city under the cover of five fighter planes. After breaking through the defense of the two battalions, they joined forces with cavalry artillery regiment of the Kumagawa Expeditionary Force, sent half of their troops into the city to join the group headquarters, and sent the rest to directly attacked the headquarters of the New 31st Division in Huangcaowa. The other part of the force went straight to the New 31st Division's headquarters in Huangcaowa and launched an attack. At this time, apart from the troops directly under the divisional headquarters, there were only two battalions of the 92nd Regiment and the 2nd Battalion of the 94th Regiment of the New 32nd Division which had just arrived at the battlefield. As the three battalions had already suffered considerable losses in the previous attacks on the cavalry artillery regiment of the Kumagawa Expeditionary Force, they failed to stop the Japanese troops in front of them. The commander of the New 31st Division, Maj. Gen. Sun Lanfeng, had no choice but to order the retreat of the division to the vicinity of Beishangen to reorganize. Due to the ferocity of the Japanese attack, an artillery company stationed near the divisional headquarters of the New 31st Division was wiped out when Liu Zhenheng, the deputy commander of the siege, failed to notify them in time, and the company's four mountain artillery guns were all captured by the Japanese Army.

After capturing Huangcaowa, the Japanese Army turned their attention to the Northwest Pass. The 2nd Company of the 2nd Battalion of the 91st Regiment defending the Northwest Pass and the regiment's machine gun company under the command of Captain Sun Yingnian, the commander of the 2nd Company, concentrated their light and heavy machine guns to successfully block the Japanese Army. At this time, the 95th and 96th Regiments of the New 32nd Division rushes towards Baotou City. Under the command of divisional commander Major General Yuan Qingrong, the two regiments immediately engaged in battle and fought fiercely with the Japanese Army attacking Northwest Pass. At the time, the follow-up troops of the Japanese 26th Division also arrived one after another and joined the battle, resulting in the New 32nd Division to be attacked from both sides and suffered heavy losses. divisional staff officer Captain Wang Xiaopeng and the two company commander of the 96th Regiment were killed in action one after another. Just when the New 32nd Division was in danger, the 101st Division, after getting rid of the Puppet Mongolian troops along the way, also rushed to join the battle at Northwest Pass. The Chinese and Japanese sides fought around the Northwest Pass until after nightfall.

On the morning of December 22, the Japanese Army, which had taken a short rest in the city, ordered Major General Katagiri Shigeru, commander of the 1st Cavalry Brigade, as the commander-in-chief of the counterattack, commanding 6 infantry companies, 3 cavalry companies, 1 tank team, and part of the artillery to launch a general counterattack against the various units of the 35th Army inside and outside the city. The 101st, New 31st, and New 32nd Divisions and the 1st Regiment of the 5th Provisional Police Brigade simultaneously launched fierce attacks against the Japanese Army. The battle lasted until noon and ended when the Japanese Army stopped their attack.

=== Active retreat ===
As Japanese and Puppet reinforcements continued to rush towards Baotou, the Chinese Army was already extremely fatigued after two days and two nights of bitter fighting. If they continued to fight with the Japanese Army, they will inevitably suffer greater losses. For this reason, General Fu Zuoyi, Deputy Commander-in-Chief of the 8th War Area, believed that a large number of Japanese and Puppet troops had been killed or wounded in the three-day fierce fighting, and it was impossible to recapture Baotou at this time, so General Fu decided to withdraw his troops. The summary of the order was as follows: "Our troops have already entered Baotou after a long-distance attack, annihilated a large number of enemies, and attracted the main force of the Japanese army. The mission of cooperating with the Xiangbei Campaign has been completed. In order to avoid disadvantages and seek victory, it has been decided to make a strategic shift. All units should cover each other and disengage from the battle according to the order of first the units inside the city and then the units outside; first the units attacking the city, then those intercepting reinforcements. The withdrawal will proceed on the night of the 21st toward the Zhongtan area."

At noon on the 22nd, the 35th Army began to retreat. After discovering that the main force of the 35th Army showed signs of retreat, the Japanese Army sent a large number of tanks and automobiles in hot pursuit, but they were immediately entangled by the 101st Division in the rear and forced to withdraw to Baotou. Although the main force of the 35th Army escaped from the Japanese pursuit, it was attacked by the Puppet Mongolian Army in the Kundoulun River area. In this battle, more than a hundred troops below Captain Zhang Luchen, the commander of the 3rd Company of the 1st Battalion of the 94th Regiment of the New 32nd Division, who were covering the main force of the 35th Army in their retreat, were killed in action.

At this time, on the front line in Baotou, when General Fu's order was issued, Major General Wang Leizhen, deputy commander of the New 31st Division, urgently sent men into the city to convey the order to Colonel An Chunshan of the 93rd Regiment. However, the officers and soldiers who entered the city to fight expressed their determination to recapture Baotou and refused to retreat. The troops outside the city had begun to retreat one after another, and the deputy commander Wang of the New 31st Division, sent men repeatedly to urge An Chunshan to withdraw his troops. At this time, An Chunshan could only falsely claim that "the retreat was fake, and the real plan is a decisive battle outside the city" to trick his troops to retreat from Baotou. When the troops led by Colonel An Chunshan withdrew to the Kundoulun River, they found that the main force of the 35th Army was entangled with the Puppet Mongolian Army, so they immediately joined the battle and attacked the Puppet Mongolian Army from the side. The Puppet Mongolian Army was attacked from both sides and retreated to the northwest foothills of the Kundoulun River. Although the Japanese and puppet troops in Baotou had assembled nearly 10,000 troops, they did not take further action because they were blocked during the previous pursuit.

On the early morning of the 24th, the divisions of the 35th Army withdrew to the Zhongtan area and returned to West Suiyuan. The attack on Baotou was over. While the 35th Army withdrew from Baotou, seven soldiers from the 1st Battalion of the 93rd Regiment were still holding on to the Niangniang Temple in Baotou city. They had not received the order to retreat, and after discovering that the main force had retreated, they chose to continue fighting. After running out of food and ammunition on the nightfall of the 22nd, they committed suicide. After the battle, the Japanese Army, moved by their loyalty and bravery, erected a monument for these seven heroic Chinese soldiers.

== Aftermath ==
The 35th Army killed and wounded more than 3,000 Japanese and puppet troops, destroyed more than 60 Japanese vehicles, 4 tanks, destroyed an arsenal, captured a large number of weapons and munitions, killed a Japanese regimental commander (the commander of the 13th Cavalry Regiment, Kazuaki Ohara, died of his injuries after returning to Guyang), and captured a Puppet Army commander. According to the statistics of the Japanese Army's internal confidential documents, in the winter counterattack launched by the Japanese army outside Baotou in late December, a total of 11 officers and 196 troops below NCOs were killed in action. In addition, 30 officers and 464 troops below NCOs were wounded in action, for a total of 701 troops killed or wounded. If the casualties of the Japanese Army in mid-December and the casualties of the Japanese Army caused by the Chinese Army in Baotou were added, the Japanese Army should have suffered nearly 1,000 casualties in the Battle of Baotou. The 35th Army suffered more than 2,000 casualties in this battle. Although the 35th Army failed to recapture Baotou in this battle, this attack was beneficial to the consolidation of the anti-Japanese base in North China, attracted the attention of Japanese troops in northern Shanxi, southern Chahar and most of North China, and prevented the Japanese Army's plan to withdraw troops from North China to the south from being implemented. It has played a huge role strategically.

This action by the Chinese Army gave the Japanese Army a great shock. They had never expected that Fu Zuoyi's Group would have the strength to launch an offensive against the Japanese Army. In order to prevent Fu Zuoyi's Group from harassing Baotou again, the Japanese troops stationed in Mongolia formulated "Operation No. 8" on January 15, 1940, aimed at annihilating Fu Zuoyi's Group. Considering that Wuyuan is more than 200 kilometers west of Baotou, beyond the combat control line of the Japanese military headquarters, the Japanese Army in Mongolia submitted the combat plan to the headquarters. The Japanese military headquarters had not considered occupying West Suiyuan at the time, so although it approved the plan on January 24, it ordered the attacking troops to withdraw immediately to their original defense areas after achieving their objectives. This decision eventually led to Fu Zuoyi taking advantage of the opportunity when the main forces of the Japanese army withdrew one after another after completing their mission, launching a counterattack and ultimately winning the battle at West Suiyuan.
