= 26th Division (Imperial Japanese Army) =

- Active: 1937–1945
- Country: Empire of Japan
- Branch: Imperial Japanese Army
- Type: Infantry
- Garrison/HQ: Manchukuo
- Nickname: "Spring Division"
- Engagements: 1939–40 Winter Offensive; Battle of Leyte

Commanders
- Notable commanders: Jun Ushiroku; Shigenori Kuroda

The 26th Division (第26師団, Dai-nijūroku Shidan) was an infantry division in the Imperial Japanese Army. Its call sign was the Spring Division (泉兵団, Izumi Heidan). The 26th Division was raised 30 September 1937 out of the three independent infantry regiments from the original 11th Independent Mixed Brigade and reserve components from various divisions based in Manchukuo. It has the distinction of being the first Japanese triangular division.

== Action ==
Intended initially as a garrison force to provide security for central Manchukuo, on July 4, 1938, it was attached to the forming Mongolia Garrison Army in Inner Mongolia. The 26th Division have participated in 1939–40 Winter Offensive. Stationed initially in Datong, first it was used to parry a Chinese attack on Xinyang 22 December 1939. Later the 26th Division was used to relieve a besieged Baotou 28 January 1940. By 4 February 1940, the 26th Division broke the Chinese opposing forces near Baotou, overrun Wuyuan and advanced to Linhe District. The Chinese counter-attack resulted in the Battle of Wuyuan from 16 March 1940 and the 26th Division retreated to Baotou 30–31 March 1940.

18 March 1943, the 26th infantry brigade was abolished and infantry regiments were subordinated directly to the divisional command.

With the situation in the Pacific War against the United States becoming critical, 1 July 1944, the 26th Division was transferred to the Japanese 14th Area Army based in Manila, Philippines. The reconnaissance regiment was disbanded as unnecessary. The division had suffered heavy (about 7,000 men killed) losses en route to Manila as the Convoy Hi-71 was ambushed by the US submarines. Also, landing at Ormoc 9 November 1944 occurred amidst the Battle of Ormoc Bay, therefore transport ships were forced to leave early, before unloading all of the equipment and supplies - only to be sunk while on return route. Many of later supply and reinforcement vessels were also sunk. The 26th Division attacked US positions in the Battle of Shoestring Ridge 28 November 1944, resulting in tactical stalemate until 5 December 1944, when Japanese forces were withdrawn to between Palanas river and Tabgas River in Albuera, where the Japanese defences held for few more days. On 6 December 1944, one battalion of the 26th Division participated in the Battle of the Airfields together with the remnants of the 16th Division but after some initial successes was defeated 9 December 1944. The 26th Division was largely annihilated during the Battle of Leyte by 23 December 1944 and all contact with the central command was lost until early March, 1945. Few soldiers survived until the surrender of Japan 15 August 1945 in the mountains of Merida and Isabel.

== See also ==
- List of Japanese Infantry Divisions

== Reference and further reading ==
- Madej, W. Victor. Japanese Armed Forces Order of Battle, 1937–1945 [2 vols] Allentown, PA: 1981
- This article incorporates material from the Japanese Wikipedia page 第26師団 (日本軍), accessed 8 March 2016.
