= Ma Dunjing =

Ma Dunjing may refer to:

- Ma Dunjing (1906-1972), Chinese Muslim Lieutenant-General
- Ma Dunjing (1910-2003), Chinese Muslim Major-General
