= Ningxia Campaign (1949) =

1949 military campaign

- Part of the Chinese Civil War
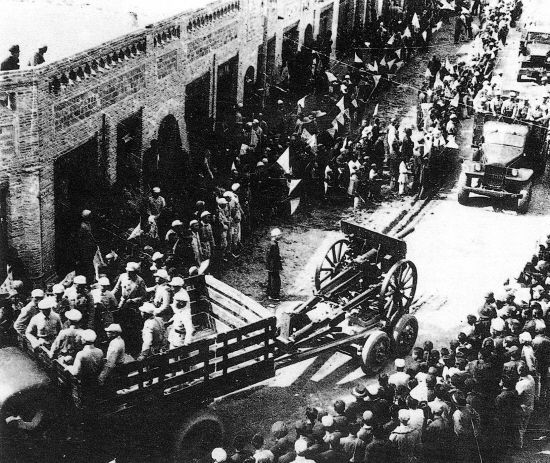
- The People's Liberation Army enters Yinchuan
Date	September 5, 1949 – September 24, 1949
Location	Ningxia, China
Result	Communist victory

Belligerents
National Revolutionary Army	People's Liberation Army

Commanders and leaders
Ma Dunjing 马敦静	Yang Dezhi; Li Zhimin 李志民

Strength
75,000	75,000

Casualties and losses
40,000+	Low

The Ningxia Campaign was a series of battles fought between the Nationalists and the Communists during the final months of the Chinese Civil War. It resulted in a Communist victory.

== Order of battle ==
Nationalist order of battle:

- Ningxia Corps was commanded personally by Ma Dunjing (马敦静)
  - 11th Army was commanded by Ma Guangzong (马光宗)
  - 128th Army was commanded by Lu Zhongliang (卢忠良)
  - Helan Army was commanded by Ma Quanliang (马全良)
- 81st Army was commanded by Ma Dunjing (马惇靖)

The following units were deployed in the beginning, but later on, did not participate in the fighting:

- 10th Cavalry Army was commanded by Ma Dunhou (马敦厚)
- 5th Cavalry Army was commanded by Ma Chengxiang (马呈祥)
- 100th Division was commanded by Tan Chenxiang (谭成祥)
- 190th Division was commanded by Ma Zhenwu (马振武)
- 248th Division was commanded by Han Youlu (韩有禄)
- 129th Army was commanded by Ma Buluan (马步銮)
  - 287th Division was commanded by Ma Zhang (马漳)
  - 357th Division was commanded by Yang Xiurong (杨修戎)
- 82nd Army was commanded by Ma Jiyuan (马继援)
  - 14th Cavalry Brigade was commanded by Ma Chenxian (马成贤)

Communist order of battle:

- XIX Corps was commanded by Yang Dezhi and the political commissar Li Zhimin (李志民)
  - 63rd Army was commanded by Zheng Weishan (郑维山) and the political commissar Wang Zonghuai (王宗槐)
  - 64th Army was commanded by Zen Siyu (曾思玉) and the political commissar Wang Zhao (王昭)
  - 65th Army was commanded by the political commissar (王道帮) and the deputy commander Xiao Yingtang (肖应棠). The commander Qiu Wei (邱蔚) was ill and did not participate in the campaign.
- Independent 1st Division of the Northwestern Military Region
- Independent 2nd Division of the Northwestern Military Region

== Prelude ==
After the defeat in the Lanzhou Campaign, Ningxia was no longer the concern of the Nationalist commander-in-chief of northwest China Ma Bufang, who was busy protecting his home base Qinghai. The nationalist deputy commander-in-chief of northwest China Ma Hongkui fled to Hong Kong via air, and left his son, Ma Dunjing (马敦静) in charge to make a last stand against the Communists. The Nationalists organized three lines of defense in the region and deployed over 160,000 troops for the campaign, but the Nationalist strategy was severely hampered by internal disagreements. Five out of the eight armies deployed were Ma Bufang's force, who were much more concerned about maintaining their own strength to retreat to and block the inevitable Communist advance on their home base in Qinghai. Consequently, Ma Bufang's force refused to take any orders from Ma Dunjing (马敦静) and never participated in the fighting, despite being deployed initially by Ma Dunjing (马敦静) under previous agreements between Ma Bufang and Ma Hongkui. As a result, only 75,000 Nationalist troops participated in the campaign, rendering the Nationalists unable to achieve numerical or technical superiority.

== Campaign ==
The Communists launched their offensive on three fronts. By 14 September 1949, towns including Jingyuan (靖远), Tongxin (同心) and Zhongning (中宁) had fallen into communist hands. On 15 September 1949, the Nationalist 15th Cavalry Brigade guarding Jingtai (景泰) surrendered to the Communists. The main force of the Communist 63rd Army took Changle Bunker (Chang Le Bao, 常乐堡) to the south of Zhongwei (中卫) County on 16 September 1949, after completely destroying two regiments of the nationalist 81st Army. Meanwhile, the 188th Division of the communist 63rd Army approached Zhongwei (中卫) County from the west from Jingtai (景泰) on 17 September 1949, after passing through the Tengger Desert. The nationalist 81st Army was hard pressed from both south and west. Under heavy military and political pressure, Ma Hongbin, the nationalist deputy commander of Northwestern China, and his son Ma Dunjing (马惇靖, not the same person as Ma Hongkui’s son, Ma Dunjing, 马敦静, the nationalist commander-in-chief of the Ningxia Corps), the commander of the Nationalist 81st Army defected to the Communist side on 19 September 1949. The 81st was subsequently reorganised by the Communists into the 2nd Northwestern Independent Army on 19 December 1949.

On 19 September 1949, the Communist 64th Army launched its offensive against Jingji (金积) and Lingwu, badly mauling the Nationalist 128th Army in the Jinji-Lingwu Campaign. By 21 September 1949, all three defensive lines organized by the Nationalists were completely destroyed. Ma Dunjing (马敦静) fled to Chongqing by air and the Ningxia Corps lost its commander. As a result, the nationalist 11th Army, the remnant of the 128th Army and the Helan (贺兰) Army disintegrated as the surviving Nationalist troops deserted en masse. On 24 September 1949, the communist XIX Corps entered Yinchuan without resistance and the campaign concluded with a Communist victory. The Nationalists lost over 40,000 of the original 75,000 troops, while the remaining deserted, and the Communist victory ended the 36-year rule of Ma clique in Ningxia, as well as overall Nationalist rule over the region.

== See also ==
- Outline of the Chinese Civil War
- National Revolutionary Army
- History of the People's Liberation Army
