= Battle of Wuyuan =

1940 battle of the Second Sino-Japanese War

Coordinates: 31°05′24″N 108°15′58″E

- Part of the 1939–1940 Winter Offensive in the Second Sino-Japanese War
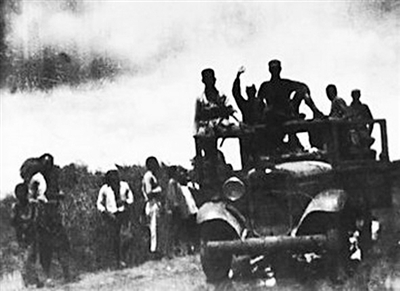
- Chinese 35th Army
Date	March 16 – April 3, 1940 (2 weeks and 4 days)
Location	Vicinity of Wuyuan County in the western part of Suiyuan, Republic of China
Result	Chinese victory

Belligerents
(Republic of China (1912–1949)) Republic of China	Empire of Japan

Commanders and leaders
(Republic of China (1912–1949)) Fu Zuoyi (Republic of China (1912–1949)) Ma Hongbin (Republic of China (1912–1949)) Ma Hongkui (Republic of China (1912–1949)) Ma Buqing	(Empire of Japan) Naozaburo Okabe (Empire of Japan) Shigenori Kuroda

Strength
16,587 including Chinese Muslim Cavalry	5,000 – 10,000: Puppet Mongolian Army : approximately 3,000; Puppet West Suiyuan Army : approximately 1,000; West Suiyuan Garrison : more than 1,500 (including approximately 310 Japanese police officers)

Casualties and losses
Contemporary report: 1,211 killed 1,288 wounded 233 missing 1962 book: 1,943 killed or wounded 278 missing	Heavy: More than 100 of the 300 Japanese police officers killed or missing

The Battle of Wuyuan (March 16 – April 3, 1940; Chinese: 五原戰役) was a Chinese counterattack defeating a Japanese offensive in the Wuyuan area as part of the 1939-40 Winter Offensive in Suiyuan during the Second Sino-Japanese War. The Japanese call it the "Second Battle of the Back Loop" (第2次後套作戦).

== Background ==
By 28 January 1940 the Japanese had built up sufficient forces from the 26th Division at Baotou to launch the "First Battle of the Back Loop" (第1次後套作戦), recovering previously lost territory and moving west to take Wuyuan. It fell on 3 February, Linhe further west followed on 4 February.

== Involved units ==
Japanese Forces:

- Mongolia Garrison Army (駐蒙軍) under Naosaburo Okabe
  - 26th Division under Lt. Gen. Shigenori Kuroda
  - IJA Cavalry Group

Chinese Forces:

- 8th War Area under Deputy Commander Fu Zuoyi
  - 35th Corps under Fu Zuoyi
    - New 4th Division
    - New 31st Division
    - 11th Provisional Division
    - Garrison Brigade
  - 81st Corps under Ma Hongbin
    - 101st Division
  - 6th Cavalry Corps under Ma Buqing
    - 3rd Cavalry Division
  - Guerrilla Force

== Course of the battle ==
On March 16, 1940, as the Japanese were attacking the New 4th Division west of Linhe, the rest of the Chinese 35th Corps with the New 31st Division and a regiment of the Garrison Brigade, secretly moved east along the Wu-chia River. On the night of the 20th they entered Wuyuan by surprise and after a seesaw fight over the strongpoint captured the city at 1600 hours on the 21st. The Japanese garrison retreated northward. Chinese forces then moved on to capture a strongpoint around Hsin-an-chen on the 22nd. This cut the road along the Yellow River to Wuyuan.

In an attempt to recover the situation the Japanese sent 600 troops from Dashetai via Siyitang in 80 trucks to make a forced crossing of the Wu-chia River at Ta-tsai-chu 10 km (6.2 mi) north of Wuyuan. For three days they fought the 101st Division without success. By the 25th they had been reinforced to 3,000 men and made the crossing with artillery and air support. Wuyuan again fell to the Japanese on the 26th and the Chinese fell back to the banks of Fang-chi-chu and continued their attacks at Xin'an, Xishanzui, Xixiaozhao, and Man-ko-su.

The Middlesboro Daily News, reporting on Japan's planned offensive into the Muslim region, predicted that the Japanese would suffer a crushing defeat.

Muslim Generals Ma Hongkui and Ma Hongbin defended west Suiyuan, especially Wuyuan in 1940 against the Japanese. Ma Hongbin commanded the Muslim 81st corps and incurred heavy casualties, but after fierce fighting eventually repulsed the Japanese and defeated them.

Unable to withstand the pressure of Chinese attacks, the Japanese at Wuyuan retreated on March 30 and 31. On April 1 a guerrilla force and cavalry column recaptured Wuyuan, and the 11th Provisional Division recaptured Wu-pu-lang-kou. On April 3, cavalry recovered Xishanzui as the Japanese retreated to the east.

Japan used poison gas against the Chinese armies at the Battle of Wuyuan and Battle of West Suiyuan.

== Casualties ==
Chinese casualties were reported by commander Fu Zuoyi on 24 April 1940, they were also compiled in a 1962 book by the Defense Ministry of Taiwan.

Chinese casualties	KIA	WIA	MIA
Contemporary report	1,211	1,288	233
1962 book	1,943		278

== Aftermath ==
After the battle, Fu Zuoyi, deputy commander of the Eighth Military Front, requested that the 1st battalion of the 95th regiment of the new 32nd division be awarded the honorary flag, citing their bravery in attacking Wuyuan, fighting until battalion commander Zhao Shoujiang (趙壽江) was killed and the whole battalion had only 11 soldiers left. On May 16, the Nationalist Government awarded the battalion the Flying Tiger Flag.

Japan's goal in the battle was to enter Ningxia in 1940 and sever China's Northwest Highway in Gansu (Hexi corridor), from which supplies from the Soviet Union were purchased and Japan failed to achieve this. It was China's only other link to the outside world besides the Burma road which Britain shut down in 1940.

Before the battle of Wuyuan, the Japanese Army had a low opinion of the Eighth War Zone's combat effectiveness. In late March 1940 after the battles of Baotou and West Suiyuan, the Japanese Army assessed the combat strength of frontline units of the various Chinese War Zones. For the Eighth War Zone which according to the Japanese Army were mostly made up of miscellaneous units from Shanxi, the Northeast, Gansu, Qinghai, and Ningxia with only a few Central Army and newly-formed units, a large portion of the units were not given ratings. Most of the units of the war zone which were assessed received 'C' to 'E' ratings in terms of combat effectiveness. The Eighth War Zone was the only Chinese War Zone which had units that were rated by the Japanese Army with 'E' for combat effectiveness, which constituted the majority of those assessed. The only unit to receive a 'B' rating from the war zone was the 86th Division of the 22nd Army, which the Japanese Army claimed to be a branch of the Chiang Kai-shek’s Central Army. In early May 1940 after the Chinese victory at Wuyuan, the Japanese Army made another assessment for their opponent, with noticeable changes for the Eighth War Zone. Among the Chinese units which participated in the battle of Wuyuan, the New 4th Cavalry Division received a bump on its rating of combat effectiveness from 'E' to 'D' and the 101st Division and New 31st Division of Fu Zuoyi’s direct unit of the 35th Army were boosted from a 'E' rating to a 'B', the highest bump from all Chinese units in the Japanese Army’s assessment. Of the units that did not take part in the battle, the Japanese Army also increased the rating of the New 3rd Cavalry Division of the Northeastern Army from 'E' to 'B'. All units of the 81st Army of the Ningxia Army, which were not given a rating in the previous March assessment, received 'C' ratings. All units of Chiang Kai-shek's Central Army stationed in the Eighth War Zone which had not received ratings were given 'B' ratings in terms of combat effectiveness.

== Sources ==
- Hsu Long-hsuen and Chang Ming-kai, History of The Sino-Japanese War (1937–1945) 2nd ed., 1971. Translated by Wen Ha-hsiung, Chung Wu Publishing; 33, 140th Lane, Tung-hwa Street, Taipei, Taiwan Republic of China. p. 319-334, "Chinese Winter Offensive" (Late Nov 1939 - Late March 1940) Map 19.
