= Shigenori Kuroda =

Japanese officer, war criminal (1887-1952)

- 黒田 重徳

Japanese Military Governor of the Philippines
- In office May 28, 1943 – September 26, 1944
- Monarch: Emperor Hirohito
- Preceded by: Shizuichi Tanaka
- Succeeded by: Tomoyuki Yamashita

Personal details
- Born: October 25, 1887 Yanagawa, Fukuoka, Japan
- Died: April 30, 1952 (aged 64) Tokyo, Japan

Military service
- Allegiance: Empire of Japan
- Branch/service: Imperial Japanese Army
- Years of service: 1909–1945
- Rank: Lieutenant General
- Battles/wars: World War I; Russian Civil War; Siberian intervention; World War II; Second Sino-Japanese War; Battle of Wuyuan; Pacific War

Shigenori Kuroda (黒田 重徳, Kuroda Shigenori; October 25, 1887 – April 30, 1952) was a Japanese lieutenant general of the Imperial Japanese Army and the Japanese Governor-General of the Philippines during World War II.

== Biography ==
Kuroda was born in Yanagawa, Fukuoka and graduated from the 21st class of the Imperial Japanese Army Academy in 1909 and the 29th class of the Army Staff College in 1916. His classmates included Tomoyuki Yamashita and Shizuichi Tanaka. From 1917 to 1918, he was with Japanese forces assigned to the Siberian intervention, during which time he was promoted to captain. In 1922, Kuroda served as military attaché in England and was promoted to major. From 1935-1937, he served as military attaché in British India. In 1937, he was promoted to major general and given command of the IJA 26th Division.

=== Battle of Wuyuan ===
Kuroda commanded the IJA 26th Division in the Battle of Wuyuan in the Second Sino-Japanese War. The battle, which was part of the Japanese counterattack in response to the Chinese 1939–1940 Winter Offensive, resulted to a Chinese victory and Japanese retreat. The Japanese call it 第2次後套作戦 (English:The second battle of Wuyuan). Despite the loss in the battle, the Japanese had a strategic victory for making the Chinese fail their primary objectives.

=== Pacific War ===
In 1941, with the start of the Pacific War, Kuroda was appointed Deputy Inspector General for Military Training, which was then under General Otozō Yamada. From July 1, 1942 to May 19, 1943, he was Chief of Staff of the Japanese Southern Expeditionary Army Group.

=== Philippines ===
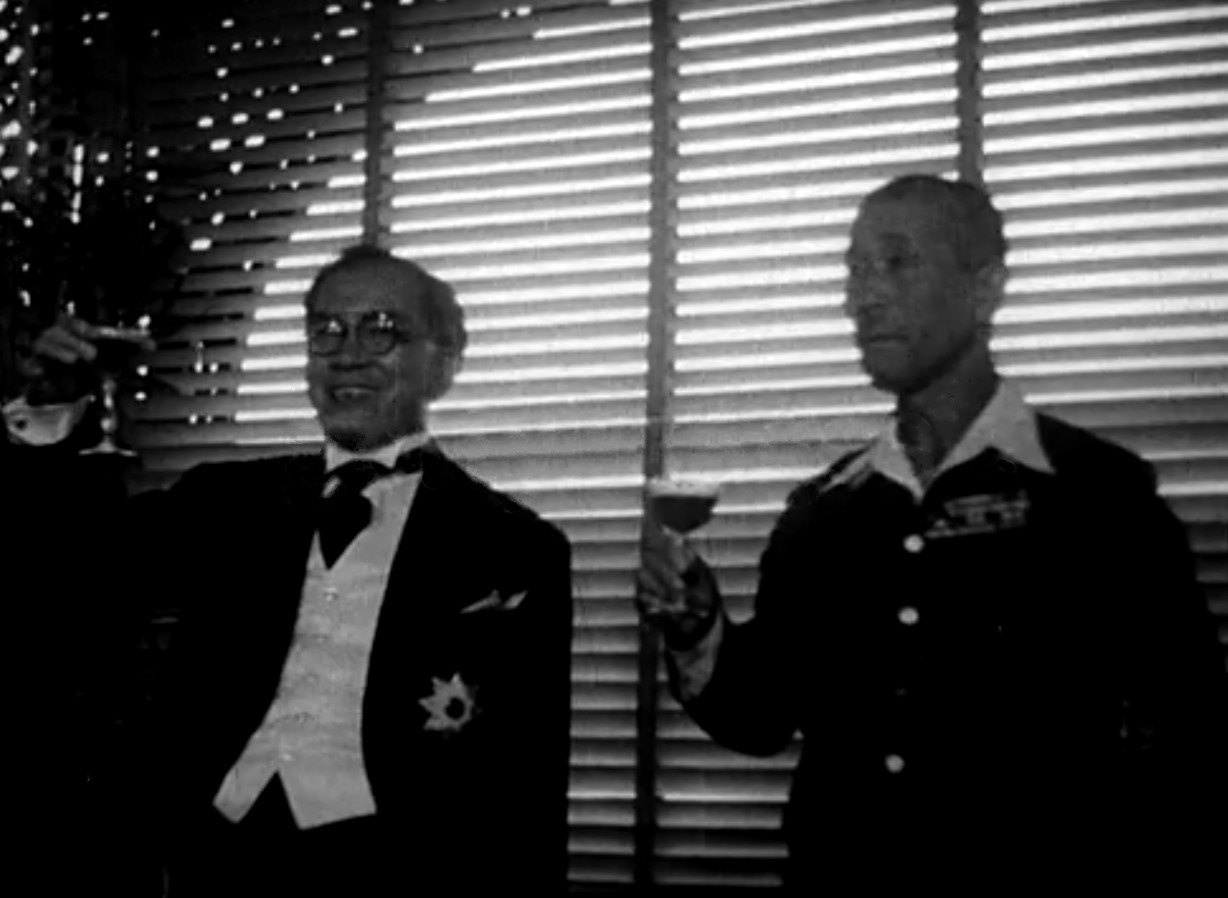
Jose P. Laurel with Kuroda during the inaugural session of the Second Philippine Republic's National Assembly, October 14, 1943

From May 28, 1943 to September 26, 1944, Kuroda was made military governor of the Philippines, succeeding Shizuichi Tanaka. He later became the first Commander in Chief of the Japanese Fourteenth Area Army, which were the merged elements of the Japanese 14th Army, 35th Army, and 41st Army, in the Philippines from July 28 to September 26, 1944.

During his rule in the Philippines, a constitution was formed by the Preparatory Commission for Independence, consisting of 20 members from the KALIBAPI. The Preparatory Commission, led by José P. Laurel, presented its draft Constitution on September 4, 1943 and three days later, the KALIBAPI general assembly ratified the draft Constitution.

By September 20, 1943, the KALIBAPI's representative groups in the country's provinces and cities elected from among themselves fifty-four members of the Philippine National Assembly, the legislature of the country, with fifty-four governors and city mayors as ex officio members.

Three days after establishing the National Assembly, the Second Philippine Republic's inaugural session was held at the pre-war Legislative Building and it elected by majority Benigno S. Aquino as its first Speaker and José P. Laurel as President of the Republic of the Philippines, who was inaugurated on October 14, 1943 at the foundation of the Republic.

=== American return and postwar life ===
By early 1944, the Imperial Japanese Army General Staff anticipated the return of American forces to the Philippines. The weight for preparing against an American landing fell to Kuroda. Kuroda planned to concentrate the bulk of the Japanese forces in Luzon, but his plan was never considered by the Imperial Army General Staff. The staff instead devoted only five of his ten divisions in Luzon, which was said to have no experience in any of the past Japanese campaigns. After being denied of his ideas for the defense of the Philippines, he was accused to have been lax in his duties and was replaced by Tomoyuki Yamashita, his former schoolmate in the Army War College, who was touted as a "superb and excellent tactician", after the fall of his patron Hideki Tojo from power. Kuroda returned to Japan in disgrace in October 1944 and entered the reserves in December of the same year.

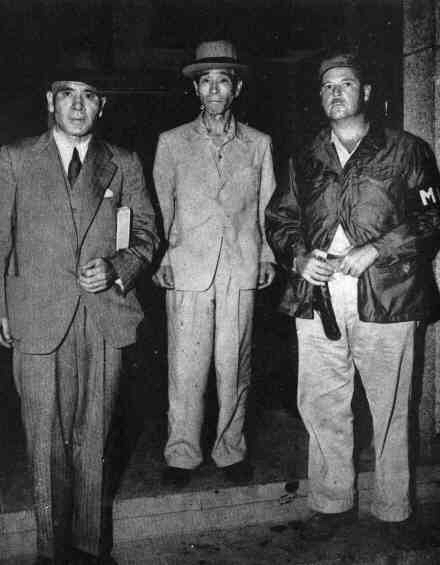
Masaharu Homma (left) and Shigenori Kuroda (center) in U.S custody

After the surrender of Japan, Kuroda was arrested by American occupation authorities in 1946 and held in Yokohama Prison. In October 1947, he was extradited to the Republic of the Philippines during the Manila Trials was and condemned to life imprisonment as a Class B war criminal due to command responsibility for the actions of his troops in the Philippines, for the deaths of nearly 3,000 American and Filipino civilians. His lawyer at the time was Lieutenant Colonel Jose Lukban. He disguised Kuroda by putting a mole on his face, and removing that at the end of the trial to discredit the witnesses thrown at the Japanese general. He was pardoned in 1952 by Philippine president Elpidio Quirino and repatriated to Japan, where he died the same year.

Kuroda's chief defense counsel was Pedro A. Serran, Col. USAFFE who was named the "Liberator of Zarraga, Iloilo in Panay Island". Ironically Col. Serran, as a commissioned officer and practicing lawyer, fought the Japanese in combat as a captain. Leading attacks against the Japanese garrisons and collecting intelligence for the US military's return. A professional lawyer believing in democracy and due process, he became the chief attorney who represented Kuroda in his defense. Col. Serran was anti-corruption and became a US citizen after the war, he died at age 86 in the San Francisco Bay Area.

== See also ==
- 26th Division (Imperial Japanese Army)
- Japanese Fourteenth Area Army
