= 1939–1940 Winter Offensive =

Military offensive of the Second Sino-Japanese War

- Part of Second Sino-Japanese War
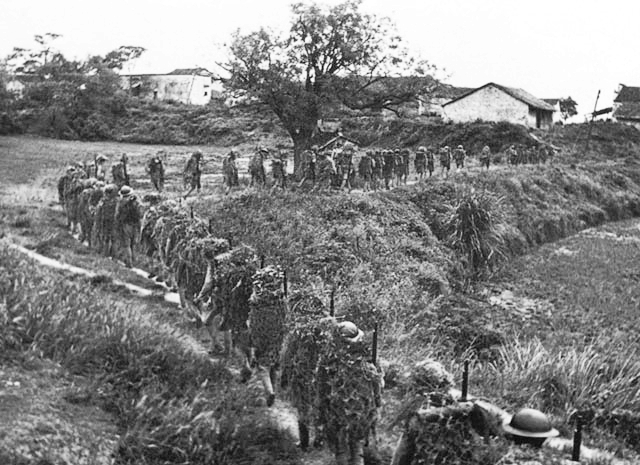
- Chinese soldiers 1939
Date	26 November 1939 – 3 April 1940 (4 months, 1 week and 1 day)
Location	Vicinities of Anhui, Guangdong, Hubei, Henan, Hunan, Jiangxi, Shanxi, Shandong and Suiyuan in the Republic of China
Result	Japanese victory

Belligerents
Republic of China	Empire of Japan: Mengjiang

Commanders and leaders
(Republic of China (1912–1949)) Wei Lihuang (Republic of China (1912–1949)) Gu Zhutong (Taiwan) Li Zongren (Taiwan) Xue Yue (Taiwan) Bai Chongxi (Republic of China (1912–1949)) Zhang Fakui (Republic of China (1912–1949)) Fu Zuoyi (Republic of China (1912–1949)) Ma Hongkui	(Empire of Japan) Toshizō Nishio (Empire of Japan) Hayao Tada (Empire of Japan) Yasuji Okamura (Empire of Japan) Rikichi Andō (Empire of Japan) Naozaburo Okabe

Strength
1,480,353 including Chinese Muslim Cavalry in 122 divisions	850,000 including Mengjiang Cavalry

Casualties and losses
Chinese claims Main Operations: (Note: Includes losses of the: Second, Third, Fifth, and Ninth (including the Sixth) Military Fronts from December 1939 until January 1940; Fourth Military Front in the first battle of Northern Guangdong from 17 December 1939 until 10 January 1940): 40,274 killed; 48,748 wounded; 8,243 missing; 12,013 unspecified casualties; Supporting Operations: Late November 1939 to the end of January 1940 (Note: Losses of the First, Eighth, Shandong-Jiangsu, and Hebei-Chahar Military Fronts in guerilla operations (including 1,591 casualties from the Eighth Route Army)): 866 killed; 1,281 wounded; 554 missing; 5,998 unspecified casualties; February and March 1940 (Note: Eighth Military Front in the battle of West Suiyuan and battle of Wuyuan): 4,815 killed or wounded; 2,404 missing; Japanese claims December 1939 and January 1940: ~111,374 killed; 7,128 captured	Chinese claims: More than 20,000 killed; 9 transport ships damaged or sunk; 11 pieces of assorted artillery captured; ~400 captured; Japanese claims December 1939: North China Area Army : 766 killed, 1,662 wounded; Central China Area Army : 11th Army : 1,404 killed, 3,847 wounded; 13th Army : 531 killed, 1,404 wounded; South China Area Army : 21st Army : 293 killed, 1,281 wounded; January 1940: North China Area Army : 429 killed, 980 wounded; Central China Area Army : 11th Army : 741 killed, 2,369 wounded; 13th Army : 244 killed, 433 wounded

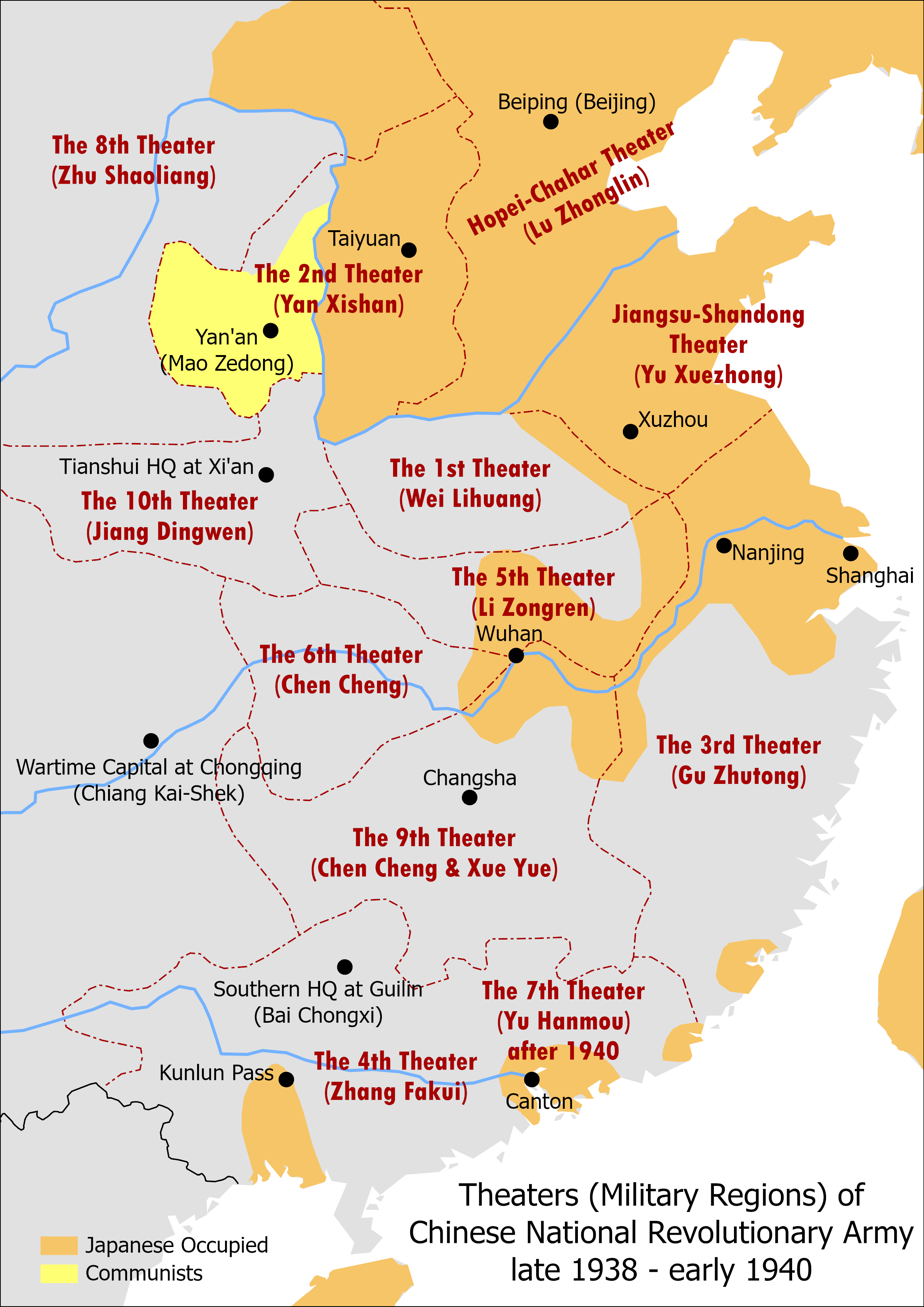
Chinese War Areas during Sino-Japanese War

The 1939–1940 Winter Offensive (Chinese: 冬季攻勢) was a major engagement between the National Revolutionary Army and Imperial Japanese Army during the Second Sino-Japanese War. It constitutes the first major counter-offensive on multiple fronts of Chinese forces in the war. Although it failed to achieve its original objectives, later studies have shown that it came as a blow to the Japanese forces. The Japanese military command had not expected the Chinese to be able to launch an offensive operation at such a large scale.

By April 1940, the Japanese army had successfully fought the operation to a halt. However, a Japanese counter-offensive to seize Ningxia failed and was defeated in Suiyuan by Chinese Muslim forces.

== Background and strategic situation ==
The Chinese had repulsed two Japanese offensives in the summer at the Battle of Suixian-Zaoyang and in fall at the 1st Battle of Changsha. They believed that the Japanese forces were now too dissipated to take and hold new territory and would not be able to launch large offensives unless they received more reinforcements. However, by defending interior lines and with control of the lines of communication, they could still shift forces and launch local offensives to damage Chinese forces or mop up guerrillas in the rear areas. Additionally, during 1939, the Japanese were replacing many of their large four-regiment square Divisions with the smaller three regiment triangular Divisions and weak Independent Mixed Brigades. This weakening of forces encouraged the Chinese to plan a large offensive to exploit that fact.

== Chinese plan ==
The Chinese objective in the offensive was to take the initiative by conducting multiple-front attacks to tie down Japanese forces. They intended to use their position of exterior lines to advantage to prevent the Japanese from launching new local offensives or shifting their forces to concentrate for a large offensive. The main effort was to be by the 2nd, 3rd, 5th and 9th War Areas, located on the more northeastern side of China, closest to Japan, which received all newly trained and reorganized units. Secondary efforts in support of the main efforts or as diversions were to be conducted by 1st, 4th, 8th, Shandong-Jiangsu and Hebei-Chahar War Areas, further south or west from Japan, with their existing units.

== Northern China ==
Long-hsuen's "History of The Sino-Japanese War" then ends the narrative of the operation with the mention that supply difficulties greatly affected operations because of Communist raids in their rear area and instigation of revolts, which seized food and forbade it to be sold to the government forces. Despite this, the 40th Corps and 27th Corps accomplished their aim of pinning down the Japanese in the Zhangzi and Changzhi area. However, in southwestern Shanxi, the main effort of 2nd War Area and of the whole North China offensive failed to seize the major towns on the railroad or Japanese strongpoints that were their objectives or to cut the Tongpu railway, except for the area between Wenxi and Anyi. At the end of the campaign, the 2nd War Area claimed that 13,770 Japanese killed or wounded. The 1st War Area reported that 5,130 Japanese killed, and seems to have accomplished its mission of tying down Japanese troops in its area of operations. The 8th War Area, after a see-saw campaign, had succeeded in rolling the Japanese back to Baotou in the Battle of Wuyuan. Guerrilla forces in the Hebei-Chahar and Shandong-Jiangsu War Area carried out attacks but apparently without decisive results, and in the Shandong peninsula they received a serious counterattack.

From December 19, 1939, to January 24, 1940, the Japanese 36th Division launched multiple operations against the 40th Army and 27th Army in the Gaoping area, each with three to four infantry battalions and two to three artillery battalions alongside other units. During these mopping-up campaign, the division claimed to have engaged with more than 10,000 enemy troops and claimed 2,977 abandoned enemy corpses, 53 POWs, and 235 captured rifles while suffering 167 killed and 313 wounded. The 40th Army and 27th Army recorded a total of 835 killed, 1,419 wounded, and 109 missing during the Winter Offensive from December 1939 to January 1940. The Japanese 37th Division launched an operation at the Zhongtiao Mountains from December 3 to December 17, 1939, with its main force and conducted a mopping-up operation from December 31, 1939, to January 7, 1940, claimed 3,124 abandoned enemy corpses and 18 POWs in these two operations while suffering 171 killed and 560 wounded. The 12th Division from Yunnan was the main unit responsible for the defense of the Zhongtiao Mountains at the time, and suffered 680 killed, 822 wounded, and 91 missing in the battle from December 3 to December 11, 1939. The 7th, 84th, 42nd, and 169th Divisions engaging in guerilla actions in the area suffered a total of 481 killed, 566 wounded, and 17 missing in the whole Winter Offensive.

In total, the Japanese Army in North China claimed 37,204 abandoned enemy corpses and 4,237 POWs while suffering 1,195 killed and 2,642 wounded in December 1939 and January 1940. The First, Second, Eighth, Hebei-Chahar, and Shandong-Jiangsu War Zones suffered a total of 15,987 casualties (Note: Including 1,591 casualties from the Eighth Route Army in the Hebei-Chahar and Shandong-Jiangsu War Zones but excluding its losses in the First, Second, and Eighth War Zones)in the Winter Offensive including 3,620 killed, 5,456 wounded, and 913 missing from the Second and Eighth War Zones.

In 1937, the Chinese government picked up intelligence that the Japanese planned to install a puppet Hui Muslim regime around Suiyuan and Ningxia, and had sent agents to the region. The Middlesboro Daily News ran an article by Owen Lattimore which reported on Japan's planned offensive into the Muslim region in 1938, which predicted that the Japanese would suffer a crushing defeat at the hands of the Muslims.

The Japanese planned to invade Ningxia from Suiyuan in 1939 and create a Hui Muslim puppet state. The next year, however, the Japanese were defeated by the Kuomintang Muslim Gen. Ma Hongbin, causing the plan to collapse. His Hui Muslim troops launched further attacks against Japan in the Battle of West Suiyuan.

In Suiyuan, 300 Mongol collaborators serving the Japanese were fought off by a single Muslim who held the rank of major at the Battle of Wulan Obo in April.

Muslim Generals Ma Hongkui and Ma Hongbin defended west Suiyuan, especially in Wuyuan, in 1940. Ma Hongbin commanded the 81st Corps, which suffered heavy casualties, but they eventually repulsed the Japanese and defeated them.

Japan made heavy use of chemical weapons against China to make up for lack of numbers in combat and because China did not have any poison gas stockpiles of its own to retaliate. Japan also used poison gas against Chinese Muslim armies at the Battle of Wuyuan and the Battle of West Suiyuan.

== Central China ==
River North Army accomplished little and was driven back behind the river by December 23, freeing up units of the Japanese 13th Division for use elsewhere. The Japanese held Right Flank Army in the Zhongxiang area far from the planned stop line from Xinshi to Songhe and Pingba. The Japanese contained Left Flank Army or (River East Army) far from its final objectives. Southern Honan Army did attack the enemy 3rd Division in the area north of Yingshan and Xishuanghe and send a strong force to cut enemy lines of communications in the area of Guangshui and Xinyang. Its main force was to attack in the area of Xinyang and occupy it. Neither of these objectives was achieved despite the commitment of the 31st Army Group. Eastern Hupei Guerrilla force did not advance to the enemy rear areas at Guangshui, Huayuan and Hankow to check enemy movement along the railroad. They never got near those objectives, leaving the Japanese free to move troops along the rails to meet other attacks.

In the morning of January 4, 1940, a Japanese force set out from Hefei to attack the 138th Division of the Guangxi Army at the Dashu Mountain. Brigade commander Long Yanwu led the 823rd Regiment under his command along with the 8th Guerilla Column and the 6th Peace Preservation Regiment of Anhui Province to set up an ambush, claiming to have annihilated the over 400-strong Japanese unit and killing over three hundred by the afternoon including one colonel and three commanding officers and capturing two mountain artillery pieces, three infantry support guns, four heavy machine guns, over ten light machine guns, over ten grenade launchers, and over two hundred rifles while the 138th Division suffered over a hundred casualties. According to a veteran of the 58th Independent Infantry Battalion who survived the battle, battalion commander Miura led a portion of his troops in Hefei to launch an attack at the Dashu Mountain in the morning of January 4 but ended up being surrounded. During the battle, the collaborationist Chinese troops accompanying the Japanese detachment took the opportunity to flee. By the afternoon, most of the troops under Miura had been annihilated with over a hundred including the lieutenant colonel killed in action. The mountain artillery commander committed seppuku and the few remaining troops were forced to abandon all of their heavy weapons to escape and link up with reinforcements (Note: From the 60th Infantry Regiment of the 15th Division.) who went to collect the bodies before returning.

One of the main objectives that the Chinese managed to retake was the city of Kaifeng. After two weeks of fighting, they managed to liberate the city on December 16th, capturing a good amount of Japanese equipment. Soon after, however, they were pushed out of the city again.

According to the history of the 65th Infantry Regiment of the Japanese 13th Division, the number of combat deaths for the regiment in the Winter Offensive was as high as 303.

The Japanese Eleventh Army claimed approximately 51,000 abandoned enemy corpses and 987 POWs while suffering 2,141 killed and 6,216 wounded in the Chinese Winter Offensive against units of the Fifth, Sixth, and Ninth War Zones from December 1939 to January 1940. Among all of its units, the 13th Division fighting against the Fifth War Zone suffered the heaviest losses with 925 troops killed and 2,565 troops wounded. The Fifth, Sixth, and Ninth War Zones reported suffering 26,902 killed, 36,432 wounded, and 5,023 missing in the offensive from early December 1939 to late January 1940.

== Guangdong ==
After routing the Japanese force coming from Longxian on January 1, the 54th Corps recaptured that town on the 2nd. Guandu fell on the 4th and Qingtang on January 5. The Japanese retreated to Shatian while 54th Corps advanced southwest to Shijiao. On January 3 the 2nd Provisional Corps laid siege to Yingde and took it on the 5th. It then continued to advance to Lianjiangkou while Japanese remnants fled southwest and took Qingcheng on the north bank of the Lian River, linking up with Japanese forces across the river to the south. Subsequently, portions of 64th Corps and 2nd Provisional Corps recovered Qingcheng on January 10. Across the river the next day 14th Division of 54th Corps recovered Pajiangkou and to the east Conghua fell to the detachment of 35th Army Group. Yuantan along the Guangzhou–Hankou railway fell the following day. Yinzhan'ao fell on January 16.

The main force of 35th Army Group moved along the west bank of the Bei River near Zhaoqing, and 54th Corps and a portion of 12th Army Group moved to take up positions at Hengshi, Liangkou, Lutian and Meikang. The 4th War Area reported more than 10,300 enemy killed, 100 rifles and large amount of supplies captured. The Chinese Army suffered 6,564 killed, 4,595 wounded, and 2,828 missing in the First Battle of Northern Guangdong from December 17, 1939, to January 10, 1940, and claimed to have captured 1 Japanese officer and 1 Japanese soldier. The Japanese 21st Army suffered 293 killed and 1,281 wounded in the Wengyuan-Yingde operation from the middle to the end of December 1939 and claimed to have killed 16,312 and captured 1,196 Chinese troops. According to each participating Japanese units' battle report, the 18th Division (excluding the 56th Infantry Regiment) suffered 62 killed, 162 wounded, and 1 missing in the Wengyuan-Yingde operation from December 14, 1939, to January 10, 1940. The 56th Infantry Regiment of the 18th Division suffered 3 killed and 1 wounded in the operation from December 23 to December 31, 1939. The 104th Division suffered 302 killed and 735 wounded in the operation from November 20, 1939, to January 13, 1940. The Guards Mixed Brigade suffered 106 killed, 221 wounded, and 20 missing in the operation from December 16, 1939, to January 4, 1940.

During the operation, the Gotō Task Force of the 104th Division invested five infantry battalions, one field artillery battalion, and one mountain artillery battalion to attack 3,600 Chinese troops at the west side of Chaozhou and Anbu from December 31, 1939 to January 6, 1940 and suffered 54 killed and 158 wounded in the battle. The Chinese 9th Independent Brigade reported suffering 91 killed and 148 wounded in the battles of Xitang, Fengxi, and Dahuang in early January 1940.

However, with the restricted frontage, and reinforcements sent from Central China the Japanese were able to shift forces to relieve their forces in South Guangxi.
