= Battle of West Suiyuan =

1940 battle of the Second Sino-Japanese War

Coordinates: 40.8106°N 111.652°E

- Part of the 1939–1940 Winter Offensive in the Second Sino-Japanese War
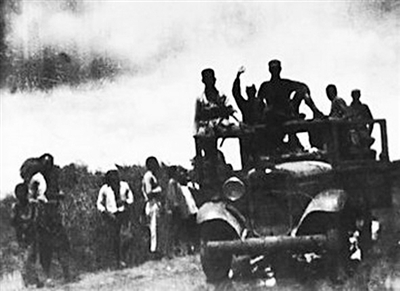
- Chinese 35th Army
Date	January 1940 – February 1940
Location	Suiyuan, Republic of China
Result	Chinese victory

Belligerents
(Republic of China (1912–1949)) Republic of China	Empire of Japan: Mengjiang

Commanders and leaders
(Republic of China (1912–1949)) Ma Hongkui (Republic of China (1912–1949)) Ma Hongbin	(Empire of Japan) Shigenori Kuroda

Strength
28,763 Chinese Muslim and Han Chinese troops (Note: All of them infantry and horse cavalry.)	In the thousands; Armoured cars; Tanks; Air support by fighter bombers

Casualties and losses
Contemporary report: 2,129 killed 1,767 wounded 1,895 missing 1962 history: 2,872 killed or wounded 2,126 missing	Japanese Army claim: 160 killed 461 wounded 534 afflicted with frostbite (Japanese Army only) (Note: Mengjiang Army unknown)

The Battle of West Suiyuan (simplified Chinese: 绥西战役; traditional Chinese: 綏西戰役; pinyin: Suíxī zhànyì) was part of the Second Sino-Japanese War. It was fought from January – February 1940 during the Chinese 1939 Winter Offensive.

The Japanese fielded tanks, armoured cars, tear gas and fighter bombers while the Chinese warlord armies involved had no airforce or even equivalent armour.

== Battle ==
In 1937, the Chinese government picked up intelligence that the Japanese planned a puppet Hui Muslim regime around Suiyuan and Ningxia, and had sent agents to the region.

The Middlesboro Daily News ran an article by Owen Lattimore which reported on Japan's planned offensive in 1938, predicting that the Japanese would suffer a massive defeat at the hands of the Muslims.

The Japanese planned to invade Ningxia from Suiyuan in 1939 and create a Hui Muslim puppet state. The following year in 1940, the Japanese were defeated militarily by the Kuomintang Muslim General Ma Hongbin. Ma Hongbin's Hui Muslim troops launched further attacks against Japan in the Battle of West Suiyuan. Japanese plans to invade Ningxia and Gansu collapsed, and with it a capture of China's only operational oil field in Yumen. Perhaps more importantly, the Chinese remained in control of the vital Hexi Corridor through which war material supplies entered from Soviet-occupied Xinjiang and Soviet Central Asia.

It was reported at the time that a single heroic Muslim who held the rank of Major fought off 300 Mongol collaborators serving the Japanese at the Battle of Wulan Obo in April 1939 .

Muslim Generals Ma Hongkui and Ma Hongbin defended west Suiyuan, particularly Wuyuan in 1940 against the Japanese. Ma Hongbin commanded the 81st corps and sustained heavy casualties, but eventually repulsed the Japanese and defeated them. However, the Chinese had to withdraw from many cities in western Suiyuan due to heavy casualties.

Japan used poison gas against Chinese Muslim armies at the Battle of Wuyuan and Battle of West Suiyuan.

== Casualties ==
Chinese casualties were compiled in a report by commander Fu Zuoyi from 24 April 1940 as well as in a 1962 history of the ROC Ministry of National Defense.

Chinese casualties	KIA	WIA	MIA
Contemporary	2,129	1,767	1,895
1962	2,872		2,126
