= Ma Dunjing (1906–1972) =

Chinese general

- 馬惇靖
- Born: 1906; Linxia County, Gansu, Qing China
- Died: 1972 (aged 65–66); Lanzhou, People's Republic of China
- Military career
- Allegiance: Republic of China; China
- Branch: National Revolutionary Army; People's Liberation Army
- Service years: 1920–1972
- Rank: General
- Unit: Ma clique
- Conflicts: Second Sino-Japanese War; Chinese Civil War; Ningxia Campaign

Ma Dunjing (simplified Chinese: 马惇靖; traditional Chinese: 馬惇靖; pinyin: Mǎ Dūnjìng; Wade–Giles: Ma Tun-ching, Xiao'erjing: مَا دٌڭِئٍ; 1906–1972) was a prominent Muslim Ma Clique General in China during the Republic of China era, and was the son of General Ma Hongbin. Some sources give his birth date as 1901 rather than 1906. He fought against and defeated the Japanese in May 1938 in Suiyuan province during World War II, and he fought against the Communists in the Ningxia Campaign, but he defected to the Communists with his father, and led his 81st Corps to cross over to the communists. He died in Lanzhou in 1972.

Ma Dunjing's grandfather was General Ma Fulu who died fighting the foreigners in the Boxer Rebellion in Beijing in 1900. His family moved Ma Fulu's remains in 1995 from Beijing to Linxia County.

== Service ==
- 1934 Commanding Officer 205th Regiment, 103rd Brigade, 35th Division
- Commanding Officer 103rd Brigade, 35th Division
- 1937–1943 Chief of Staff 81st Army
- 1943–1946 General Officer Commanding 35th Division, 81st Army
- 1946–1947 General Officer Commanding 81st Division
- 1947–1948 Commander in Chief Haigu Army Group
- 1948–1949 General Officer Commanding 81st Army
- 1949 Revolts against the Nationalist Government
- 1949 Joins the People's Liberation Army

== See also ==
- Ma clique
