= Ma Dunjing (1910–2003) =

Republic of China general (1910–2003)

Ma Dunjing 馬敦靜
- Born: 2 January 1910; Linxia County, Gansu, China
- Died: 3 September 2003 (aged 93); Los Angeles, California, United States
- Military career
- Allegiance: Republic of China
- Branch: (Republic of China (1912–1949)) National Revolutionary Army
- Service years: 1926–1949
- Rank: Major General
- Unit: Ma clique
- Conflicts: Second Sino-Japanese War; Chinese Civil War; Ningxia Campaign

Ma Dunjing (Xiao'erjing: مَا دٌڭِئٍ, traditional Chinese: 馬敦靜; simplified Chinese: 马敦静; pinyin: Mǎ Dūnjìng; Wade–Giles: Ma Tun-ching; 2 January 1910 – 3 September 2003) was a prominent Chinese general of the Republic of China era and the son of General Ma Hongkui, who ruled the northwestern province of Ningxia. Born to a Hui family in 1910 in Gansu, he served as an official in his father's Ningxia government. During World War II, he was a General in the National Revolutionary Army. He was a member of the Kuomintang, and fought against the Chinese communist party during the Ningxia Campaign. He fled to Taiwan in 1949, then to Los Angeles in the U.S. with his father in 1950. He was appointed to the Recovery of the Mainland Research Commission in 1954 and he died in the U.S. in 2003. His older brother was Ma Dunhou (Ma Tun-hou, misspelled as Ma Tung-hou) 馬敦厚 and his younger brother was Ma Dunren (Ma Tun-jen) 馬敦仁.

== See also ==
- Ma clique
