= Ma Hongbin =

Chinese politician and warlord

- 马鸿宾
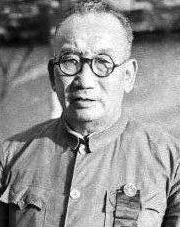
- General Ma Hongbin

Governor of Gansu
- In office November 1930 – December 1931
- Preceded by: Wang Zhen (Wang Chen)
- Succeeded by: Ma Wenche (Ma Wen-ch'e)

Governor of Ningxia (1st time)
- In office January 7, 1921 – December 1928
- Preceded by: Ma Fuxiang (Ma Fu-hsiang)
- Succeeded by: Men Zhizhong (Men Chih-chung)

Governor of Ningxia (2nd time)
- In office 1948–1949
- Preceded by: Ma Hongkui
- Succeeded by: Pan Zili (P'an Tzu-li)

Personal details
- Born: September 14, 1884 Linxia County, Gansu
- Died: October 21, 1960 (aged 76) Lanzhou
- Party: Kuomintang
- Children: Ma Dunjing (1906–1972)
- Awards: Order of Leopold (Belgium)
- Nickname: "Ma the Kind Man"

Military service
- Allegiance: Qing Dynasty; Republic of China; China
- Years of service: 1910–1960
- Rank: General
- Unit: Ma clique
- Battles/wars: Second Zhili–Fengtian War, Central Plains War, War in Ningxia (1934), Long March, Second Sino-Japanese War, Chinese Civil War

Ma Hongbin (Chinese: 马鸿宾, Xiao'erjing: مَا خٌ‌بٍ, September 14, 1884 – October 21, 1960) was a prominent Chinese Muslim warlord active mainly during the Republican era, and was part of the Ma clique. He was the acting Chairman of Gansu and Ningxia Provinces for a short period.

== Life ==
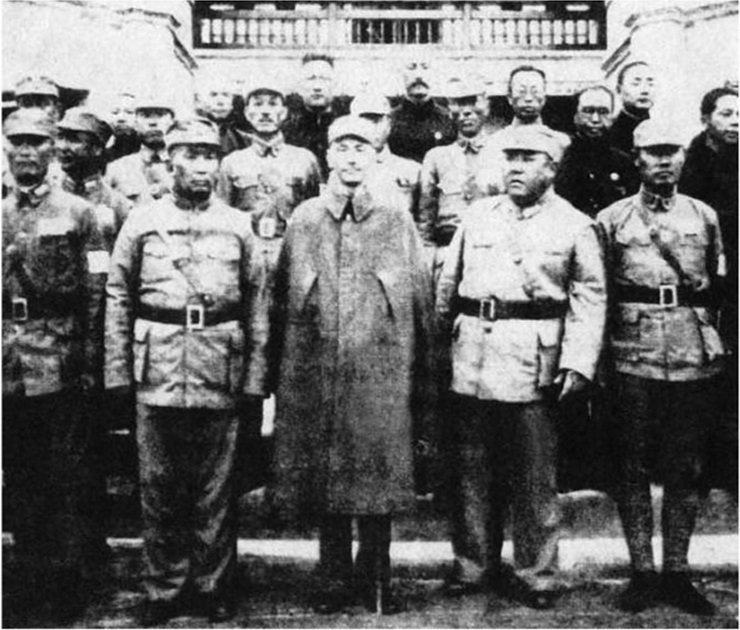
Chiang Kai-shek, leader of China, in the middle, meets with the Muslim Generals Ma Hongbin (second from left), and Ma Hongkui (second from right) at Ningxia, August 1942.

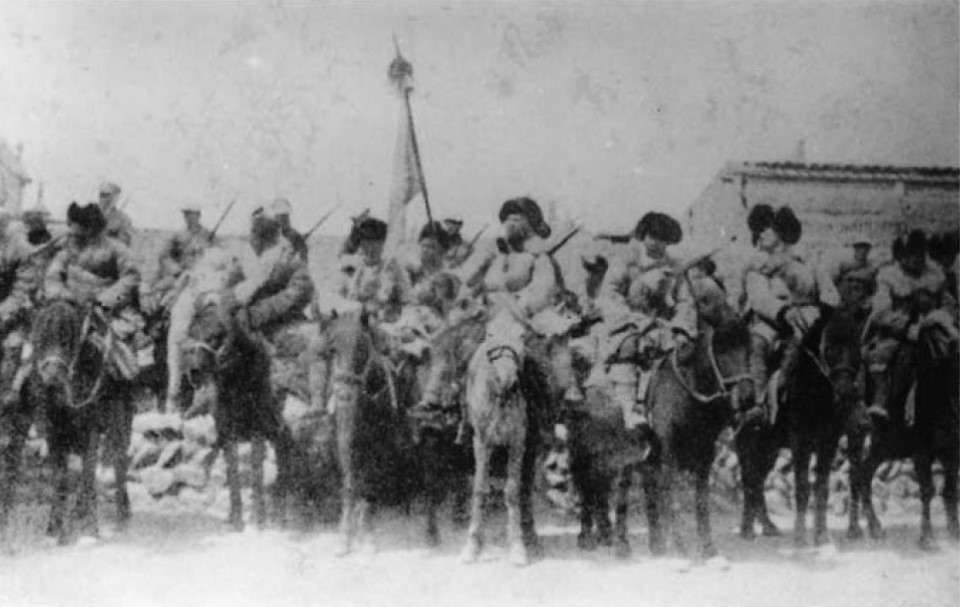
1939, Northwest China, Chinese Muslim fighters gather to fight against the Japanese

Ma was born in the village of Hanchiachi, in Linxia County, Gansu. He was the son of Ma Fulu who died in 1900 when fighting against the foreigners in the Battle of Peking (1900) in the Boxer Rebellion. As a nephew of Ma Fuxiang, he followed him and later Feng Yuxiang into the army. He and Ma Fuxiang protected a Catholic mission in Sandaohe from attacks by the Gelaohui, and he received the Order of Leopold (Belgium) ("King Leopold decoration") During an uprising in Gansu in the Central Plains War, the Muslim General Ma Tingxiang was attacked by Ma Hongbin who was serving in Feng's administration in Ningxia.

Upon his cooperation with Chiang Kai-shek, he was named commander of the 22nd Division, 24th Army, within the National Revolutionary Army. He was governor of Ningxia from 1921 to 1928 and chairman of the government of Ningxia in 1930. However, Ma Hongbin caused and consequently lost a power struggle with his cousin Ma Hongkui, a fact that was exploited by Chiang Kai-shek to his own advantage by preventing Hongbin's total defeat. In 1930, Chiang named Ma Hongbin as the Chairman of the Provincial Council of Gansu, a post he held until 1931; Hongbin's control over Gansu remained very limited, however, as the province was mostly ruled by his rival Ma Zhongying. Even after Zhongying's departure to the Soviet Union in July 1934, Gansu's armies and civilian population was still loyal to Zhongying. Hongbin helped Ma Hongkui to fight off an invasion of Ningxia by fellow warlord Sun Dianying in early 1934.

The Japanese planned to invade Ningxia from Suiyuan in 1939 and create a Hui Muslim puppet state. The next year in 1940, the Japanese were defeated militarily by Ma Hongbin, who caused the plan to collapse. Ma Hongbin's Hui Muslim troops launched further attacks against Japan in the Battle of West Suiyuan.

He became the commander of the 81st Corps during the Second Sino-Japanese War and World War II. In 1940 Ma Hongbin's Muslim troops took part in the Battle of West Suiyuan against Japan and their Mongol puppet state Mengjiang. In the same year at the Battle of Wuyuan, Ma Hongbin led the 81st Corps against the Japanese. The Japanese were defeated by the Chinese Muslim forces and Wuyuan was retaken. Japan used poison gas against the Chinese Muslim armies at the Battle of Wuyuan and Battle of West Suiyuan. Throughout the war, Ma Hongbin continued military operations against the Japanese and their Mongolian allies.

Ma Hongbin's army was clan centered and feudal. In his 81st corps, his chief of staff was his brother in law, Ma Chiang-liang.

The American Asiatic Association reported that he commanded the eighty fourth Army corps.

After the war, he became a senior adviser within the Northwestern Army Headquarters. When his cousin Ma Hongkui resigned from his positions and fled to Taiwan, those positions where transferred to Ma Hongbin. In 1949 during the Chinese Civil War, when the People's Liberation Army was approaching the northwest, Ma Hongbin and his son Ma Dunjing led his 81st Corps to cross over to the communist side. He was named vice-chairman (later restyled vice-governor) of Gansu province. He was also vice-director of the Commission of Ethnic Affairs as well as a member of the National Defense Commission of the People's Republic of China. He died in Lanzhou in 1960.

== Family ==
Ma Hongbin
- Traditional Chinese: 馬鴻賓
- Simplified Chinese: 马鸿宾
Transcriptions
Standard Mandarin
- Hanyu Pinyin: Mǎ Hóngbīn
- Wade–Giles: Ma Hung-pin
other Mandarin
- Xiao'erjing: ﻣَﺎ ﺡْﻮ بٍ

Ma Hongbin's father was Ma Fulu, and his cousin was Ma Hongkui. His uncles were Ma Fuxiang, Ma Fushou, and Ma Fucai. His grandfather was Ma Qianling.

Ma Hongbin's son was General Ma Dunjing (1906–1972), three of his nephews were Generals Ma Dunhou (Ma Tun-hou, misspelled as Ma Tung-hou) 馬敦厚, Ma Dunjing (1910–2003), and Ma Dunren (Ma Tun-jen) 馬敦仁.

== Career ==
- 1921 - 1928 Governor of Ningxia Province
- 1928 - ? Commander of the 22nd Division
- 1930 - Chairman of the Government of Ningxia Province
- 1930 - 1931 Chairman of the Provincial Council of Gansu
- 1938 - 1945 General Officer Commanding 81st Corps
- 1940 - 1941 Commander in Chief 17th Army Group
- Deputy Commander- in-chief of the XVnth Group Army

== See also ==
- Ma clique
