= Ma Hongkui =

Republic of China general (1892–1970)

- 馬鴻逵
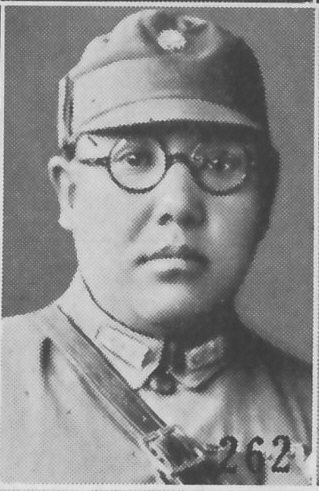
- Lt. Gen. Ma Hongkui as pictured in The Most Recent Biographies of Chinese Dignitaries

Governor of Ningxia
- In office 13 June 1931 – 23 September 1949
- Preceded by: Ji Hongchang
- Succeeded by: Position abolished

Governor of Gansu
- In office 3 August 1949 – 2 December 1949
- Preceded by: Kuo Chi-chiao
- Succeeded by: Wang Zhiqi

Personal details
- Born: March 14, 1892 Linxia County, Gansu, Qing Empire
- Died: January 14, 1970 (aged 77) Los Angeles, California, United States
- Party: Kuomintang
- Spouse: 5 wives
- Children: Ma Dunhou (Ma Tung-hou); Ma Dunjing (1910–2003); Ma Dunren
- Education: Lanzhou Military Academy
- Awards: Order of the Sacred Tripod
- Nickname: King of Ningxia

Military service
- Allegiance: Qing dynasty (Republic of China (1912–1949)) Republic of China
- Years of service: 1910–1949
- Rank: Lieutenant General
- Unit: Ma clique
- Commands: Chairman of Ningxia Province, Commander in Chief of the 17th Army Group
- Battles/wars: Second Zhili–Fengtian War, Central Plains War, War in Ningxia (1934), Long March, Second Sino-Japanese War, Chinese Civil War

Ma Hongkui
- Traditional Chinese: 馬鴻逵
- Simplified Chinese: 马鸿逵
Transcriptions
Standard Mandarin
- Hanyu Pinyin: Mǎ Hóngkuí
- Wade–Giles: Ma3 Hung2-k'uei2
other Mandarin
- Xiao'erjing: مَا خٌ‌کُوِ

Ma Hongkui (traditional Chinese: 馬鴻逵; simplified Chinese: 马鸿逵; pinyin: Mǎ Hóngkuí; Wade–Giles: Ma Hung-k'uei, Xiao'erjing: مَا خٌ‌کُوِ; March 14, 1892 – January 14, 1970) was a prominent Chinese Muslim warlord during the Republic of China era, ruling the province of Ningxia. His rank was lieutenant general. His courtesy name was Shao-yun (少雲). In 1950, Hongkui migrated to the United States, where he lived until he died in 1970.

He was considered by some sources to be among China's best generals.

== Life ==
Born March 14, 1892, in the village of Hanchiachi, in Linxia County (known as Hezhou), Gansu. The "Who's Who in China" series of books says "Taoho Hsien" (Daohe Xian) is where he was born. His father was Gen. Ma Fuxiang. A Hui, Ma Hongkui graduated from Lanzhou Military Academy (aka Gansu Military Academy) in 1909, and became commander of the Ningxia Modern Army and commander of the 7th Division after the founding of the republic. He was in Beijing until Cao Kun's presidency (1923–24), even though he was the commander of the Ningxia Army.

He was at one point the Ningxia, Shaanxi and Mongolia "Bandit Suppression Commander". Ma became commander of the Gansu "6th Mixed Brigade" in 1916.

During the Second Zhili–Fengtian War Ma Hongkui's army was reorganized into a branch of Feng Yuxiang's Guominjun forces; in 1926 Ma Hongkui was appointed as the commander of the Fourth Route Army of the Guominjun by Feng. He was also a member of the Mongolian and Tibetan Affairs Commission.

In 1927 he and Feng Yuxiang led their troops to Tongguan, Shaanxi, and fought the Northern Expedition. However, he betrayed Feng and allied with Chiang Kai-shek. During the Central Plains War of 1930, Ma fought for Chiang and was appointed commander of the 64th Division; upon capturing Tai'an, Shandong, he was promoted to commander of the 15th Army. In 1932 he was appointed Governor of Ningxia Province and fought Communist forces in the Shaanxi–Ningxia area for the next several years, up to the all-out Japanese invasion in 1937. During Ma Hongkui's rise to power, he with his cousin Ma Hongbin and warlords Ma Bufang and Ma Buqing were instrumental in helping another warlord, Ma Zhongying, prevail in Gansu because they did not want Ma Zhongying to compete with them in their own turf; they encouraged and supported Ma Zhongying to develop his own power base in other regions such as Gansu and Xinjiang.

In 1933, Chiang Kai-shek attempted to strengthen the Nationalist government and to weaken the Ma clique by ordering the unreliable National Revolutionary Army general Sun Dianying to move his private army to Qinghai's Qaidam Basin, ostensibly to colonize it. In reality, Chiang wanted to undermine the Ma family's rule by introducing another military and political faction into the region; the Ma warlords realized this and forced Chiang to revoke his order. From then on, however, the situation went out of control and Sun Dianying decided to conquer Ningxia on his own to prevent his troops from mutinying. A war for the province consequently broke out in early 1934. Despite initial setbacks Ma Hongkui managed to defeat Sun, also thanks to the support he received from other Ma warlords and the Nationalist government which was officially opposed to Sun by this point.

== Second Sino-Japanese War ==
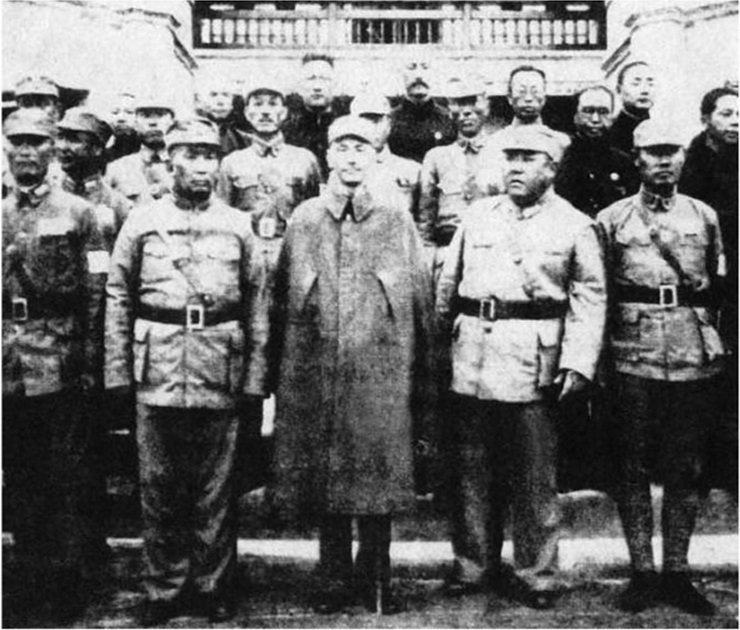
Chiang Kai-shek, leader of China, in the middle, meets with Muslim Generals Ma Hongbin (second from left) and Ma Hongkui (second from right) at Ningxia, August 1942.

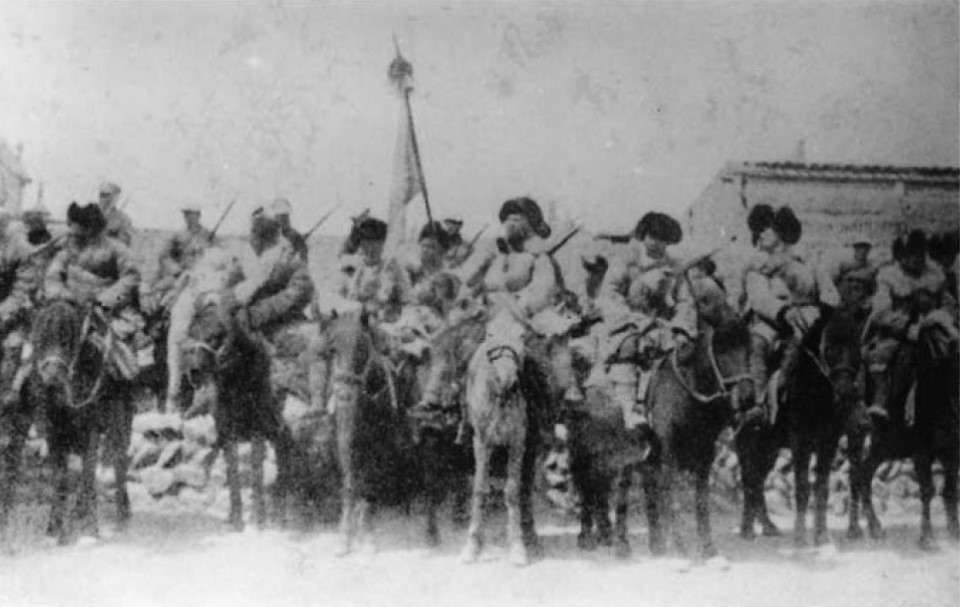
1939, Northwest China, Chinese Muslim fighters gather to fight against the Japanese

During World War II he took over the command of 17th Army Group. He was also the vice-commander of the 8th War Zone.

During the early 1930s Edgar Snow in his book Red Star Over China said that the Communist media (who were enemies of Ma Hongkui) claimed that Ma received some weapons from Japan when he was fighting the Communists, and met visiting delegations, but after Japan's invasion of China in 1937 he fought against Japan, supporting the imam Hu Songshan in spreading anti-Japanese propaganda, and sending limited numbers of troops to his cousin Ma Hongbin to fight the Japanese. According to Snow, the Communists claimed Ma had allowed a Japanese military airfield and some personnel in Ningxia, but the airfield was not there after the start of the Sino-Japanese War in 1937, reaffirming his allegiance to China.

When the Japanese asked Gen. Ma Hongkui to defect and become head of a Muslim puppet state under the Japanese, Ma responded through Zhou Baihuang, the Ningxia Secretary of the Nationalist Party, to remind Japanese military chief of staff Gen. Itagaki Seishiro that many of Ma's relatives fought and died in battle against Eight-Nation Alliance forces during the Battle of Peking (1900), including his uncle Ma Fulu, and that Japanese troops made up the majority of the Alliance forces, so there would be no cooperation with the Japanese. In response, Ningxia was bombarded by Japanese warplanes.

Ma Hongkui maintained a sharp watch against Japan during the war. He seized the city of Dingyuanying in Suiyuan and arrested Mongol prince Darijaya (Wade Giles : Ta Wang) in 1938 because a Japanese officer of the Kwantung Army, Doihara Kenji, visited the prince. Darijaya was exiled to Lanzhou until 1944.

In 1940 Ma Hongkui's Muslim troops took part in the Battle of West Suiyuan against Japan and their Mongol puppet state Mengjiang. Because of fierce resistance by Ma Hongkui and Ma Bufang's Muslim cavalry, the Japanese never reached Lanzhou during the war.

Ma Hongkui attacked the Inner Mongol Prince Darijaya and defeated the Mongol banner militia under his command in March 1938, accusing the Prince of collaborating with Japan, arresting him and saying he was "annihilating and extirpating pro-Japanese elements in Alashaa Banner." Ethnic Mongolian guerilla units were created by the Kuomintang Nationalists to fight against the Japanese during the war in the late 30s and early 40s. These Mongol militias were created by the Ejine and Alashaa based commissioner's offices created by the Kuomintang. Prince Demchugdongrob's Mongols were targeted by Kuomintang Mongols to defect to the Republic of China. The Nationalists recruited 1,700 ethnic minority fighters in Inner Mongolia and created war zones in the Tumet Banner, Ulanchab League, and Ordos Yekejuu League.

== Chinese Civil War ==
After the end of World War II, the Chinese Civil War broke out. Ma Hongkui fought for Chiang against the communists. He was in contact with Kazakh leader Ospan Batyr, who kept him informed of events. Ma and his Muslim army ruled over a non-Muslim majority of about 750,000 people in Ningxia, which did not have the natural defenses of Qinghai.

In March 1948, at Ichuan, Peng Dehuai led Communist forces in launching a surprise attack against Gen. Hu Zongnan's troops, inflicting 20,000 casualties upon them and driving all the way, with 60,000 soldiers, into southern Shanxi province to reach Sichuan. Hu requested immediate help from Ma Hongkui, who was the governor. Ma sent two Muslim cavalry divisions. They defeated the Communist forces at Pao-chi and killed 20,000 of them, expelling the survivors into Gansu.

In 1949, with Communist victory certain, Ma fled to Guangzhou (Canton) and then to Taiwan. The entire Kuomintang defenses were falling apart. Gen. Hu Zongnan ignored President Li Zongren's orders; Ma Hongkui was furious at this and sent a telegram to Li ordering him to submit his resignation from all positions he held. His cousin Ma Hongbin took charge of his positions. Ma Hongkui met with Chiang Kai-shek in Chongqing to plan an attack on the PLA. Ma Hongbin and his son Ma Dunjing (1906–72) were hoodwinked by Communist promises. Ma Dunjing signed a surrender agreement with the PLA, then defected to the Communists. This had a domino effect on other military men in the province, who in turn defected.

Ma fled to Taiwan. Accused of "frustrating the fulfilment of the military plan" by the Control Yuan, because he failed to defeat the Communist forces in his defense area, he moved to San Francisco with the help of Claire Chennault. In December 1950 Ma was in San Francisco. Ma moved to Los Angeles, where he died on January 14, 1970. At a 1951 press conference in the United States, Ma Hongkui urged the country to aid the KMT in Taiwan. Ma became a rancher in the United States and bred horses.

Ma Hongkui had a son, Ma Dunjing, who was also a general and official in his Ningxia government.

Chiang Kai-shek addressed Ma Hongkui as Shao Yun shixiong, which refers to the son of a friend. Chiang was a Sworn brother to Ma Hongkui's father Ma Fuxiang.

== Reign over Ningxia ==
Ma Hongkui was brutal in his reign, with executions averaging one a day; he started his reign as governor in 1932 by decapitating 300 bandits. The other Muslim governor, Ma Bufang, was reported to be good-humored and jovial in contrast to the brutal reign of Ma Hongkui. He was called a warlord by westerners. Ma Hongkui stood out from the other provincial governors with the degree of his strong rule over Ningxia.

Ma Hongkui, like the president of China, Chiang Kai-shek, was virulently anti-Communist. Whenever Communists turned up in his territory they invariably ended up dead. However, he was also credited with many achievements during his reign. His brutal method of governing managed to stamp out corruption among officials, and he was never pleased with results. He constantly drilled his peasant Muslim army in combat, who were armed mostly with swords, spears and rifles. His standing army consisted of 100,000 troops; counties provided reserves of 10,000 men each. He set the draft age range from 15–55, up from 18–25. The Tibetans and Ma were unfriendly to each other. When the Communists were closing in on him, he found himself at risk of being trapped between his Tibetan and Communist enemies.

Ma Hongkui's government had a company, Fu Ning Company, which had a monopoly over commerce and industry in Ningxia. His house in Yinchuan was a tourist attraction.

== Diabetes ==
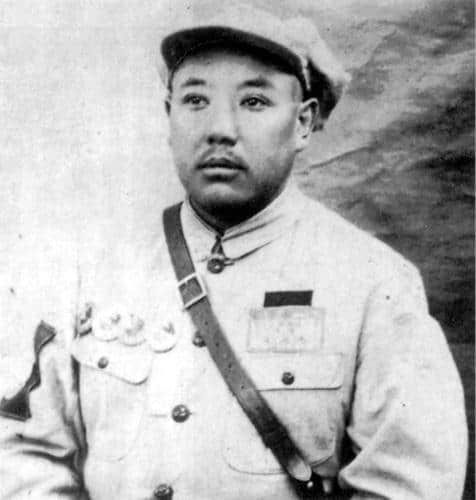
Gen. Ma Hongkui in uniform.

Gen. Ma Hongkui suffered from severe diabetes attacks, and in 1949 they became so bad that he was not expected to recover. Despite his diabetes he frequently ate ice cream.

== Martial arts ==
Ma personally wielded Dadao swords in combat and during training with his troops. His soldiers' battle cry was "Sha!", which means "kill!" in Chinese. Another one of his hobbies was Chinese calligraphy.

== Islamic education ==
Ma promoted Islamic education. The Yihewani Imam Hu Songshan and Ma cooperated in founding several Sino-Arabic schools in Ningxia to promote Chinese- and Arabic-language Islamic education for Chinese Muslims in the 1930s and 1940s. Hu Songshan became head of the Ningxia Private Sino-Arabic College at Dongdasi Mosque, which was founded by Ma in Yinchuan, the capital of Ningxia province, in 1932. Students flocked to it from provinces across China after it became a public institution in the following year. Ten days prior to the end of Ramadan in 1935, Ma arranged for Chinese New Year celebrations. Hu Songshan pronounced takfir upon Ma for this, while delivering an aggressive and fierce sermon in public. Ma then sacked Hu from his position and exiled him. Hu received clemency from Ma and was sent to head the Sino-Arabic Normal School in Wuzhong in 1938.

== Family ==
Ma Hongkui's grandfather was Ma Qianling, his father was Ma Fuxiang, his uncles were Ma Fushou, Ma Fulu and Ma Fucai, his cousin was Ma Hongbin, and he had six wives and several children. His sixth wife, with whom he was the closest, cared for him until his death. She arranged the building of the cemetery plot in Taipei where he is buried along with his eldest son and his fourth wife.

Ma Hongkui's mother was Ma Tsai (te). He married his first wife, Liu Chieh-cheng, in 1914. As of 1948 he had three children. His mother died in 1948.

Three of his sons were generals: Ma Dunhou (Ma Tung-hou 馬敦厚), Ma Dunjing (1910–2003) (馬敦靜) and Ma Dunren (馬敦仁) in order from eldest to youngest. He also had a nephew, Ma Dunjing (1906–1972) (馬敦靖). Ma and his grandson were involved in a custody dispute in 1962 over the grandson's daughter, who was Ma's great-granddaughter named Mi Mi Ma, who was 13 years old. He was 70 at the time and was hospitalized. The dispute was taken to court in San Bernardino, California.

== Artifacts possessed by Ma Hongkui ==
A number of Chinese artifacts dating from the Tang dynasty and Song dynasty, some of which had been owned by Emperor Zhenzong, were excavated and came into the hands of Ma Hongkui, who refused to publicize the findings. Among the artifacts were a white marble tablet from the Tang dynasty, gold nails and bands made out of metal. It was not until 1971, after Ma died, that his wife went to Taiwan to bring the artifacts to Chiang Kai-shek, who handed them to the Taipei National Palace Museum.

== Career ==
- 1923–1926 Commander of the Ningxia Army
- 1926–1930 Commander of the Fourth Route Army of the Guominjun
- 1930 Commander of the Nationalist 64th Division
- 1930–1931 Commander of the Nationalist 15th Army
- 1932–1949 Chairman of the Government of Ningxia Province
- 1938 Commander in Chief 17th Army Group
- 1938–1941 General Officer Commanding 168th Division
- 1944 Commander in Chief 17th Army Group

== See also ==
- Ma clique

== Sources ==
- Ma Hongkui
- Hutchings, Graham. Modern China. First. Cambridge, MA: Harvard University Press, 2001. ISBN 0-674-01240-2
