= Wuyuan County, Inner Mongolia =

Wuyuan County 五原县 · ᠦᠶᠤᠸᠠᠨ ᠰᠢᠶᠠᠨ
- County
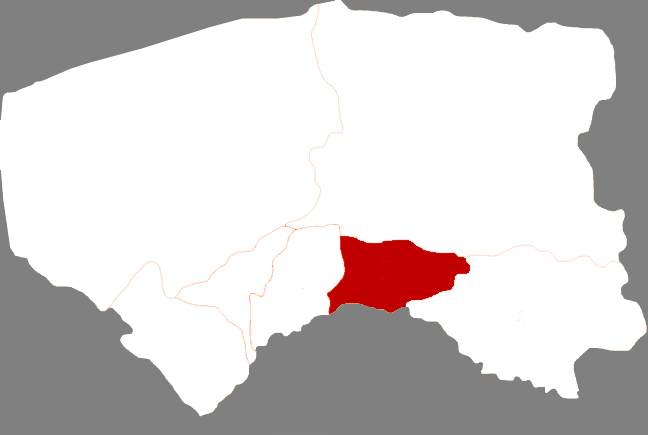
- Wuyuan in Bayannur

- Bayannur in Inner Mongolia

- Location in Inner Mongolia Wuyuan (China)
- Coordinates: 41°05′18″N 108°16′03″E
- Country: China
- Autonomous region: Inner Mongolia
- Prefecture-level city: Bayannur
- County seat: Longxingchang

Area
  - Total: 2,472 km^{2} (954 sq mi)

Population (2020)
  - Total: 224,809
  - Density: 90.94/km^{2} (235.5/sq mi)
- Time zone: UTC+8 (China Standard)
- Website: www.wuyuan.gov.cn

Wuyuan County, Inner Mongolia

Chinese name
- Simplified Chinese: 五原县
- Traditional Chinese: 五原縣
Transcriptions
Standard Mandarin
- Hanyu Pinyin: Wǔyuán Xiàn

Mongolian name
- Mongolian script: ᠦᠶᠤᠸᠠᠨ ᠰᠢᠶᠠᠨ
Transcriptions
- SASM/GNC: Üyuvan siyan

Wuyuan County (Mongolian: ᠦᠶᠤᠸᠠᠨ ᠰᠢᠶᠠᠨ; Chinese: 五原县), is a county with 224,809 inhabitants (2020) under the administration of Bayannur, Inner Mongolia. The total area of the county is 2,493 km^{2} (963 sq mi) with its administrative center at Longxingchang.

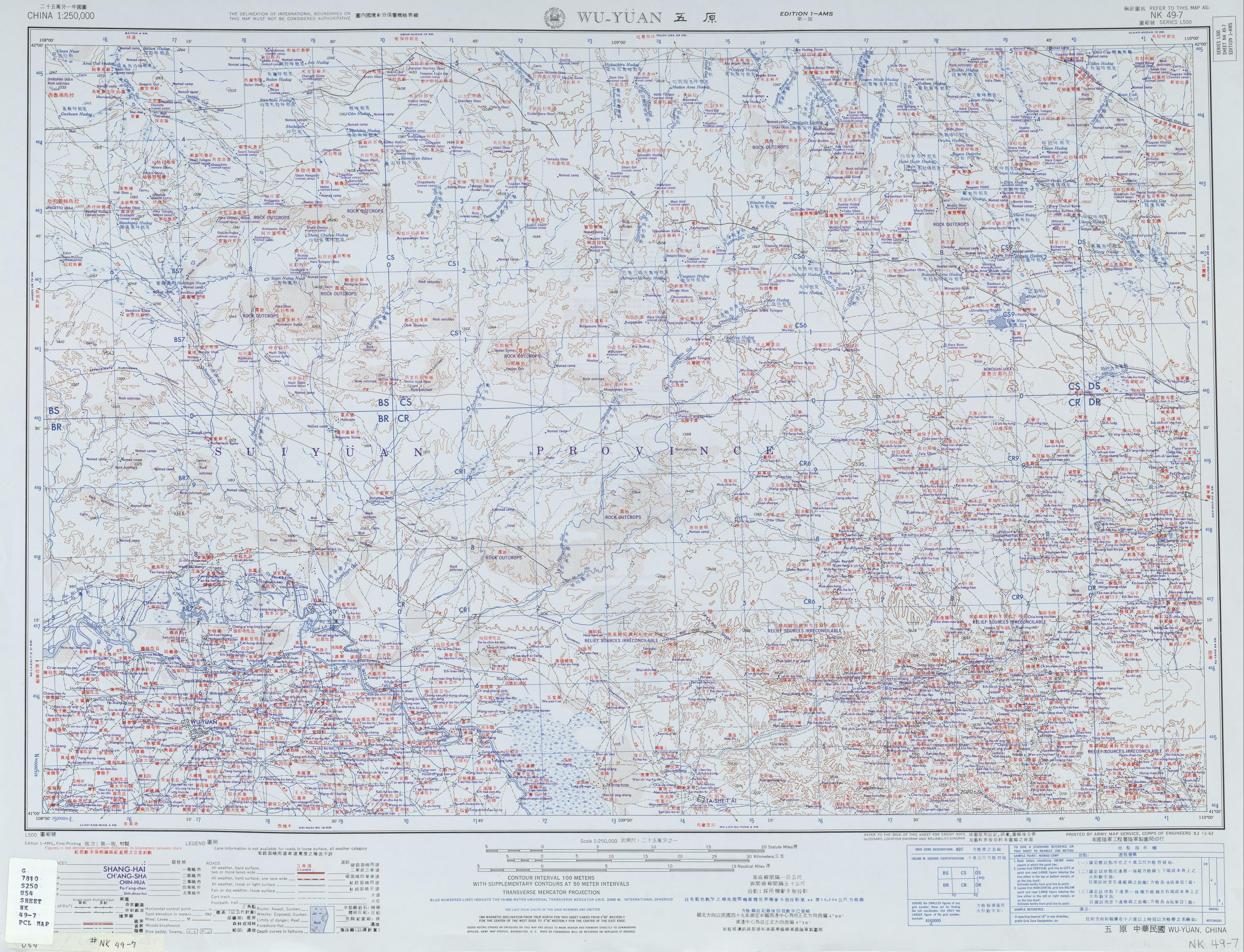
Map including Wuyuan (labeled as 五原 WU-YÜAN (walled)) (AMS, 1963)

== Administrative divisions ==
Wuyuan County is made up of 8 towns and 1 townships.

Name	Simplified Chinese	Hanyu Pinyin	Mongolian (Hudum Script)	Mongolian (Cyrillic)	Administrative division code
Towns
Longxingchang Town	隆兴昌镇	Lóngxīngchāng Zhèn	ᠯᠦᠩᠰᠢᠩᠴᠠᠩ ᠪᠠᠯᠭᠠᠰᠤ	Лүншнцан Балгас	150821100
Tarhu Town	塔尔湖镇	Tǎ'ěrhú Zhèn	ᠲᠠᠷᠬᠤ ᠪᠠᠯᠭᠠᠰᠤ	Дарху балгас	150821101
Bayan Tohoi Town	巴彦套海镇	Bāyàntàohǎi Zhèn	ᠪᠠᠶᠠᠨᠲᠣᠬᠣᠢ ᠪᠠᠯᠭᠠᠰᠤ	Баяндахуй балгас	150821102
Xingongzhong Town	新公中镇	Xīngōngzhōng Zhèn	ᠰᠢᠨ ᠭᠦᠩ ᠵᠦᠩ ᠪᠠᠯᠭᠠᠰᠤ	Шин хүн жүн балгас	150821103
Tianjitai Town	天吉泰镇	Tiānjítài Zhèn	ᠲᠢᠶᠠᠨ ᠵᠢᠢ ᠲᠠᠢ ᠪᠠᠯᠭᠠᠰᠤ	Даяан жийтэй балгас	150821104
Shengfeng Town	胜丰镇	Shèngfēng Zhèn	ᠱᠧᠩ ᠹᠧᠩ ᠪᠠᠯᠭᠠᠰᠤ	Шен фен балгас	150821105
Indert Town	银定图镇	Yíndìngtú Zhèn	ᠢᠨᠳᠡᠷᠲᠦ ᠪᠠᠯᠭᠠᠰᠤ	Индрад балгас	150821106
Fuxing Town	复兴镇	Fùxīng Zhèn	ᠹᠦᠰᠢᠩ ᠪᠠᠯᠭᠠᠰᠤ	Фүшин балгас	150821107
Township
Hesheng Township	和胜乡	Héshèng Xiāng	ᠾᠧ ᠱᠧᠩ ᠰᠢᠶᠠᠩ	Ге шен шиян	150821200

Other: Jianfeng Farm (建沣农场)

== Climate ==
Climate data for Wuyuan, elevation 1,023 m (3,356 ft), (1991–2020 normals, extremes 1981–2010)
Month	Jan	Feb	Mar	Apr	May	Jun	Jul	Aug	Sep	Oct	Nov	Dec	Year
Record high °C (°F)	6.3 (43.3)	15.9 (60.6)	23.3 (73.9)	32.7 (90.9)	35.5 (95.9)	38.0 (100.4)	39.1 (102.4)	35.4 (95.7)	35.4 (95.7)	27.3 (81.1)	16.3 (61.3)	10.3 (50.5)	39.1 (102.4)
Mean daily maximum °C (°F)	−4.0 (24.8)	1.7 (35.1)	9.0 (48.2)	17.8 (64.0)	24.3 (75.7)	29.0 (84.2)	30.5 (86.9)	28.3 (82.9)	23.2 (73.8)	15.6 (60.1)	5.2 (41.4)	−2.4 (27.7)	14.8 (58.7)
Daily mean °C (°F)	−10.7 (12.7)	−5.6 (21.9)	1.7 (35.1)	10.2 (50.4)	17.3 (63.1)	22.4 (72.3)	24.4 (75.9)	22.1 (71.8)	16.3 (61.3)	8.5 (47.3)	−0.8 (30.6)	−8.4 (16.9)	8.1 (46.6)
Mean daily minimum °C (°F)	−15.9 (3.4)	−11.3 (11.7)	−4.4 (24.1)	3.1 (37.6)	10.1 (50.2)	15.8 (60.4)	18.5 (65.3)	16.4 (61.5)	10.3 (50.5)	2.9 (37.2)	−5.3 (22.5)	−13.0 (8.6)	2.3 (36.1)
Record low °C (°F)	−29.0 (−20.2)	−24.7 (−12.5)	−21.3 (−6.3)	−9.4 (15.1)	−4.0 (24.8)	4.9 (40.8)	10.8 (51.4)	6.8 (44.2)	−1.8 (28.8)	−8.4 (16.9)	−18.5 (−1.3)	−25.5 (−13.9)	−29.0 (−20.2)
Average precipitation mm (inches)	1.2 (0.05)	2.1 (0.08)	4.8 (0.19)	5.4 (0.21)	15.2 (0.60)	22.2 (0.87)	40.7 (1.60)	43.7 (1.72)	31.2 (1.23)	8.0 (0.31)	3.0 (0.12)	0.8 (0.03)	178.3 (7.01)
Average precipitation days (≥ 0.1 mm)	1.2	1.3	1.7	1.8	4.0	5.2	7.8	7.0	5.7	2.7	1.4	1.2	41
Average snowy days	2.4	1.9	1.7	0.5	0.1	0	0	0	0	0.6	1.5	2.0	10.7
Average relative humidity (%)	59	49	43	36	37	44	55	59	56	55	60	59	51
Mean monthly sunshine hours	208.9	216.8	262.9	284.2	318.9	313.9	312.4	298.4	262.9	261.3	215.0	199.5	3,155.1
Percentage possible sunshine	70	71	70	71	71	69	69	71	71	77	74	70	71
Source: China Meteorological Administration
