= Suiyuan =

Historical province of China

Coordinates: 40.8106°N 111.652°E

Suiyuan Province 綏遠省
- Province of China
- Suiyuan as claimed by the Republic of China
- Capital: Kweisui
- Population
  - 1949: 2,000,000+
- History
  - Established as a province of the ROC: 1928
  - Reorganised as a province of the PRC: 1949
  - Incorporated into the Inner Mongolia Autonomous Region: 1954
Preceded by	Succeeded by
Suiyuan Special Administrative Region	Inner Mongolia

Suiyuan (simplified Chinese: 绥远; traditional Chinese: 綏遠; pinyin: Suíyuǎn; lit. 'Pacify the Distant Region'; abbreviation: 綏, pinyin: suí) was a historical province of China. Its capital was Kweisui (also written Guisui), now Hohhot. The area Suiyuan covered is approximated by today's prefecture-level cities of Hohhot, Baotou, Wuhai, Ordos, Bayan Nur, and parts of Ulanqab, all part of Inner Mongolia. Suiyuan was named after a district in the capital established during the Qing Dynasty.

In the early 1930s, Suiyuan was occupied by the Shanxi warlord Yan Xishan, who mined Suiyuan's iron, reorganized the province's finances, and brought over 4,000 acres (16 km^{2}) of land under cultivation for the first time. Most of the work and settlement of Suiyuan at this time was done by Shanxi farmer-soldiers under the direction of retired officers from Yan's army. Yan's control of Suiyuan was sufficient to cause one visiting reporter to refer to Suiyuan as a "colony" of Shanxi.

The Suiyuan campaign took place during the Second Sino-Japanese War. Suiyuan became a part of the puppet state of Mengjiang from 1937 to 1945 under Japanese rule.

During the Chinese Civil War, in 1935 Communist leader Mao Zedong had promised Mongol leaders a "unified autonomous" administration, which would include all "historic Mongol lands" within China, in exchange for Mongol support against the Kuomintang. This promise included the declaration that, "under no circumstances should other [non-Mongol ethnic groups] be allowed to occupy the land of the Inner Mongolian nation". However, following the communist victory in 1949, the administrators of the soon-to-be "Mongolian" territories with Han Chinese majorities, the biggest of which was Suiyuan with a population of over 2 million, resisted annexation by the new Inner Mongolia Autonomous Region. In 1954, Mao reached a compromise with Suiyuan, which involved the Mongols' taking over the administration of Suiyuan but stipulated that the Han natives not be expelled from the territory. Uradyn Bulag, professor at the University of Cambridge, thus noted that the Mongols' territorial ambitions against Suiyuan "ironically" resulted in them becoming a "small minority within their own autonomous region".

== In popular culture ==
- W. Douglas Burden references Suiyuan in his book Look to the Wilderness, in the chapter "On the Sino-Mongolian Frontier".

== See also ==
- Inner Mongolia § Republic of China and the Second World War periods
