= Jodbajab =

Mongolian military officer and politician (1876–1947)

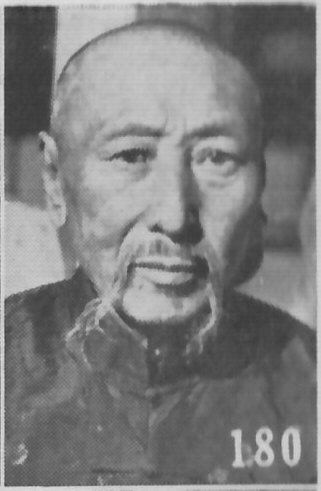
- Jodbajab as pictured in The Most Recent Biographies of Chinese Dignitaries
- Native name: ᠵᠤᠳᠪᠠᠵᠠᠪ
- Born: 1876
- Died: 1947 (aged 70–71) Ulaanbaatar, Mongolian People's Republic
- Allegiance: (Republic of China (1912–1949)) Republic of China; Mengjiang
- Service years: 1912–1947
- Rank: Lieutenant general
- Conflicts: Mongolian Revolution of 1911; Mongolian Revolution of 1921; Actions in Inner Mongolia (1933–1936); Suiyuan campaign

Chinese name
- Traditional Chinese: 卓特巴扎普
- Simplified Chinese: 卓特巴扎普
Transcriptions
Standard Mandarin
- Hanyu Pinyin: Zhuōtèbazhāpǔ
- Wade–Giles: Zhuó T'e Pa Tsa P'u

Jodbajab (Note: Mongolian: ᠵᠤᠳᠪᠠᠵᠠᠪ, Жодовжав; Chinese: 卓特巴扎普) (1876 – 1947), also known under the courtesy name of Shihai (Chinese: 什海 or 世海) was an Inner Mongolian military officer and government official during the late Qing dynasty and Mengjiang governments. He was an ethnic Mongol belonging to the Plain and Bordered White Banner of Xilin Gol League.

== Names ==
Historical sources refer to him under a variety of names:

- Jodubjab or Jodubdjabu, Roman spellings of his Mongolian name based on the Classical Mongolian alphabet
- Jodovjav, a transcription of Mongolian Cyrillic Жодовжав
- Shihai (Chinese: 什海; pinyin: Shíhǎi; Wade–Giles: Shih Hai or Chinese: 世海; pinyin: Shìhǎi; Wade–Giles: Shih Hai), his Chinese courtesy name
- Zhuo Shihai (Chinese: 卓什海; pinyin: Zhuō Shíhǎi; Wade–Giles: Tso Shih-hai), a Chinese name which takes the first character of the Chinese transcription of his Mongolian name (Chinese: 卓特巴扎普; pinyin: Zhuōtèbazhāpǔ, less commonly Chinese: 卓特巴扎布; pinyin: Zhuōtèbazhābù), followed by his Chinese courtesy name

== Career ==
During the Xinhai Revolution which overthrew the Qing, Khalkha Mongol banners declared independence as the state of Mongolia and occupied Dariganga, which was then under Jodubjab's jurisdiction. This occurred in March 1912. He led an attack in an attempt to recover the area, but on 28 August was taken prisoner and held in Urga (today Ulaanbaatar). He would be released in 1915 under the terms of the Treaty of Kyakhta (1915). After his return to Inner Mongolia, he was commended by Yuan Shikai's government and commissioned as a lieutenant general. From there he rose to become the senior amban in Chahar Province. During the Mongolian Revolution of 1921, he was dispatched in another attempt to re-establish control in Dariganga, but was driven out by Soviet Kalmyk troops and local partisans; the territory would thenceforth remain part of the state of Mongolia.

In March 1934, Jodubjab was appointed a member of the Chinese government's newly established Mongolian Local Autonomous Political Committee, along with Kesingge, Serengdongrub, Ünenbayan, and Nima-odsor of the Kuomintang, and various league and banner nobility such as Altanochir, Darijaya, and Gorjorjab (郭尔卓尔扎布). However, in early 1936, Nima-odsor, who was Jodubjab's close friend and advisor, was assassinated by the Japanese for his Mongol nationalism and opposition to Japanese expansionism. In response, Jodubajab, intimidated, began to collaborate with Japan's territorial designs on Inner Mongolia, sparking the ire of Mongol nationalists. In his position as commander of the Mongol militia, he endorsed Prince Demchugdongrub's telegram announcing the establishment of the Mengjiang government. In February of that year, he and Li Shouxin seized control of the postal administration in six districts of eastern Chahar Province. In November of that year, he participated in the Suiyuan campaign. In 1937 he was appointed one of two deputy commanders of the Mongol Pao An Tui (蒙古保安隊) along with Bao Yueqing.

Jodubajab was captured during the Soviet invasion of Manchuria during the final days of World War II and again taken to Ulaanbaatar as a prisoner, where he died.

== Bibliography ==
- Atwood, Christopher (2004), "Dariganga", Encyclopedia of Mongolia and the Mongol Empire, New York: Facts on File, ISBN 978-1-4381-2922-8
- 宝力格 — Bolig (July 2004), "内蒙古历史上的德穆楚克栋鲁普 — Demchugdongrub in Inner Mongolian History", 黑龙江省蒙古学研究会通讯 — Communications of the Heilongjiang Association for Mongolian Studies (20), archived from the original on 2011-08-14
- Hyer, Paul; Jagchid, Sechin (1983), A Mongolian living Buddha: biography of the Kanjurwa Khutughtu, SUNY Press, ISBN 978-0-87395-713-7
- 最新支那要人伝 — Newest Biographies of Important Figures in China, 朝日新聞社 Asahi Shimbun, 1941, OCLC 23310651
