= Nima-odsor =

Inner Mongolian politician (1894–1936)

- ᠨᠢᠮ᠎ᠠ-ᠣᠰᠤᠷ
- Born: 1894
- Died: 23 January 1936 (aged 41–42); Kalgan, Chahar Province, Republic of China (now Zhangjiakou, People's Republic of China)
- Known for: Assassination by Japanese agents
- Political party: Kuomintang

Chinese name
- Traditional Chinese: 尼瑪鄂特索爾
- Simplified Chinese: 尼玛鄂特索尔
Transcriptions
Standard Mandarin
- Hanyu Pinyin: Nímǎ'ètèsuǒ'ěr
- Wade–Giles: Ni-Ma-O-Teh-Su-Erh; Ne-Mo-Ngoh-Ta-U-Erh

Alternative Chinese name
- Traditional Chinese: 尼冠洲
- Simplified Chinese: 尼冠洲
Transcriptions
Standard Mandarin
- Hanyu Pinyin: Ní Guānzhōu
- Wade–Giles: Ni Kuan-chou

Nima-odsor (Note: Mongolian: ᠨᠢᠮ᠎ᠠ-ᠣᠰᠤᠷ, Ням-осор, romanized: Nyam-osor) (1894 – 23 January 1936), also known under the Chinese name of Ni Kuan-chou (Chinese: 尼冠洲) was a Mongol politician active in the Republic of China who was shot to death by Japanese assassins on an intercity bus ride.

== Career ==
Nima-odsor was a member of the Central Committee of the Kuomintang and of the Mongol Local Autonomy Political Affairs Committee. He was a close associate of Ünenbayan and Jodbajab. In January 1936, Nima-odsor, Ünenbayan, Serengdongrub, and Demchugdongrub went to Zhangbei for a meeting with Jodbajab. In that meeting, they discussed Jodbajab's deployment of cavalry police in six counties in northern Chahar Province (demilitarised by the Chin–Doihara Agreement in the wake of the North Chahar Incident) in response to Manchukuo troops' occupation of the area under Li Shouxin the previous month.

After the meeting ended, on 23 January Nima-odsor took a bus to return to Kalgan; gunmen in civilian clothes stopped the bus, boarded it, identified Nima-odsor, shot him at point blank range, and then fled without harming any other passengers. The Japanese denied any connection and claimed it had been done by Chinese agents. Newspaper reports at the time suggested Nima-odsor thought that Jodbajab had exceeded his authority and that there might be some conflict between the two. Later scholarly sources conclude that the assassination was a Japanese plot in response to Nima-odsor's Mongol nationalism and opposition to Japanese expansionism. In the aftermath, Demchugdongrub, who had been working with the Japanese, stated that he knew in advance of a (failed) Japanese plot to assassinate Ünenbayan, but the assassination of Nima-odsor came as a complete surprise to him, because he thought the latter would be protected by Jodbajab.

The most notable consequence of Nima-odsor's assassination was that his friend Jodbajab was intimidated into further cooperation with the Japanese, and joined Demchugdongrub's Mongol Military Government soon after.

== Bibliography ==
- Hyer, Paul; Sechin Jagchid (1983), A Mongolian living Buddha: biography of the Kanjurwa Khutughtu, SUNY Press, ISBN 978-0-87395-713-7
- Sechin Jagchid (1979), "Prince Gungsangnorbu: Forerunner of Inner Mongolian Modernization", Zentralasiatische Studien, 12: 147–158
- 张永昌 — Zhang Yongchang; 张翔鹰 — Zhang Xiangying (2006), "吴鹤龄死里终逃生 尼冠洲大意误失命 — Ünenbayan escapes death, Nima-odsor loses his life", 末代王爷传奇 — Biographies of royals at the end of an era, 作家出版社 — Writers' Publishing House, ISBN 978-7-5063-3730-4
