= Mongol Local Autonomy Political Affairs Committee =

Political body in the Republic of China (1934–36)

Founding meeting of the Pailingmiao Council in 1934.

The Mongol Local Autonomy Political Affairs Committee (蒙古地方自治政務委員會), also referred to as the Pailingmiao Council or Peilingmiao Council, was a political body of ethnic Mongols in the Republic of China between 1934 and 1936. The Nationalist government authorised its establishment in March 1934.

Map of the Pailingmiao Council and its constituent leagues and banners. Alxa and Ejin Banners Ulanqab League Yeke-juu League Eight Banners of Chahar Xilingol League

The Pailingmiao Council had jurisdiction over the following banners and leagues in Inner Mongolia:

- Ulanqab League
- Yeke-juu League
- Xilingol League
- Tumed Special Banner
- Alxa League
- Ejin Banner
- Eight Banners of Chahar

== Background ==
The Committee grew out of a visit by Huang Shaoxiong as an envoy to a Mongolian autonomy conference held at Bat-khaalag (Bailingmiao/Pailingmiao) in the aftermath of the Japanese annexation of Rehe Province. Fearful that the Mongols would side with the Japanese and cause China to lose further territory, Huang promised them that they could establish such an autonomous political committee and open up a direct line of communication with Nanjing. Chiang Kai-shek, knowing his government's limited power in Inner Mongolia left his options severely constrained, wrote in his private diary that he would have to grant the Mongols "whatever they desire short of complete political independence". Demchugdongrub served as secretary-general, while Yondonwangchug held the chairmanship.

== Membership ==
Members of the committee included various league and banner nobility:

- Yondonwangchug (head of Ulanqab League), chairman of the Committee
- Sodnam Labtan (索特那木拉布坦, head of Xilin Gol League), vice chairman of the Committee
- Shagdurjab (沙克都尔扎布, head of Yeke-juu League), vice-chairman of the Committee
- Demchugdongrub (deputy head of Xilin Gol League), general secretary of the Committee
- Altanochir (deputy head of Yeke-juu League)
- Babadorj (巴宝多尔济, jasagh of Urat Middle Banner)
- Jodbajab (nobleman of Chahar)
- Gongchok Lashe (贡楚克拉什, nobleman of Chahar)
- Darijaya (jasagh of Alxa Banner, Alxa League)
- Toktaghu (托克托胡, nobleman of East Ujimqin Banner, Xilin Gol League)
- Pandegunchab (潘迪恭扎布, jasagh of Dörbed, Ulanqab League)
- Namjilsereng (那木吉勒色楞, deputy head of Jerim League)

As well as a number of ethnic Mongol Kuomintang members:

- Ünenbayan (Jerim League representative in Beijing, Mongolian and Tibetan Affairs Commission member)
- Enkhbat (恩克巴图; Kuomintang Central Oversight Committee member)
- Serengdongrub (Kuomintang Central Executive Committee member, Mongolian and Tibetan Affairs Committee member)
- Kesingge (KMT Central Executive Committee reserve member, Mongolian and Tibetan Affairs Commission member)
- Nima-odsor (Kuomintang Central Committee member)

== Operation ==
The committee was officially inaugurated in a ceremony at Bailingmiao in April 1934. By late June, offices had been installed at the monastery and blessed by its priests. Their clashes with other regional authorities began immediately; both the committee and the government of Suiyuan Province under Fu Zuoyi attempted to levy tariffs on goods imported from Gansu. Regional nobility such as Shirabdorji of the Urad also did not cooperate with the committee; in August 1935, Suiyuan forces, seeking to take advantage of their conflict, again confronted Committee troops near Shirabdorji's residence, and forced them to cede further authority to him. The Nationalist government took little action in the conflict. Yondonwangchug, angered by this, threatened to dissolve the Committee in response. The Japanese military watched the conflict closely, and even had its air force make several illegal overflights of Suiyuan in late September.

== Collapse ==
In early 1936, the Japanese had Nima-odsor assassinated, sparking fear among the other Committee members, in particular his close associate Jodbajab, which led him to collaborate with the Japanese. In March 1936, Yondonwangchug resigned from the committee, after having been effectively retired since mid-1935. Shagdurjab was elevated to the chairmanship in his place, while Demchugdongrub was offered the vice-chairmanship. The council also opened a branch office at Kalgan, headed by Puyintala. The central government later ordered the committee to move to Chahar; however, the council itself opposed the order at a meeting the following week, apparently because they were reluctant to surrender authority to the new Suiyuan Mongol Council. That council, at Guisui (Hohhot), was under the control of Fu Zuoyi, and was also advised by Yan Xishan. Demchugdongrub and Yondonwangchug withdrew to Dehua and established the Mongol Military Government, leaving the Committee defunct.

== Bibliography ==
- 宝力格 — Bolig (July 2004), "内蒙古历史上的德穆楚克栋鲁普 — Demchugdongrub in Inner Mongolian History", 黑龙江省蒙古学研究会通讯 — Communications of the Heilongjiang Association for Mongolian Studies (20), archived from the original on 2011-08-14
- Cotton, James (1989), Asian frontier nationalism: Owen Lattimore and the American policy debate, Manchester University Press, ISBN 978-0-7190-2585-3
- Hyer, Paul; Jagchid, Sechin (1983), A Mongolian living Buddha: biography of the Kanjurwa Khutughtu, SUNY Press, ISBN 978-0-87395-713-7
- Lin, Hsiao-ting (2010), Modern China's Ethnic Frontiers: A Journey to the West, Taylor and Francis, ISBN 9780415582643
- 张永昌 — Zhang Yongchang; 张翔鹰 — Zhang Xiangying (2006), 末代王爷传奇 — Biographies of royals at the end of an era, 作家出版社 — Writers' Publishing House, ISBN 978-7-5063-3730-4
