= Demchugdongrub =

Chinese Mongol prince (1902–1966)

Khong Tayiji Demchugdongrub
- ᠳᠡᠮᠴᠣᠭᠳᠣᠩᠷᠤᠪ
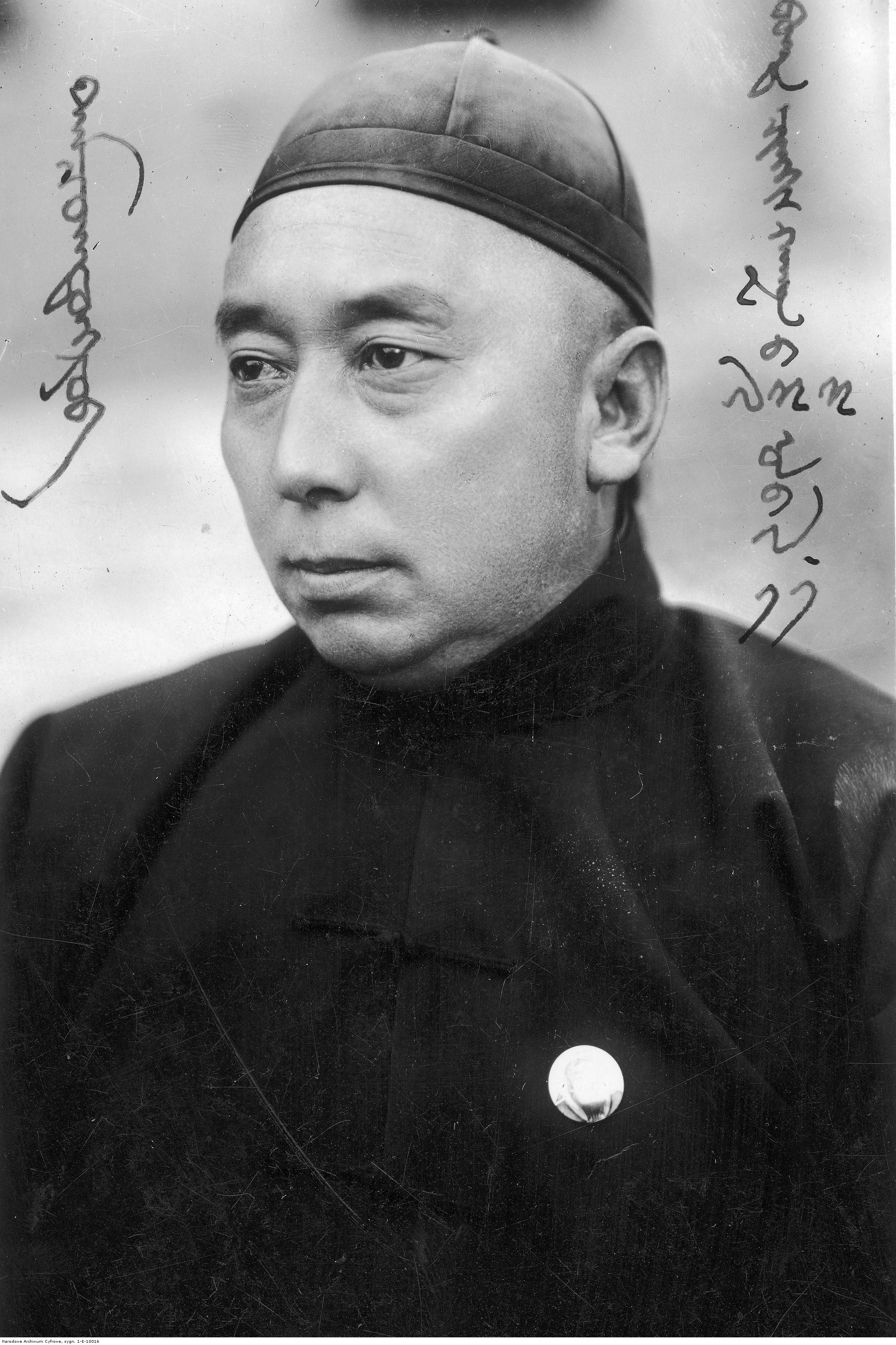
- Demchugdongrub in 1938

President of the Mongolian Autonomous Government
- In office 10 August 1949 – 20 September 1949
- Preceded by: Himself (as Chairman of the Mongolian Autonomous Preparatory Committee)
- Succeeded by: Darijaya (as President of the Western Mongolian Autonomous Government)

Chairman of the Mongolian Autonomous Preparatory Committee
- In office 16 April 1949 – 10 August 1949
- Preceded by: Altanochir
- Succeeded by: Himself (as President of the Mongolian Autonomous Government)

Chairman of the Mongolian Autonomous State
- In office 4 August 1941 – 19 August 1945
- Preceded by: Himself (as Chairman of the Mengjiang United Autonomous Government)
- Succeeded by: Position abolished

Chairman of the Mengjiang United Autonomous Government
- In office 1 September 1939 – 4 August 1941
- Preceded by: Himself (as Chairman of the Mongol United Autonomous Government)
- Succeeded by: Himself (as Chairman of the Mongolian Autonomous State)

Chairman of the Mongol United Autonomous Government
- In office 1 July 1938 – 1 September 1939
- Preceded by: Yondonwangchug
- Succeeded by: Himself (as Chairman of the Mengjiang United Autonomous Government)
Committee positions
President of the Administrative Council of the Mengjiang United Autonomous Government
In office 1 September 1939 – 31 May 1941
Preceded by	Himself (as President of the Administrative Council of the Mongol United Autonomous Government)
Succeeded by	Wu Heling
Chairman of the General Affairs Committee of the Mengjiang Joint Committee
In office 29 April 1939 – 11 June 1939
Preceded by	Shōji Kanai
Succeeded by	Position abolished
Vice-Chairman of the Mongol United Autonomous Government
In office 28 October 1937 – 1 July 1938
Preceded by	Sodnam Labtan and Shagdurjab (as Vice-Chairmen of the Mongol Military Government)
Succeeded by	Li Shouxin
President of the Administrative Council of the Mongol United Autonomous Government
In office 28 October 1937 – 1 September 1939
Preceded by	Himself (as President of the Mongol Military Government)
Succeeded by	Himself (as President of the Administrative Council of the Mengjiang United Autonomous Government)
Chairman of the Chahar–Xilingol League Military and Political Committee
In office 26 March 1937 – 28 October 1937
Preceded by	Position established
Succeeded by	Position abolished
Chairman of the Mongolian Political Committee
In office 18 January 1937 – 28 October 1937
Preceded by	Position established
Succeeded by	Position abolished
Chairman of the Chahar Provincial Mongolian Leagues and Banners Local Autonomy Political Affairs Committee
In office 27 July 1936 – 5 November 1936
Preceded by	Himself (as Chairman of the Mongol Local Autonomy Political Affairs Committee)
Succeeded by	Position abolished
President of the Mongol Military Government
In office 12 May 1936 – 28 October 1937
Preceded by	Position established
Succeeded by	Himself (as President of the Administrative Council of the Mengjiang United Autonomous Government)
Chairman of the Mongol Local Autonomy Political Affairs Committee
In office 30 April 1936 – 27 July 1936
Preceded by	Sodnam Labtan
Succeeded by	Himself (as Chairman of the Chahar Provincial Mongolian Leagues and Banners Local Autonomy Political Affairs Committee)
Vice-Chairman of the Mongol Local Autonomy Political Affairs Committee
In office 8 January 1936 – 30 April 1936 Serving with Shagdurjab
Preceded by	Sodnam Labtan
Succeeded by	Jodbajab and Linqin Wangdute (as Vice-Chairmen of the Chahar Provincial Mongolian Leagues and Banners Local Autonomy Political Affairs Committee)
Secretary-General of the Mongol Local Autonomy Political Affairs Committee
In office 23 April 1934 – 8 January 1936
Preceded by	Position established
Succeeded by	Gorjorjab

Personal details
- Born: 8 February 1902 Sonid Right Banner, Xilingol League, Inner Mongolia, China
- Died: 23 May 1966 (aged 64) Hohhot, Inner Mongolia, China
- Relatives: House of Borjigin (Royal family of Mengjiang)
- Occupation: Politician
- Awards: Order of the Rising Sun; Mongolia Military Merit Medal

Military service
- Allegiance: Mengjiang
- Branch/service: Inner Mongolian Army
- Years of service: 1936–45
- Rank: General
- Commands: Inner Mongolian Army
- Battles/wars: Second Sino-Japanese War; Suiyuan Campaign; Operation Chahar; Battle of Taiyuan; World War II; Manchurian Strategic Offensive Operation
Chinese-character names
Chinese name
- Traditional Chinese: 德穆楚克棟魯普
- Simplified Chinese: 德穆楚克栋鲁普
Transcriptions
Standard Mandarin
- Hanyu Pinyin: Démùchǔkèdònglǔpǔ
- Wade–Giles: Te-mu-ch‘u-k‘e-tung-lu-p‘u
- IPA: [tɤ̌mûʈʂʰùkʰɤ̂tʊ̂ŋlùpʰù]
Mongolian name
- Mongolian Cyrillic: Дэмчигдонров
- Mongolian script: ᠳᠡᠮᠴᠣᠭᠳᠣᠨᠷᠤᠪ
Transcriptions
- SASM/GNC: Demčugdongrub
Chinese name
- Chinese: 德王
- Literal meaning: King De'
Transcriptions
Standard Mandarin
- Hanyu Pinyin: Dé Wáng
- Wade–Giles: Te Wang
Mongolian name
- Mongolian Cyrillic: Дэ Ван
Xixian (courtesy name)
- Traditional Chinese: 希賢
- Simplified Chinese: 希贤
Transcriptions
Standard Mandarin
- Hanyu Pinyin: Xīxián
- Wade–Giles: Hsi-hsien

Demchugdongrub (Mongolian: ᠳᠡᠮᠴᠣᠭᠳᠣᠨᠷᠤᠪ, romanized: Demchigdonrov, [tɪmt͡ʃʰəktɔŋrəw], Chinese: 德穆楚克棟魯普, 8 February 1902 – 23 May 1966), also known as Prince De (Chinese: 德王), was a Mongol prince of the Borjigin clan who led the autonomy movement in Inner Mongolia. During the Second Sino-Japanese War, he headed a series of Japanese-backed Mongol regimes, including the Mongol Military Government and the puppet state of Mengjiang, which was established in 1939. After the war he received asylum from the Kuomintang, and in 1949 he briefly led a Mongolian autonomous government in Alxa before fleeing to the Mongolian People's Republic, which handed him over to China in 1950. He was pardoned in 1963 and spent his last years in Hohhot.

== Early life ==
Demchugdongrub was a Chahar born into the Plain White Banner of the Eight Banners of Chahar during the Qing dynasty. He was the sole son of Namjil Wangchuk, the Duoluo Duling Junwang (多羅杜棱郡王 Duōluō Dùléng Jùnwáng) of the Sönid Right Banner and Chief of the Xilingol League. His name consists of the Tibetan words "Chakrasamvara" (Wylie: bde mchog) and "Siddhartha" (Wylie: don grub) respectively.

After Namjil Wangchuk died in 1908, the six-year-old Demchugdongrub, with the approval of the Qing, inherited one of his father's titles – the Duoluo Duling Junwang. In his youth Demchugdongrub studied the Mongolian, Chinese, and Manchu languages. After the fall of the Qing, Yuan Shikai promoted Demchugdongrub to the title of Jasagh Heshuo Duling Jinong (扎薩克和碩杜棱亲王 Zhāsàkè Héshuò Dùléng Qīnwáng) in 1912.

Demchugdongrub married a daughter of a Taiji (Qing aristocratic title) nobleman from his own Sönid Right Banner, and the next year had their first child, Dolgorsuren (都古爾蘇隆 Dōugǔ'ěrsūlóng). Several years later, Demchugdongrub had four more sons and one daughter with his second wife, Fujin (福晉 Fújìn), a daughter of another Taiji nobleman from the Abaga Banner.

== Political career ==
In September 1933, the Mongol princes of Chahar Province and Suiyuan traveled to the temple at Bailingmiao, north of Guihua (now Hohhot), and gathered in a council chamber with Demchugdongrub, who for months had been trying to found a pan-Mongol self-rule movement. In mid-October, despite their traditional suspicions of one another, they and Demchugdongrub agreed to draw up confederation documents for the Inner Mongolian banners. They informed Nanjing that they intended to rule Inner Mongolia themselves and indicated that, if the Chinese government obstructed them, they would not hesitate to seek help from Japan. In response, Nanjing sent Huang Shaohong as an envoy, and he eventually authorized the creation of the Mongol Local Autonomy Political Affairs Committee.

In an interview with the Welsh journalist Gareth Jones on 14 July 1935, Demchugdongrub said that his aim was "a unified Mongolia without outside influence". He said that the Mongols preferred to rely on the Chinese, and that he would turn to Japan only if China treated the Mongols badly. In August 1935, the American minister in China, Nelson T. Johnson, reported that Demchugdongrub's representative in Beiping had told a source that Japanese officers, including the chief of staff of the Kwantung Army, had offered to supply him with arms and money and to give him Hsingan Province if he declared independence. According to the report, Demchugdongrub put them off by saying that he first wanted to consolidate the Inner Mongolian Mongols under his leadership, and he felt that he could obtain no help from China because the national government had never treated the Mongols sincerely.

=== Collaboration with Japan ===
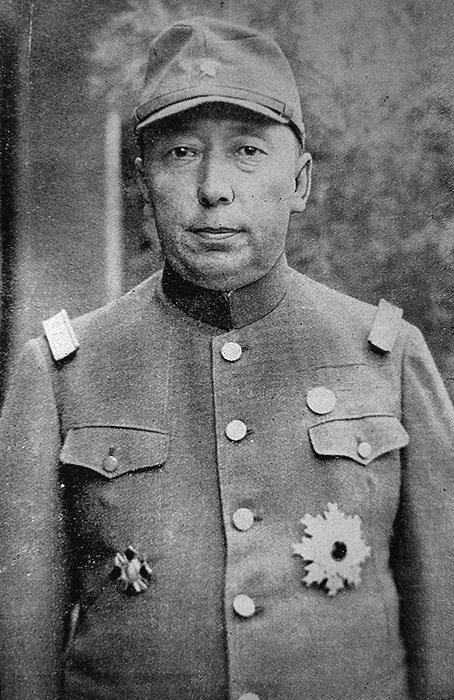
Demchugdongrub in his Japanese-style uniform

According to the judgment of the International Military Tribunal for the Far East, Jirō Minami, the commander of the Kwantung Army, and Seishirō Itagaki gave earnest support to the creation of an Inner Mongolian autonomous government under Demchugdongrub, which they intended to be subservient to Japan. In April 1935, Minami sent Ryūkichi Tanaka and another officer to interview Demchugdongrub, but he did not come to terms with them at that time. When he met Minami in August 1935, he promised close cooperation with Japan, and Minami promised him financial assistance.

In June 1935, the North Chahar Incident led to the Chin–Doihara Agreement. Under the agreement, all units of the Chinese 29th Army were withdrawn from the districts north of Changpei, the maintenance of order there was entrusted to the Peace Preservation Corps, and Chinese were barred from migrating to and settling in northern Chahar. Activities of the Kuomintang and anti-Japanese institutions were also banned in Chahar.

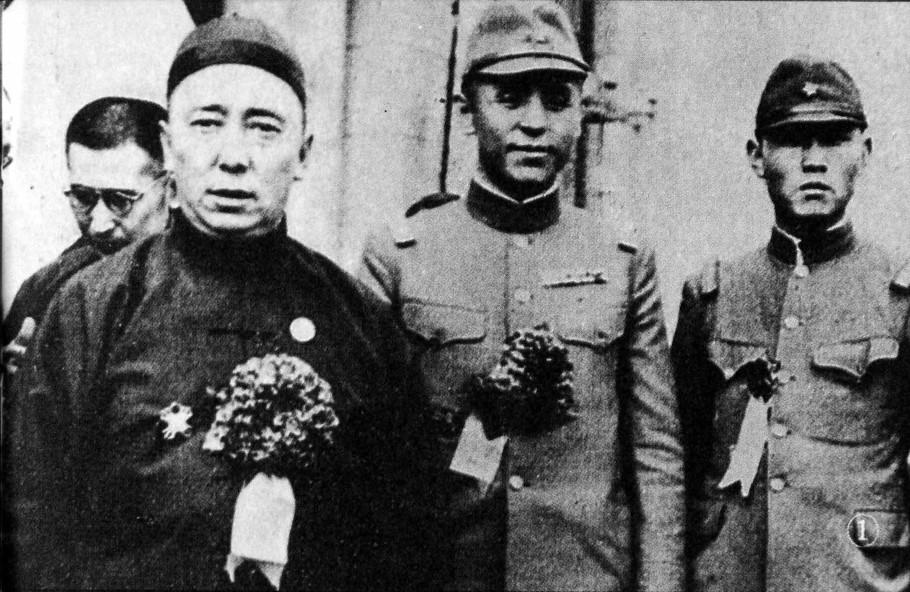
Demchugdongrub (left) and Li Shouxin (center)

In December 1935, Minami sent two battalions of cavalry to help Demchugdongrub take over the northern part of Chahar. On 11 February 1936, Demchugdongrub moved the seat of his autonomous regime from Bailingmiao to West Sunit, and Japanese civilians were sent there to act as his advisers. The tribunal cited a Japanese Army plan of January 1936 as showing that the regime was supported and controlled by the Kwantung Army.

From 21 to 26 April 1936, Demchugdongrub and Li Shouxin met the Japanese Special Service chief Tanaka at West Wuchumuhsin, at a meeting attended by representatives from across Inner Mongolia as well as from Qinghai and Outer Mongolia. This "State-Founding Conference" adopted plans to found a Mongolian state comprising Mongolia and Qinghai, to establish a monarchy run for the time being by a committee, to found a Mongolian congress, to organize a military government and to conclude a mutual assistance agreement with Manchukuo. According to the General History of the Mongols, the Mongol Military Government that was then set up vowed to "inherit the great spirit of Genghis Khan, recover Mongolia's inherent territory and complete the great cause of national revival".

By June 1936, the seat of the regime had moved to Dehua, and in July 1936 it concluded an agreement with Manchukuo that provided for mutual political and economic aid. A Japanese plan aimed to increase its cavalry divisions from three to nine, and Minami and Itagaki supported the creation of the Mongolian state. In March 1937, the American embassy reported that the Japanese officers running the regime had been replaced by others who were apparently ordered to treat the Mongols better, and that Demchugdongrub had only three to four thousand troops, mostly Jehol Mongols under Li Shouxin.

=== Suiyuan campaign ===
In March 1936, Manchukuo troops occupying Chahar invaded north-eastern Suiyuan, which was controlled by the Shanxi warlord Yan Xishan, and seized Bailingmiao, where the pro-Japanese Inner Mongolian Autonomous Political Council had its headquarters. Three months later, Demchugdongrub, as head of the council, declared himself the ruler of an independent Mongolia and organized an army with Japanese equipment and training. His Inner Mongolian Army lacked ideological unity, was poorly trained and had rifles for only half of its soldiers, and its morale and cohesion were poor. It totaled about 10,000 men, and a Chinese collaborationist force, the Grand Han Righteous Army under Wang Ying, was attached to it.

In August 1936, Demchugdongrub's army attempted to invade eastern Suiyuan, but it was defeated by Yan's forces under the command of Fu Zuoyi. While Demchugdongrub rebuilt his forces, Japanese agents carefully sketched and photographed Suiyuan's defenses. In November 1936, he presented Fu with an ultimatum to surrender. When Fu replied that Demchugdongrub was merely a puppet of "certain quarters" and asked him to submit to the authority of Chiang Kai-shek's central government, Demchugdongrub's Mongolian and Manchurian armies launched a more ambitious attack. This time, his 15,000 soldiers were armed with Japanese weapons, supported by Japanese aircraft and often led by Japanese officers.

In anticipation of the attack, Japanese spies destroyed a large supply depot in Datong and carried out other acts of sabotage. Yan placed his best troops and most able generals, including Zhao Chengshou and his son-in-law Wang Jingguo, under Fu's command. In the month of fighting that followed, Demchugdongrub's army suffered severe casualties, and Fu's forces occupied Bailingmiao on 24 November 1936. Fu considered invading Chahar but was warned by the Kwantung Army that doing so would provoke an attack by the Japanese Army. Demchugdongrub's forces repeatedly tried to retake Bailingmiao, but Fu responded by sending troops north, seizing the last of Demchugdongrub's bases in Suiyuan and virtually annihilating his army. After Japanese were found fighting in Demchugdongrub's army, Yan publicly accused Japan of aiding the invaders, and his victories were praised by Chinese newspapers, political leaders, students and other members of the Chinese public.

=== Mengjiang ===
After the outbreak of the Second Sino-Japanese War in July 1937, Japanese forces under Itagaki advanced along the Beiping–Suiyuan Railway and occupied Guisui, the capital of Suiyuan, on 14 October 1937. The Japanese then organized an autonomous federation, Mengjiang, which was intended to rule Mongolia and Xinjiang, with Demchugdongrub at its head. The Mengjiang United Autonomous Government was established in Kalgan (now Zhangjiakou) on 1 September 1939, with Demchugdongrub as head of state. In 1940, it was nominally placed under Wang Jingwei's government in Nanjing, although it retained its autonomous status. In February 1941, Demchugdongrub made a state visit to Tokyo. In September 1945, Time described him as an "exalted puppet" of the Japanese.

=== Downfall ===
Demchugdongrub fled Kalgan before the regime collapsed in August 1945 and sought asylum from the Kuomintang government. According to the Hoover Institution, Chiang overlooked his wartime collaboration, reportedly because Demchugdongrub might help to stabilize the Kuomintang's position in post-war Inner Mongolia. In August 1949, shortly before the founding of the People's Republic of China, he established the Mongolian Autonomous Government in Alxa Banner. With the rapid advance of the People's Liberation Army in north-western China, he fled on 20 September 1949 to Guaizihu in Ejin Banner, taking the state seal with him. The remaining officials, headed by Darijaya, reorganized the government into the Western Mongolian Autonomous Government and negotiated a peaceful transfer of authority with Yang Dezhi on 5 October 1949. They surrendered to the Communist forces by 15 October 1949, and the administration was renamed the Alasha Khoshut Banner People's Government.

== Later life ==
On 29 December 1949, encouraged by the leaders of the Mongolian People's Republic, Demchugdongrub fled to Outer Mongolia with his secretary Tseren-dorji, his aide-de-camp Tumendelger and two guides. He invited Li Shouxin and the generals Sukhbaatar and Ombagatur to join him there, leaving the remaining officials to negotiate surrender arrangements with the Communist authorities. Despite an initially warm welcome, he was interned on 27 February 1950, arrested on 1 March 1950 and handed over to China on 18 September 1950. He was pardoned in April 1963.

After his release, he worked at an Inner Mongolian history museum in Hohhot until his death on 23 May 1966.

== Legacy ==
Some see Demchugdongrub as a Mongol nationalist promoting Pan-Mongolism, while others view him as a traitor and a pawn of the Japanese during World War II. In February 2026, the Hoover Institution acquired an original photograph album of his 1941 visit to Tokyo, together with a manuscript and report by Shōji Kanai, the Mengjiang regime's chief political adviser from 1939 to 1941.

== See also ==
- Second Sino-Japanese War
- Mengjiang
- Inner Mongolia

== Books ==
- Bisson, Thomas Arthur (1973). Japan in China. New York: Octagon Books. ISBN 0-374-90640-8.
- Gillin, Donald G. (1967). Warlord: Yen Hsi-shan in Shansi Province 1911–1949. Princeton, New Jersey: Princeton University Press. ISBN 0-374-90640-8.
- Gui Ruigui (2005). China's Anti-Japanese War Combat Operations (中国抗日战争正面战场作战记) (in Chinese). China: Jiangsu People's Publishing House. ISBN 7-214-03034-9.
- Hsu Shuhsi (1937). The North China Problem. Shanghai: Kelly and Walsh.
- Jagchid, Sechin (1999). The Last Mongol Prince: The Life and Times of Demchugdongrob, 1902–1966. Western Washington University. ISBN 978-0914584216.
- Jowett, Philip (2004). Rays of the Rising Sun, Volume 1: Japan's Asian Allies 1931–45, China and Manchukuo. Helion and Company Ltd. ISBN 1-874622-21-3.
- Liu Xiaoyuan (2004). Frontier Passages: Ethnopolitics and the Rise of Chinese Communism, 1921–1945. Washington, D.C.: Woodrow Wilson Center Press. ISBN 0-8047-4960-4.
- Wang Bing (2008). Cultural Sustainability: An Ethnographic Case Study of a Mongol High School in China. New York: Routledge. ISBN 978-0-8058-5724-5.
- Lin Hsiao-ting (2010). Modern China's Ethnic Frontiers: A Journey to the West. Taylor and Francis. ISBN 9780415582643.

== Documents ==
- Judgement of the International Military Tribunal for the Far East, Chapter 5: Japanese Aggression Against China
