= Yondonwangchug =

Inner Mongolian noble and politician (1870–1938)

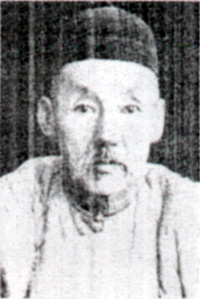

Chairman of the Mongol Military Government
- In office 12 May 1936 – 24 March 1938
- Preceded by: Position established
- Succeeded by: Demchugdongrub

Personal details
- Born: 1870 Darhan Muminggan United Banner, Qing dynasty
- Died: 24 March 1938 (aged 67–68) Mongol United Autonomous Government (now China)

Chinese name
- Traditional Chinese: 雲端旺楚克
- Simplified Chinese: 云端旺楚克
Transcriptions
Standard Mandarin
- Hanyu Pinyin: Yúnduān Wàngchukè
- Wade–Giles: Yün^{2}-tuan^{1} Wang^{4}-ch'u^{3}-k'o^{4}

Yondonwangchug (Note: Mongolian: ᠶᠦᠩᠳᠦᠩ ᠸᠠᠩᠴᠤᠭ; Chinese: 雲端旺楚克) (1870 – 24 March 1938) was an Inner Mongolian nobleman of Ulanqab League and politician under the Qing Dynasty, Republic of China and Mengjiang governments.

== Names ==
His name Yondonwangchug, also spelled Yondonvanchig or Yunden Wangchuk, is of Tibetan origin and is transcribed into Chinese as Chinese: 雲端旺楚克; pinyin: Yúnduān Wàngchukè. For short, he is referred to as Prince Yun, a translation of Chinese: 雲王; pinyin: Yún Wáng.

== Career ==
Yondonwangchug was born in 1870 in what is today Darhan Muminggan United Banner. In his early years, he studied the Tibetan and Chinese languages. He became deputy head of Ulanqab League in 1896. In 1924, he established the banner's first school.

In 1934, he took up the chairmanship of the Mongol Local Autonomy Political Affairs Committee under the Nanjing government. However, he was frustrated by its limited authority and clashes with Suiyuan Province authorities under Fu Zuoyi. Angered by Shirabdorji's uncooperative attitude towards the committee, in October 1935 Yondonwangchug attempted to strip Shirabdorji of his titles, and sent troops to Shirabdorji's residence; Shirabdorji responded that the council had no power to order his dismissal or appoint new officials to his positions, which were, after all, hereditary. There, Yondonwangchug's forces clashed with Fu's; the Nanjing government did little to intervene. After the incident he went into virtual retirement, and formally resigned in March 1936.

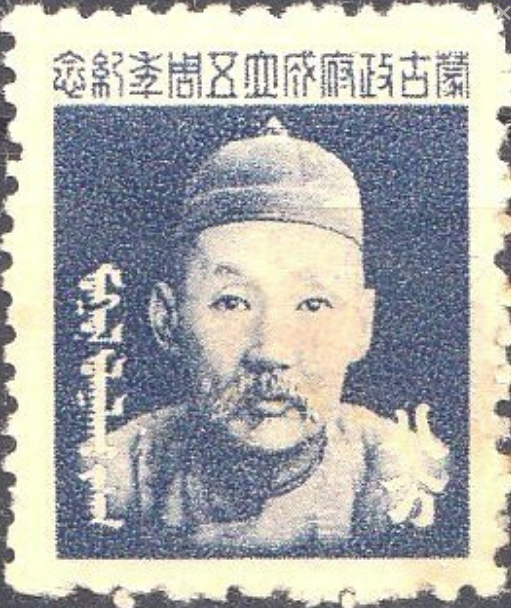
Yondonwangchug on a stamp of Mengjiang in 1944

Yondonwangchug was named chairman of the pro-Japanese Mongol Military Government when it was established in April 1936. In July 1936, a newspaper account states that he was arrested on a visit to Bailingmiao and held in the military headquarters there, and charged with high treason. In October 1937 he was announced as the chairman of the new Mongol United Autonomous Government. He died in July 1938, reportedly by poisoning.

== Bibliography ==
- Lin, Hsiao-ting (2010), Modern China's Ethnic Frontiers: A Journey to the West, Taylor and Francis, ISBN 9780415582643
- Lin, Hsiao-ting (2006), Tibet and nationalist China's frontier: intrigues and ethnopolitics, 1928–49, UBC Press, ISBN 978-0-7748-1301-3
