= Urad =

Urad may refer to:

- Urad Mongols, a tribe in Inner Mongolia
- Urad, a region in Bayannur, Inner Mongolia
  - Urad Front Banner
  - Urad Middle Banner
  - Urad Rear Banner
- Urad (bean), a bean used in Indian cuisine
- Urad, Poland
- abbreviation of microradian (μrad, urad), a unit of angle
