= Kesingge (politician) =

Chinese Mongolian politician and typefounder

- 克興額
- Born: Harqin Right Banner
- Known for: Creation of a Mongolian script type metal; Participation in the Mongol Local Autonomy Political Affairs Committee
- Political party: Kuomintang

Kesingge (Chinese: 克興額; pinyin: Kèxìngé), also known by the Chinese name Li Chih-nan (Chinese: 李指南; pinyin: Li Zhǐnán), was an Inner Mongolian politician of the Republic of China in the 1930s.

== Career ==
Kesingge was a native of Harqin Right Banner. He was a reserve member of the Kuomintang's Central Executive Committee. Later on, Shi Qingyang (石青陽) tapped him to work for the Mongolian and Tibetan Affairs Commission as Ünenbayan's secretary, in response to increased pressure being put on the commission by Demchugdongrub. In 1934, Kesingge was one of four ethnic Mongol Kuomintang members appointed to the Mongol Local Autonomy Political Affairs Committee when it was created, along with Enkhbat, Serengdongrub, and Ünenbayan.

While working for the Mongolian and Tibetan Affairs Commission, around 1933 he created a set of metal movable type for the Mongolian script. It was used primarily in Nanjing by the Mongolian and Tibetan Affairs Committee and the KMT's public relations division, as well as some churches in Kalgan. The typeface was functional but not particularly attractive, though Kesingge continued to make improvements to it during the period of its use; regardless, it seems to have been superseded by 1937.

== Bibliography ==
- 陳鵬仁 — Chen Pangren (1999), 近代中日關係史論集 — Collected materials on the history of modern China–Japan relations, 五南圖書出版股份有限公司 — Wunan Book Publishing Company Ltd., ISBN 978-957-11-1916-8
- 忒莫勒 — Tüimer (2006), "喀喇沁克興額與蒙文鉛字印刷 — Kexinge from Kalaqin and Mongolian type printing", Journal of Inner Mongolia Normal University: Philosophy and Social Science, 35 (1); alternative URL
- 张永昌 — Zhang Yongchang; 张翔鹰 — Zhang Xiangying (2006), 末代王爷传奇 — Biographies of royals at the end of an era, 作家出版社 — Writers' Publishing House, ISBN 978-7-5063-3730-4
