= Astragalus hoantchy =

Scientific classification
- Kingdom: Plantae
- Clade: Embryophytes
- Clade: Tracheophytes
- Clade: Spermatophytes
- Clade: Angiosperms
- Clade: Eudicots
- Clade: Rosids
- Order: Fabales
- Family: Fabaceae
- Subfamily: Faboideae
- Genus: Astragalus
- Species: A. hoantchy

Binomial name
- Astragalus hoantchy Franch.

Synonyms
- Astragalus hedinii Ulbr.

Species of flowering plant

Astragalus hoantchy, the Urad huang qi, is a species of flowering plant in the family Fabaceae, native to China; Gansu, Inner Mongolia, Ningxia, and Qinghai. It is widely cultivated for use in Chinese and Mongolian traditional medicine.
