= Mongolian Autonomous Republic =

Inner Mongolian political entity in the 20th century

Mongolian Autonomous Government 蒙古自治政府
- 1949
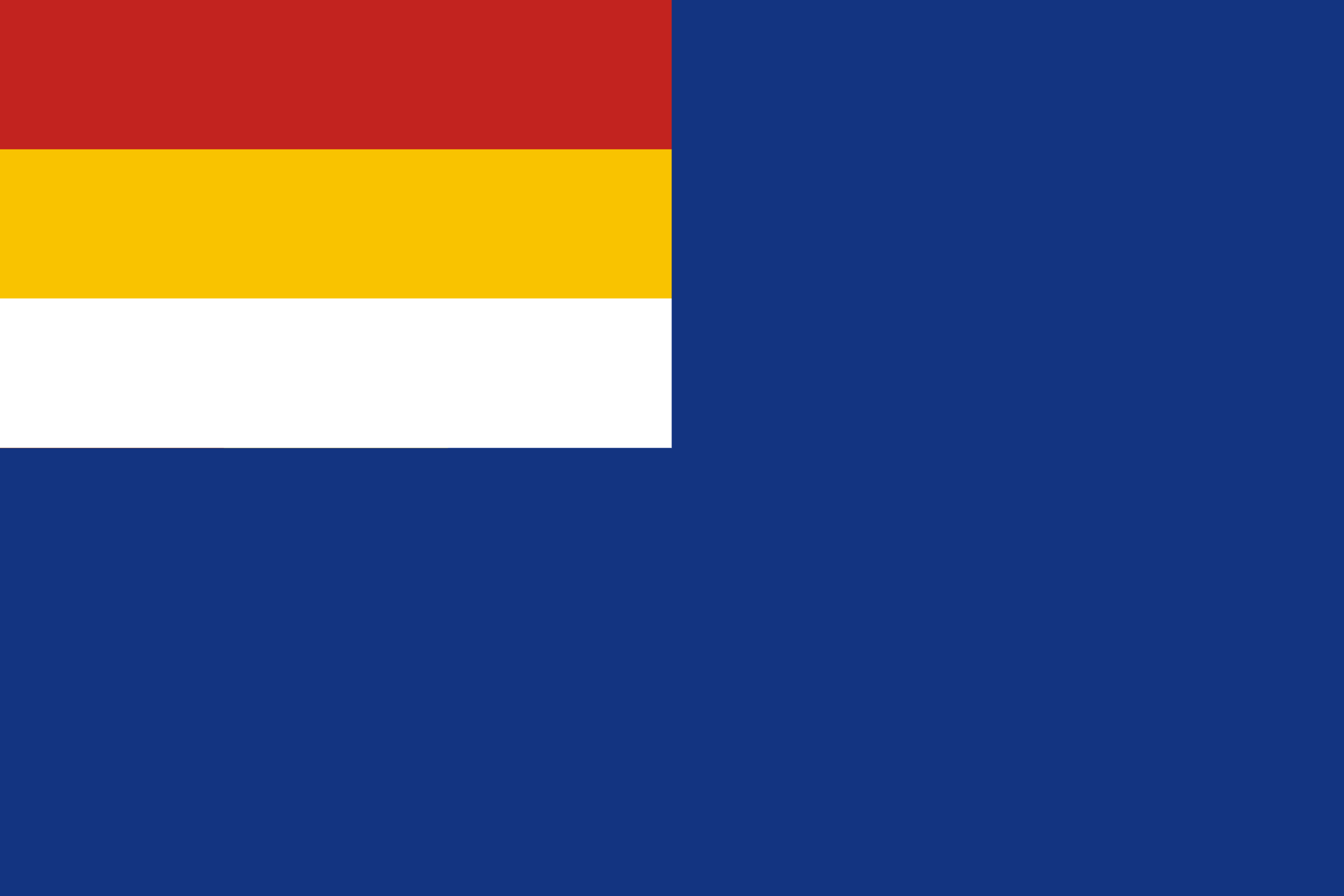
- Flag of the Republic, designed by Demchugdongrub and based on the Mongol Military Government's flag
- Status: Political project
- Capital: Bayanhot
- Demonym: Mongols
- Government: Provisional government
- President
  - 1949: Demchugdongrub
- Vice-President
  - 1949: Darijaya
- Legislature: Mongolian People’s Delegate Conference
- Historical era: Chinese Civil War
  - Proclamation: 10 August 1949
  - Dissolution: September–October
- Today part of: China

The Mongolian Autonomous Government (Chinese: 蒙古自治政府; pinyin: Měnggǔ Zìzhì Zhèngfǔ), also known as the Mongolian Alashan Republic, was a short-lived political entity proclaimed in 1949 in the Alashan region of western Inner Mongolia during the final phase of the Chinese Civil War. According to historian P. N. Dudin, it functioned primarily as a political project promoted by Mongolian aristocratic elites with the support of the Kuomintang (KMT), rather than as a fully consolidated independent state.

== History ==
=== Background ===
The Alxa region, corresponding largely to the modern Alxa League of the Inner Mongolia Autonomous Region, was historically governed through the Mongolian banner (khoshun) system under the Qing dynasty. Despite the collapse of Qing authority in 1911, hereditary Mongolian nobles retained significant local influence during the Republican period.

During the 1930s and 1940s, Inner Mongolia became a contested political space involving the Republic of China, the Chinese Communist Party, Japan, and local Mongolian elites. The establishment of the Japanese-backed state of Mengjiang (1936–1945) strengthened Mongolian nationalist movements, though these were heavily dependent on external powers.

Following Japan’s defeat in 1945, Mengjiang was dissolved, and its leader Demchugdongrub was arrested by Nationalist authorities. Political instability persisted in Inner Mongolia, and the Autonomous Government of Inner Mongolia was formed. While eastern Inner Mongolia increasingly came under Communist influence, western regions such as Alxa remained under Kuomintang (KMT) control and were administratively linked to Ningxia.

=== Establishment ===
In April 1949, a congress of Mongolian nobles and representatives convened in Dingyuanying (modern Bayanhot). The assembly followed traditional kurultai procedures and established a commission tasked with preparing the creation of a Western Mongolian autonomous state.

On 10 August 1949, the Mongolian Autonomous Government was formally proclaimed. Demchugdongrub (Prince De) was elected President, with Darijaya serving as Vice-President. The government was composed largely of former Mengjiang officials and members of the Mongolian aristocracy. It relied heavily on KMT support and lacked a broad social base.

==== Government and administration ====
The political structure combined elements of traditional Mongolian aristocratic authority with modern state institutions. Executive authority was concentrated in the presidency, while administration relied on existing banner structures and noble networks. Key government officials included Bayankhan (Chinese: 巴文峻, secretary-general of the Secretariat), Bai Haifeng (Chinese: 白海風, head of the Bureau of Industry), He Zhaolin (Chinese: 何兆麟, head of the Internal Affairs Bureau), and Oljeibuyan (Chinese: 吳熙憲, head of the Bureau of Finance). The Peace Preservation Committee was also established to reorganize military forces and support troops loyal to Prince De.

=== Collapse ===
The rapid advance of the People’s Liberation Army in northwestern China in September 1949 threatened the survival of the Alxa Republic. Key cities in Qinghai and Ningxia fell, isolating Alashan from remaining KMT-held territory. On September 20, 1949, Demchugdongrub fled the region to Guaizihu in Ejin Banner, taking the state seal with him. Remaining officials, headed by Darijaya, reorganized the decaying Mongolian Autonomous Government into the Western Mongolian Autonomous Government [zh], and negotiated a peaceful transfer of authority with Yang Dezhi on October 5, 1949, thus surrendering to Communist forces by October 15, 1949 and renaming administration to Alasha Khoshut Banner People's Government [zh].

With the collapse of his government, Prince De maintained contacts with the Mongolian People's Republic. On December 29, 1949, lured by the PRM leaders, he fled to Outer Mongolia with his secretary Tseren-dorji, aide-de-camp Tumendelger, and two other guides. He invited key generals Li Shouxin, Sukhbaatar and Ombagatur to join him there, leaving the remaining officials to negotiate surrender arrangements with Communist authorities. Despite initial warm welcome, he was interned on February 27, 1950, arrested on March 1, 1950 and subsequently extradited to China on September 18, 1950.

Of more than 1,200 followers, over 400 joined the Alashan Peace Preservation Troops, around 400 returned home, about 100 were reassigned for study or government employment, and another 100–200 attempted to flee but were intercepted or killed.

== Flag and symbols ==
The republic adopted a flag closely modeled on the flag of the Mongol Military Government, with a blue field and a rectangular canton in the upper hoist, containing three horizontal stripes: red, yellow, and white.

== Historical assessment ==
Historian P. N. Dudin characterizes the Mongolian Alashan Republic as the final attempt by Mongolian aristocratic elites and the KMT to establish an autonomous Mongolian polity within China. The project failed due to its dependence on external sponsors, lack of mass support, and the military victory of the Chinese Communist Party.

== See also ==
- Mengjiang
- Demchugdongrub
- Chinese Civil War
