= Altanochir (1882–1949) =

Chinese Mongolian jasagh, politician, and lieutenant general (1882–1949)

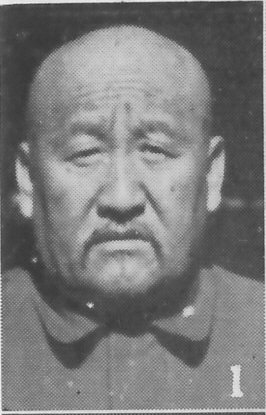
- Altanochir as pictured in The Most Recent Biographies of Chinese Dignitaries

Jasagh of the Right Rear Ordos Banner
- Reign: 1909 – 1943
- Successor: Banner abolished
- Born: 1882
- Died: 16 April 1949 (aged 66–67)
- Military career
- Allegiance: (Taiwan) Republic of China; Mongol United Autonomous Government; Mengjiang
- Branch: National Revolutionary Army; Inner Mongolian Army
- Rank: Lieutenant general

Chinese name
- Traditional Chinese: 阿勒坦鄂齊爾
- Simplified Chinese: 阿勒坦鄂齐尔
Transcriptions
Standard Mandarin
- Hanyu Pinyin: Ālātǎnèqíěr
- Wade–Giles: A La T'an O Ch'i Erh

Altanochir (Note: Mongolian: ᠠᠯᠲᠠᠨᠸᠴᠢᠷ, Алтан-Очир; Chinese: 阿拉坦鄂齊爾) (1882 – 16 April 1949) was an Inner Mongolian jasagh, politician, and general under the Republic of China and Mengjiang governments. He served as deputy head of Yeke-juu League (today Ordos City). An ethnic Mongol, he was a native of Right-Wing Rear Banner, Ordos (today administered as Hanggin Banner, Ordos City).

== Names ==
His Mongolian name may be spelled two different ways, with a variety of transcriptions of his Mongolian name into Chinese characters:

- Altanochir or Altan Ochir (Chinese: 阿拉坦鄂齊爾; pinyin: Ālātǎnèqíěr), his Mongolian name
- Altanvachir or Altan Vachir (Chinese: 阿勒唐瓦齊爾 or 阿勒唐瓦其爾; pinyin: Ālētángwǎqíěr), an earlier transcription of his Mongolian name

For short, he was sometimes referred to as Prince A. or A. Wang (from Chinese 阿王).

== Career ==
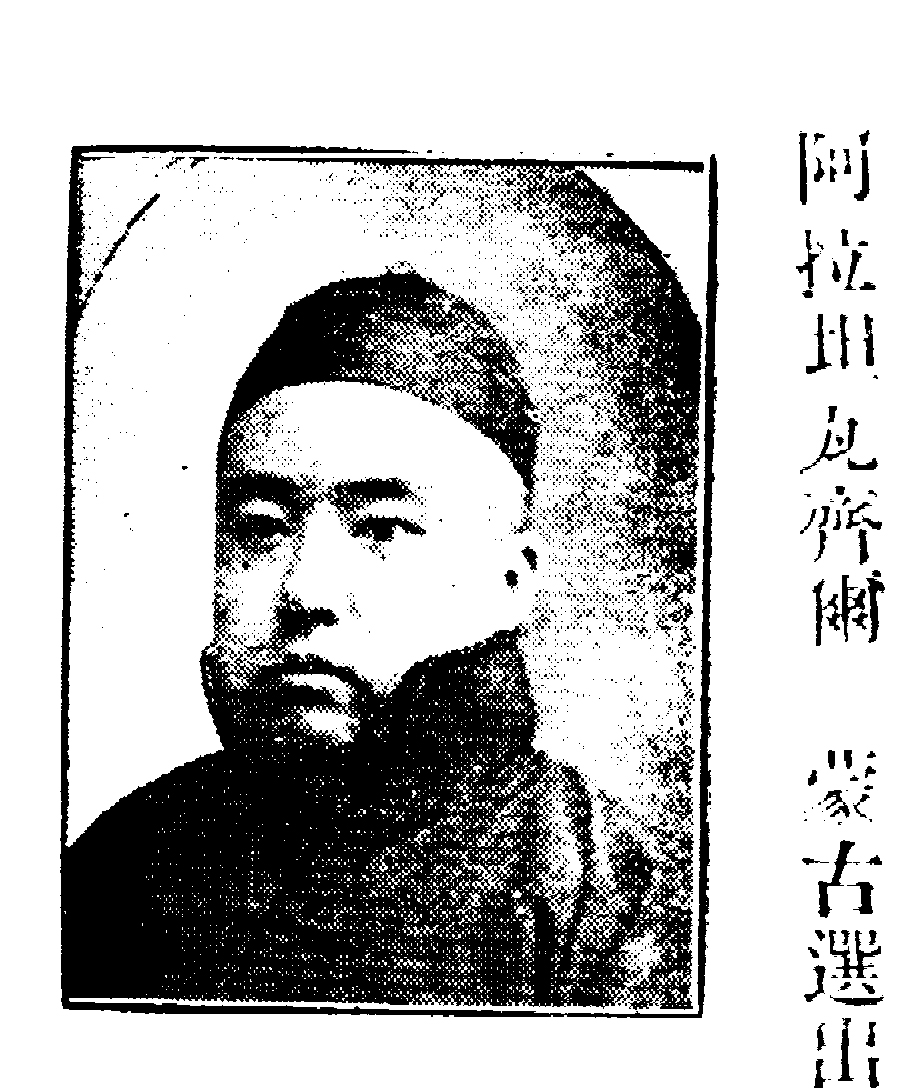
Altanochir in 1919

Altanochir was appointed as the deputy head of Yeke-juu League in 1919. He was also a soldier in the Republic of China's National Revolutionary Army; in 1928 he became deputy commander (副司令) for the Baotou region. In March 1934, he was appointed a member of the Nanjing government's newly established Mongolian Local Autonomous Political Committee. He sided with Prince Pandegunchab of Dörbed Banner, Ulanqab League in opposing the Mongol autonomy movement. He was promoted to the rank of lieutenant general in 1937.

However, he would join the pro-Japanese Mongol United Autonomous Government after its establishment in 1937. He took up the position of deputy head of Yeke-juu league under that government as well in February 1938. Previously a close friend of local warlord Fu Zuoyi, he asked Prince Demchugdongrub to send troops to help him break out of the control of Fu Zuoyi and join Demchugdongrub's autonomy movement. Overlooking Altanochir's former friendship with the warlord and his questionable loyalty to the Mongol autonomy movement, Demchugdongrub agreed to send one cavalry brigade in the spring of 1938 to assist him. After the formation of the Mengjiang United Autonomous Government in October 1939, Altanochir became a member of the Mongol Revival Committee (興蒙委員會) and general commander of the Ordos Army (鄂爾多斯挺進軍). In 1947 after the war had ended, he returned to his position as deputy head of Yeke-juu league. In early 1949 he was named a member of the Mongol Autonomous Preparatory Committee (蒙古自治籌備委員會) at Dingyuanying (定遠營; today Bayan Hot, Alxa League); he died there on 16 April 1949.

== Bibliography ==
- 宝力格 — Bolig (July 2004), "内蒙古历史上的德穆楚克栋鲁普 — Demchugdongrub in Inner Mongolian History", 黑龙江省蒙古学研究会通讯 — Communications of the Heilongjiang Association for Mongolian Studies (20), archived from the original on 2011-08-14
- Guan, Guangyao; Wu, Jianhui (1999), Historical treasures of China: a collection of rare manuscripts from the archives of Inner Mongolia Autonomous Region, Inner Mongolia Archives Department, ISBN 978-962-683-049-9
- Jagchid, Senchin (1999), The Last Mongol Prince: The Life and Times of Demchugdongrob, 1902-1966, Center for East Asian Studies, Western Washington University, ISBN 978-091-458-421-6
- Hyer, Paul; Jagchid, Sechin (1983), A Mongolian living Buddha: biography of the Kanjurwa Khutughtu, SUNY Press, ISBN 978-0-87395-713-7
- 徐友春 — Xu Youchun, ed. (2007), 民国人物大辞典 — Biographical Dictionary of the Republic of China, 河北人民出版社 — Hebei People's Publishing House, ISBN 978-7-202-03014-1
- 最新支那要人伝 — Newest Biographies of Important Figures in China, 朝日新聞社 — Asahi Shimbun Company, 1941, OCLC 23310651
