= Royal family of Mengjiang =

Japanese puppet ruling family in Inner Mongolia (1939–45)

Chinggisid
- Parent house: Borjigin
- Country: Mengjiang
- Founded: 1 September 1939; 87 years ago
- Founder: Demchugdongrub
- Current head: Currently inactive
- Final ruler: Demchugdongrub
- Titles: Head of state of Mengjiang; Khong Tayiji

The royal family of Mengjiang was the family of Prince Demchugdongrub, the puppet ruler of Mengjiang, a part of Inner Mongolia controlled by the Japanese during the Second Sino-Japanese War. While Mengjiang was a de-jure military dictatorship, the state was a de-facto monarchy. Prince Demchugdongrub was a descendant of the Borjigins, the clan to which Genghis Khan also belonged.

== Dynastic members ==
- Demchugdongrub, Mongol prince of the Qing dynasty and ruler of Mengjiang
- Namjilvaanchig (Намжилваанчиг), Demchugdongrub's father and the chief of the Xilinguole Alliance
- Erentsoo (Эрэнцоо), Demchugdongrub's wife
- Dugarsüren (Дугарсүрэн), Demchugdongrub's son
- Batnasan (Батнасан), Demchugdongrub's daughter

== Non-dynasty relatives ==
- Shanqi, a distant relative of Demchugdongrub
- Kawashima Yoshiko, Shanqi's child
