= Wu Heling =

Inner Mongolian politician

- ᠦᠨᠡᠨᠪᠠᠶᠠᠷ
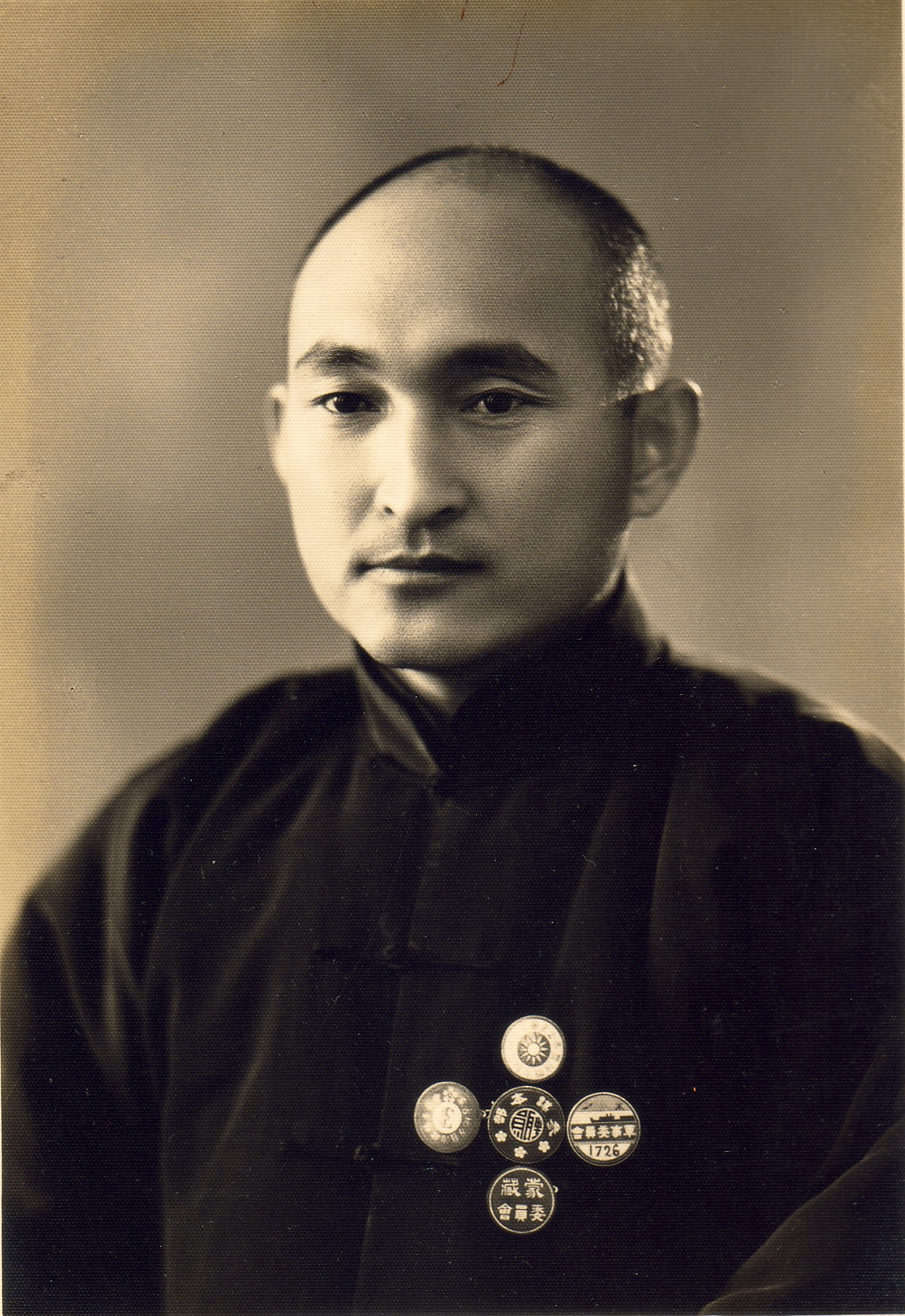
- Wu in 1934

President of the House of Counselors of Mengjiang
- In office October 1937 – September 1939

Personal details
- Born: 1896 Harqin Right Banner, Qing dynasty
- Died: 1980 (aged 83–84) Taichung, Taiwan
- Education: Peking University

Chinese name
- Traditional Chinese: 吳鶴齡
Transcriptions
Standard Mandarin
- Hanyu Pinyin: Wú Hèlíng
- Wade–Giles: Wu Ho-ling
Southern Min
- Hokkien POJ: Gô͘ Ho̍k-lêng

Courtesy name
- Traditional Chinese: 梅軒
Transcriptions
Standard Mandarin
- Hanyu Pinyin: Méixuān
- Wade–Giles: Mei-hsuen
Southern Min
- Hokkien POJ: Mûi-hian

Wu Heling (simplified Chinese: 吴鹤龄; traditional Chinese: 吳鶴齡; pinyin: Wú Hèlíng; 1896 – 1980) was a politician in the Republic of China. He was born in Harqin Right Banner, Josutu League (now Harqin Banner, Chifeng), Inner Mongolia. His Mongolian name was Ünenbayal. (Note: Mongolian: ᠦᠨᠡᠨᠪᠠᠶᠠᠷ, Үнэнбаяр) He was ethnic Mongol, and participated in the Mongolian Autonomous Movement. Heling became an important politician in the Mongolian United Autonomous Government and the Mongolian Autonomous Federation (蒙古自治邦).

== Early life and education ==
Wu graduated from the Chengde Normal School in what was then Rehe Province, and afterwards the Beijing Law College. In 1918 he entered Peking University, while he worked at the Ministry of Interior of the Beiyang Government. He also provided support to jasagh Gungsangnorbu of Harqin Right Banner at the office for Mongolian and Tibetan Affairs. At that time, he also worked at Beijing Normal University and was vice-secretary-general of the Beijing Young Christian Association. He graduated from Peking University in 1926, and not long after joined the Kuomintang.

== Political career ==
In April 1929 Wu was appointed chief of the office for Mongolian Banner to Beiping, and Counselor of the Mongolian and Tibetan Affairs Commission, National Government. The following January he transferred to the position of Chief Office for Mongolian Affairs of the Mongolian and Tibetan Affairs Commission. In June 1932 he returned to his old job as the Counselor of the Commission. In March 1934 he was appointed a member of the Mongol Local Autonomy Political Affairs Committee and of the Mongolian and Tibetan Affairs Commission. In September he was appointed Chief of Counselor of the Counseling Agency, Mongolian Local Autonomy Political Council.

In May 1936 Yondonwangchug and Demchugdongrub established Mengjiang, in which Wu also participated: he was appointed Director of the Counseling Bureau and Sub-General (參議部部長兼總裁幫辦) and to other positions. In October 1937 he was appointed President of the House of Counselors of Mengjiang. In September 1939 he became Counselor of the House of Counselors in that government. He was promoted to the position of Chairman of the House the following year. In 1941 he was appointed President of the House for Political Affairs, Mongolian Autonomous Federation. Later he also sat as President of the Preparatory School for Studying in Japan.

After the Mongolian Autonomous Federation collapsed, Wu returned to Chiang Kai-shek's National Government, and was appointed Chief of the Advertising Association of the Military Commission. In 1949 he participated in the Western Mongolian Autonomous Movement; after the failure of this movement, he escaped to Taiwan.

Wu died in 1980 in Taichung, Taiwan.

== Bibliography ==
- Atwood, Christopher (1992), "The East Mongolian Revolution and Chinese Communism", Mongolian Studies, 15: 7–83
- Xu Youchun (徐友春) (main ed.) (2007), Unabridged Biographical Dictionary of the Republic, Revised and Enlarged Version (民国人物大辞典 增订版), Hebei People's Press (Hebei Renmin Chubanshe; 河北人民出版社), ISBN 978-7-202-03014-1
- 近代蒙古族历史人物,《吴鹤龄》 Archived 2011-07-14 at the Wayback Machine Mongolian Culture Web (蒙古文化网站)
- Who's Who in China 5th ed. (中國名人錄 第五版), The China Weekly Review (Shanghai) (上海密勒氏評論報), 1936, OCLC 3444157
- Liu Shoulin (刘寿林) (etc.ed.) (1995), Chronological Table of the Republic's Officers (民国职官年表), Zhonghua Book Company, ISBN 7-101-01320-1
- Committee for Problems of East Asia (東亜問題調査会） (1941), Newest Bibliographies of Important Figures in China (最新支那要人伝), Asahi Shimbun, OCLC 23310651
