= Darijaya =

Chinese Mongolian jasagh and politician (1904–1968)

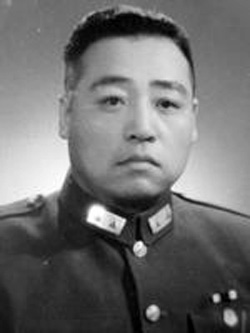

Jasagh of the Alxa League
- Reign: 1931 – 1968
- Predecessor: Davaanbülügjala
- Born: 6 January 1904
- Died: 8 November 1968 (aged 64)
- Spouse: Jin Yuncheng (m. 1925; died 1968)
- House: Borjigin

Chinese name
- Traditional Chinese: 達理扎雅
- Simplified Chinese: 达理扎雅
Transcriptions
Standard Mandarin
- Hanyu Pinyin: Dálǐzhāyǎ
- Wade–Giles: Ta^{2}-li^{3}-cha^{1}-ya^{3}

Darijaya (Note: Mongolian: ᠳᠠᠷᠢᠵᠠᠶᠠᠭ᠎ᠠ, romanized: Dari J̌ayaga, Mongolian: Дарьзаяа; Chinese: 達理扎雅) (6 January 1904 – 8 November 1968) was an Inner Mongolian jasagh of the Alxa League and a politician under the Republic of China and People's Republic of China governments.

== Names ==
Darijaya's Mongolian name was transcribed into Chinese characters as Chinese: 達理扎雅; pinyin: Dálǐzhāyǎ. Romanization of his Mongolian name in Joint Sino-Mongolian Transliteration system [zh] is Dari J̌ayaga, while in Mongolian Cyrillic alphabet it's Дарьзаяа. He was known for short as Prince Ta (達王). He also used the Chinese courtesy name Ruì Sūn (銳蓀).

== Life ==
A member of the Borjigin clan, Darijaya was a descendant of Genghis Khan's younger brother Hasar. He was a prince of Alxa League, then administered by Ningxia. In 1925, he married Jin Yuncheng (金允誠), a member of the Manchu Aisin Gioro clan, daughter of Zaitao and cousin of Puyi. In 1931, upon the death of his father, he was named jasagh of Alxa Banner. In his new position he carried out various reforms, including closing the old yamen and establishing a new government staffed with young, educated people. In 1934, he was named a member of the Nanjing government's Mongol Local Autonomy Political Affairs Committee. Imperial Japanese Army general Kenji Doihara was known to have paid a visit to him, leading to suspicions regarding his loyalty. In March 1938, fearing that Darijaya planned to defect to the Japanese, Ma Hongkui had him detained and brought to Yinchuan on the pretext of ensuring his safety. He and his wife would be held under house arrest for more than six years. He returned to his banner in August 1944, and took up a position on the Kuomintang's 8th Central Committee.

However, in August of the following year, he broke away from the KMT government in August 1949, and officially announced his allegiance to the new Communist government on 23 September. He continued in politics, rising to the position of vice-chairman of the Inner Mongolia Autonomous Region under chairman Ulanhu and head of Bayan Nur League in 1956, while also maintaining his position as the head of Alxa Banner. However, when the Cultural Revolution began, Red Guards attacked his family and destroyed his house and ancestral tombs. He went to Beijing seeking the help of Zhou Enlai. but Red Guards forced him to return to Inner Mongolia and subjected him to numerous struggle sessions. He died in one such session on 8 November 1968.

== Bibliography ==
- Barnett, Doak (1948-09-30), Tingyuanying, Alashan Territory, Ninghsia (PDF), Institute of Current World Affairs
- 宝力格 — Bolig (July 2004), "内蒙古历史上的德穆楚克栋鲁普 — Demchugdongrub in Inner Mongolian History", 黑龙江省蒙古学研究会通讯 — Communications of the Heilongjiang Association for Mongolian Studies (20), archived from the original on 2011-08-14
- 马西巴图 — Mashbat (2000), 阿拉善右旗志 — Records of Alashan Right Banner, Hohhot: Inner Mongolia Education Press, ISBN 978-7-5311-4276-8
- 杨建新 — Yang Jianxin (2009), 中国西北少数民族通史：民国卷 — General history of Northwest China's minority ethnic groups: Republic of China, Beijing: Nationalities Publishing House, ISBN 978-7-105-09928-3
