= Darhan Muminggan United Banner =

Darhan Muminggan United Banner 达尔罕茂明安联合旗 • ᠳᠠᠷᠬᠠᠨ ᠮᠤᠤᠮᠢᠩᠭᠠᠨ ᠬᠣᠯᠪᠣᠭᠠᠲᠤ ᠬᠣᠰᠢᠭᠤ
- Banner
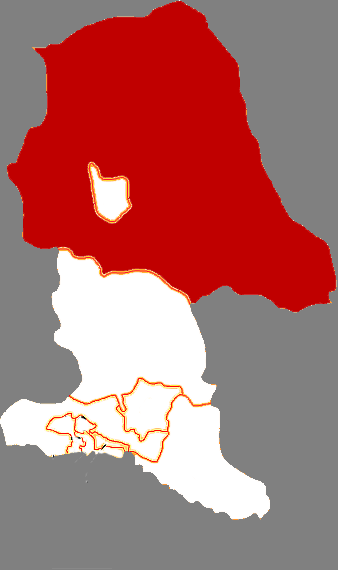
- Location in Baotou

- Location within Inner Mongolia Location within China
- Coordinates: 41°42′N 110°26′E
- Country: China
- Autonomous region: Inner Mongolia
- Prefecture-level city: Baotou
- Banner seat: Bailingmiao

Area
  - Total: 17,482.29 km^{2} (6,749.95 sq mi)
- Elevation: 1,372 m (4,501 ft)

Population (2020)
  - Total: 69,563
  - Density: 3.9791/km^{2} (10.306/sq mi)
- Time zone: UTC+8 (China Standard)
- Website: www.dmlhq.gov.cn

Darhan Muminggan United Banner

Chinese name
- Simplified Chinese: 达尔罕茂明安联合旗
- Traditional Chinese: 達爾罕茂明安聯合旗
Transcriptions
Standard Mandarin
- Hanyu Pinyin: Dá'ěrhǎn Màomíng'ān Liánhé Qí}

Mongolian name
- Mongolian Cyrillic: Дархан Муумянган холбоот хошуу
- Mongolian script: ᠳᠠᠷᠬᠠᠨ ᠮᠤᠤᠮᠢᠩᠭᠠᠨ ᠬᠣᠯᠪᠣᠭᠠᠲᠤ ᠬᠣᠰᠢᠭᠤ
Transcriptions
- SASM/GNC: Darqan Muumiŋghan Qolboghatu qosighu

Darhan Muminggan United Banner (Mongolian: ᠳᠠᠷᠬᠠᠨ ᠮᠤᠤᠮᠢᠩᠭᠠᠨ ᠬᠣᠯᠪᠣᠭᠠᠲᠤ ᠬᠣᠰᠢᠭᠤ; Chinese: 达尔罕茂明安联合旗) is a banner of west-central Inner Mongolia, People's Republic of China. It is under the administration of Baotou City, 125 kilometres (78 mi) to the south-southwest.

== Administrative divisions ==
Darhan Muminggan United Banner is made up of 7 towns, 2 townships, and 3 sums.

Name	Simplified Chinese	Hanyu Pinyin	Mongolian (Hudum Script)	Mongolian (Cyrillic)	Administrative division code
Towns
Mandal Town	满都拉镇	Mǎndūlā Zhèn	ᠮᠠᠨᠳᠤᠯ ᠪᠠᠯᠭᠠᠰᠤ	Мандал балгас	150223102
Xar Moron Town	希拉穆仁镇	Xīlāmùrén Zhèn	ᠰᠢᠷᠠᠮᠥ᠋ᠷᠡᠨ ᠪᠠᠯᠭᠠᠰᠤ	Ширмран балгас	150223103
Bailingmiao Town (Bathaalag Town)	百灵庙镇	Bǎilíngmiào Zhèn	ᠪᠠᠲᠤᠬᠠᠭᠠᠯᠭ᠎ᠠ ᠪᠠᠯᠭᠠᠰᠤ	Батхаалга балгас	150223104
Xabar Hure Town	石宝镇	Shíbǎo Zhèn	ᠰᠢᠪᠠᠷᠬᠦ᠋ᠷᠢᠶ᠎ᠡ ᠪᠠᠯᠭᠠᠰᠤ	Шивэргүүрээ балгас	150223105
Uher Hudag Town	乌克忽洞镇	Wūkèhūdòng Zhèn	ᠦᠬᠡᠷ ᠬᠤᠳᠳᠤᠭ ᠪᠠᠯᠭᠠᠰᠤ	Үхэр худаг балгас	150223106
Minggan Town	明安镇	Míng'ān Zhèn	ᠮᠢᠩᠭᠠᠨ ᠪᠠᠯᠭᠠᠰᠤ	Мянган балгас	150223107
Bayan Hua Town	巴音花镇	Bāyīnhuā Zhèn	ᠪᠠᠶᠠᠨᠬᠤᠸᠠ ᠪᠠᠯᠭᠠᠰᠤ	Баянхуа балгас	150223108
Sums
Darhan Sum	达尔汗苏木	Dá'ěrhàn Sūmù	ᠳᠠᠷᠬᠠᠨ ᠰᠤᠮᠤ	Дархан сум	150223213
Qagan Had Sum	查干哈达苏木	Chágànhādá Sūmù	ᠴᠠᠭᠠᠨᠬᠠᠳᠠ ᠰᠤᠮᠤ	Цаанахта сум	150223214
Bayan Obo Sum	巴音敖包苏木	Bāyīn'áobāo Sūmù	ᠪᠠᠶᠠᠨᠣ᠋ᠪᠣᠭ᠎ᠠ ᠰᠤᠮᠤ	Баянөваа сум	150223215
Townships
Xihe Township	西河乡	Xīhé Xiāng	ᠰᠢ ᠾᠧ ᠰᠢᠶᠠᠩ	Ший ге шиян	150223216
Bag Onggon Township (Xiaowengong Township)	小文公乡	Xiǎowéngōng Xiāng	ᠪᠠᠭ᠎ᠠ ᠣᠩᠭᠣᠨ ᠰᠢᠶᠠᠩ	Бага онгон шиян	150223217

== Climate ==
Darhan Banner has a monsoon-influenced, continental semi-arid climate (Köppen BSk), barely avoiding arid designation, with very cold and dry winters, hot, somewhat humid summers, and strong winds, especially in spring. The monthly 24-hour average temperature ranges from −14.2 °C (6.4 °F) in January to 21.7 °C (71.1 °F) in July, with the annual mean at 4.70 °C (40.5 °F). The annual precipitation is 252 mm (9.9 in), with more than half of it falling in July and August alone. There are 3,164 hours of bright sunshine annually, with each of the winter months having over 70% of the possible total, and this percentage falling to 58 in July.

Climate data for Darhan Banner, elevation 1,377 m (4,518 ft), (1991–2020 normals, extremes 1951–2010)
Month	Jan	Feb	Mar	Apr	May	Jun	Jul	Aug	Sep	Oct	Nov	Dec	Year
Record high °C (°F)	8.2 (46.8)	16.8 (62.2)	21.7 (71.1)	30.2 (86.4)	33.7 (92.7)	37.5 (99.5)	38.1 (100.6)	34.5 (94.1)	33.4 (92.1)	25.4 (77.7)	17.5 (63.5)	10.7 (51.3)	38.1 (100.6)
Mean daily maximum °C (°F)	−6.1 (21.0)	−1.3 (29.7)	6.1 (43.0)	14.7 (58.5)	21.4 (70.5)	26.4 (79.5)	28.7 (83.7)	26.5 (79.7)	20.9 (69.6)	12.9 (55.2)	3.1 (37.6)	−4.5 (23.9)	12.4 (54.3)
Daily mean °C (°F)	−14.0 (6.8)	−9.5 (14.9)	−1.6 (29.1)	7.2 (45.0)	14.3 (57.7)	19.7 (67.5)	22.1 (71.8)	19.9 (67.8)	13.8 (56.8)	5.4 (41.7)	−4.0 (24.8)	−11.6 (11.1)	5.1 (41.3)
Mean daily minimum °C (°F)	−20.1 (−4.2)	−15.8 (3.6)	−8.1 (17.4)	0.1 (32.2)	7.0 (44.6)	12.9 (55.2)	16.0 (60.8)	13.9 (57.0)	7.6 (45.7)	−0.4 (31.3)	−9.1 (15.6)	−16.9 (1.6)	−1.1 (30.1)
Record low °C (°F)	−39.4 (−38.9)	−33.8 (−28.8)	−29.9 (−21.8)	−15.4 (4.3)	−8.9 (16.0)	0.2 (32.4)	4.0 (39.2)	2.1 (35.8)	−5.8 (21.6)	−14.5 (5.9)	−29.6 (−21.3)	−35.7 (−32.3)	−39.4 (−38.9)
Average precipitation mm (inches)	2.2 (0.09)	3.4 (0.13)	6.7 (0.26)	7.1 (0.28)	22.3 (0.88)	38.7 (1.52)	67.8 (2.67)	61.0 (2.40)	36.1 (1.42)	11.7 (0.46)	5.0 (0.20)	2.5 (0.10)	264.5 (10.41)
Average precipitation days (≥ 0.1 mm)	3.3	3.3	4.2	3.5	5.3	9.0	11.6	9.9	7.0	3.8	3.7	3.4	68
Average snowy days	4.9	4.9	4.9	2.0	0.5	0	0	0	0.2	1.8	4.8	5.3	29.3
Average relative humidity (%)	57	49	39	31	33	41	50	54	51	49	53	56	47
Mean monthly sunshine hours	219.9	220.6	257.4	268.9	286.0	247.6	255.0	260.1	239.8	244.3	208.7	202.2	2,910.5
Percentage possible sunshine	74	73	69	67	63	55	56	61	65	72	72	71	67
Source: China Meteorological Administration

Climate data for Xilamurenzhen Town, Darhan Banner, elevation 1,602 m (5,256 ft), (1991–2020 normals)
Month	Jan	Feb	Mar	Apr	May	Jun	Jul	Aug	Sep	Oct	Nov	Dec	Year
Mean daily maximum °C (°F)	−7.1 (19.2)	−2.7 (27.1)	4.2 (39.6)	12.6 (54.7)	19.1 (66.4)	24.0 (75.2)	26.1 (79.0)	24.1 (75.4)	18.8 (65.8)	11.2 (52.2)	2.0 (35.6)	−5.5 (22.1)	10.6 (51.0)
Daily mean °C (°F)	−15.4 (4.3)	−11.0 (12.2)	−3.5 (25.7)	5.3 (41.5)	12.2 (54.0)	17.4 (63.3)	19.8 (67.6)	17.6 (63.7)	11.8 (53.2)	3.7 (38.7)	−5.4 (22.3)	−13.0 (8.6)	3.3 (37.9)
Mean daily minimum °C (°F)	−21.6 (−6.9)	−17.3 (0.9)	−10.0 (14.0)	−2.0 (28.4)	4.6 (40.3)	10.3 (50.5)	13.5 (56.3)	11.5 (52.7)	5.6 (42.1)	−2.2 (28.0)	−10.9 (12.4)	−18.7 (−1.7)	−3.1 (26.4)
Average precipitation mm (inches)	2.3 (0.09)	2.6 (0.10)	6.2 (0.24)	10.7 (0.42)	25.9 (1.02)	44.0 (1.73)	76.8 (3.02)	67.9 (2.67)	37.6 (1.48)	15.2 (0.60)	6.4 (0.25)	2.4 (0.09)	298 (11.71)
Average precipitation days (≥ 0.1 mm)	3.7	3.4	4.8	4.1	7.5	11.3	12.7	11.2	8.9	4.6	4.7	3.9	80.8
Average snowy days	4.8	5.1	5.7	2.8	0.8	0	0	0	0.2	2.3	5.6	6.2	33.5
Average relative humidity (%)	66	58	48	39	40	48	59	62	59	57	61	64	55
Mean monthly sunshine hours	243.6	237.1	281.5	295.9	317.0	287.7	283.1	283.2	261.1	264.6	230.1	228.7	3,213.6
Percentage possible sunshine	82	78	75	74	70	64	62	67	71	78	79	80	73
Source: China Meteorological Administration

Climate data for Mandula Town, Darhan Banner, elevation 1,225 m (4,019 ft), (1991–2020 normals)
Month	Jan	Feb	Mar	Apr	May	Jun	Jul	Aug	Sep	Oct	Nov	Dec	Year
Mean daily maximum °C (°F)	−6.7 (19.9)	−1.5 (29.3)	6.3 (43.3)	15.2 (59.4)	22.2 (72.0)	27.4 (81.3)	29.9 (85.8)	27.6 (81.7)	21.8 (71.2)	13.2 (55.8)	2.9 (37.2)	−5.1 (22.8)	12.8 (55.0)
Daily mean °C (°F)	−13.3 (8.1)	−8.8 (16.2)	−1.1 (30.0)	8.0 (46.4)	15.3 (59.5)	21.0 (69.8)	23.7 (74.7)	21.5 (70.7)	15.1 (59.2)	6.2 (43.2)	−3.7 (25.3)	−11.2 (11.8)	6.1 (42.9)
Mean daily minimum °C (°F)	−18.4 (−1.1)	−14.4 (6.1)	−7.3 (18.9)	1.3 (34.3)	8.3 (46.9)	14.5 (58.1)	17.7 (63.9)	15.6 (60.1)	9.1 (48.4)	0.5 (32.9)	−8.6 (16.5)	−16.0 (3.2)	0.2 (32.3)
Average precipitation mm (inches)	1.6 (0.06)	2.7 (0.11)	4.3 (0.17)	5.6 (0.22)	15.7 (0.62)	27.5 (1.08)	38.6 (1.52)	39.2 (1.54)	21.3 (0.84)	7.4 (0.29)	3.6 (0.14)	2.3 (0.09)	169.8 (6.68)
Average precipitation days (≥ 0.1 mm)	2.5	2.5	3.2	2.6	4.4	7.6	8.7	8.6	5.4	2.5	3.1	3.3	54.4
Average snowy days	4.0	3.8	4.0	1.8	0.5	0	0	0	0.1	1.7	4.6	5.1	25.6
Average relative humidity (%)	56	45	35	27	29	36	43	46	43	42	49	55	42
Mean monthly sunshine hours	224.7	229.7	273.2	286.4	310.7	297.1	297.4	291.4	269.8	260.1	217.6	208.4	3,166.5
Percentage possible sunshine	76	76	73	71	68	65	65	69	73	77	75	74	72
Source: China Meteorological Administration
