= Bailingmiao =

Coordinates: 41°42′11″N 110°26′06″E

- Traditional Chinese: 百靈廟
- Simplified Chinese: 百灵庙
- Literal meaning: Hundred Spirits Temple
Transcriptions
Standard Mandarin
- Hanyu Pinyin: Bǎilíngmiào

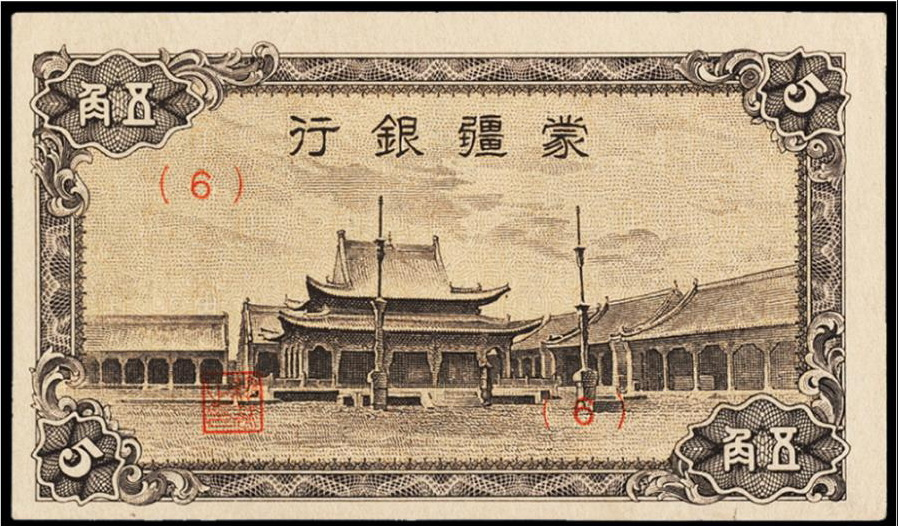
The basis of the town's name, Bailing Temple, depicted on a wartime Mengjiang banknote

Bailingmiao (also known as Pailingmiao, Bat Khaalga, or Bathahalak) is a small settlement of 705 people in Inner Mongolia, China. It is located in the Darhan Muminggan United Banner, about 110 kilometres (68 mi) northeast of Baotou. From 1934 to 1936 it served as the seat of the Mongol Local Autonomy Political Affairs Committee. In November 1936 it was the site of a battle in the Suiyuan Campaign. The town has recently been studied as a location for possible wind farms.

The town has two primary schools: Primary School #1 (established in 1958) and Primary School #2.
