= North Chahar incident =

The North Chahar incident (Chinese: 張北事件) between Japan and China in June 1935, resulted in an agreement that demilitarized Chahar province.

In June 1935, four Japanese soldiers entered the Zhangbei District of Chahar province, north of the Great Wall, on a journey to Kalgan (Zhangjiakou) and Beiping. They were detained because they did not have required travel permits from the Chahar Provincial Government. The soldiers were then taken to the headquarters of the local Chinese Divisional Commander, who asked the general in command of the Chinese 29th Army for instructions. The Army commander ordered their release, allowing them to continue on their journey, but with the warning that appropriate permits must be obtained in future.

A complaint was made by the Japanese Consul at Kalgan, to General Qin Dechun, Deputy Commander of the Chinese 29th Army, that the Chinese Guards had searched the Japanese soldiers, pointed rifles at them, and had detained them some hours at Divisional Headquarters, thus insulting the Japanese Army. Soon after, the Consul passed along the matter to the Kwantung Army saying it was very grave and was beyond his power to resolve. General Mimami Commander-in-Chief of the Kwantung Army appointed Kenji Doihara to negotiate with General Qin. The resulting negotiations resulted in the Qin-Doihara Agreement.

== See also ==
- Second Sino-Japanese War
  - Actions in Inner Mongolia (1933-36)

== Source ==
- International Military Tribunal for the Far East, Chapter 5: Japanese Aggression Against China
