= Jasagh =

Mongolian noble title

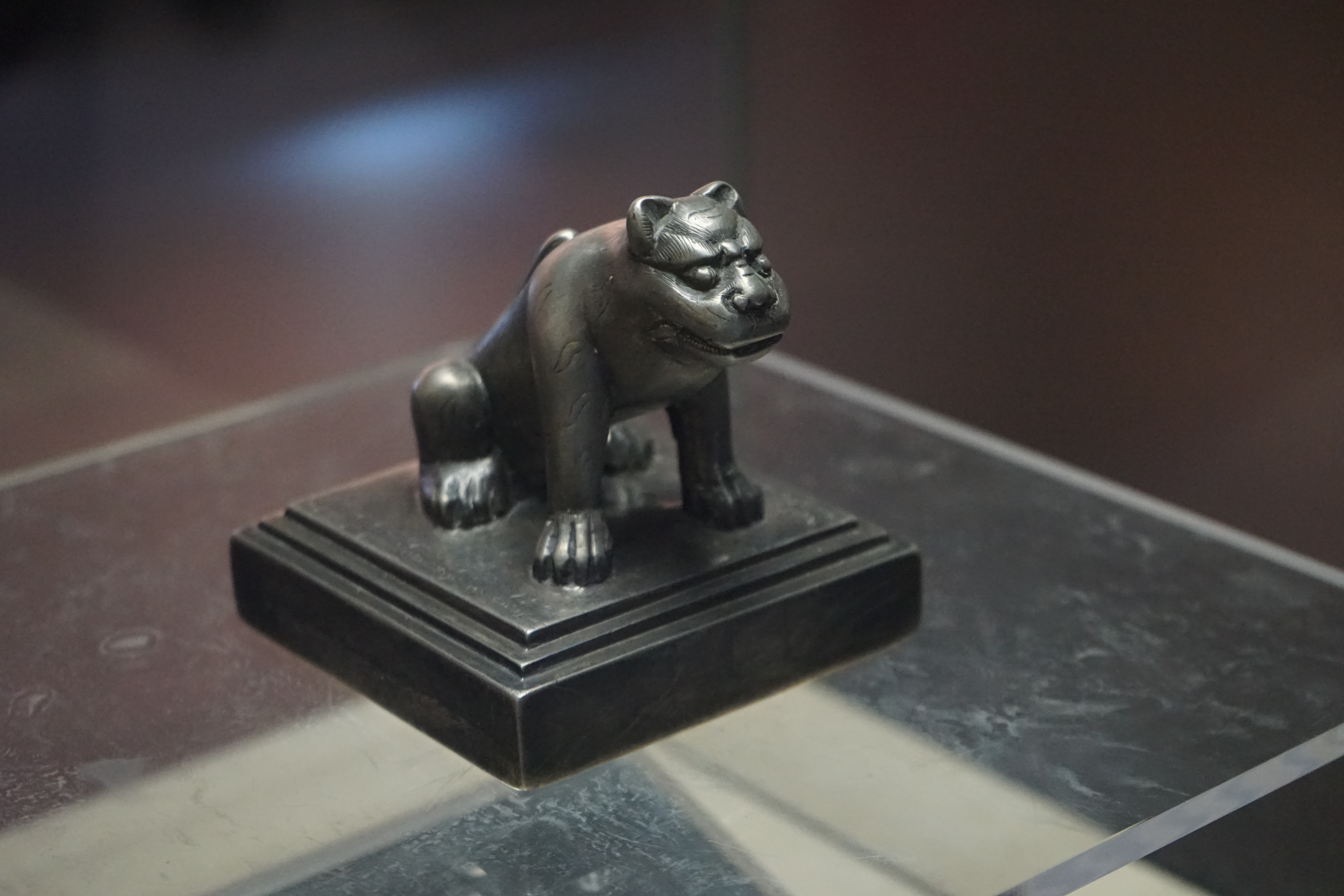
A jasagh seal

A jasagh (Mongolian: ᠵᠠᠰᠠᠭ засаг; Manchu: ᠵᠠᠰᠠᡴ jasak; Chinese: 札薩克; lit. 'power,' 'authority'), or jasagh noyan (Mongolian: засаг ноён), was the head of a Mongol banner or khoshun during the Qing dynasty and the Bogd Khanate. The position was held by hereditary succession by certain Mongol princes or Taijis, most of whom were descendants of Genghis Khan. The princes who did not serve as Jasagh were known as sula (сул; 閒散 - lit. empty, idle) or hohi taiji (хохь тайж).

== Ranks of jasaghs ==
During Qing dynasty and Bogd Khaganate, the Mongolian prince had six numbered ranks. The titles were the same as those used by members of the Manchu nobility:

- Chin Wang (Чин ван, 親王) - Prince of the First Rank
- Giyün Wang (Жүн ван, 郡王) - Prince of the Second Rank
- Beile (Бэйл, 貝勒) - Prince of the Third Rank
- Beis (Бэйс, 貝子) - Prince of the Fourth Rank
- Tushiye Gong (Түшээ гүн, 鎭國公) - Prince of the Fifth Rank
- Tusalagchi Gong (Туслагч гүн, 輔國公) - Prince of the Sixth Rank

The Mongol noble who served as Jasagh but did not hold the prince or khan titles were called noyan taiji (ноён тайж).

== List of jasaghs ==
Most of jasaghs were under prince, first-rank taiji (Terigun Zereg-un Taiji) or first-rank tabunang (Terigun Zereg-un Tabunang) title. Sula princes are not list here.

=== Mongols of the Outer Vassals ===
==== Inner Jasagh Mongolia ====
===== Jirem =====
The Jirem chuulgan (Жиримийн чуулган, 哲里木盟) consisted of four tribes: Khorchin, Jalaids, Eastern Dörbet and Gorlos.

Banner	Established	First ruler	Title	Notes
Horqin Right Middle Banner (Tüsheet Banner)	1626	Ooba	Jasagh, "Tüsheet" Chin Wang	
Horqin Left Middle Banner (Darhan Banner)	1636	Manjusiri	Jasagh, "Darhan" Chin Wang	
Horqin Right Front Banner (Zasagtu Banner)	1636	Bodači	Jasagh, "Zasagtu" Giyün Wang	
Horqin Left Front Banner (Bingtu Banner)	1636	Qongɣor	Jasagh, "Bingtu" Giyün Wang	
Horqin Left Rear Banner (Bodlogotoi Banner)	1636	Dungqur	Jasagh, "Bodlogotoi" Chin Wang	
Horqin Right Rear Banner	1636	Lamasiki	Jasagh, Tushiye Gong	
Jalaid Banner	1648	Mongqon	Jasagh, Beile	
Dorbod Banner	1636	Sereng	Jasagh, Beis	
Gorlos Front Banner	1648	Bomba	Jasagh, Tushiye Gong	
Gorlos Rear Banner	1636	Gümü	Jasagh, Tusalagchi Gong	

===== Josutu =====
The Josutu chuulgan (Зостын чуулган, 卓索圖盟) consisted of two tribes: Kharchin and Tumed.

Banner	Established	First ruler	Title	Notes
Harqin Right Wing Banner	1635	Gürüskib	Jasagh, "Düreng" Chin Wang	
Harqin Left Wing Banner	1635	Sereng	Jasagh, Beis	
Harqin Middle Banner	1635	Gerel	Jasagh, First Rank Tabunang	
Tumed Left Wing Banner	1635	Šamba	Jasagh, "Darhan" Beile	
Tumed Right Wing Banner	1648	Gümü	Jasagh, Beis	

===== Ju Ud =====
The Ju Ud chuulgan (Зуу Удын чуулган, 昭烏達盟) consisted of eight tribes: Aohans, Naimans, Baarins, Jaruud, Ar Horqin, Onnigud, Khishigten and Khalkha Left Wing.

Banner	Established	First ruler	Title	Notes
Aohan Banner (as Aohan Left Banner after 1910)	1636	Bandi	Jasagh, Giyün Wang	Aohan Banner was divided into Aohan Left Banner and Aohan Right Banner in 1910.
Aohan Right Banner	1648	Sonom Düreng	Jasagh, Giyün Wang	Sonom Düreng was granted the title Giyün Wang posthumously. His son Majiɣ was de facto the first ruler. The princes did not serve as Jasagh until the establishment of the Aohan Right Banner in 1910.
Naiman Banner	1636	Günčoɣ	Jasagh, "Darhan" Giyün Wang	
Bairin Right Wing Banner	1648	Sebten	Jasagh, Giyün Wang (honorary Chin Wang ranked)	
Bairin Left Wing Banner	1648	Manjusiri	Jasagh, Beis	
Jarud Left Wing Banner	1648	Neyiči	Jasagh, Beile	Neyiči was granted the title Beile posthumously. His son Šangɣijab was de facto the first ruler.
Jarud Right Wing Banner	1648	Seben	Jasagh, "Darhan" Beile	Seben was granted the title Darhan Beile posthumously. His son Sangɣar was de facto the first ruler.
Ar Horqin Banner	1644	Mojang	Jasagh, Beile	
Ongniud Left Wing Banner	1636	Sün Düreng	Jasagh, "Düreng" Giyün Wang	
Ongniud Right Wing Banner	1636	Düng Dayičing	Jasagh, "Darhan Dayičing" Beile	
Hexigten Banner	1652	Sonom	Jasagh, First Rank Taiji	
Khalkha Left Wing Banner	1664	Gümbu Ilden	Jasagh, Beile	

===== Xilingol =====
The Xilingol chuulgan (Шилийн голын чуулган, 錫林郭勒盟) consisted of five tribes: Üzemchin, Khuuchid, Sunud, Abaga and Abaganar.

Banner	Established	First ruler	Title	Notes
Ujimqin Right Wing Banner	1641	Dorji	Jasagh, "Setsen" Chin Wang	
Ujimqin Left Wing Banner	1646	Sereng	Jasagh, "Erdeni" Beile	
Khuuchid Left Wing Banner	1646	Bolod	Jasagh, "Erdeni" Giyün Wang	
Khuuchid Right Wing Banner	1653	Garm-a Sevang	Jasagh, Giyün Wang	
Sonid Left Wing Banner	1641	Tanggis	Jasagh, Giyün Wang	
Sonid Right Wing Banner	1642	Seusa	Jasagh, "Düreng" Giyün Wang	
Abag Right Wing Banner	1641	Dorji	Jasagh, "Jorigtü" Giyün Wang	
Abag Left Wing Banner	1651	Düsker	Jasagh, Giyün Wang	
Abaganar Right Wing Banner	1667	Sereng Mergen	Jasagh, Beile	
Abaganar Left Wing Banner	1665	Düng Israb	Jasagh, Beis	

===== Ulanqhab =====
The Ulanqhab chuulgan (Улаанцавын чуулган, 烏蘭察布盟) consisted of four tribes: Dorbod (Siziwang), Muumyangan, Urad and Khalkha Right Wing.

Banner	Established	First ruler	Title	Notes
Dorbod Banner	1636	Ombu	Jasagh, "Jorigtü" Giyün Wang	
Muminggan Banner	1664	Sengge	Jasagh, First Rank Taiji	
Urad Rear Wing Banner	1648	Tuba	Jasagh, Tushiye Gong	
Urad Front Wing Banner	1648	Üban	Jasagh, Tushiye Gong	
Urad Middle Banner	1648	Baɣbaqai	Jasagh, Tusalagchi Gong	
Khalkha Right Wing Banner	1653	Bontar	Jasagh, "Darhan" Beile	

===== Ih Ju =====
The Ih Ju chuulgan (Их Зуугийн чуулган, 伊克昭盟) consisted of one tribe: Ordos.

Banner	Established	First ruler	Title	Notes
Ordos Left Wing Middle Banner (Giyün Wang Banner)	1649	Erinčen	Jasagh, Giyün Wang	
Ordos Right Wing Middle Banner (Otog Banner)	1650	Šandan	Jasagh, Beile	
Ordos Right Wing Rear Banner (Hanggin Banner)	1649	J̌amsu the Younger (Baɣ-a J̌amsu)	Jasagh, Beis	
Ordos Left Wing Rear Banner (Dalad Banner)	1649	Šaɣja	Jasagh, Beis	
Ordos Right Wing Front Banner (Uxin Banner)	1649	Erinčin	Jasagh, Beis	
Ordos Left Wing Front Banner (Jungar Banner)	1649	Sereng	Jasagh, Beis	
Ordos Right Wing Front Bottom Banner (Jasagh Banner)	1731	Dingdzaraši	Jasagh, First Rank Taiji	

==== Outer Jasagh Mongolia ====
===== Khan Uul (Tüsheet Khan) =====
The Khan Uulyn chuulgan (Хан уулын чуулган) consisted of one tribe: Tüsheet Khan.

Banner	Established	First ruler	Title	Notes
Tüsheet Khan Banner	1691	Čaqundorji	"Tüsheet" Khan	
Tüsheet Khan Left Wing Middle Banner (Mergen zasg Banner)	1691	Gürüsiki	Jasagh, Giyün Wang	
Tüsheet Khan Middle Banner (Darkhan zasg Banner)	1691	Kaldandorji	Jasagh, Beis	
Tüsheet Khan Right Wing Left Banner (Erdene daiching zasg Banner)	1691	Čemčuɣnamjal	Jasagh, Chin Wang	
Tüsheet Khan Middle Right Banner (Zorigt zasg Banner)	1691	Sidisiri	Jasagh, Chin Wang	
Tüsheet Khan Right Wing Left Bottom Banner (Baatar zasg Banner)	1691	Sibdüi Qatan Batur	Jasagh, First Rank Taiji	
Tüsheet Khan Left Wing Left Middle Bottom Banner (Setsen zasg Banner)	1711	Čerimbal	Jasagh, Tusalagchi Gong	
Tüsheet Khan Right Wing Right Bottom Banner (Ilden zasg Banner)	1731	Baqai	Jasagh, Tusalagchi Gong	
Tüsheet Khan Middle Left Banner (Üizen zasg Banner)	1753	Sandaɣdorji	Jasagh, First Rank Taiji (honorary Gong ranked)	
Tüsheet Khan Left Wing Rear Banner (Tüsheet zasg Banner)	1693	Litar	Jasagh, Tushiye Gong	
Tüsheet Khan Left Wing Front Banner (Bishrelt zasg Banner)	1691	Balang	Jasagh, Tushiye Gong	
Tüsheet Khan Right Wing Right Banner (Dalai zasg Banner)	1691	Banjurdorji	Jasagh, Tusalagchi Gong	
Tüsheet Khan Middle Right Bottom Banner (Süjigt zasg Banner)	1719	Čempildorji	Jasagh, Tusalagchi Gong	
Tüsheet Khan Left Wing Bottom Banner (Achit zasg Banner)	1691	Čering	Jasagh, First Rank Taiji	
Tüsheet Khan Middle Left Wing Bottom Banner (Erdene zasg Banner)	1694	Čerinjab	Jasagh, First Rank Taiji	
Tüsheet Khan Right Wing Right Bottom Side Banner (Akhai zasg Banner)	1696	Čingdorji	Jasagh, First Rank Taiji	
Tüsheet Khan Left Wing Right Side Banner (Daichin zasg Banner)	1697	Kayimčoɣ	Jasagh, First Rank Taiji	
Tüsheet Khan Middle Side Banner (Tsogtoi zasg Banner)	1719	Čenggünjab	Jasagh, First Rank Taiji	
Tüsheet Khan Right Wing Left Rear Banner (Jonon zasg Banner)	1730	Püsuɣrabtan	Jasagh, First Rank Taiji	
Tüsheet Khan Left Wing Middle Left Banner (Eyetei zasg Banner)	1732	Sundub	Jasagh, First Rank Taiji	

===== Kherlen Bars Khotod (Sechen Khan) =====
The Kherlen Bars Khotod chuulgan (Хэрлэн Барс хотод чуулган) consisted of one tribe: Sechen Khan.

Banner	Established	First ruler	Title	Notes
Sechen Khan Banner	1691	Ümekei	"Sechen" Khan	
Sechen Khan Left Middle Banner (Darkhan zasg Banner)	1691	Namjal	Jasagh, Chin Wang	
Sechen Khan Middle Right Banner (Ilden zasg Banner)	1691	Püngsuɣ	Jasagh, Giyün Wang	
Sechen Khan Right Wing Middle Banner (Setsen zasg Banner)	1691	Čebten	Jasagh, Beile	
Sechen Khan Middle Left Banner (Erdeni Dalai zasg Banner)	1691	Bodajab	Jasagh, Beile	
Sechen Khan Middle Bottom Banner (Bishrelt zasg Banner)	1691	Dari	Jasagh, Beis	
Sechen Khan Middle Rear Banner (Jonon zasg Banner)	1691	Čebten	Jasagh, Beis	
Sechen Khan Middle Front Banner (Chin achit zasg Banner)	1691	Ananda	Jasagh, Beis	
Sechen Khan Left Wing Front Banner (Erkhemseg zasg Banner)	1691	Čebten	Jasagh, Tushiye Gong	
Sechen Khan Right Wing Middle Right Banner (Akhai zasg Banner)	1711	Čeringvangbu	Jasagh, Tusalagchi Gong	
Sechen Khan Left Wing Rear Banner (Yost zasg Banner)	1691	Čeringdasi	Jasagh, First Rank Taiji	
Sechen Khan Right Wing Middle Front Banner (Zorigt zasg Banner)	1754	Čeringdoyod	Jasagh, First Rank Taiji	
Sechen Khan Left Wing Rear Bottom Banner (Üizen zasg Banner)	1711	Dorjidaši	Jasagh, First Rank Taiji (honorary Gong ranked)	
Sechen Khan Right Wing Rear Banner (Khurts zasg Banner)	1691	Gürüjab	Jasagh, First Rank Taiji	
Sechen Khan Right Wing Front Banner (Mergen zasg Banner)	1691	Serengdasi	Jasagh, First Rank Taiji	
Sechen Khan Middle Left Front Banner (Saruul zasg Banner)	1697	Günčoɣ	Jasagh, First Rank Taiji	
Sechen Khan Middle Bottom Side Banner (Daichin zasg Banner)	1695	Taulai	Jasagh, First Rank Taiji	
Sechen Khan Middle Right Rear Banner (Dalai darkhan zasg Banner)	1697	Lobdzang	Jasagh, First Rank Taiji	
Sechen Khan Left Wing Right Banner (Süjigt zasg Banner)	1701	Čoyijamsu	Jasagh, First Rank Taiji	
Sechen Khan Left Wing Left Banner (Erdene zasg Banner)	1696	Erdeni	Jasagh, First Rank Taiji	
Sechen Khan Right Wing Left Banner (Sergelen zasg Banner)	1701	Gendün	Jasagh, First Rank Taiji	
Sechen Khan Right Wing Middle Left Banner (Baatar zasg Banner)	1713	Čoyinjur	Jasagh, First Rank Taiji	
Sechen Khan Middle Bottom Right Banner (Erkh zasg Banner)	1735	Wangjaljab	Jasagh, First Rank Taiji	

===== Binderiyaa Nuur (Zasagt Khan) =====
The Zag Golyn Ekh Binderiyaa Nuuryn chuulgan (Заг голын эх Биндэръяа нуурын чуулган) consisted of one tribe: Zasagt Khan.

Banner	Established	First ruler	Title	Notes
Zasagt Khan Middle Banner	1691	Tsëvangjab	"Zasagt" Khan	Zasagt Khan Middle Banner was merged into the Zasagt Khan Right Wing Left Banner in 1732
Zasagt Khan Right Wing Left Banner (Zasagt Khan Banner)	1691	Püsuɣrabtan	Jasagh, Giyün Wang	Since 1732 the ruler of Zasagt Khan Right Wing Left Banner concurrently held the title of Zasagt Khan.
Zasagt Khan Middle Left Wing Left Banner (Erdene düüregch zasg Banner)	1691	Gendün	Jasagh, Beile (honorary Giyün Wang ranked)	
Zasagt Khan Left Wing Right Banner (Erdene zasg Banner)	1691	Jodba	Jasagh, Tushiye Gong	
Zasagt Khan Right Wing Right Banner (Ilden zasg Banner)	1691	Böbei	Jasagh, Tushiye Gong	
Zasagt Khan Left Wing Rear Banner (Jonon zasg Banner)	1691	Sonom Isijab	Jasagh, Tusalagchi Gong	
Zasagt Khan Left Wing Front Banner (Chin achit zasg Banner)	1691	Günjan	Jasagh, Tusalagchi Gong	
Zasagt Khan Middle Right Wing Bottom Banner (Daichin zasg Banner)	1714	Tongmoɣ	Jasagh, Tusalagchi Gong	
Zasagt Khan Right Wing Right Bottom Banner (Dalai zasg Banner)	1724	Šaɣja	Jasagh, Tusalagchi Gong	
Zasagt Khan Middle Left Wing Right Banner (Mergen zasg Banner)	1756	Čibaɣjab	Jasagh, Tusalagchi Gong	Čibaɣjab was granted the title Tusalagchi Gong posthumously. His son Batujirɣal was de facto the first ruler.
Zasagt Khan Left Wing Middle Banner (Üizen zasg Banner)	1728	Rabtan	Jasagh, Tushiye Gong	
Zasagt Khan Right Wing Rear Banner (Baatar zasg Banner)	1691	Erdeni Gümbu	Jasagh, First Rank Taiji	
Zasagt Khan Right Wing Front Banner (Yost zasg Banner)	1691	Urjan	Jasagh, First Rank Taiji	
Zasagt Khan Right Wing Rear Bottom Banner (Bishrelt zasg Banner)	1697	Qamar Dayičing	Jasagh, First Rank Taiji	
Zasagt Khan Middle Right Wing Bottom Side Banner (Tsogtoi zasg Banner)	1709	Namarindzangbu	Jasagh, First Rank Taiji	
Zasagt Khan Left Wing Rear Bottom Banner (Zorigt zasg Banner)	1726	Idamjab	Jasagh, First Rank Taiji	
Zasagt Khan Middle Left Wing Bottom Banner (Akhai zasg Banner)	1757	Dasipongsuɣ	Jasagh, First Rank Taiji	
Zasagt Khan Middle Right Wing Left Banner (Darkhan zasg Banner)	1755	Pürbüčering	Jasagh, First Rank Taiji	
Zasagt Khan Left Wing Left Banner (Setsen zasg Banner)	1691	Sereng Aqai	Jasagh, Beile	
Khoid Banner (Süjigt zasg Banner)	1755	Kaldandarja	Jasagh, Olot First Rank Taiji	

===== Tsetserleg (Sain Noyon Khan) =====
The Tsetserlegiin chuulgan (Цэцэрлэгийн чуулган) consisted of one tribe: Sain Noyon Khan.

Banner	Established	First ruler	Title	Notes
Sain Noyon Banner (Sain Noyon Khan Banner)	1691	Šamba	"Sain Noyon" khan	The princes were granted the title of Chin Wang during Qing dynasty. The princes were promoted to khan after the Mongolian Revolution of 1911.
Sain Noyon Middle Left Bottom Banner (Setsen zasg Banner)	1721	Tsëring	Jasagh, Chin Wang	
Sain Noyon Middle Right Banner (Daichin zasg Banner)	1751	Čebtenjab	Jasagh, Giyün Wang	
Sain Noyon Middle Left Banner (Dalai zasg Banner)	1691	Gümbu	Jasagh, Beile	
Sain Noyon Right Wing Right Rear Banner (Erdene zasg Banner)	1691	Todo Erdeni	Jasagh, Giyün Wang	
Sain Noyon Middle Front Banner (Ilden zasg Banner)	1691	Südai Ilden	Jasagh, Beile	
Sain Noyon Left Wing Left Banner (Jonon zasg Banner)	1692	Wangšuɣ	Jasagh, Tusalagchi Gong	
Sain Noyon Right Wing Front Banner (Saruul zasg Banner)	1691	Ayusi	Jasagh, Tusalagchi Gong	
Sain Noyon Right Wing Middle Left Banner (Üizen zasg Banner)	1707	Čeringdasi	Jasagh, Tusalagchi Gong	
Sain Noyon Middle Rear Banner (Khoshuuch mergen zasg Banner)	1712	Norbujab	Jasagh, Tusalagchi Gong	
Sain Noyon Left Wing Middle Banner (Erkh zasg Banner)	1754	Čivangdorji	Jasagh, First Rank Taiji (honorary Gong ranked)	
Sain Noyon Middle Bottom Banner (Itgemjit zasg Banner)	1692	Ariy-a	Jasagh, Tushiye Gong	
Sain Noyon Right Wing Bottom Banner (Tsogtoi zasg Banner)	1691	Tuba	Jasagh, Tushiye Gong	
Sain Noyon Left Wing Right Banner (Yost zasg Banner)	1691	Danjin Erdeni	Jasagh, First Rank Taiji	
Sain Noyon Right Wing Rear Banner (Mergen zasg Banner)	1692	Samjid	Jasagh, First Rank Taiji	
Sain Noyon Middle Right Wing Bottom Banner (Achit zasg Banner)	1696	Idam	Jasagh, First Rank Taiji	
Sain Noyon Left Wing Left Bottom Banner (Tüsheet zasg Banner)	1696	Namjal	Jasagh, First Rank Taiji	
Sain Noyon Right Wing Middle Right Banner (Zorigt zasg Banner)	1696	Šarü Ildüči	Jasagh, First Rank Taiji	
Sain Noyon Right Wing Left Bottom Banner (Akhai zasg Banner)	1697	Sudani	Jasagh, First Rank Taiji	
Sain Noyon Middle Rear Bottom Banner (Eyetei zasg Banner)	1712	Jinamida	Jasagh, First Rank Taiji	
Sain Noyon Right Wing Middle Bottom Banner (Darkhan zasg Banner)	1712	Dorji	Jasagh, First Rank Taiji	
Sain Noyon Right Bottom Banner (Baatar zasg Banner)	1738	Emegen	Jasagh, First Rank Taiji	
Olot Front Banner (Bishrelt zasg Banner)	1702	Arabtan	Jasagh, Beis	
Olot Banner (Süjigt zasg Banner)	1697	Danjil-a	Jasagh, Beis	

===== Qing dynasty governed directly jasagh =====
Governed directly by Lifan Yuan during Qing dynasty.

Banner	Established	First ruler	Title	Notes
Alxan Olot Banner	1697	Qoruli	Jasagh, Chin Wang	Alxan Olot Mongols. Governed directly by Lifan Yuan and commanded by Viceroy of Shaan-Gan.
Ejin Torghut Banner	1704	Arabjur	Jasagh, Beile	Torghut Mongols. Governed directly by Lifan Yuan and commanded by Viceroy of Shaan-Gan.
Khoshut West Top Banner	1701	Čaɣan Danjin	Jasagh, Giyün Wang	Qinghai Khoshut Mongols. Commanded by Minister of Xining Handling Affairs (Xining Amban).
Khoshut South Right Wing Middle Banner	1720	Arabtanjamsu	Jasagh, First Rank Taiji	Qinghai Khoshut Mongols. Commanded by Minister of Xining Handling Affairs (Xining Amban).
Khoshut South Left Wing Middle Banner	1731	Čaɣan Rabtan	Jasagh, First Rank Taiji	Qinghai Khoshut Mongols. Commanded by Minister of Xining Handling Affairs (Xining Amban).
Khoshut South Left Wing Side Banner	1746	Čeringdorji	Jasagh, First Rank Taiji	Qinghai Khoshut Mongols. Commanded by Minister of Xining Handling Affairs (Xining Amban). Abolished and merged into Khoshut Front Left Wing Top Banner in 1806.
Torghut South Front Banner	1731	Darja	Jasagh, First Rank Taiji	Qinghai Torghut. Commanded by Minister of Xining Handling Affairs (Xining Amban).
Shin Khoshut Banner	1771	Buyankhishig	Jasagh, First Rank Taiji	Bulgan Khoshut. Governed directly by Lifan Yuan and commanded by Khovd Ministerial Attache (Khovd Amban).

===== Qinghai Left Wing =====
Qinghai Left Wing (Хөхнуурын зүүн гарын чуулган, 青海左翼盟), established in 1823, consisted of ten banners of Khoshut and two banners of Torghut. These banners were governed directly by Lifan Yuan and commanded by Viceroy of Shaan-Gan before 1823.

Banner	Established	First ruler	Title	Notes
Khoshut West Front Banner	1703	Tsëvangrabtan	Jasagh, Giyün Wang	
Khoshut West Rear Banner	1716	Dayan	Jasagh, Beile	
Khoshut North Left Wing Banner	1711	Sonomdasi	Jasagh, Tusalagchi Gong	
Khoshut South Right Wing Bottom Banner	1711	Lobdzangdarja	Jasagh, First Rank Taiji	
Khoshut South Left Wing Rear Banner	1671	Kaldandasi	Jasagh, Tusalagchi Gong	
Khoshut South Right Wing Rear Banner	1723	Sonomdasi	Jasagh, First Rank Taiji	
Khoshut North Front Banner	1711	Čering	Jasagh, Tusalagchi Gong	
Khoshut North Right Bottom Banner	1725	Damarinsebten	Jasagh, First Rank Taiji	
Khoshut North Left Bottom Banner	1725	Isiduljab	Jasagh, First Rank Taiji	
Torghut West Banner	1725	Seterbom	Jasagh, First Rank Taiji	
Torghut South Rear Banner	1724	Danjung	Jasagh, First Rank Taiji	
Khoshut West Right Wing Middle Banner	1725	Čeringnamjal	Jasagh, First Rank Taiji	

===== Qinghai Right Wing =====
Qinghai Right Wing (Хөхнуурын баруун гарын чуулган, 青海右翼盟), established in 1823, consisted of Khoshut 7 banners, Choros, Khoid 1 banner, Torghut 1 banner and Khalkha 1 banner. These banners were governed directly by Lifan Yuan and commanded by Viceroy of Shaan-Gan before 1823.

Banner	Established	First ruler	Title	Notes
Choros South Right Wing Top Banner	1703	Sebtenjal	Jasagh, Beile	
Khoshut Front Left Wing Top Banner	1704	Gümbu	Jasagh, Giyün Wang	
Khoshut South Left Wing Bottom Banner	1698	Namjal	Jasagh, First Rank Taiji	
Khoshut North Right Wing Banner	1723	Čeringdondub	Jasagh, Beis	
Choros North Middle Banner	1716	Arabtan	Jasagh, Beis	
Khoid South Banner	1725	Güngge	Jasagh, Tusalagchi Gong	
Khoshut West Right Wing Front Banner	1725	Arabtan	Jasagh, First Rank Taiji	
Khoshut West Left Wing Rear Banner	1725	Qarɣas	Jasagh, First Rank Taiji	
Khoshut East Upper Banner	1725	Jab	Jasagh, First Rank Taiji	
Khoshut West Right Wing Rear Banner	1725	Sebten Bošoɣtu	Jasagh, First Rank Taiji	
Torghut South Middle Banner	1725	Sonomrabtandorji	Jasagh, First Rank Taiji	
Khalkha South Right Wing Banner	1765	Dasidondob	Jasagh, First Rank Taiji	

===== Sain Jayaatu Left Wing =====
Sain Jayaatu Left Wing (Сайн заяатын зүүн гарын чуулган) consisted of 11 banners of Dörbet Oirat and 1 banner of Khoid.

Banner	Established	First ruler	Title	Notes
Left Wing Dörbet Banner (Dörbet Dalai Khan Banner)	1754	Čering	"Tegüs Khüleg Dalai" khan	
Left Wing Dörbet Middle Banner (Erkh zasg Banner)	1754	Čering Möngke	Jasagh, Giyün Wang	
Left Wing Dörbet Middle Left Banner (Daichin zasg Banner)	1754	Sebten	Jasagh, Beile	
Left Wing Dörbet Middle Upper Banner (Jonon zasg Banner)	1754	Masibatu	Jasagh, Beis	
Left Wing Dörbet Middle Front Right Banner (Üizen zasg Banner)	1754	Banjur	Jasagh, Beis	
Left Wing Dörbet Middle Rear Banner (Setsen zasg Banner)	1754	Batumöngke	Jasagh, Tusalagchi Gong	
Left Wing Dörbet Middle Front Banner (Saruul zasg Banner)	1754	Kang	Jasagh, Tusalagchi Gong	
Left Wing Dörbet Middle Lower Banner (Erdene zasg Banner)	1754	Dasidondoɣ	Jasagh, First Rank Taiji	
Left Wing Dörbet Middle Rear Left Banner (Mergen zasg Banner)	1754	Güngsir-a	Jasagh, First Rank Taiji	
Left Wing Dörbet Middle Front Left Banner (Eyetei zasg Banner)	1754	Ebügen	Jasagh, First Rank Taiji	
Left Wing Dörbet Middle Rear Right Banner (Khurts zasg Banner)	1754	Bar	Jasagh, First Rank Taiji	
Left Wing Khoid Lower Rear Banner (Baatar zasg Banner)	1755	Damarin	Jasagh, First Rank Taiji	

===== Sain Jayaatu Right Wing =====
Sain Jayaatu Right Wing (Сайн заяатын баруун гарын чуулган) consisted of 3 banners of Dörbet Oirat and 1 banner of Khoid.

Banner	Established	First ruler	Title	Notes
Right Wing Dörbet Front Banner (Ünen zorigt khan Banner)	1754	Čering Ubaši	Jasagh, Chin Wang	
Right Wing Dörbet Front Right Banner (Bishrelt zasg Banner)	1754	Kangdorji	Jasagh, Beile	
Right Wing Dörbet Middle Front Banner (Yeröölt zasg Banner)	1754	Gendün	Jasagh, Tushiye Gong	
Right Wing Khoid Lower Front Banner (Süjigt zasg Banner)	1755	Lobdzang	Jasagh, First Rank Taiji	

===== Ünen süsegtiin dornod zam (Ili Eastern Route Old Torghut) =====
Ünen süsegtiin dornod zamyn chuulgan (Үнэн сүсэгтийн дорнод замын чуулган) also known as Ili Eastern Route (伊犁東路), consisted of 2 banners of Jargalang Torghut (a subgroup of Old Torghut).

Banner	Established	First ruler	Title	Notes
Ili Eastern Route Old Torghut Right Banner	1771	Bambar	Jasagh, "Bisireltu" Giyün Wang	
Ili Eastern Route Old Torghut Left Banner	1771	Čebten	Jasagh, "Itegel" Beis	

===== Ünen süsegtiin örnöd zam (Ili Western Route Old Torghut) =====
Ünen süsegtiin örnöd zamyn chuulgan (Үнэн сүсэгтийн өрнөд замын чуулган), also known as Ili Western Route (伊犁西路), consisted of 1 banner of Jing Torghut (a subgroup of Old Torghut).

Banner	Established	First ruler	Title	Notes
Ili Western Route Old Torghut Banner	1771	Momontu	Jasagh, "Jargalang" Beile	

===== Ünen süsegtiin ömnöd zam (Ili Southern Route Old Torghut) =====
Ünen süsegtiin ömnöd zamyn chuulgan (Үнэн сүсэгтийн өмнөд замын чуулган), also known as Ili Southern Route (伊犁南路), consisted of 4 banners of Yulduz Torghut (a subgroup of Old Torghut).

Banner	Established	First ruler	Title	Notes
Ili Southern Route Old Torghut Banner (Jorigtü Khan Banner)	1771	Ubaši	Jasagh, "Jorigtü" khan	
Ili Southern Route Old Torghut Middle Banner	1771	Emegen Ubaši	Jasagh, "Bayar" beis	
Ili Southern Route Old Torghut Right Banner	1771	Bayijiqu	Jasagh, Tusalagchi Gong	
Ili Southern Route Old Torghut Left Banner	1771	Ber Qašiq-a	Jasagh, First Rank Taiji	

===== Ünen süsegtiin umard zam (Ili Northern Route Old Torghut) =====
Ünen süsegtiin umard zamyn chuulgan (Үнэн сүсэгтийн умард замын чуулган), also known as Ili Northern Route (伊犁北路), consisted of 3 banners of Hoboksar Torghut (a subgroup of Old Torghut).

Banner	Established	First ruler	Title	Notes
Ili Northern Route Old Torghut Banner	1771	Tsëbegdorji	Jasagh, "Buyantu" Chin Wang	
Ili Northern Route Old Torghut Right Banner	1785	Günggečering	Jasagh, First Rank Taiji (honorary Gong ranked)	
Ili Northern Route Old Torghut Left Banner	1785	Aɣsaqal	Jasagh, Tusalagchi Gong	

===== Chin setgelt (New Torghut) =====
Chin setgeltiin chuulgan (Чин сэтгэлтийн чуулган) consisted of 2 banners of New Torghut.

Banner	Established	First ruler	Title	Notes
Jargalang Torghut Right Banner	1771	Šereng	Jasagh, "Biligtü" Giyün Wang	
Jargalang Torghut Left Banner	1771	Šar-a Köken	Jasagh, "Učaraltu" Beis	

===== Bat setgelt =====
Bat setgeltiin chuulgan (Бат сэтгэлтийн чуулган) consisted of 4 banners of Khoshut.

Banner	Established	First ruler	Title	Notes
Ili Middle Route Khoshut Banner	1771	Güngge	Jasagh, "Tüsheet" Beile	Abolished in 1797
Ili Middle Route Khoshut Middle Banner	1771	Yarimpil	Jasagh, "Amurlinggui" Beis	
Ili Middle Route Khoshut Right Banner	1771	Noqai	Jasagh, First Rank Taiji	
Ili Middle Route Khoshut Left Banner	1775	Bayarlaqu	Jasagh, First Rank Taiji	

=== Tibet ===
All of Tibetan Jasagh were granted honorably.

Established	First ruler	Title	Notes
1721	Polhané Sönam Topgyé	honorary Jasagh ranked, Giyün Wang	the prince Gyurme Namgyal revolted against Qing dynasty in 1749. The title was abolished in the next year.
1730	Gyurme Tseten (Jürmed Čebten)	honorary Jasagh ranked, Tusalagchi Gong	Gyurme Tseten was a son of Polhané Sönam Topgyé
1729	Sampho Sonam Dargye (Sonomdarja)	honorary Jasagh ranked, First Rank Taiji	Sonam Dargye was the father of 7th Dalai Lama
1728	Noyan Qosooči	honorary Jasagh ranked, First Rank Taiji	
1728	Dokhar Tsering Wanggyel (Čeringvangjal)	honorary Jasagh ranked, First Rank Taiji	Dokhar Tsering Wanggyel had served as Kalön from 1728 to 1736.

=== Altishahr ===
Altishahr (Turki Muslim major area in Xinjiang), two of six princes served as Jasagh.

Banner	Established	First ruler	Title	Notes
Kumul Khanate	1697	Abdullah Beg	"Kumul" Jasagh, Tarkhan of the First Rank	Muslim banner, held a title of Prince of the First Rank.
Turpan	1758	Emin Khoja	"Turpan" Jasagh, Giyün Wang	Muslim banner, held a title of Prince of the Second Rank.
