= Hsiao-ting Lin =

Taiwanese historian and political scientist

Hsiao-ting Lin (Chinese: 林孝庭; born 1971) is a Taiwanese sinologist at the Hoover Institution who studies Greater China, including ethnopolitics, the Kuomintang, and Taiwan–United States relations during the Cold War.

== Biography ==
Lin was born in Taipei, Taiwan, in 1971. After high school, he graduated from National Taiwan University with a B.A. in political science in 1994 and earned an M.A. in international law and diplomacy from National Chengchi University in 1997. He then completed doctoral studies in England at the University of Oxford, where he earned a Doctor of Philosophy (D.Phil.) in oriental studies in 2003 from St Cross College, Oxford. His doctoral dissertation was titled, "A reexamination of nationalist China's frontier agenda: A case study of Tibet, 1928-1949".

The 2017 Kingstone Award for Most Influential Book of the Year in Taiwan was awarded for his book "Accidental State: Chiang Kai-shek, the United States, and the Making of Taiwan" (Harvard University Press, 2016).

In April 2008, Lin was elected a Fellow of the Royal Asiatic Society of Great Britain and Ireland.

== Books ==
- Lin, Hsiao-ting. Tibet and Nationalist China's Frontier Intrigues and Ethnopolitics, 1928-49. .Vancouver UBC Press, 2014. ISBN 978-0-7748-5528-0
- Lin, Hsiao-ting. Modern China's Ethnic Frontiers: A Journey to the West. Routledge, 2013. ISBN 978-0-415-85540-2 OCLC 925300205
- Lin, Hsiao-ting. Accidental State: Chiang Kai-Shek, the United States, and the Making of Taiwan. Harvard University Press, 2016. ISBN 978-0-674-65981-0 OCLC 916684758
  - Also published in Chinese: 意外的國度 : 蔣介石, 美國, 與近代台灣的形塑 = Accidental state : Chiang Kai-shek, the United States, and the making of Taiwan /
- Yi wai de guo du : Jiang Jieshi, Meiguo, yu jin dai Taiwan de xing su. by 林孝庭, transl. Zhongxian Huang ISBN 978-986-94425-3-4
- Lin, Hsiao-ting. Tai hai leng zhan jie mi dang an = The cold war between Taiwan and China : the declassified documents. 2015.
