= Urad Mongols =

Tribe in Inner Mongolia

Territories of the Urad Mongols in 1911

The Urad (Mongolian: ᠤᠷᠠᠳ; simplified Chinese: 乌喇特部; traditional Chinese: 烏喇特部) is a Mongol tribe in Inner Mongolia, China. The name derives from the Mongolian language word "uran (means handy) + d", meaning "craftsman" or "artisan."

The Urad originated in Hulun Buir. In early Qing dynasty, the group relocated to the present-day location of Urad grassland in Bayannur, Inner Mongolia. They were organized into three banners, Urad Front Banner, Urad Middle Banner and Urad Rear Banner, in 1648.

In the 1700's, several natural disasters occurred which devastated Urad herds and agriculture. Over 300 people were sold off by desperate families in order to make money for scarce food. Several Urad monasteries are associated with the "Mergen Tradition", the only Mongolian Buddhist sect that does uses Mongolian instead of Tibetan.
