= Urad Rear Banner =

Urad Rear Banner 乌拉特后旗 · ᠤᠷᠠᠳ ᠤᠨ ᠬᠣᠶᠢᠲᠤ ᠬᠣᠰᠢᠭᠤ
- Banner
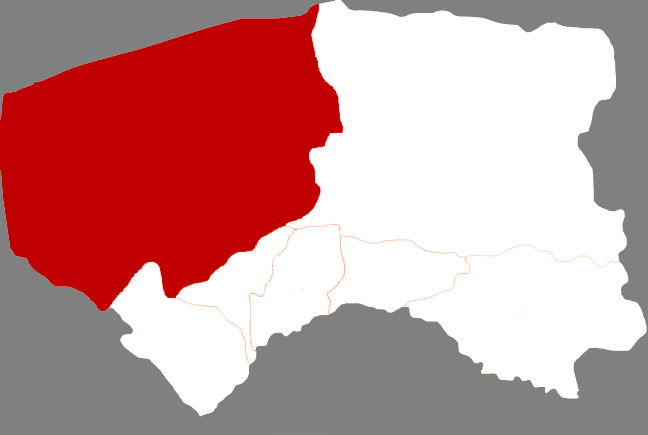
- Urat Rear Banner in Bayannur

- Bayannur in Inner Mongolia

- Location in Inner Mongolia Urad Rear (China)
- Coordinates: 41°04′53″N 107°04′17″E
- Country: China
- Autonomous region: Inner Mongolia
- Prefecture-level city: Bayannur
- Banner seat: Bayan Bulag

Area
  - Total: 24,530 km^{2} (9,470 sq mi)

Population (2020)
  - Total: 53,946
  - Density: 2.199/km^{2} (5.696/sq mi)
- Time zone: UTC+8 (China Standard)
- Website: www.wlthq.gov.cn

Urad Rear Banner

Chinese name
- Simplified Chinese: 乌拉特后旗
- Traditional Chinese: 烏拉特後旗
Transcriptions
Standard Mandarin
- Hanyu Pinyin: Wūlātè Hòu Qí

Mongolian name
- Mongolian Cyrillic: Урадын хойд хошуу
- Mongolian script: ᠤᠷᠠᠳ ᠤᠨ ᠬᠣᠶᠢᠲᠤ ᠬᠣᠰᠢᠭᠤ
Transcriptions
- SASM/GNC: Urad-un Qoyitu Qosiɣu

Urad Rear Banner (Mongolian: ᠤᠷᠠᠳ ᠤᠨ ᠬᠣᠶᠢᠲᠤ ᠬᠣᠰᠢᠭᠤ; Chinese: 乌拉特后旗) is a banner of the Inner Mongolia Autonomous Region, China. It is located in the west of the region, 44 kilometres (27 mi) northwest of the city of Bayan Nur, which administers this banner, and borders the Republic of Mongolia's Ömnögovi Province to the north. The banner has a total area of 24,925 km^{2} (9,624 sq mi) and in 2020 had a population of 53,946. It is located in the prefectural-level municipality of Bayannur city. The capital is moved to the town of Bayan Bulag. This Banner division is also home to the Upper Cretaceous Bayan Mandahu Formation.

== Demographics ==
The proportion of nationalities in Urad Rear Banner (2020)
| Nationality | Percentage |
| Han | 74.8% |
| Mongols | 24.3% |
| Manchus | 0.3% |
| Hui People | 0.2% |
| Tibetans | 0.1% |
| Others | 0.3% |
Source of the population statistics :

== Administrative divisions ==
Urad Rear Banner is divided into 3 towns and 3 sums.

| Name | Simplified Chinese | Hanyu Pinyin | Mongolian (Hudum Script) | Mongolian (Cyrillic) | Administrative division code |
|---|---|---|---|---|---|
Towns
| Bayan Bulag Town | 巴音宝力格镇 | Bāyīnbǎolìgé Zhèn | ᠪᠠᠶᠠᠨᠪᠤᠯᠠᠭ ᠪᠠᠯᠭᠠᠰᠤ | Баянбулаг балгас | 150825100 |
| Hoh Ondor Town | 呼和温都尔镇 | Hūhéwēndū’ěr Zhèn | ᠬᠥᠬᠡᠥ᠋ᠨᠳᠥᠷ ᠪᠠᠯᠭᠠᠰᠤ | Хөх-Өндөр балгас | 150825101 |
| Qog Ondor Town | 潮格温都尔镇 | Cháogéwēndū’ěr Zhèn | ᠴᠣᠭᠥ᠌ᠨᠳᠥᠷ ᠪᠠᠯᠭᠠᠰᠤ | Цог-Өндөр балгас | 150825102 |
Sums
| Hogq Sum | 获各琦苏木 | Huògèqí Sūmù | ᠬᠥᠭᠡᠴᠦ ᠰᠤᠮᠤ | Хөгц сум | 150825200 |
| Bayan Qandman Sum | 巴音前达门苏木 | Bāyīnqiándámén Sūmù | ᠪᠠᠶᠠᠨᠴᠢᠨᠳᠠᠮᠤᠨᠢ ᠰᠤᠮᠤ | Баянчандмань сум | 150825201 |
| Ugin Gol Sum | 乌盖苏木 | Wūgài Sūmù | ᠤᠤ ᠶᠢᠨ ᠭᠣᠣᠯ ᠰᠤᠮᠤ | Өгөн-гол сум | 150825202 |

== Climate ==
Climate data for Urad Rear Banner, elevation 1,035 m (3,396 ft), (1991–2020 normals)
| Month | Jan | Feb | Mar | Apr | May | Jun | Jul | Aug | Sep | Oct | Nov | Dec | Year |
|---|---|---|---|---|---|---|---|---|---|---|---|---|---|
| Mean daily maximum °C (°F) | −3.6 (25.5) | 2.3 (36.1) | 10.6 (51.1) | 19.1 (66.4) | 25.2 (77.4) | 29.2 (84.6) | 30.6 (87.1) | 28.8 (83.8) | 23.8 (74.8) | 16.3 (61.3) | 5.7 (42.3) | −2.1 (28.2) | 15.5 (59.9) |
| Daily mean °C (°F) | −10.3 (13.5) | −5.3 (22.5) | 3.1 (37.6) | 11.8 (53.2) | 18.2 (64.8) | 22.9 (73.2) | 24.6 (76.3) | 22.4 (72.3) | 16.4 (61.5) | 8.4 (47.1) | −0.3 (31.5) | −8.1 (17.4) | 8.7 (47.6) |
| Mean daily minimum °C (°F) | −16.3 (2.7) | −11.9 (10.6) | −3.9 (25.0) | 3.8 (38.8) | 10.1 (50.2) | 15.8 (60.4) | 18.0 (64.4) | 15.8 (60.4) | 9.6 (49.3) | 1.4 (34.5) | −5.5 (22.1) | −13.4 (7.9) | 2.0 (35.5) |
| Average precipitation mm (inches) | 0.6 (0.02) | 1.0 (0.04) | 2.1 (0.08) | 5.0 (0.20) | 11.4 (0.45) | 38.4 (1.51) | 30.5 (1.20) | 33.3 (1.31) | 21.5 (0.85) | 4.6 (0.18) | 1.9 (0.07) | 0.5 (0.02) | 150.8 (5.93) |
| Average precipitation days (≥ 0.1 mm) | 0.9 | 0.7 | 1.3 | 1.2 | 2.8 | 6.5 | 7.6 | 6.4 | 5.1 | 2.1 | 0.7 | 0.6 | 35.9 |
| Average snowy days | 2.1 | 1.0 | 1.0 | 0.4 | 0 | 0 | 0 | 0 | 0 | 0.4 | 1.0 | 1.2 | 7.1 |
| Average relative humidity (%) | 48 | 39 | 32 | 27 | 28 | 41 | 52 | 54 | 53 | 47 | 52 | 51 | 44 |
| Mean monthly sunshine hours | 225.2 | 233.0 | 275.6 | 293.7 | 320.0 | 304.3 | 285.6 | 280.3 | 253.1 | 261.1 | 215.0 | 215.1 | 3,162 |
| Percentage possible sunshine | 75 | 77 | 74 | 73 | 71 | 68 | 63 | 66 | 69 | 77 | 74 | 75 | 72 |
Source: China Meteorological Administration

Climate data for Bayinwendu'er Sumu (Hailisu), Urad Rear Banner, elevation 1,510 m (4,950 ft), (1991–2020 normals)
| Month | Jan | Feb | Mar | Apr | May | Jun | Jul | Aug | Sep | Oct | Nov | Dec | Year |
|---|---|---|---|---|---|---|---|---|---|---|---|---|---|
| Mean daily maximum °C (°F) | −6.5 (20.3) | −1.4 (29.5) | 6.1 (43.0) | 14.6 (58.3) | 21.3 (70.3) | 26.7 (80.1) | 29.2 (84.6) | 27.0 (80.6) | 21.0 (69.8) | 12.6 (54.7) | 2.8 (37.0) | −5.2 (22.6) | 12.4 (54.2) |
| Daily mean °C (°F) | −13.4 (7.9) | −8.5 (16.7) | −0.8 (30.6) | 8.1 (46.6) | 15.0 (59.0) | 20.8 (69.4) | 23.3 (73.9) | 21.0 (69.8) | 14.7 (58.5) | 5.8 (42.4) | −3.8 (25.2) | −11.5 (11.3) | 5.9 (42.6) |
| Mean daily minimum °C (°F) | −18.1 (−0.6) | −13.6 (7.5) | −6.3 (20.7) | 1.5 (34.7) | 8.1 (46.6) | 14.0 (57.2) | 17.2 (63.0) | 15.2 (59.4) | 9.3 (48.7) | 0.9 (33.6) | −8.1 (17.4) | −16.0 (3.2) | 0.3 (32.6) |
| Average precipitation mm (inches) | 1.4 (0.06) | 1.4 (0.06) | 3.2 (0.13) | 4.7 (0.19) | 14.0 (0.55) | 27.1 (1.07) | 33.6 (1.32) | 36.9 (1.45) | 17.0 (0.67) | 5.0 (0.20) | 3.0 (0.12) | 2.4 (0.09) | 149.7 (5.91) |
| Average precipitation days (≥ 0.1 mm) | 2.8 | 1.9 | 2.4 | 2.1 | 4.1 | 5.9 | 8.2 | 7.2 | 4.8 | 2.5 | 2.5 | 3.1 | 47.5 |
| Average snowy days | 5.6 | 3.9 | 4.1 | 1.8 | 0.4 | 0 | 0 | 0 | 0 | 1.8 | 4.2 | 5.9 | 27.7 |
| Average relative humidity (%) | 58 | 47 | 35 | 26 | 28 | 33 | 41 | 44 | 41 | 40 | 49 | 58 | 42 |
| Mean monthly sunshine hours | 229.5 | 229.8 | 269.5 | 283.4 | 313.3 | 302.1 | 297.5 | 292.0 | 270.6 | 268.5 | 225.6 | 215.7 | 3,197.5 |
| Percentage possible sunshine | 77 | 76 | 72 | 70 | 69 | 67 | 65 | 69 | 73 | 80 | 77 | 76 | 73 |
Source: China Meteorological Administration
