= Paul Hyer =

Paul Van Hyer (June 2, 1926 – January 22, 2018) was a professor of Chinese History at Brigham Young University (BYU) and the founder of its Asian Studies program. He was also a key figure in the growth of the Church of Jesus Christ of Latter-day Saints (LDS Church) in Taiwan.

== Biography ==
Hyer was born in Ogden, Utah. During World War II, he served in the United States Navy in the Pacific Theatre. As a young man, he served as an LDS Church missionary in the Japanese Mission, which was located in Hawaii, from 1946 to 1948. While in Hawaii, Hyer set up a system to train missionaries in the Japanese language.

Hyer received a bachelor's degree in history from BYU in 1951. From the University of California, Berkeley, he received a master's degree in Asian history and Asian Social Institutions in 1953, and a PhD in Asian History in 1961.

Along with Sechin Jagchid, Hyer wrote the book A Mongolian Living Buddha which was a biography of Kanjurwa Khutughtu. Hyer also wrote Mongolia's Culture and Society with Sechin.

Besides his time as a BYU professor, Hyer also taught for three years in China. Hyer has also published several articles on the history of Inner Mongolia within the People's Republic of China as well as on Japanese-Tibetan relations and Lamanist Buddhism in Japan. He also contributed an article on the prospects for the LDS Church in Asia to the first volume of Dialogue: A Journal of Mormon Thought.

Besides living in China and Taiwan, Hyer and his family also lived for a time in Japan.

From 1982 to 1985 Hyer served as president of the LDS Church's Taiwan Taipei Mission. From 1988 to 1990, he served as president of the Taipei Taiwan Temple. During the time between these two positions, Hyer served as bishop of a BYU ward. Later Hyer was involved in the negotiations leading to the LDS Church getting recognition in Mongolia.

Hyer and first wife, Harriett Johns Hyer, had eight children and 36 grandchildren. Harriet died on July 2, 1990, while she was serving as matron of the Taipei Taiwan Temple. He was remarried to Karen Emily Claus, also a professor at BYU, who taught Business Ethics and Public Administration at the Marriott School of Management. They were married at the Salt Lake Temple on March 27, 1991, by Marion D. Hanks, Hyer's World War II companion and long-time friend.

Hyer has also served as president of the International Society, an organization of professionals who are LDS Church members that works to promote its programs, and those of BYU, on an international basis.
