= Suiyuan campaign order of battle =

The Suiyuan campaign was a Japanese attempt to increase the size of their puppet state of Inner Mongolia in 1936.

== Inner Mongolia ==
Inner Mongolian Army 1936

- Commander in Chief - Demchugdongrub (with Japanese chief adviser Ryūkichi Tanaka)
  - Teh Wang's personal troops
  - Li Shouxin's Command: Li Shouxin
    - 1st, 2nd, 3rd, 4th Cavalry Division and an artillery regiment (Jehol Mongols, Chahar Mongols)
  - Bao Yueqing's Command: Bao Yueqing
    - 5th, 6th, 7th, 8th Cavalry Division and an artillery regiment(Mongol irregulars and bandits)
  - 9th Division (served as security guard division)
- total: 9,000–10,000 men
- Grand Han Righteous Army - Wang Ying
  - 4 Brigades (6,000 men, Japanese trained Chinese soldiers and former bandits)

Japanese:

- 20-30 advisors with each Mongolian unit and Headquarters staff
- A few field artillery pieces and crews
- 30 armoured cars and tankettes and crews
- Crews and ground support for 28 planes

== China ==
Suiyuan Provincial Forces 1936

1st Route Army - Fu Zuoyi

- 35th Army - Fu Zuoyi (concurrent)
  - 211th Infantry Brigade
    - 419, 421, 422 Infantry Regiments
  - 218th Infantry Brigade -
    - 420, 435, 436 Infantry Regiments
  - 205th brigade (less 407th Regiment)
  - 7th Independent Brigade - Ma Yanshou
  - 10th Reserve Regiment
  - 21st, 29th Artillery Regiment
  - Antiaircraft battalion (less 1st and 3rd battery)

2nd Route Army - Tang Enbo (en route to Suiyuan)

- 13th Army, with the attached 72nd Division and the 27th Artillery Regiment.

3rd Route Army - Li Fuying (Garrison of Jinbei, Tianzhen, Gaoyang area)

- 68th Division - Li Fuying (concurrent)
- 24th Artillery Regiment
- 1st and 3rd batteries of the Antiaircraft battalion.

Cavalry Army - Zhao Chengshou

- assistant deputy commander - Men Bingyue
  - 1st Cavalry Division - Peng Yubin
  - 2nd Cavalry Division
  - 7th Cavalry Division - Men Bingyue

Reserve Army - Wang Jingguo (Garrison of Zhusui, Baotou area)

- 70th Division - Wang Jingguo (concurrent)
  - (Less 205th brigade, its 407th Regiment remained with the division)
- 8th Independent Brigade - Meng Xianji
