= Battle of Taiyuan order of battle =

Order of battle for the Battle of Taiyuan in the Second Sino-Japanese War.

== Japan ==
North China Front Army – Gen. Juichi Terauchi

- 1st Army – Gen. Kyoji Kotouki (beginning in November)
  - 5th Division – Gen. Seishirō Itagaki (from September)
    - 9th Infantry Brigade (Brigade sent to Shanghai Nov. 1937)
      - 11th Infantry Regiment
      - 41st Infantry Regiment
    - 21st Infantry Brigade
      - 21st Infantry Regiment
      - 42nd Infantry Regiment
    - 5th Mountain Artillery Regiment
    - 5th Cavalry Regiment
    - 5th Engineer Regiment
    - 5th Transport Regiment
    - 4th? Tank Regiment/Battalion (from Sakai Bde?)
  - 20th Division – Gen Josaburo Kamamine (beginning in November)
    - 39th Infantry Brigade
      - 77th Infantry Regiment
      - 78th Infantry Regiment
    - 40th Infantry Brigade
      - 79th Infantry Regiment
      - 80th Infantry Regiment
    - 26th Field Artillery Regiment
    - 28th Cavalry Regiment
    - 20th Engineer Regiment
    - 20th Transport Regiment
    - 1st Tank Regiment/Battalion – Col. Baba***
  - 109th Division - ? (beginning in November)
    - 31st Infantry Brigade
      - 69th Infantry Regiment
      - 107th Infantry Regiment
    - 118th Infantry Brigade
      - 119th Infantry Regiment
      - 136th Infantry Regiment
    - 109th Mountain Artillery Regt
    - 109th Cavalry Regiment
    - 109th Engineer Regiment
    - 109th Transport Regiment

Kwantung Army

- Chahar Expeditionary Force - Lt. General Hideki Tōjō
  - 1st Independent Mixed Brigade(Sakai Brigade)- Lt. Gen Sakai Koji +
    - 4th Tank Battalion
      - (Type 89 Med Tanks)
    - 1st Independent Infantry Regiment - Major Senda
    - 1st Independent Artillery Battalion
    - 1st Independent Engineer Company
  - 11th Independent Mixed Brigade - Gen. Shigiyasu Suzuki
    - 11th Independent Infantry Regiment
    - 12th Independent Infantry Regiment
    - 11th Independent Cavalry Company
    - 11th Independent Field Artillery Regiment
    - 12th Independent Mountain Gun Regiment
    - 11th Independent Engineer Company
    - 11th Independent Transport Company
  - 2nd Mixed Brigade (from 1st Division, Kwantung Army)- ?
    - 13th Infantry Regiment
    - 57th Infantry Regiment
    - 1st Field Artillery Regiment
    - 1 Company/1st Cavalry Regiment
    - 1 Company/1st Engineer Regiment
    - 1 Company/1st Transport Regiment
  - 15th Mixed Brigade(from 2nd Division, Kwantung Army) - ?
    - 16th Infantry Regiment
    - 30th Infantry Regiment
    - 2nd Field Artillery Regiment
    - 1 Company/2nd Cavalry Regiment
    - 1 Company/2nd Engineer Regiment
    - 1 Company/2nd Transport Regiment
  - Mongolian Army – Prince Teh Wang, Pao Yueh-ching
    - 1st Cavalry Division
    - 2nd Cavalry Division
    - 3rd Cavalry Division
    - 4th Cavalry Division
    - 5th Cavalry Division
    - 6th Cavalry Division
    - 7th Cavalry Division
    - 8th Cavalry Division

Army Airforce - ?

- 1st Daitai/16th Hiko Rentai: Ki-10
- 2nd Daitai: Ki-10 Fighters
- 12th Hiko Rentai: Ki-2 bombers and Type 94 observation planes

== China ==
2nd War Area - Yan Xishan (after first part of September 1937)

- 6th Group Army – Gen. Yang Aiyuan, deputy Sun Chu
  - 33rd Army - Sun Chu
    - 3rd Sep. Brigade - Chang Chi-yu
    - 8th Sep. Brigade - ?
    - 73rd Division - Liu Feng-pin
  - 34th Army - Yang Cheng-yuan
    - 196th Independent Brigade - Chiang Yu-chen
    - 203rd Independent Brigade - Liang Chien-tang
    - 71st Division - Kuao Tsung-fen
  - New 2nd Division - Chin Hsien-chang
- 7th Group Army - Fu Zuoyi
  - 35th Army - Fu Zuoyi
    - 218th Brigade - Tung Chu-wu
    - 211th Brigade - Sun Lan-feng
    - 205th Brigade - Tien Shu-mei
  - 61st Army - Chen Chang-Chih
    - 200th Brigade - Liu Tan-fu
    - 7th Separate Brigade - Man Yen-shou
    - 101st Division - Li Chu-kung
  - 17th Army - Kao Kuei-tse
    - 84th Division - Kao Kuei-tse (concurrent)
    - 21st Division - Li Hsien-chou
  - New 2nd Brigade - An Hua-ting
  - New 6th Brigade - Wang Tse-hsiu
  - New 2nd Cavalry Brigade - Shih yu-shan
  - 6th Cavalry Army - Men Ping-yueh
    - 7th Cavalry Division - Men Ping-yueh (concurrent)
    - 1st Temporary Cavalry Division - Feng Piao
- 14th Group Army - Wei Li-huang
  - 14th Army - Li Mo-yen(concurrent)
    - 10th Division - Li Mo-yen
    - 83rd Division - Li Kan
  - 9th Army - Hu Meng-lin
    - 47th Division - Pei Chang-hui
    - 54th Division - Liu Chia-chi
  - 85th Division - Chen Tieh
  - 5th Separate Brigade - Cheng Ting-chen
- 18th Group Army - Zhu De, deputy Peng Dehuai
  - 115th Division - Lin Biao
  - 120th Division - He Long
  - 129th Division - Liu Bocheng
- 19th Army - Wang Ching-kuo
  - 2nd Separate Brigade - Fang Ke-yu
  - 215th Brigade - Tu Kun
  - 72nd Division - Tuan Shu-hua
- 66th Division - Tu Chun-yi
- 1st Cavalry Army - Chao Cheng-shou
  - 1st Cavalry Div. - Pen Yu-pin
  - 2nd Cavalry Div. - Sun Chang-sheng
- 15th Army - Liu Mao-en
  - 64th Div- Wu Ting-lin
  - 65th Div- Liu Mao-en(concurrent)
- Advance Force Commander - Ma Chan-shan
  - 6th Cavalry Div. - Liu Kuei-wu
- 2nd Cavalry Army - Ho Chu-kuo
  - 3rd Cavalry Div. - Hsu Liang
- Ladies Pass Defense Group - Deputy Commander 2nd War Area, Huang Shao-hsiung
  - 1st Corps - Sun Lien-chung
    - 27th Division - Fen An-pang
    - 30th Div. - Chang Chin-chao
    - 31st Div. - Chih Feng-cheng
    - 44th Sep. Bde - Chang Hua-tang
  - 3rd Army - Tseng Wan-chung
    - 7th Div. - Li Shih-lung
    - 12th Div. - Tang Huai-yuan
  - 14th Corps - Feng Chin-tsai
    - 42nd Div. - Liu Yen-piao
    - 169th Div. - Wu Shih-ming
  - 94th Div. - Chu Huai-ping
  - 17th Div. - Wu Shih-ming
- 13th Army - Tang Enbo
  - 4th Division - Wang Wan-ling
  - 89th Division - Wang Chung-lien

Airforce - ?

- 28th PS - [7 Hawk IIs ] - Captain Chan Kee-Wong from 16 September
  - Up to this point, IJAAF aircraft had been able to operate freely in support of the Japanese Army in Northern China.

=== Chinese Force Defending Xinkow Line ===
Unified Command Defending Xinkow line - Wei Li-huang

- Left Flank Army - Li Mo-yen
  - 14th Army - Li Mo-yen
    - 10th Division - Li Mo-yen (concurrent)
    - 83rd Division - Li Kan
  - 85th Division - Chen Tieh
  - 66th Division - Tu Chun-yi
  - 71st Division - Kuao Tsung-fen
- Central Army - Wang Ching-kuo
  - 19th Army - Wang Ching-kuo
    - 2nd Separate Brigade - Fang Ke-yu
    - 215th Brigade - Tu Kun
    - 72nd Division - Tuan Shu-hua
  - 35th Army - Fu Tso-yi?
    - 218th Brigade - Tung Chu-wu
    - 211th Brigade - Sun Lan-feng
    - 205th Brigade - Tien Shu-mei
  - 61st Army - Chen Chang-Chih
    - 200th Brigade - Liu Tan-fu
    - 7th Separate Brigade - Man Yen-shou
    - 101st Division - Li Chu-kung
  - 9th Army - Hu Meng-lin
    - 47th Division - Pei Chang-hui
    - 54th Division - Liu Chia-chi
- Right Flank Army - Liu Mao-en
  - 15th Army - Liu Mao-en
    - 64th Division - Wu Ting-lin
    - 65th Division - Liu Mao-en
  - 33rd Army - Sun Chu
    - 3rd Sep. Bde - Chang Chi-yu
    - 8th Sep. Bde - ?
    - 73rd Div. - Liu Feng-pin
  - 17th Army - Kao Kuei-tse
    - 84st Div. - Kao Kuei-tse (concurrent)
    - 21st Div. - Li Hsien-chou
- 5th Separate Brigade - Cheng Ting-chen
