= Tianjin campaign =

1949 military campaign

- Part of the Pingjin Campaign of the Chinese Civil War
Date	January 3, 1949 – January 15, 1949
Location	Tianjin, China
Result	Communist victory

Belligerents
(Republic of China (1912–1949)) Republic of China Army	(China) People's Liberation Army

Commanders and leaders
(Republic of China (1912–1949)) Chen Changjie (POW); (Republic of China (1912–1949)) Qiu Zongding (POW); (Republic of China (1912–1949)) Yang Wei (POW); (Republic of China (1912–1949)) Li Yeqing (POW); (Republic of China (1912–1949)) Cheng Zijian (POW)	(China) Liu Yalou

Strength
130,000	340,000

Casualties and losses
All killed or captured	7,030 killed, 19,214 wounded

The Tianjin campaign was the epitome of the Pingjin campaign, fought between the nationalists and the communists during the Chinese Civil War in the post-World War II era. The result of the Tianjin campaign helped to determine the outcome of the Pingjin campaign.

The original communist plan was to capture Tanggu first to cut off the nationalist escape route via sea and then force the nationalists in Beijing and Tianjin to surrender, in order to save the two historical cities from the destruction of the war. However, the nationalist resolve to defend the cities to the end was strong and reconnaissance had revealed the sounding regions of Tanggu was not suitable for building fortifications and deploying assaulting forces, and the region strongly favored defenders. The communists were forced to change their plan by attacking Tianjin first. According to the geography of Tianjin, which was characterized in its long span in the north–south direction and short span in the east–west direction, the communists made a plan of simultaneously attacking from the east and west, cutting off the city in the middle, and then first taking the southern portion of the city, and afterward taking the northern portion of the city.

From January 3, 1949, through to January 12, 1949, the communists cleared all 18 nationalist strongholds outside the city, and the defenders were forced to take refuge behind the city wall. After the nationalists behind the city wall had refused to surrender for three times when asked, the communists launched their final offensive on the city on January 14, 1949, at 10:00 AM. After 29 hours of fierce fighting, the entire besieged nationalist garrison of the city totaling more than 130,000 was completely annihilated, and Chen Changjie(陳長捷), the nationalist commander-in-chief of the defense, was captured alive along with many of his subordinates, including his deputy, Major General Qiu Zongding (秋宗鼎), the deputy commander-in-chief of nationalist Tianjin Garrison, Major General Yang Wei (楊威), the chief-of-staff of the nationalist force defending Tianjin, Major General Li Yeqing (李叶清), the secretary-general of nationalist headquarter in Tianjin, and Major General Cheng Zijian (程子践), the nationalist inspector-general from Nanjing, hand-picked personally by Chiang Kai-shek himself. With the exception of the 7th Chinese Textile Factory, which was completely destroyed in the final offensive, most of the rest of the infrastructure of Tianjin was captured intact. The price paid by the attacking communist force is relative low in the campaign, suffering a casualty rate that included 7,030 killed, and 19,214 wounded, without any missing or being captured. Among those communists killed were several hundred Japanese troops of the former-Japanese Imperial Army, who stayed in China after World War II and joined the communists.

== Outcome ==
The immediate consequence of the nationalist defeat in Tianjin campaign was that the nationalist garrison of Tanggu, consisting of the 17th Army Group and five divisions from the 87th Army, had been completely isolated and had to withdraw via sea, which in turn, worsened the overall situation for the nationalists during the Pingjin campaign. The nationalist defeat in the Tianjin campaign was also one of the most important factors forcing Fu Zuoyi to surrender to the communists, which resulted in the conclusion of the Pingjin campaign.

== See also ==
- Outline of the Chinese Civil War
- National Revolutionary Army
- History of the People's Liberation Army
