= Yao Zhe =

Chinese general

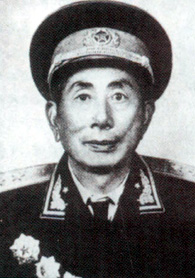
- Born: Shaoyang County, Hunan Province, China
- Died: May 27, 1979 (aged 72)
- Occupation: People's Liberation Army lieutenant general

Yao Zhe (Chinese: 姚喆, name at birth: Yáo Zhìzhāng 姚秩章) (August 28, 1906 – May 27, 1979) was a People's Liberation Army lieutenant general. He was born in Shaoyang County, Hunan Province. Yao joined the Chinese Workers' and Peasants' Red Army in July 1928 and the Chinese Communist Party in 1929. He fought alongside Liu Zhidan in the Chinese Civil War. During the Second Sino-Japanese War, he was active in Daqing Mountain as part of the Shanxi-Chahar Province-Hebei. He participated in the Datong-Jining Campaign against Fu Zuoyi.
