= Battle of Xinkou =

Battle during the Second Sino-Japanese War

Coordinates: 38.0000°N 112.0000°E

- Part of the Battle of Taiyuan in the Second Sino-Japanese War and the interwar period
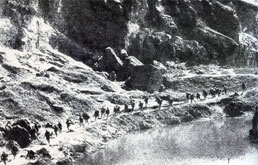
- Chinese troops marching to defend Xinkou mountain passes
Date	October 11 – November 5, 1937 (3 weeks and 4 days)
Location	Niangzi Pass and Taiyuan city in the Republic of China
Result	Japanese victory

Belligerents
(Republic of China (1912–1949)) China: Chinese Nationalist Party; Chinese Communist Party	(Empire of Japan) Japan

Commanders and leaders
(Republic of China (1912–1949)) Yan Xishan (Republic of China (1912–1949)) Yang Aiyuan (Republic of China (1912–1949)) Wei Lihuang; Zhu De (Republic of China (1912–1949)) Fu Zuoyi (Republic of China (1912–1949)) Li Mo'an (Republic of China (1912–1949)) Hao Mengling †	(Empire of Japan) Itagaki Seishiro

Strength
280,000 in 52 divisions	140,000 in 4 divisions 350+ artillery guns 150+ tanks 300 aircraft

Casualties and losses
Western Claim: 100,000 dead, injured or missing Chinese Claim: (Note: Including the Eighth Route Army); Battle of Xinkou: According to the 'history of the Anti-Japanese War': 55,094 killed, wounded, or missing (Note: Including in the battle of Yuanping from October 1 until October 10); According to the statistical table of the Second Military Front: 33,264 killed, wounded, or missing (Note: From October 12 until November 10); Battle of Niangziguan: According to the 'history of the Anti-Japanese War': 28,516 killed, wounded, or missing; According to the statistical table of the Second Military Front: approximately 27,043 casualties	Western Claim: 20,000 killed Tens of thousands more wounded Dozens of tanks and 24+ planes Battle of Xinkou: Chinese Claim: 21,000 casualties Japanese Claim: 6,245 casualties Battle of Niangziguan: Chinese Claim: 3,520 casualties Japanese Claim: approximately 2,400 casualties

The Battle of Xinkou (simplified Chinese: 忻口会战; traditional Chinese: 忻口會戰; pinyin: Xīnkǒu Huìzhàn) was a decisive engagement of the Taiyuan Campaign, the second of the 22 major engagements between the National Revolutionary Army and Imperial Japanese Army during the Second Sino-Japanese War.

== Prelude ==
After battles at Nankou, the Chahar Expeditionary Force of the Japanese Kwantung Army occupied Datong in Shanxi province, and began their assault on the Yenbei area. The Japanese Fifth Division started their attack from Hebei marching westwards and taking the towns of Guanglin, Linzhou, Hongyuan in northwest Shanxi.

By late September, the Japanese commander Itagaki Seishiro ordered the fifth division and the Chahar Expeditionary Force to begin attacking the Chinese defense line along the inner Great Wall in Shanxi. The Commander of the 2nd War Zone, Yan Xishan, ordered Chinese troops to retreat and set up a defense line in Niangziguan and Pingxingguan.

Even after the Eighth Route Army led by Lin Biao successfully ambushed the Japanese at the Battle of Pingxingguan, the Chinese defenders suffered heavy casualties under Japanese artillery and tank assaults and were forced to retreat to Wutaishan to set up another defense line at Xinkou.

== Battle of Xinkou ==
Yan Xishan gathered all available Chinese troops under his command to make a stand at Xinkou because the location was flanked by Wutaishan and Yunzhonshan, which was favorable for the defenders and was a gateway to Taiyuan, the capital of Shanxi. On October 1, the Japanese central command ordered Itagaki Seishiro to lead the Fifth Division and Chahar Expeditionary Force for the final assault on Taiyuan.

On the same day, the military commission of the Chinese Nationalist government ordered the 14th Group Army (commanded by Wei Lihuang) to fight the Japanese at Xinkou. The 14th Group Army, along with Yan Xishan's eight armies, organized a frontal defense of Xinkou, while the 18th Group Army (without the 120th division) and 101st division, 73rd division and the newly formed 2nd Division organized the defense on the right flank along the Sutou River's south bank, commanded by Zhu De, while one division was sent to the enemy's rear to harass their left flank.

The 6th Group Army organized into two divisions and one brigade, comprised the Chinese defense on the left flank along with the 120th division (commanded by Yang Aiyuan), which concentrated their forces at Heiyu and Yangfangkou, while one division was sent to the enemy's rear to harass their right flank. The 34th and 35th Armies were in reserve, commanded by Fu Zuoyi, to control the Dingxiang and Xinxian area.

On October 2, the 2nd brigade from the Chahar Expeditionary Force started their attack on Gouxian (now Gouyangxian), and the 19th Army's Chinese defenders held off the attack until October 9, by then the Gouxian had fallen into Japanese hands. The 15th brigade from the Chahar Expeditionary Force marched around Gouxian and attacked Yuanping, and engaged the 34th Army's 196 brigade, led by Jiang Yuzhen. After intense close-quarter combat, the defending Chinese soldiers were wiped out and the Japanese took Yuanping on October 12. By this time, the invading forces were ready to make their move on Xinkou.

Due to the unfavorable developments on the battlefields, Chinese commander Wei Lihuang had to re-organize the defense line on October 2. He positioned the 9th, 61st, and 35th Armies to form the central defense line, holding their position along the Xinkou mountains passes; while the 14th Army, 71st and 66th Divisions commanded by Li Mo'an formed the left flank, controlling the Yunzhongshan area. Finally, the 33rd, 17th and 15th Armies formed the right flank, controlling Wutaishan.

On October 13, Itagaki Seishiro led 50,000 Japanese troops on a major assault against Xinkou. The 5th Division was on the left wing, and concentrated their attack on Nanhuaihua; while the 15th Brigade was on the right wing, focusing their efforts on Dabaishui, with the 2nd Brigade was in the rear defending the inner Great Wall. The 5th Divisions used 30+ airplanes, 40+ heavy artilleries, 50+ tanks to flank the infantry's assault; while the Chinese central defense forces used the favorable terrain to put up stiff resistances despite a lack of firepower.

The Xinkou battles rages on for days, with the Nanhuahua position changing hands many times. On October 16 the Chinese central defense force begin a major counter-attack to take the high grounds at Nanhuahua, during this battle the commander of the 9th Army Hao Mengling became the first Chinese army general to be killed in action during the Second Sino-Japanese War. Despite his death, the 61st Army commander Chen Zhangjie and subsequently the 19th Army commander Wang Jingguo continued to lead the defense of Xinkou and successfully held their defensive positions.

During this time, the Communists' Eighth Route Army executed several guerrilla attacks in the Japanese troops rear at Lingqiu, Guangling, Weixian, Pingxingguan, Ningwu and Yanmenguan. On the evening of October 19, the 769th Regiment of the 120th Division attacked Yangmingbao airbase, and successfully destroyed 24 Japanese airplanes on the ground.

By this time the Japanese had suffered close to 20,000 casualties without making much progress on their assault of Xinkou. Therefore, the Japanese Northern China Area Army had to add three additional regiments on October 22, 27 and 29, to assist in the attack of Nanhauhua. However, the Japanese troops still could not take this important position and had to re-direct their attack to Dabaishui, and the Chinese defenders were able to fight the Japanese to a stalemate.

== Defense of Niangziguan ==
The military commission of the Chinese Nationalist government ordered troops of the 1st War Zone to relocate and set up defense at Niangziguan, with the 17th and 30th Divisions defending the center, 3rd Army positioned at the right wing and 14th Group Army on the left wing. The Chinese commander for the operation was assigned to Huang Shaohong, the deputy commander of the 2nd War Zone.

On October 11, the 20th division of the Japanese army captured Jingxing. The Japanese used only some troops to attack Niangziguan, and their main force marched around and captured Jiuguan. With the defenders at Niangziguan now effectively surrounded, Yan Xishan hasty ordered the 26th Army, led by Sun Lianzhong and stationed in northern Shanxi, to move to Niangziguan and to organize and conduct counter-attacks, but it did not retake Jingxing as planned. On October 21, the 20th division was reinforced by the 109th division and continued their attack on Niangziguan from the south, aided by Japanese bombers and fighters.

On October 26, four Japanese commando battalions were able to break through the Chinese 3rd Army defenses at Ceyuzhen and breach the Niangziguan defense line. The Chinese forces were forced to retreat to Taiyuan and were chased by the Japanese attackers along the Shijiazhuang – Taiyuan railways. On November 11, the Japanese troops captured Shouyang after repelling an ambush by the 41st Army. By then, all Chinese troops at Xinkou were ordered to retreat to Taiyuan to avoid being encircled by the enemy, and the Japanese army had finally won the Battle of Xinkou.

== Conclusion ==
The battle of Xinkou marked the first large-scale cooperation between the provincial army (Yan Xishan's Shanxi troops), Chinese Communists (Eighth Route Army), and Chiang Kai-shek's Central Army (14th Group Army) during the Second Sino-Japanese War. Although the Chinese defenders fought bravely on a united front against the enemy during this campaign, they had a large shortage of firepower, especially with the ill-equipped 8th route army. A personal account of General Li Mo'an stated that the only weapon the Chinese infantry had against Japanese tanks was Molotov cocktails, and many defenders on the left flank were simply run over by tanks.

After this battle and the subsequent battle around the city of Taiyuan, the Chinese effectively lost control of northern China and resistance was reduced to minor guerrilla attacks behind enemy lines. However, because the communists and nationalists co-operated well and the Japanese also took serious losses, many Chinese were inspired to join the fight against the Japanese invaders, especially when Jiang Yuzhen and other officers were martyred.

In conclusion, the Chinese forces ultimately lost the battle, paying the price of 100,000 troops dead, injured or missing, and were forced to retreat. However, they were able to kill some 20,000 Japanese troops, wound thousands more, and destroy dozens of tanks and more than 24 aircraft, setting a record high for the scale of damage inflicted to the Japanese in a single battle in Northern China.

== Sources ==
- Hsu Long-hsuen and Chang Ming-kai, History of The Sino-Japanese War (1937–1945) 2nd Ed., 1971. Translated by Wen Ha-hsiung, Chung Wu Publishing; 33, 140th Lane, Tung-hwa Street, Taipei, Taiwan Republic of China. Pg. 195–200, Map 6
- 中国抗日战争正面战场作战记 China's Anti-Japanese War Combat Operations Author : Guo Rugui, editor-in-chief Huang Yuzhang Press : Jiangsu People's Publishing House Date published : 2005-7-1 ISBN 7-214-03034-9
