= Guo Jingyun =

Chinese general (1898–1948)

- 郭景雲
- Born: 20 July 1898; Fuping County, Shaanxi, China
- Died: 22 December 1948 (aged 50); Huailai County, Zhangjiakou, Hebei, China
- Military career
- Allegiance: Republic of China
- Branch: (Republic of China (1912–1949)) National Revolutionary Army
- Service years: 1923–1948
- Rank: Lieutenant General
- Commands: 35th Corps
- Conflicts: Northern Expedition; Central Plains War; Second Sino-Japanese War; Chinese Civil War; Pingjin campaign ‡‡
- Awards: Order of the Sacred Tripod

Guo Jingyun (Chinese: 郭景雲; pinyin: Guō Jǐngyún; Wade–Giles: Kuo Ching-yün; 20 July 1898 – 22 December 1948) courtesy name, Xiushan, was a native of Fuping, Shaanxi. He was a military figure in the early years of the Republic of China, a general in the Shanxi army, and a lieutenant general in the National Revolutionary Army. He committed suicide in battle during the Chinese Civil War.

== Biography ==
Guo Jingyun was born on 20 July 1898, in Fuping, Shaanxi. He joined the army at a young age, serving as a soldier in the 15th Mixed Brigade. Later, he joined the National Revolutionary Army under Sun Yue and Xu Yongchang. After the collapse of the National Revolutionary Army, Guo Jingyun followed Xu Yongchang to join the Shanxi Army. After the outbreak of the Second Sino-Japanese War, Guo Jingyun served as the commander of the 1st Regiment of the 7th Independent Brigade of the 35th Army, and later rose to the rank of commander of the 101st Division. He fought alongside Fu Zuoyi in Suiyuan and was known for his bravery in battle. After the war, Guo Jingyun became the commander of the 35th Army, responsible for defending the border area between Hebei, Chahar, and Shanxi. At the end of 1948, the Communist army advanced on the Beijing-Tianjin area. Guo Jingyun's troops, who were stationed in Zhangjiakou, prepared to return to defend the area, but were surrounded by the Communist army at Xinbao'an (now Huailai County, Hebei Province). On 22 December 1948, Guo Jingyun committed suicide after the city fell.
