= Righteous army (disambiguation) =

Righteous armies is a general term for a category of various irregular civilian militias in Korea.

Righteous army or Righteous armies may also refer to:

- Grand Han Righteous Army, a pro-Japanese Chinese army active in North China and Inner Mongolia in 1936
- Righteous Army, self-declared mutinous soldiers and officers of the Imperial Japanese Army during the February 26 incident
- Manchurian Righteous Army, a Japanese militia active in Northeast China and Outer Manchuria during the Russo-Japanese War
- Lashkar-e-Taiba (lit. 'Army of the Righteous'), a Pakistan-based Islamist militant organization
