= Inner Mongolian Army =

1936–45 Japanese collaborationist army

- Flag of the Mongol Military Government (1936–1939)
- Active: 1936–1945
- Country: Mengjiang
- Allegiance: Empire of Japan
- Type: Army
- Size: 10,000 (1936); 20,000 (1937)
- Engagements: Second Sino-Japanese War: Suiyuan Campaign; Operation Chahar; Battle of Taiyuan; World War II: Soviet invasion of Manchuria

Commanders
- Ceremonial chief: Prince Demchugdongrub
- Notable commanders: Li Shouxin; Jodbajab; Altanochir; Wang Ying

The Inner Mongolian Army, also sometimes called the Mengjiang National Army, referred to the Inner Mongolian military units in service of Imperial Japan and its puppet state of Mengjiang during the Second Sino-Japanese War, particularly those led by Prince Demchugdongrub. It was primarily a force of cavalry units, which mostly consisted of ethnic Mongols, with some Han Chinese infantry formations.

== History ==
=== Early actions ===
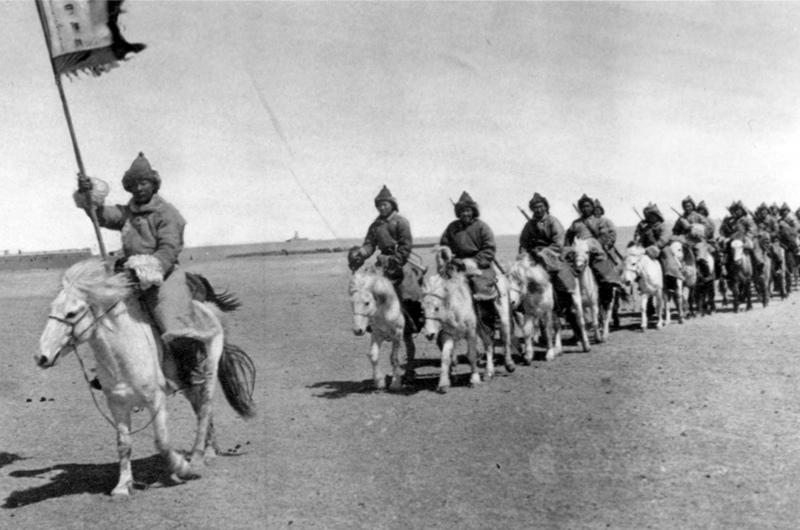
A unit of Prince De Wang's personal cavalry, 1935

After Japanese intrigues led to the formation of the Mongol Military Government under Prince Demchugdongrub (De Wang), the Inner Mongolian Army was initially formed from the personal units of various Mongol banner chiefs. Among those was Prince De Wang's personal bodyguard force of about 900 men, armed with weapons from the armories of the "Young Marshal" Zhang Xueliang, who had given them to Prince De Wang in an attempt to win his favor. It was not the largest Mongolian army but was the most efficient, being aided by Japanese advisers. Another source of recruits were the bandit gangs that were based in the region. Thus the original force came to include Mongolian tribesmen along with Han Chinese bandits and irregulars from the Manchukuo Imperial Army, the latter of which were led by the warlord Li Shouxin. He would later be appointed the commander of the army.

This exotic force suffered from disunity and poor discipline during the preparations to invade the Nationalist-controlled Inner Mongolian province of Suiyuan in 1936. The majority of them were also poorly armed, with only about half of them having rifles. They were primarily armed by weapons from the stocks of the defeated Young Marshal, which fell into the hands of the nearby Japanese puppet state of Manchukuo. Among the preparations was the setting up of an air arm for the Inner Mongolian Army, but this air force was a purely Japanese one. It consisted of Japanese aircraft flown by Japanese pilots, who did not even bother applying any Mongol insignia to their aircraft and just flew with the original Japanese ones. In total it had 28 planes and were based at a town about 65 kilometres (40 miles) north of Kalgan, the Inner Mongolian capital. They flew several bombing missions against Nationalist targets in an attempt to soften them up for the coming operation.

The invasion of Suiyuan finally began in October 1936 with Inner Mongolian units, a group of Han Chinese collaborators under Wang Ying called the Grand Han Righteous Army, and a number of Japanese "advisers" embedded among them. The whole operation was overseen by Japanese staff officers. First contact between Inner Mongolian and National Revolutionary Army troops occurred on 14 November in the town of Hongor. They launched several attacks against the Nationalist defenders over the course of the next couple of days but were repulsed each time with considerable casualties. The Mongols were not lacking in courage but were untrained for this sort of fighting. A final assault launched during a snowstorm on 16 November was likewise beaten back by Chinese machine guns. A surprise counterattack by the Nationalists on 17 November resulted in the Inner Mongolian Army and its allies being forced to retreat and regroup at their headquarters in Bailingmiao, where they received some training from the Japanese. The Nationalist General Fu Zuoyi then led an assault on the city, using three trucks to break through the city gates. The defending force reportedly consisted of the 7th Division of the Inner Mongolian Army and lost 300 killed, 600 wounded, and 300 captured. They also left behind a significant amount of equipment which was taken by the Nationalists.

Although the operation was a failure, skirmishes continued over the next eight months between Japanese and Inner Mongolian troops on one side and the Nationalists on the other. When the Second Sino-Japanese War began in 1937 after the Marco Polo Bridge Incident, they tried to invade again. In August 1937 six or seven divisions (some sources say nine) repulsed an assault by three Chinese divisions in heavy fighting. They were assisted by Japanese aircraft and gave the Nationalists some 2,000 casualties. An attack on Bailingmiao resulted in its recapture, led by cadets from the Military Training School that had been established in 1936. Over 20,000 Mongols advanced into the remaining provinces with Japanese support, later being involved in the Battle of Taiyuan.

The Inner Mongolian army and Japanese were defeated by technologically inferior Chinese warlord forces at the Battle of West Suiyuan in 1939-1940, and suffered heavy casualties, ending all Japanese attempts to invade Ningxia, Gansu and Qinghai. The Japanese had tanks, armoured cars, tear gas and air supremacy with fighter bombers while since the Chinese warlord armies involved had no airforce or equivalent armour. The Chinese warlord armies were both Han and Muslim Hui.

=== Final years ===
As the Pacific War began in 1941, Japan worked to mobilize all of its puppet troops, including the Inner Mongolian Army, to fight its war. They played on Prince De Wang's desire to become the emperor of all of Mongolia by promising to eventually give him Outer Mongolia (controlled by the Soviet satellite state the Mongolian People's Republic at the time). He committed Mongolian Army and police units to assisting Japanese operations throughout northern China against guerrillas and bandits during the period from 1938 until the defeat of Japan in 1945. These operations often resulted in high civilian casualties due to the Mongol and Japanese troops attacking civilians living in the areas where the insurgents were known to be hiding. By that time, Japanese officers had total control over both the Mengjiang government and army. They forced the Prince to sign a decree stating that the Mongolian government had declared war on the United Kingdom and the United States in 1941.

In August 1945, after the Soviets declared war on Japan, the Red Army and its allied Mongolian People's Army invaded both Manchukuo and Mengjiang during the Manchurian Strategic Offensive Operation. The few Inner Mongolian cavalry units that engaged the Soviets proved to be no match for the battle-hardened Red Army and were swept aside, with the Mongolian regime falling shortly after Japan surrendered. Prince De Wang led the army (which consisted of six divisions at the time, two cavalry and four infantry, and some independent brigades) in battle personally. Three divisions were destroyed by the Red Army, the rest reportedly joined the Chinese Communists.

=== Legacy ===
Tens of thousands to hundreds of thousands of Mongols were massacred in the Inner Mongolia incident in 1967-1969, one of the reasons is that they were accused of being collaborator remnants from the Mengjiang army.

== Organization ==
An Inner Mongolian infantryman in full uniform, 1937

The army was divided into divisions of about 1,500, with one division being composed of three regiments of 500 men each. One regiment included four cavalry squadrons and one machine gun company, the latter having a strength of 120 men. However, the standard structure mostly existed on paper and it was unlikely that it was used in reality. A military training school was also established in 1936 with an intake of 500 cadets. However, the cadets became disillusioned and about 200 of them deserted.

Their order of battle for the Suiyuan Campaign was as follows:

- Li Shouxin's Command
  - Rehe Mongols (3,000)
  - Chahar Mongols (1,000)
- Bao Yuejing's Command
  - 8th Division (2,000)
  - Mongol irregulars and bandits (3,000)
- Prince De Wang's troops (1,000)

By 1937 their forces were organized in six or nine divisions. In later years the Inner Mongolian Army was organized as follows:

- Inner Mongolian Army (4,400) – Li Shouxin
  - 4th Cavalry Division (900)
  - 5th Cavalry Division (900)
  - 6th Cavalry Division (800)
  - 7th Cavalry Division (800)
  - 8th Cavalry Division (1,000)
- Mongolian Self Government Army of Pin Banner 'Binguangfu' (3,000) – Bao Shan
- Mongolian Self Government Army of Po Banner 'Bowangfu' (3,000) – Han Sewang

=== Ranks ===
The rank system of the Inner Mongolian Army was modeled on those of the Imperial Japanese Army; however, instead of maroon bands on the insignia, the Mongols used blue. The rank of general was held by Prince De Wang as commander-in-chief and Li Shouxin as the commander of the army.

==== Commissioned officer ranks ====
The rank insignia of commissioned officers.

Rank group	General / flag officers			Senior officers			Junior officers
Chinese	上将	中将	少将	上校	中校	少校	上尉	中尉	少尉	准尉
Pinyin	Shàngjiàng	Zhōngjiàng	Shàojiàng	Shàngxiào	Zhōngxiào	Shàoxiào	Shàngwèi	Zhōngwèi	Shàowèi	Zhǔnwèi
Literal translation	Upper commander	Middle commander	Lower commander	Senior field officer	Middle field officer	Junior field officer	Upper officer	Middle officer	Lower officer	Officer-in-training
Mengjiang National Army

==== Other ranks ====
The rank insignia of non-commissioned officers and enlisted personnel.

Rank group	NCO's			Enlisted
Chinese	上士	中士	下士	上等兵	一等兵	二等兵
Pinyin	Shàngshì	Zhōngshì	Xiàshì	Shàngděngbīng	Yīděngbīng	Èrděngbīng
Literal translation	Upper soldier	Middle soldier	Lower soldier	Upper class soldier	First class soldier	Second class soldier
Mengjiang National Army

== Weapons and equipment ==
A wide variety of rifles found their way into the Inner Mongolian Army arsenal, mostly bought by Prince De Wang or given by the Japanese. The first weapons that they received were 10,000 Liao Type 13 rifles from the Mukden Arsenal, given as a gift by the Young Marshal Zhang Xueliang. Other small arms included the Swiss Sig. Model 1930 sub-machine gun, utilized by bodyguards in small numbers. Machine guns in use numbered about 200 with some of them being the Czech ZB-26 light machine gun. Those also came from Zhang Xueliang's former army after it was defeated by the Japanese. The Inner Mongolians had about 70 artillery pieces, mostly mortars, but also a few field and mountain guns, from former Nationalist stores. Reportedly they did use a few armored cars and tanks, but they were most likely operated by Japanese.

The early uniforms worn by Mongolian troops were their civilian clothing. Typical it consisted of a long blue padded cotton tunic that was worn which reached down to the ankles along with an orange sash around the waist. Headgear was either a lambs' wool hat or a colored turban wrapped around the head. The color of the turban varied with each Mongol banner clan having a distinctive one. In addition they wore a leather bandolier for cartridges which was slung over the left shoulder. Some soldiers were dressed in loose fitting cotton jacket and trousers along with a peak cap. In 1936 a new uniform was in use, modeled on the Nationalist Chinese uniform. It included a loose-fitting grey jacket and grey cotton trousers. A peaked grey cotton peaked cap was worn along with it (similar in appearance to those worn by the Russian Imperial Army during World War I). Other uniforms they used included the regular Japanese Army uniform but with Inner Mongolian insignia.

== See also ==
- Operation Chahar
- Jindandao incident
- Inner Mongolia incident

== Sources ==
=== References ===
- Jowett, Philip (2004). Rays of the Rising Sun, Volume 1: Japan's Asian Allies 1931–45, China and Manchukuo. Helion and Company Ltd. ISBN 978-1-874622-21-5.
- MacKinnon, Stephen; Lary, Diana (2007). China at War: Regions of China, 1937–45. Stanford University Press. ISBN 978-0804755092.
