= Suiyuan campaign =

Campaign in the Japanese invasions of China

- Part of the Inner Mongolian Campaign in the Second Sino-Japanese War and the interwar period
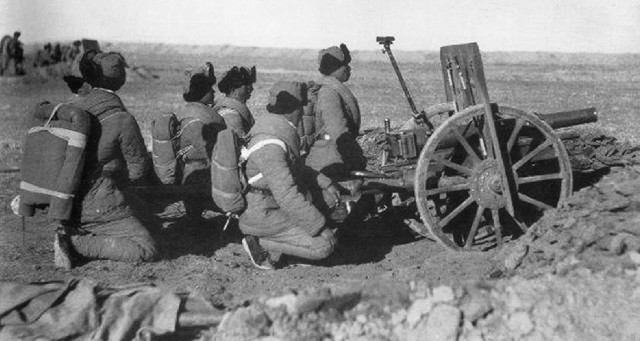
- Chinese field gun crew at Bailingmiao
Date	20 October – 19 December 1936 (1 month, 4 weeks and 1 day)
Location	Suiyuan, Inner Mongolia, China
Result	Chinese victory

Belligerents
(Republic of China (1912–1949)) China	Japan; Mongol Military Government; Grand Han Righteous Army

Commanders and leaders
Fu Zuoyi; Tang Enbo; Zhao Chengshou; Wang Jingguo; Li Fuying	Ryūkichi Tanaka; Demchugdongrub; Li Shouxin; Bao Yueqing; Wang Ying

Units involved
35th Army; 19th Army; Anti-aircraft battalion; Cavalry army; Reserve army	Inner Mongolian Army; Grand Han Righteous Army

Strength
45,000 men	10,000 men 6,000 men ~30 advisers, motor vehicles, and 28 aircraft Total: ~16,000 men

Casualties and losses
Unknown (300+ casualties in the capture of Bailing Temple)	300–900 Inner Mongolians killed, 300 wounded, and 300 captured Most of Wang Ying's forces eliminated At least 1 Japanese adviser killed, 4 planes destroyed

The Suiyuan campaign (Chinese: 綏遠抗戰; pinyin: Suīyuǎn kàngzhàn; Japanese: 綏遠事件, romanized: Suien jiken) was an attempt by the Inner Mongolian Army and Grand Han Righteous Army, two forces founded and supported by the Empire of Japan, to take control of the Suiyuan province from the Republic of China. The attempted invasion occurred in 1936, shortly before the Second Sino-Japanese War. The Japanese government denied taking part in the operation, but the Inner Mongolians and the other collaborationist Chinese troops received air support from Japanese planes and were assisted by the Imperial Japanese Army. The entire operation was overseen by Japanese staff officers. The campaign was unsuccessful, mostly due to lack of training and low morale among the Mongolians and other collaborators. The defense of Suiyuan, one of the first major successes of China's National Revolutionary Army over Japanese-supported forces, greatly improved Chinese morale.

== Background ==
The Empire of Japan had been pursuing its expansionist ambitions in China since the late 19th century, and the situation began escalating in the early 1930s. In September 1931, the Mukden Incident resulted in the Japanese Kwantung Army completely occupying the three northeastern provinces of China and defeating the forces of the pro-Nationalist warlord who had ruled the region, the "Young Marshal" Zhang Xueliang. The Kwantung Army later took part in establishing the Japanese puppet state of Manchukuo in 1932 under the rule of the last Qing emperor, Puyi. Shortly after that the three eastern Mongolian leagues–ancient regions of Inner Mongolia–were occupied and annexed into fledgling state of Manchukuo. The hostilities in the Manchuria region between the Republic of China and Japan ended in May 1933 with the signing of the Tanggu Truce. However, due to the lingering Japanese territorial ambitions and Chinese public opinion being against the harsh terms of the agreement, it was only a temporary respite.

=== Mongolian military government ===
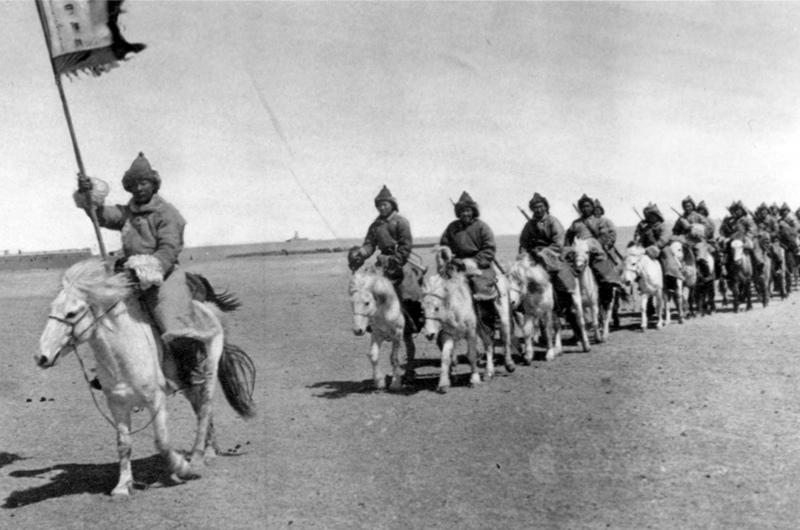
An Inner Mongolian cavalry unit of Prince De's personal guard, 1935

The idea of using the Inner Mongolia region as a buffer state against China and Russia had been considered by Japanese government circles since the early 20th century. Throughout the 1930s the Japanese Kwantung Army wanted to use the Mongols as a method of obstructing the Chinese government's control over northern China. In 1929, they made contact with Prince Demchugdongrub (De Wang), an Inner Mongolian nobleman and nationalist leader who wanted more autonomy from the Kuomintang government in Nanjing. The Japanese knew of his ambitions to create an independent Mongolian state and wanted to use him for their own purpose, while the Prince considered allying them in order to obtain weapons and training for his Mongolian Army. In 1933, the Kwantung Army made the project to win over the Mongolian nobility to their side a priority. The Japanese took advantage of the disputes for increased autonomy between the Mongolians and the Nanjing government to bring Prince De Wang to their side with promises of providing weapons and helping him take over Inner Mongolia. In 1934, they occupied several Mongolian leagues and armed the Mongol army of the warlord Li Shouxin as part of this plan.

In October of the following year, Prince De Wang met with Japanese military commanders in Xinjing and came to an agreement regarding Japan–Mongolia cooperation. The Japanese promised him military and financial assistance to take over Inner Mongolia and eventually create a Mongolian state. In February 1936 he proclaimed the creation of the Mongol Military Government during a grandiose ceremony. The new government adopted the birthday of Genghis Khan as its calendar, and Prince De swore "to recover the original land of the Mongols, and to complete the great mission of national revival." The new state only controlled the northern Chahar province initially, but plans were soon made to expand into the neighboring Suiyuan province.

=== Preparations ===
Japanese intelligence operatives had been working in Suiyuan for several months to lay the ground work for the coming invasion. Meanwhile, an Inner Mongolian Army was created out of the forces loyal to Prince Demchugdongrub and other Mongolian nobles that supported him, along with other Chinese collaborators. The main force of the Mongolian Army was about 10,000 strong, divided into eight divisions, though they were poorly armed. Li Shouxin's Mongol detachment from the Manchukuo Imperial Army, which was attached to Prince De's command, was relatively well armed and decently trained. In addition, a warlord hired by the Kwantung Army named Wang Ying had formed his own collaborationist force called the Grand Han Righteous Army, consisting of about 6,000 men. The latter was also attached to the Mongolian Army for the operation but consisted of hastily recruited bandits who were of low quality. Disunity and the lack of training among this exotic force damaged their morale. The Japanese provided them with weapons and tried to prepare them somewhat for the Suiyuan operation to make up for their lack of adequate training. However, they also sent groups of advisers embedded in each collaborator unit, along with artillery, aircraft, and armored cars to assist their Mongolian allies.

The Chinese National Revolutionary Army garrison in the Suiyuan province was reinforced by troops sent from Nanjing by the Kuomintang government, including an elite anti-aircraft battalion. This resulted in four Japanese planes being shot down during raids prior to the beginning of the campaign.

== Order of battle ==
The Japanese-backed forces which entered the region included the Inner Mongolian Army of about 10,000 men and the Grand Han Righteous Army, which was about 6,000 strong. These troops were supported by an unknown number of Japanese "advisers" with small groups of them being embedded in each collaborationist unit. They were opposed by the Chinese Nationalist 35th and 19th Army, as well as some local forces, which in total numbered about 45,000 men.

== Operations ==
The invasion began in October 1936, with the main force consisting of Prince De Wang's and Wang Ying's troops, while Li Shouxin and his detachment remained in reserve. The first contact between Nationalist and Inner Mongolian forces occurred at the town of Hongort on 14 November. A large attack was launched by the Mongolians the next day, but they were repulsed. Over the next couple of days they continued to launch assaults against the city's walls, but were beaten back and sustained considerable casualties. The Mongolian troops did not lack courage but were not adequately trained for that kind of assault. A final attack was attempted on 16 November during a snowstorm but it was also beaten back by the Chinese defenders.

On 17 November, a Chinese counterattack surprised the invaders and led to a disorganized retreat back to their headquarters at Bailingmiao, where the Mongolians tried to regroup. Taking advantage of the Mongolian disorder, General Fu Zuoyi's 35th Army made a flanking movement to the west of the Mongolian headquarters at Bailingmiao and later attacked it. The Chinese first launched suicide attacks until the city gates were broken through with some trucks. They then proceeded to drive the defending Inner Mongolian 7th Cavalry Division from Bailingmiao, giving them heavy casualties. The Mongols lost three hundred to nine hundred killed, three hundred wounded, and three hundred captured. A large amount of supplies also fell into Nationalist hands, including bags of flour, cans of petrol, rifles, machine guns, motor vehicles and field guns. The vehicles and artillery pieces were later presented as evidence of Japan's involvement in the operation.

Although that marked the end of the Mongolian Army's invasion, small-scale fighting continued in Suiyuan over the next several months until the beginning of open hostilities resulting from the Marco Polo Bridge Incident of July 1937.

== Aftermath ==
The defeat of Japan’s proxy forces encouraged many Chinese into pushing for a more active resistance against the Japanese. The victory in Suiyuan was celebrated across China and shocked the international press, being the first time that the Chinese army stopped a Japanese force. Delegations arrived from as far away as the southern Chinese provinces to urge the defenders to keep fighting. Captured Japanese weapons and equipment were used by the Chinese as evidence of Japan's involvement in the operation, although Hachirō Arita, the foreign minister of Japan, stated that "Japan was not involved in this conflict in Suiyuan at all." The Xi'an Incident, which resulted in the Kuomintang (the Nationalists) and the Chinese Communist Party recognizing the greater threat of Japan and agreeing to work together to fight the Japanese, was thought to be partly influenced by the events of the Suiyuan campaign.

Following his defeat there, Prince Demchugdongrub and his Inner Mongolian troops retreated to northern Chahar, where he was forced to rebuild his army due to the considerable losses it had sustained. New regulations were made for the Mongolian Army by the Japanese to improve its performance and the recruitment of new soldiers had begun. However, small-scale combat still continued in the Suiyuan province until the beginning of open hostilities as a result of the Marco Polo Bridge Incident the following year. Prince De's Inner Mongolian army was rebuilt with Japanese assistance and by the time war broke out in July 1937, his force consisted of 20,000 men in eight cavalry divisions. These troops participated in Operation Chahar and the Battle of Taiyuan during which Japanese regular and allied Inner Mongol forces finally captured eastern Suiyuan province.

The area was also visited by the Chinese photographer Fang Dazeng during that time, who took pictures of the warzone. His photos mostly covered the Suiyuan campaign and are now in the National Museum of China.

== See also ==
- Actions in Inner Mongolia (1933–36)
