= Chen Changjie =

Chen Changjie may refer to:

- Chen Changjie (general) (1892–1968), KMT general from Fujian
- Chen Changjie (badminton) (born 1959), former badminton player from China
