= Fu Dongju =

Chinese journalist (1924–2007)

- 傅東菊

Member of the National Committee of the Chinese People's Political Consultative Conference

Personal details
- Born: December 30, 1924 Taiyuan, Shanxi Province, Republic of China
- Died: July 2, 2007 (aged 82) Beijing, People's Republic of China
- Party: Chinese Communist Party
- Spouse: Zhou Yizhi
- Parent(s): Fu Zuoyi, Zhang Jinqiang
- Education: Chongqing Nankai Secondary School, National Southwestern Associated University

Fu Dongju (December 20, 1924 - July 2, 2007), also known as Fu Dong, was a reporter and a newspaper editor for People's Daily and was later a member of the National Committee of the Chinese People's Political Consultative Conference. She was the eldest daughter of Fu Zuoyi and Zhang Jinqiang and was the big sister of Fu Xiju and Fu Ruiyuan.

== Early life ==
Fu Dongju was born in Taiyuan, Shanxi Province, on 30 December 1924. In 1941, when she was attending Chongqing Nankai Secondary School, she joined the peripheral organization "the horn society" under the leadership of the southern bureau of the Central Committee of the Chinese Communist Party (CCP), whose members were mostly children of senior officials of the Kuomintang. She used her position to hand over confidential information about the Kuomintang and Chiang Kai-shek to Zhou Enlai from the CCP.

In 1942, after graduating from high school, she entered the National Southwestern Associated University in Kunming with a major in English. Long Yun, who ruled Yunnan at the time, was more liberal, allowing the CCP and various other democratic parties to operate, allowing her to participate in the student movement during her college years and became a member of the CCP Underground Organization. In December 1945, she joined the Democratic Youth League, a peripheral organization of the CCP in Kunming.

== Career ==
On 15 November 1947, she secretly joined the CCP while in Tianjin. During the spring of 1948, under the leadership of the CCP and Nie Rongzhen, work for the peaceful liberation of Beijing began, organised by the central bureau of the CCP under Chairman Liu Ren (born 1909). In the autumn of 1948, during the Liaoshen campaign, Liu Ren sent cadres to Tianjin to have a meeting in secret with Fu Dong to convey the instructions of the CCP, asking her to do the work of her father Fu Zuoyi, and she went to Beijing. In November 1948, Liu Ren, in accordance with Nie Rongzhen's instructions, asked Yu Diqing, secretary of the student work committee of the CCP's Beijing underground party, to move Fu Dong to Fu Zuoyi's side as soon as possible so as to keep abreast of Fu's situation. Duan Yongxuan instructed Yu Diqing to negotiate with Fu Zuoyi on behalf of the CCP. Yu Diqing searched for Fu Dong, who was staying at her father's apartment in Zhongnanhai.

During the Pingjin campaign, Fu Zuoyi was surrounded by many underground CCP members, including his secretary, major general Yan Youwen, Wang Kejun, Zhong Beifeng and others. They worked with Fu Zuoyi through Liu Houtong, Du Renzhi, and others that had ties with him to persuade him to leave Chiang Kai-shek's camp and have talks with the CCP. Due to this, the CCP did not need Fu Dong to provide specific military information, but hoping that she could persuade her father to talk to the CCP.

Fu Dong facilitated the secret talks between the Communists and her father in an effort to obtain his surrender.

At the time, Fu Dong reported to Cui Yueli, an underground member of the CCP, every two days on her father's mood changes, and sent them to the front-line headquarters of the People's Liberation Army through radio. Her job was to tell the CCP of her father's ideas and demands, and then to tell her father about the CCP's ideas and decisions, playing the role of the middleman. Fu Zouyi's concerns at that time were fear and sorry for his subordinates and friends, surrendering to the CCP, and worrying about the future arrangements of his troops, especially cadres. After several negotiations, on 21 January 1949, Xiaojun returned to Beijing, Wang Kejun, Director of the Political Department of Beijing, on behalf of Fu Zuojun, officially wrote the "Peaceful Solution to the Beijing problem", and on 31 January the Chinese People's Liberation Army entered Beijing. Throughout the Pingjin campaign, Fu Dong was always by her father's side. In his memoirs, he expressed his great appreciation for Fu Dong's role in the war.

After the Peaceful Liberation of Beijing, Fu Dong went to Tianjin and joined the Progress Daily newspaper as an editor, using the pen name "Fu dong". after Progress Daily was suspended, Fu Dong joined the southwest service corps of the Second Field Army of the Chinese People's Liberation army in August 1949, and went on foot with the troops from Hunan to Kunming, Yunnan Province, where she later worked. in August 1949, she participated in the founding of the Yunnan Daily newspaper. In 1951, during the Korean War, Chen Geng sent her back to Beijing, and when Shuai Mengqi left her in the People's Daily newspaper when she saw that she was not healthy. In March 1951, she was transferred to the press department and the literature and art department. In 1952, she married Zhou Yizhi, the Chief Correspondent of the Hong Kong bureau of People's Daily.

== Later life ==
Fu Dong was not affected by the Cultural Revolution. From 1982 to 1995, she was seconded to Xinhua News Agency's Hong Kong bureau as deputy director of the Editorial Department, and she used her special status to contact the descendants of many senior Kuomintang generals to brief them on the changes that have taken place since China's reform and opening-up. in 1995, she left the people's daily. Fu Dong was a member of the 8th, 9th and 10th CPCC national committees. On 23 April 1997, Yizhi died from a heart attack.

Fu Dong's home was located in Chongwenmen, Beijing, where she lived with her unmarried brother Fu Ruiyan. the house is decorated by the public. Fu Dong suffered from a variety of diseases and illnesses in her later years, but due to the fact that she was a retired cadre, medical expenses were fully reimbursed in accordance with the provisions of the state.

== Death ==
Fu Dongju died on 2 July 2007, in Beijing.
