= Hao Mengling =

Chinese general (1892–1937)

Hao Mengling 郝夢齡
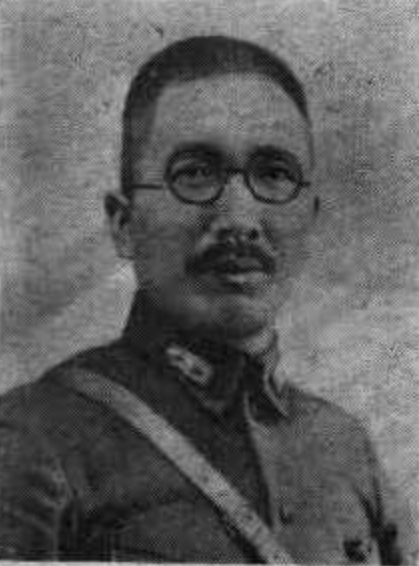
- Born: 18 February 1892; Gaocheng County, Hebei
- Died: October 15, 1937 (aged 45) Xinkou, Hebei
- Allegiance: Republic of China
- Service years: 1921 – 1937
- Rank: General
- Commands: 2nd Division; 9th Army
- Conflicts: Northern Expedition; Central Plains War; Second Sino-Japanese War; Battle of Xinkou

Hao Mengling
- Traditional Chinese: 郝夢齡
- Simplified Chinese: 郝梦龄
Transcriptions

Hao Mengling (18 February 1892 – 15 October 1937) was a Chinese general who distinguished himself first in the Northern Expedition and then in the Battle of Xinkou.

== Early life ==
Born on 18 February 1892 into a family of poor farmers, Hao ran away from his apprenticeship at a grocery shop to join the army when he was just a child. After he graduated from Baoding Military Academy, he joined Feng Yuxiang' Guominjun along with his mentor Wei Yisan (魏益三) in 1921. In 1926, he participated in the Northern Expedition as commanding officer of 26th Bde 4th Army, and his outstanding command earned him a promotion to CO of 2nd Division and then 54th Division. After the Central Plains War he was promoted to CO of 9th Army.

== Career ==
Hao relinquished his command in 1937 after battling communist forces for decades, but returned after the Marco Polo Bridge Incident. By the time he got back to the front line from Sichuan, the IJA had already broken through Yanmen Pass and were converging on Xinkou. Under Wei Lihuang's 14th Army Group, Hao led his 9th Army and Shanxi clique's 19th, 35th and 61st Armies in the defense of Xinkou.
