= Battle of Kalgan =

1946 battle

- Part of the Chinese Civil War
| Date | October 10, 1946 – October 20, 1946 |
| Location | Zhangjiakou (Kalgan), China |
| Result | Nationalist victory |

Belligerents
| Flag of the National Revolutionary Army National Revolutionary Army | PLA Chinese Red Army |

Commanders and leaders
| Fu Zuoyi | He Long; Nie Rongzhen |

Strength
| 3 corps 4 divisions 1 brigade | 14 brigades |

Casualties and losses
| 12,000 | 100,000 losses |

The Battle of Kalgan took place during the off and on mediation of a cease fire between the Kuomintang and the Chinese Communist Party by George Marshall. It was fought in the renamed city of Zhangjiakou, China.

== Prelude ==
Around September 1946, Chiang Kai-shek was prepared to propose another cease fire agreement, as the Nationalist armies were within Kalgan, with the Communists to George Marshall, as long as the Communists agreed to the proposal of the National Assembly. Zhou Enlai responded that the cease fire must occur at once. According to Zhou, if Kalgan falls into the Nationalist hands, there would be a "total national split." Marshall told Chiang that if the attack was called off, Mao Zedong would consider the cease fire and that the Communists would also be willing to join the National Assembly or the coalition of Nationalist and Communist troops.

Chiang knew the strategic location of Kalgan as the "gateway" for both armies movement in and out of northeast China. Its importance was that it helped secure the area south of the Great Wall.

Marshall rejected the idea of the attack on Kalgan and threatened to send a message to President Truman to have himself recalled back to the US. On October 4, Chiang tried to persuade to Marshall that he always have treated him very well and not to leave. Upon hearing that Marshall had indeed sent a radiogram to Washington D.C., Chiang proposed a ten-day truce. Marshall rescinded his decision and stayed.

With a diplomatic package, proposing Communist delegates to the National Assembly and the amalgamation of the Communist armies into the Nationalist armies as suggested by Chiang, and agreed upon by Marshall and Ambassador John Stuart, Zhou rejected it, saying that it was as equivalent to ask the Communists to surrender. Zhou sent a plan to Marshall, which he became "more impatient with Zhou than at any time during the year." Marshall told Zhou that there were no other reason to continue on with the talks.

== Battle ==
On October 10, 1946, General Fu Zuoyi attacked the city of Kalgan. The battle lasted to October 20.

== Outcome ==
Of the 150,000 inhabitants, 50,000 fled with the remnants of the Communist armies. The model city of the Communists was "lies gutted and ghost-like." The retreating Communist army demolished or set fire to parts of the city. Three weeks after the battle, the city was still without running water, electricity, and lines of communication. They also destroyed 52 factories located in the city which "[deprived] families of 3,000 workers of their livelihood." According to TIME coorespondant, Frederick Gruin, the destruction of the city may have been a political mistake and may also have "undermined their own guerrilla potential."

The Communist army lost about 100,000 soldiers in the defense. The Communist armies in northeast China were also cut off from Yan'an.

== See also ==
- Outline of the Chinese Civil War
- National Revolutionary Army
- History of the People's Liberation Army
