= Niangzi Pass =

Mountain pass west of Shijiazhuang, Hebei Province in North China

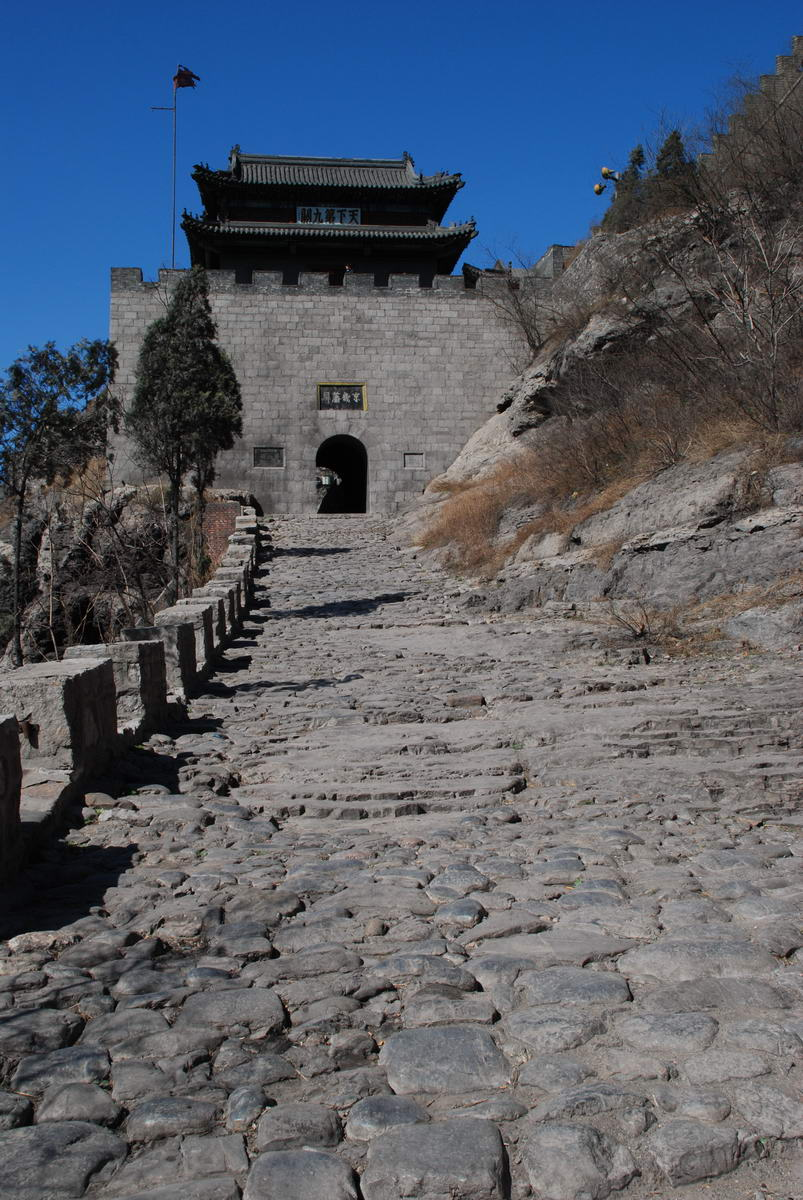
- The Great Wall at Niangzi Pass

- Location within Northern China Location within China
- Traversed by: Shijiazhuang–Taiyuan railway, Shanxi Provincial Road S315

Location
- Location: Border between Shanxi and Hebei provinces
- Range: Taihang Mountains
- Coordinates: 37°58′01.34″N 113°52′40.65″E

Chinese name
- Traditional Chinese: 娘子關
- Simplified Chinese: 娘子关
Transcriptions
Standard Mandarin
- Hanyu Pinyin: Niángzǐ Guān

Niangzi Pass (simplified Chinese: 娘子关; traditional Chinese: 娘子關; pinyin: Niángzǐ Guān) – also called the Ladies' Pass, Women's Pass, or the Ninth Pass – is a mountain pass in Shanxi.

== Geography ==
The pass is located on a cliff of Mount Mian, and part of the Taihang Mountains. It is 55 kilometres (34 mi) west of the capital of Hebei and 45 kilometres (28 mi) northeast of Pingding County. It is 1 kilometre (0.62 mi) from the Niangziguan train station, and 6 kilometres (3.7 mi) north of the old site of the Guguan Pass. It extends 250 metres (820 ft) north to south and approximately 100 metres (330 ft) east to west, with the Yanzhi Mountains to the north.

The Tao River, a tributary of the Yellow River, winds through the surrounding valleys. This natural geography created a defensible passage. Several waterfalls exist in the pass.

== History ==
Niangzi Pass was once known as the Weize Pass, and is also known as the "Ninth Pass Under Heaven". The name was changed to the Nangzi, or Women's, Pass in honor of the army of 70,000 soldiers led by Princess Pingyang, daughter of Li Yuan, who was said to have defended the pass during her father's revolt against the Sui dynasty. There are many areas of the pass which are believed to have ties to Pingyang.

At one time, the pass was divided into an eastern, or upper, pass and a western, or lower, pass, before being rebuilt during the Ming dynasty. Two gates were constructed at that time, with the eastern one using brick and the southern one using limestone. The fort remaining on the site was built in 1542. Signs on the gates signify the location and purpose of the fort. At some point between 1980 and 1995, the structure atop the arch was rebuilt, replacing the brick with stone and remodeling the watchtower, adding more levels and the flying eaves.

In April 1901, during the Boxer Rebellion, both the Niangzi and the Guguan Passes were attacked by armed forces consisting of Chinese Christians as well as French and German soldiers. Initial reports indicated the capture of the Niangzi pass, but later reports stated that Chinese forces in Shanxi routed the invaders, killing between seven and eight thousand foreign combatants.

In the Railway Protection Movement, the combined Tibetan and Guanxian forces defeated the Qing army at the Niangzi Pass before proceeding to Weizhou which enabled them to prevent the reinforcements called in by Zhao Erfeng from ending the siege of Chengdu during the 1911 Revolution. Later, after the anti-Qing forces captured Taiyuan on 28 October 1911, the Qing army marched to the pass, making their way through in mid-December to retake the Shanxi capital.

During the Second Sino-Japanese War, the Eighth Route Army planned the demolition of the Shijiazhuang-Taiyuan railway, with forces stationed in the Taihang Mountains attacking the section between the pass and Taigu District, and forces stationed in the Wutai Mountain range attacking the section between the pass and Shijiazhuang. In October 1937, during the Battle of Xinkou between the Chinese Nationalists and the Japanese detachment, the Japanese Twentieth Division captured a town before Zhu De, charged with defending the pass, was able to intercept the enemy troops. The battle for the pass lasted twenty days, ending with heavy losses for the Chinese and the Japanese taking control of the pass on 26 October 1937.

During the late 1980s, the provincial government of Shanxi established a post at Nangzi Pass to collect fees from any coal truck leaving the province, which prompted Hebei's provincial government to ban the entry of all coal trucks and caused a local energy crisis while crippling Shanxi economically.
