= Wang Ying (Republic of China period) =

Chinese warlord (1895–1950)

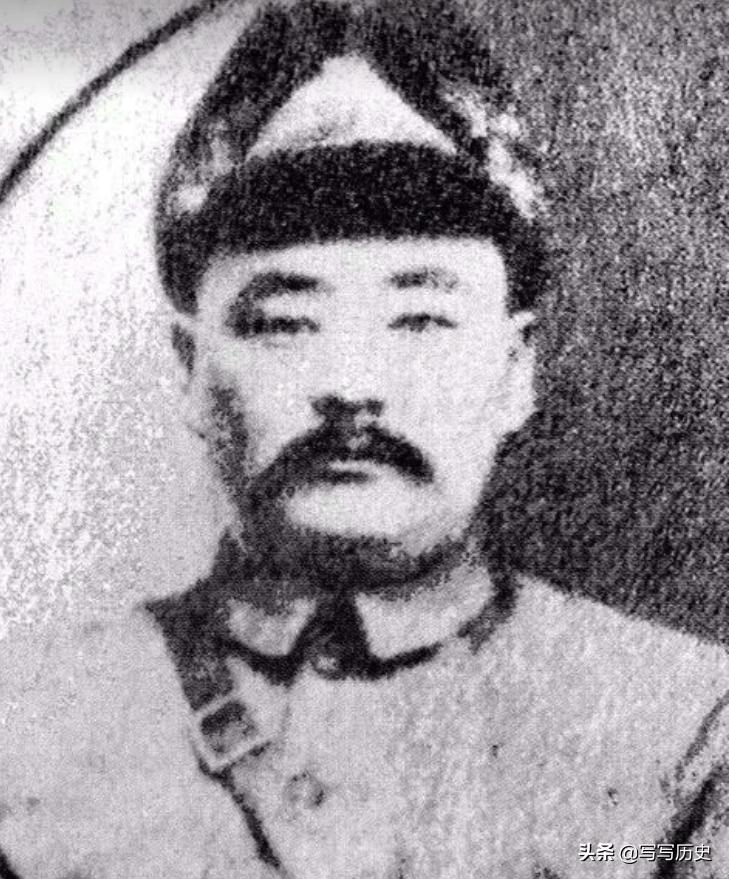
- Born: 1895; Qing dynasty
- Died: November 4, 1950 (aged 55); Beijing, People's Republic of China
- Cause of death: Execution by firing squad
- Military career
- Allegiance: (Republic of China (1912–1949)) China; Manchukuo; Mengjiang; Republic of China

Wang Ying (Chinese: 王英; pinyin: Wáng Yīng; 1895 – November 4, 1950) was a Chinese warlord from western Suiyuan, and later a Japanese collaborator. He was involved in the Chahar People's Anti-Japanese Army in 1933, commanding a formation called the 1st Route. Following the suppression of the Anti-Japan Allied Army, Wang Ying went over to the Japanese Kwantung Army and persuaded them to let him recruit unemployed Chinese soldiers in Chahar Province. He returned to Japanese-occupied Northern Chahar with enough men to form two Divisions that were trained by Japanese advisors. By 1936 Wang was commander of this Grand Han Righteous Army attached to the Inner Mongolian Army of Teh Wang.

Following the failure of their first Suiyuan campaign, the Japanese used the Grand Han Righteous Army to launch another attempt to take eastern Suiyuan in January 1937. Fu Zuoyi routed Wang’s army, and it suffered heavy losses.

After 1937 he was able to establish a small puppet army, independent of Mengjiang, in Western Suiyuan under Japanese protection. His Self Government Army of Western Suiyuan in 1943 consisted of over 2300 men in three divisions, in a March 1943 British intelligence report.

After the Surrender of Japan, Wang Ying surrendered to Fu Zuoyi, and switched sides again; he was then appointed Commander of the 1st Cavalry Group. He was then made Commander of the 14th Cavalry Column, the 12th War Area. In 1946 he was appointed senior staff officer of the Beiping Camp for the Chairperson of the Military Committee (軍事委員會委員長北平行營高級參謀). After that, he held the Supreme Commander of the Military for Subjugation Communists, the Route of Ping-Pu (平蒲路剿共軍総司令).

After the establishment of the People's Republic of China, Wang Ying was arrested. He was convicted of treason and anti-revolution and sentenced to death by the Beijing People's Court on May 23, 1950. He appealed to the Supreme People's Court, but the court affirmed the original judgement. He was executed by firing squad in Beijing on November 4, 1950.

== See also ==
- Hanjian
- Second Sino-Japanese War

== Sources ==
- Jowett, Phillip S., Rays of The Rising Sun, Armed Forces of Japan’s Asian Allies 1931-45, Volume I: China & Manchuria, 2004. Helion & Co. Ltd., 26 Willow Rd., Solihull, West Midlands, England.
- International Military Tribunal for the Far East, Chapter 5: Japanese Aggression Against China
- 中国抗日战争正面战场作战记 (China's Anti-Japanese War Combat Operations)
  - Guo Rugui, editor-in-chief Huang Yuzhang
  - Jiangsu People's Publishing House
  - Date published : 2005-7-1
  - ISBN 7-214-03034-9
  - Online in Chinese: http://www.wehoo.net/book/wlwh/a30012/A0170.htm
- Xu Youchun (徐友春) (main ed.) (2007). Unabridged Biographical Dictionary of the Republic, Revised and Enlarged Version (民国人物大辞典 增订版). Hebei People's Press (Hebei Renmin Chubanshe; 河北人民出版社). ISBN 978-7-202-03014-1.
- Li Taifen (李泰棻) (1961). History of Wang Ying's Vice (王英罪恶史). Chinese Literature and History Press. from the Special Edition of Literary&Historical Materials Vol.15 (文史资料选辑 第15辑)
