= Hongort =

Town in Ulanqab, Inner Mongolia, China

Coordinates: 41.6965°N 113.1450°E

Hongort (Mongolian: хонгор, lit. 'soft, or sweetheart', Chinese: 红格尔图; pinyin: Hongge'ertu; Wade–Giles: Hung-ko-erh-t'u) is a town (镇) of the Chahar Right Back Banner, which in turn is part of Ulanqab prefecture-level city in Inner Mongolia, China. It is located about 30 km northwest of Shangdu county. In 2000, when it was still classified as township (乡), it had 11,860 inhabitants.

In 1936, Hongort was the site of a battle between Chinese and pro-Japanese troops in the Suiyuan Campaign.
