= Pingjin campaign =

Campaign of the Chinese Civil War

- Part of the Chinese Civil War
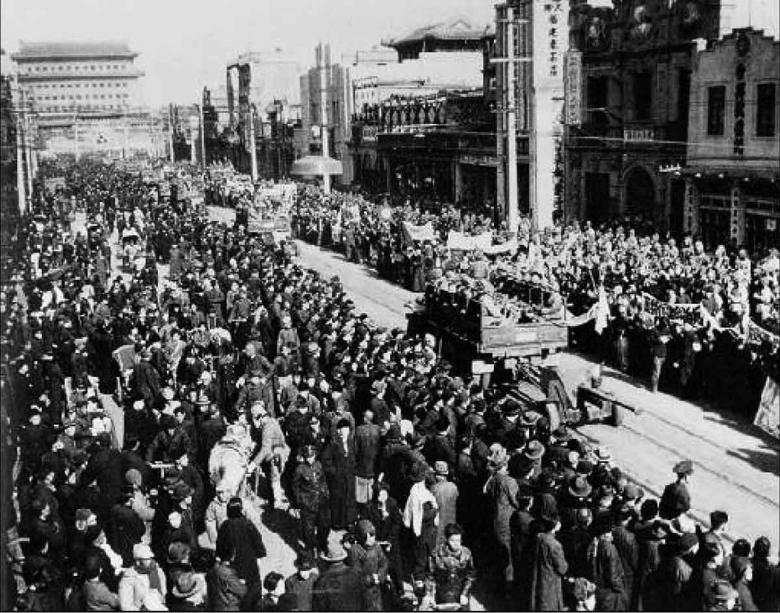
- People's Liberation Army enters Beiping
Date	29 November 1948 – 31 January 1949 (2 months and 2 days)
Location	Hebei province, China
Result	Communist victory
Territorial changes	Surrender of Beiping, Tianjin and vast areas of North China Plain to the Communists

Belligerents
(Republic of China (1912–1949)) Republic of China: (Republic of China (1912–1949)) Republic of China Army	Communist Party: People's Liberation Army

Commanders and leaders
(Republic of China (1912–1949)) Fu Zuoyi (surrendered) (Republic of China (1912–1949)) Chen Changjie (POW) (Republic of China (1912–1949)) Guo Jingyun ‡‡	(China) Lin Biao (China) Luo Ronghuan (China) Nie Rongzhen

Strength
600,000	1,000,000

Casualties and losses
~520,000 (including non-combat losses)	39,000 (PRC sources)

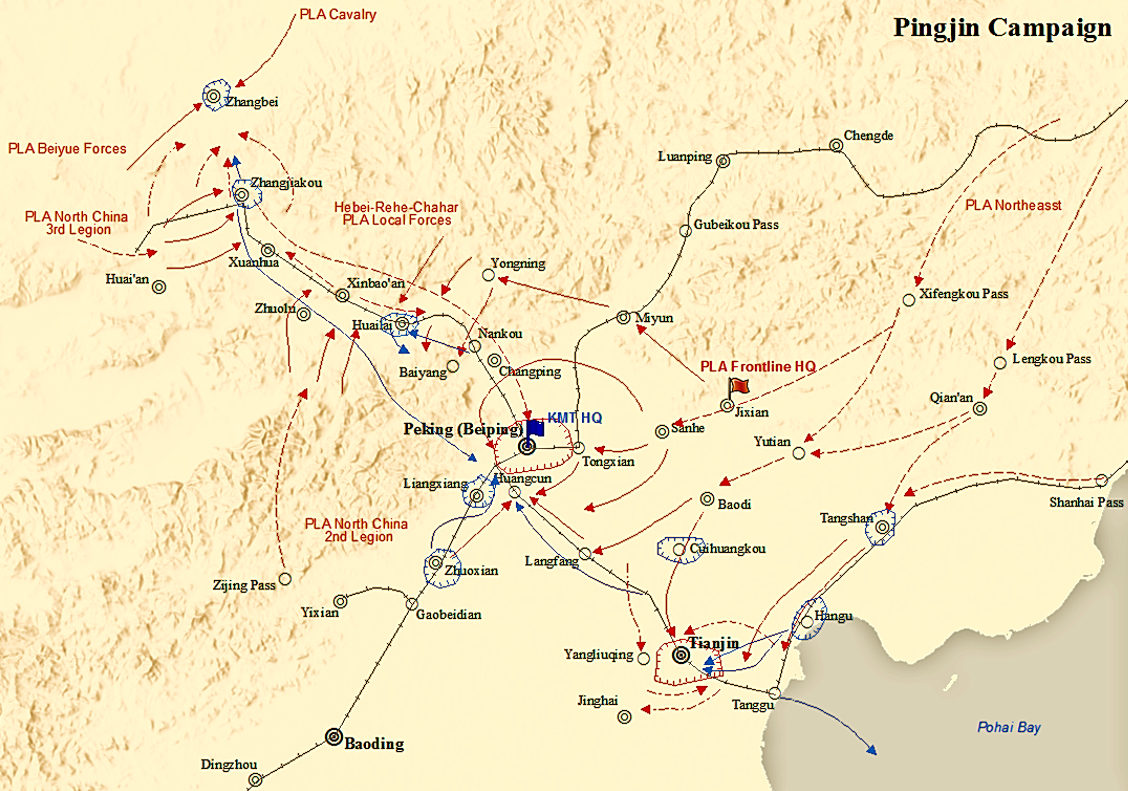
Situation of the Pingjin campaign during the Chinese Civil War

The Pingjin campaign (simplified Chinese: 平津战役; traditional Chinese: 平津戰役; pinyin: Píngjīn Zhànyì), also known as the Battle of Pingjin and also officially known in Chinese Communist historiography as the Liberation of Beijing and Tianjin was part of the three major campaigns launched by the People's Liberation Army during the late stage of the Chinese Civil War against the Government of the Republic of China. It began on 29 November 1948 and ended on 31 January 1949, lasting a total of 64 days. This campaign marked the end of Nationalist dominance in the North China Plain. The term Pingjin refers to the cities Beiping (now Beijing) and Tianjin.

== Background ==
By the winter of 1948, the balance of power in Northern China was shifting in favor of the People's Liberation Army. As the Communist Fourth Field Army led by Lin Biao and Luo Ronghuan entered the North China Plain after the conclusion of the Liaoshen campaign, Fu Zuoyi and the Nationalist government in Nanjing decided to abandon Chengde, Baoding, Shanhai Pass and Qinhuangdao collectively and withdraw the remaining Nationalist troops to Beiping, Tianjin and Zhangjiakou and consolidate the defense in these garrisons. The Nationalists were hoping to preserve their strength and reinforce Xuzhou where another major campaign was under its way, or alternatively to retreat to the nearby Suiyuan Province if necessary.

== Prelude ==
In preparations for the campaign, the People's Liberation Army halted the advance of First Field Army toward Taiyuan. The attack on Hohhot were also held back as the Third Field Army was being deployed from Jining District toward Beiping.

== Campaign ==
On 23 November 1948, Lin Biao's army gained control of Shanhaiguan and severed the Beijing-Tianjin railroad.

=== Zhangjiakou ===
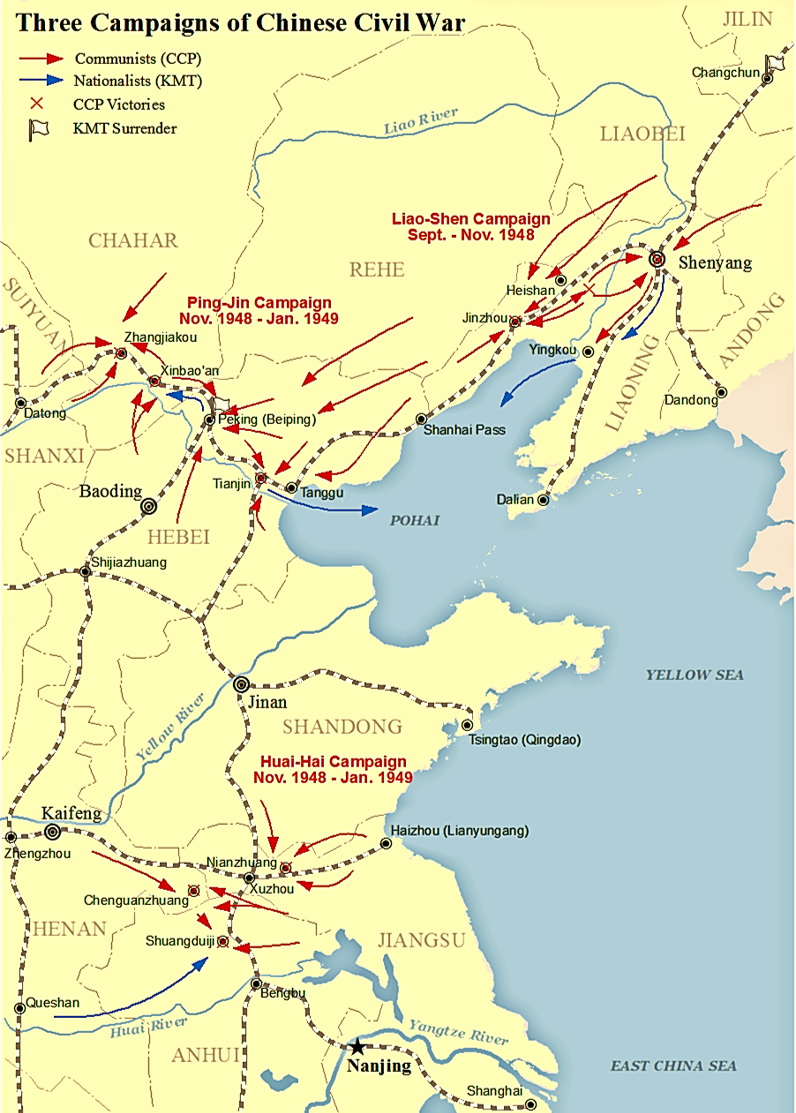
Map showing the Pingjin campaign as one of the three campaigns during the Chinese civil war

Nie Rongzhen deployed the Second Army (commanded by Yang Dezhi) and the Third Army (commanded by Yang Chengwu) to attack Zhangjiakou.

On 29 November 1948, the People's Liberation Army launched an assault on Zhangjiakou. Fu Zuoyi ordered the Nationalist 35th Corps in Beiping relieve the city. On 2 December, the PLA Second Field Army began to approach Zhuolu. The PLA Fourth Field Army captured Miyun on 5 December and advanced toward Huailai. Meanwhile, the Second Field Army advanced to the south of Zhuolu. As Beiping was at risk of being encircled, Fu recalled both the 35th Army and the 104th Army from Zhangjiakou to return and support the defense of Beiping before being "surrounded and destroyed" by the PLA.

=== Xinbao'an ===
The Third Army trapped the 35th Corps at Xinbao'an. Nationalist reinforcements from Beiping were intercepted by the Communist forces and were unable to reach the city.

Fu Zuoyi ordered the Nationalist forces to stay in place, believing that other Communists forces were far away. In fact, most of Lin Biao's army had already reached its planned positions on 12 December.

The Communists had surrounded and isolated the major strong points of the Nationalist defenses. The Communists began secret talks with Fu in an effort to convince him to surrender. His daughter Fu Dong, an underground member of the Communist party, facilitated the talks. On 19 December, the talks reached impasse.

The PLA then launched an assault against the city on 21 December and captured the city the next evening. Commander of the 35th Corps Guo Jingyun committed suicide as the Communist forces broke into the city, and remaining Nationalist forces were destroyed as they attempted to retreat back to Zhangjiakou.

=== Tianjin ===
After capturing both Zhangjiakou and Xinbao'an, the PLA began to amass troops around the Tianjin area beginning on 2 January 1949. Immediately after the conclusion of Huaihai campaign in the south, the PLA launched the final assault on Tianjin on 14 January. After 29 hours of fighting, the Nationalist 62nd Army and 86th Army and a total of 130,000 men in ten divisions were either killed or captured, including the Nationalist commander Chen Changjie. Remainder of the Nationalist troops from the 17th Army Group and the 87th Army that participated in the battle retreated south on 17 January by sea.

== Surrender of Beiping ==
After the fall of Tianjin to the Communist forces, the Nationalist garrison in Beiping was effectively isolated. Fu Zuoyi came to the decision to negotiate a peace settlement on 21 January. On 22 January, Fu left the city. His army was integrated into the Communist forces. On 31 January, the PLA's Fourth Field Army entered Beiping to take over the city which marked the conclusion of the campaign.

The KMT's defeat in the Pingjin campaign ended its ability to be an effective fighting force on the mainland.

== Popular culture ==
The Chinese drama, New World (新世界) is set inside besieged Beiping.

== See also ==
- Outline of the Chinese Civil War
