= Grand Han Righteous Army =

Military unit

- 大漢義軍
- Active: 1936
- Countries: Republic of China; Inner Mongolia
- Allegiance: Empire of Japan
- Role: Infantry
- Size: 6,000
- Engagements: Suiyuan campaign

Commanders
- Notable commanders: Wang Ying

The Grand Han Righteous Army (大漢義軍) was a collaborationist Chinese army cooperating with the Empire of Japan in campaigns in northern China and Inner Mongolia immediately prior to the official start of hostilities of the Second Sino-Japanese War.

== History ==
The Grand Han Righteous Army was formed by minor warlord and commander of the Chahar People's Anti-Japanese Army Wang Ying after his defeat by the Imperial Japanese Army in what now part of Inner Mongolia in 1936.

Wang defected to the Kwantung Army and persuaded the Japanese to permit him to recruit unemployed Chinese soldiers in Chahar Province to form a mercenary army with Japanese advisors. He managed to recruit approximately 6,000 men, who were trained by the Japanese and organized into four infantry brigades in Japanese-occupied northern Chahar. The troops were armed with weapons seized from Northeastern Army armories and warehouses in northern China. That force was attached another Japanese proxy army, the Inner Mongolian Army, under the overall command of Mongol prince Demchugdongrub.

During the Suiyuan campaign, the Inner Mongolian Army attacked Hongort on 15 November 1936. After several days of fighting, the attackers failed to capture the town. On 17 November, a Chinese counterattack surprised the invaders and led to a disorganized retreat. Taking advantage of the disorder among the Mongolian forces, Chinese general Fu Zuoyi made a flanking movement to the west of the Mongolian headquarters at Bailingmiao, attacked and captured it, and routed the defenders. The Japanese transported Wang and his Grand Han Righteous Army by trucks into a location near Pai-ling-miao and launched a counterattack, which failed dismally on 19 December. With the bulk of its men captured or killed, the Grand Han Righteous Army ceased to exist as an effective combat force, and the Japanese disbanded the remnants.

== Sources ==
- Jowett, Philip (2005). Rays of the Rising Sun, Volume 1: Japan's Asian Allies 1931-45, China and Manchukuo. Helion and Company Ltd. ISBN 1-874622-21-3.
- 中国抗日战争正面战场作战记 (China's Anti-Japanese War Combat Operations)
  - Guo Rugui, editor-in-chief Huang Yuzhang
  - Jiangsu People's Publishing House
  - Date published: 2005–7–1
  - ISBN 7-214-03034-9
  - Online in Chinese:
    - 日本侵绥的战备企图和中日 Japanese invasion of Suiyuan to prepare their planned union of China and Japan

== See also ==
- Mengjiang
