= Yang Aiyuan =

Chinese general (1887–1959

- 楊愛源
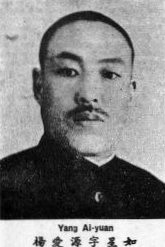
- Born: 1887; Wutai County, China
- Died: 2 January 1959 (aged 71–72); Taipei, Taiwan
- Military career
- Allegiance: Republic of China
- Branch: (Republic of China (1912–1949)) National Revolutionary Army
- Conflicts: Second Sino-Japanese War; Battle of Taiyuan; Battle of Xinkou

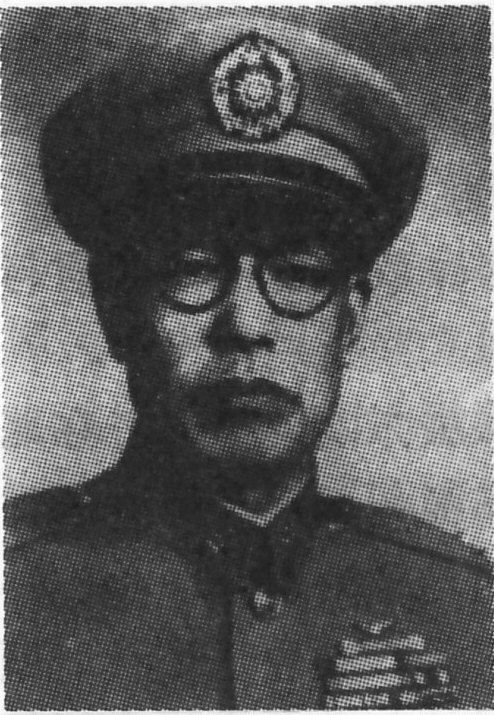
Yang Aiyuan during the Civil War

Yang Aiyuan (楊愛源) (1887 – 2 January 1959) was a KMT general from Shanxi. From 1928 to 1930, Yang was the first chairman of the government of Chahar, a newly formed province of the Republic of China. In 1937, as a general of the KMT, he played an active part in the Battle of Taiyuan and the Battle of Xinkou. He died in 1959 in Taiwan.
