= Datong–Jining Campaign =

Series of battles during Chinese Civil War

Datong-Jining Campaign
- Part of the Chinese Civil War
Date	July 31, 1946 – September 16, 1946
Location	Northern Shanxi, China
Result	Nationalist victory

Belligerents
Flag of the National Revolutionary Army National Revolutionary Army	PLA People's Liberation Army

Commanders and leaders
Fu Zuoyi; Yan Xishan	Nie Rongzhen; He Long; Zhang Zongxun; Luo Ruiqing

Strength
51,000 in 10 divisions	100,000 in 50 regiments

Casualties and losses
8,000	heavy

Datong-Jining Campaign (大同集宁战役) was a series of battles fought between the nationalists and the communists mainly in northern Shanxi and the surrounding regions during the Chinese Civil War in the post-World War II era. The main battlefield was centered on two cities, Datong and Jining.

== Prelude ==
After the Chinese Civil War had broken out in full scale on June 22, 1946, the communists had many difficulties. Zhangjiakou, the capital of the communist base in border area of Shanxi-Chahar-Hebei was sandwiched between nationalist strongholds both in the east and the west. The nationalist stronghold Datong in the west was guarded by the nationalist 38th Division, the 5th Cavalry Division, the 6th Cavalry Division and some local security forces totaling 20,000. In an attempt to eliminate the nationalist threat of Zhangjiakou, the communist decided to first take the nationalist stronghold of Datong in the west by concentrating a total of thirty regiments from nine brigades, and out of the nine brigades, five brigades were to be deployed to assault the city itself, while the remaining four brigades were deployed at regions of Zhuozi Mountain (Zhuo Zi Shan, 卓资山), Earth Castle (Tu Cheng Zi, 土城子), Merchant Capital (Shang Du, 商都) and Cool Castle (Liang Cheng, 凉城) near Jining to stop and ambush the nationalist reinforcement.

== Order of battle ==
Defenders: nationalist order of battle:

- The 38th Division
- The 5th Cavalry Division
- The 6th Cavalry Division
- A security regiment
- The 35th Army
- The Newly Organized 31st Division
- The 11th Division
- The 17th Division
- Two divisions from the 3rd Army
- 4 cavalry divisions
- The 101st Division
- Newly Organized 32nd Division
- The Newly Organized 4th Cavalry Division

Attackers: communist order of battle:

- Units from the 2nd Column of the communist Shanxi-Chahar-Hebei Military Region
- Units from the 3rd Column of the communist Shanxi-Chahar-Hebei Military Region
- Units from the 4th Column of the communist Shanxi-Chahar-Hebei Military Region
- Independent 1st Brigade of the communist Shanxi-Suiyuan Field Army
- Independent 3rd Brigade of the communist Shanxi-Suiyuan Field Army
- The 358th Brigade of the communist Shanxi-Suiyuan Field Army
- The cavalry Brigade of the communist Shanxi-Suiyuan Field Army
- Local militia units

== Campaign ==
On July 31, 1946, the communists launched their assaults on the nationalist outposts outside Datong and by August 4, 1946, the defenders withdrew behind the city wall after suffering more than 2,000 casualties. The enemy began their assault on the city itself on September 14, 1946, and by September 4, 1946, Northern Pass (Bei Guan, 北关), train station at the Western Pass (Xi Guang, 西关) in the outskirt of the city. had fallen into enemy hands. By that time, the nationalist 35th Army, two divisions of the nationalist 3rd Army, and four nationalist cavalry divisions totaling more than thirty thousand attempted to reinforce the besieged Datong by attacking communist-held Jining from Hohhot on three fronts. The communists, in turn, decided to deploy three brigades and local militia to continue the siege of Datong while the rest of force totaling more than forty thousands would be deployed to fight the nationalist reinforcement.

After taking Zhuozi Mountain (Zhuo Zi Shan, 卓资山) to the west of Jining on September 10, 1946, the nationalist the Newly Organized 31st Division, the 11th Division, and the 17th Division attempted to attack Jining from north and west under the air cover, but they were beaten back by the communists. On September 11, 1946, the communists launched a counteroffensive on the nationalist reinforcement retreating toward Crouching Dragon Mountain (Wo Long Shan, 卧龙山) and Head Bad Mountain (Nao Bao Shan, 脑包山), badly mauling the nationalist 11th Division and the 17th Division, killing more than 5,000 nationalist troops. On September 12, 1946, the nationalist 101st Division followed by the Newly Organized 32nd Division and the Newly Organized 4th Cavalry Division came to take Jining in full force. By September 13, 1946, the nationalist reinforcement reached Jining and began their attack on the city, and the communists were forced to abandon the city in the evening on the same day. By September 16, 1946, the communists withdrew their siege on Datong and the campaign concluded with nationalists suffering over 12,000 casualties and the communists suffered several thousand casualties.

== Outcome ==
For the nationalists, the campaign was a failure because although the nationalists were able to beat off enemy attacks on the two cities, majority of rural area in the region had fallen into the enemy hands, and the nationalists defenders of the two cities were isolated, which greatly drained the nationalists resources later as the nationalists attempted to re-supply the isolated cities, resulting in nationalist defense lines overly stretched. Furthermore, the nationalists were infatuated with conquering as much land as possible instead of inflicting heavy casualties on their enemy, resulting in enemy being escaped with relatively few numerical losses in comparison to that of nationalists themselves. One of such nationalist blunders made in the campaign was that in their attack on Jining, the nationalists did not besiege the city and thus the enemy defending the city were able to withdraw. However, such mistake was intentional because the nationalist commander Fu Zuoyi was not willing to sacrifice his own troops for Chiang Kai-shek and Yan Xishan. Similarly, Yan Xishan was not willing to sacrifice his own troops for Chiang and Fu Zuoyi either. As a result of lack of corporation, the enemy was able to successfully withdraw, and eventually returned with vengeance and the lessons learnt in this campaign, and the nationalists would consequently have to pay a heavy price later.

However, their enemy had suffered equally if not greater because although the communists had managed in inflicting greater number of casualties on the nationalists, they had failed to achieve their original goal of capturing Datong and Jining. The communist failure was mainly due to the grave underestimation of the enemy strength. Not only the communists had failed to achieve absolute numerical superiority, which by Mao Zedong's definition at the time, should be at least three or four times than the opposing sides, and with absolute technical inferiority as in the case of this campaign, it should even be five or six times. As a result of failing to achieve absolute numerical superiority, the communist troops with absolute technical inferiority lost in this campaign were the cream of the crop: these were the combat hardened veterans with great experiences resulted from years of fighting. Although the communists were able to later boost their strength by drafting local militia into their regular army which swelled to a much larger size than it was before the campaign, there was a fatal flaw of the newly formed communist force: those militia were only good at guerilla tactics and had no knowledge on regular warfare, and as result, both the individual fighting capability and the fighting capability as military formations of these new troops were greatly inferior than that of veterans killed in the campaign. Additionally, many if not most of these new guerrilla fighters were illiterate and could not operate modern weaponry captured from the nationalists, and since most of the combat hardened veterans with experience were killed, there were not enough trainers to train these new troops either. These factors led the communist loss of Zhangjiakou later in the Battle of Zhangjiakou, and the result this campaign is therefore classified as a stalemate at the best if not a communist defeat.

== See also ==
- Outline of the Chinese Civil War
- National Revolutionary Army
- History of the People's Liberation Army
- Chinese Civil War
