= Chen Changjie (general) =

Chinese general (1892–1968)

Chen Chanjie
- Native name: 陳長捷
- Born: 2 June 1892; Fuzhou, Fujian, Qing China
- Died: 7 April 1968 (aged 75) Shanghai, China
- Allegiance: Republic of China
- Branch: (Republic of China (1912–1949)) National Revolutionary Army
- Service years: 1911–1949
- Rank: Lieutenant General
- Commands: Commander-in-Chief of the Sixth Army and Commander of Tianjin Garrison
- Conflicts: Xinhai Revolution; Second Sino-Japanese War; Chinese Civil War; Pingjin Campaign
- Awards: Order of the Cloud and Banner

Chen Changjie (simplified Chinese: 陈长捷; traditional Chinese: 陳長捷; pinyin: Chén Chángjié; 2 June 1892 – 7 April 1968) was a National Revolutionary Army general during the Second Sino-Japanese War and the Chinese Civil War.

== Biography ==
Chen was born in Fuzhou. He participated in the Xinhai Revolution in Fujian and later joined Yan Xishan's army, which he served in during the Second Sino-Japanese War.

Chen was the garrison commander of the Nationalist army in Tianjin during the Pingjin campaign. Captured by the People's Liberation Army after the fall of Tianjin, Chen was imprisoned to undergo educational reform, reportedly being a model inmate. He was amnestied in 1959 and served in the Literature and History Research Committee of the National Committee of the Chinese People's Political Consultative Conference.

When the Cultural Revolution broke out in 1966, Chen and his wife were subject to severe harassment and persecution. On 7 April 1968, he committed suicide along with his wife. He was posthumously rehabilitated on 27 February 1979.
