= Li Shouxin =

Inner Mongolian Axis collaborationist general (1892–1970)

Li Shouxin 李守信 ᠨᠠᠰᠤᠨᠪᠠᠶᠠᠷ
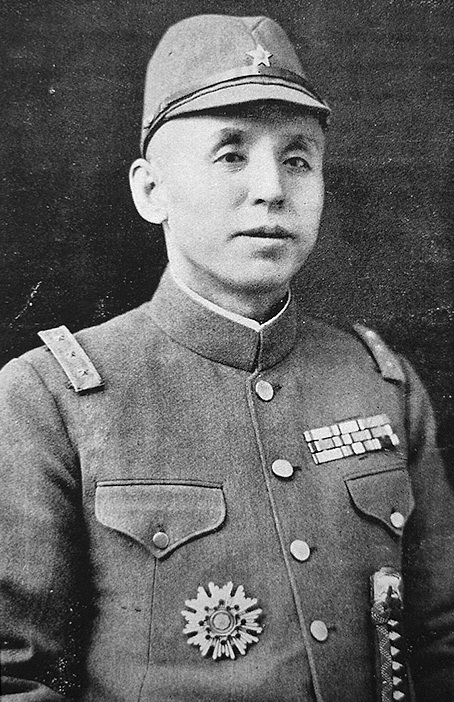

Commander of Inner Mongolian Army
- In office 1 December 1937 – 20 August 1945
- Leader: Demchugdongrub
- Preceded by: Demchugdongrub
- Succeeded by: Position abolished

Personal details
- Born: 11 July 1892 Inner Mongolia, Qing dynasty
- Died: May 1970 (aged 78) Hohot, Inner Mongolia, China
- Awards: Order of the Sacred Treasure

Military service
- Allegiance: (Republic of China (1912–1949)) China; Manchukuo; Mengjiang

Li Shouxin (Mongolian: ᠨᠠᠰᠤᠨᠪᠠᠶᠠᠷ, Насунбаяр; Chinese: 李守信; pinyin: Lǐ Shǒuxìn; Wade–Giles: Li Shou-hsin; Hepburn: Ri Shyushin; 11 July 1892 – May 1970) was a pro-Japanese commander in the Manchukuo Imperial Army and later the Mengjiang National Army.

== Biography ==
Li was born into a family of minor landlords of Han Chinese descent who assimilated into the Mongol people. His Han Chinese ancestor was part of a group of Han Chinese during the Qing dynasty called "Mongol followers" who worked as servants for Mongols and married Mongol women. Their descendants continued to marry Mongol women and changed their ethnicity to Mongol. They distinguished themselves apart from "true Mongols" (真蒙古). In 1919, he enlisted in the military forces of the Zhili clique in Rehe Province, rising steadily through the ranks until he reached the position of colonel, with an equivalent ranking being granted by the Kuomintang government. Assigned to Tongliao in what is now Inner Mongolia, he assisted in the suppressing the revolt of Gada Meiren in 1929.

In 1933, his forces clashed with the Imperial Japanese Army on the border with Manchukuo, and Li managed to down a Japanese aircraft. However, this opened the door to negotiations, and in exchange for weapons, money and supplies, Li defected to the Japanese side, and was appointed commander of a portion of Inner Mongolia and Rehe. In 1933 he commanded the Manchukuo forces defending the fortifications around Duolun against the Chahar People's Anti-Japanese Army. In late 1935 he commanded Manchukuo forces aiding Prince Demchugdongrub in seizing control of the six northern districts of Chahar. The following two years he was in command of the Manchukuo detachment of the Inner Mongolian Army attempting to capture Suiyuan province. By February 1936, Li controlled a large area in Chahar province, and transferred his allegiance to Demchugdongrub and became Chief of Staff of the new Inner Mongol Army. With the establishment Mengjiang, Li became the commander of the Mengjiang National Army.

In 1940, Li met in Qingdao with Zhou Fohai and representatives of the Wang Jingwei Government with the aim of discussing the integration of Mengjiang into China. This was accomplished in 1941, with Mengjiang becoming the Mongolian Autonomous Federation (蒙古自治邦), albeit with complete autonomy.

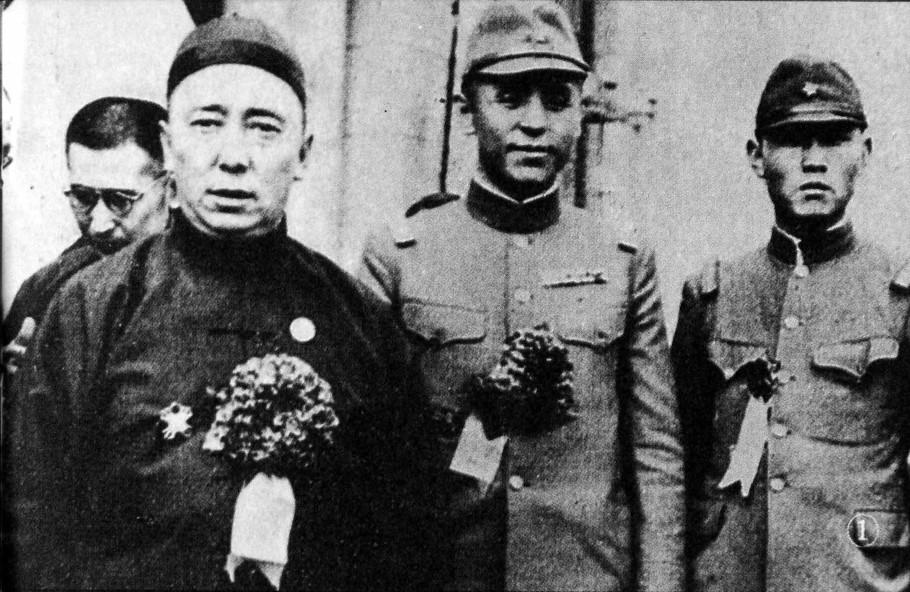
Li Shouxin (center), Prince Demchugdongrub (left)

However, as the situation deteriorated against the Empire of Japan towards the end of World War II, Li met in secret with Chiang Kai-shek, and defected back to the Kuomintang in exchange for being named general of the Chinese 10th Route Army. After the victory of the Chinese Communist Party in the Chinese Civil War in 1949, Li fled briefly into exile in Taiwan. However, at the strong request of Demchugdongrub, he returned to Inner Mongolia to assume the position of deputy director of Defense of the Inner Mongolian autonomous government. However, the People's Liberation Army refused to recognize his position and issued orders for his arrest a few months later. Li then fled to Mongolia. In September 1950, Mongolia acceded to Chinese demands, and extradited Li back to China, where he was charged with anti-Chinese activities and imprisoned. He was pardoned in 1964, and assigned a job at a history museum in Hohhot, Inner Mongolia. He died in Hohhot in Inner Mongolia in May 1970.

== Sources ==
- Dryburgh, Marjorie. North China and Japanese Expansion 1933-1937: Regional Power and the National Interest. RoutledgeCurzon (2000). ISBN 0-7007-1274-7
- Jowett, Phillip S., Rays of The Rising Sun, Armed Forces of Japan's Asian Allies 1931–45, Volume I: China & Manchuria, 2004. Helion & Co. Ltd., England.
- 中国抗日战争正面战场作战记 (China's Anti-Japanese War Combat Operations)
  - Guo Rugui, editor-in-chief Huang Yuzhang
  - Jiangsu People's Publishing House
  - Date published : 2005–7–1
  - ISBN 7-214-03034-9
  - Online in Chinese:
    - 第二部分：从"九一八"事变到西安事变察哈尔民众抗日同盟军 1
    - Part II : from the "September 18 Incident" to the Xi'an Incident: Anti-Japan military alliance
    - https://web.archive.org/web/20070928130306/http://www.wehoo.net/book/wlwh/a30012/04574.htm
