= Battle of Taiyuan =

1937 battle of the Second Sino-Japanese War

Coordinates: 37.8500°N 112.5500°E

- Part of the Second Sino-Japanese War and the interwar period
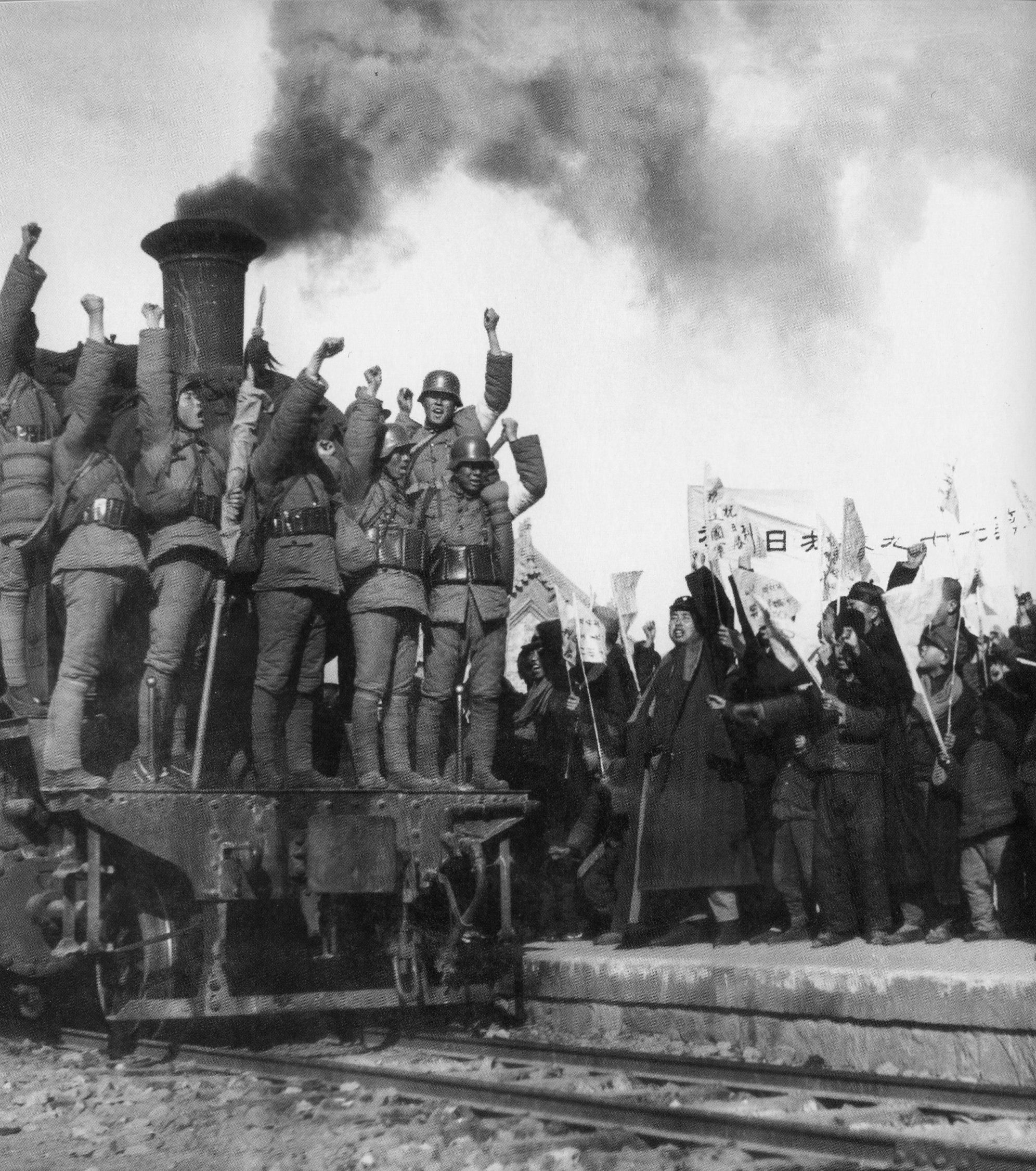
- Chinese troops departing Taiyuan for the frontline, October 1937
Date	September 1 – November 9, 1937 (2 months, 1 week and 1 day)
Location	Taiyuan city, North China Plain, Republic of China
Result	Japanese victory

Belligerents
(Republic of China (1912–1949)) China: Kuomintang; Chinese Communist Party	(Empire of Japan) Japan: Mongol Military Government

Commanders and leaders
(Republic of China (1912–1949)) Yan Xishan (Republic of China (1912–1949)) Yang Aiyuan (Republic of China (1912–1949)) Wei Lihuang; Zhu De (Republic of China (1912–1949)) Fu Zuoyi	(Empire of Japan) Isogai Rensuke (Empire of Japan) Itagaki Seishiro (Mengjiang) Demchugdongrub

Units involved
6th Army Group; 7th Army Group; 14th Army Group; 18th Army Group; 28th Pursuit Squadron, 5th Pursuit Group; Warlord army of Huang Shaohong	5th Division; 20th Division; Provisional air division; 1st Independent Mixed Brigade; 11th Independent Mixed Brigade; 12th Independent Mixed Brigade; 15th Independent Mixed Brigade; 9th Mongolian Cavalry Division

Strength
6 Army Groups, 288,801 men	5 divisions, ~140,000 men

Casualties and losses
Western Claim: 50,000+ killed and wounded Chinese Claim: (Note: Excluding the losses of the Eighth Route Army in the Pingxingguan Ambush but including its losses in the battle of Niangziguan); 2,812 officers and 47,770 soldiers killed 5,457 officers and 71,930 soldiers wounded 52 officers and 1,716 soldiers missing	Western Claim : Thousands of casualties Chinese Claim: 27,472 casualties Japanese Claim: 5th Division: 5,712 casualties 20th Division: about 2,300 casualties 109th Division: 93 casualties 15th mixed brigade and other units from the Kwantung Army: 1,917 casualties

The Battle of Taiyuan (Japanese: 太原作戦; Chinese: 太原會戰) was a major battle fought in 1937 between China and Japan named for Taiyuan (the capital of Shanxi province), which lay in the 2nd Military Region. The battle concluded in a victory for Japan over the National Revolutionary Army (NRA), including part of Suiyuan, most of Shanxi and the NRA arsenal at Taiyuan, and effectively ended large-scale organized resistance in the North China area.

Japanese forces included the Japanese Northern China Area Army under Hisaichi Terauchi, elements of the Kwantung Army, and elements of the Inner Mongolian Army led by Demchugdongrub. Chinese forces were commanded by Yan Xishan (warlord of Shanxi), Wei Lihuang (14th Army Group), and Fu Zuoyi (7th Army Group), as well as Zhu De who led the Eighth Route Army of the Chinese Communist Party (under the Second United Front alliance). Occupation of the territories gave the Japanese access to coal from Datong in northern Shanxi, but also exposed them to attacks by the guerrilla forces of the Nationalist army including the Eighth Route Army, tying down many Japanese troops which could have been diverted to other campaigns.

== Background ==
After the Marco Polo Bridge incident in July 1937 the Japanese invaded North China. By the end of that month the Japanese North China Area Army (Japanese: 北支那方面軍, Kita Shina hōmen gun) under Lieutenant General Kiyoshi Katsuki were at the outskirts of Beiping. In August and September 1937, following the capture of Beiping and the commencement of the offensive westwards through Nan Pass to Shanxi, the North China Area Army advanced southwards along the primary rail lines. However, the advance was necessitated to be suspended in order to allocate resources to the Shanghai front, which required three divisions, and the Manchuria front, for which one division was required. The group made a strategic halt at the Yellow River near Jinan, which is located on the border of Shandong province. In this particular instance, it is conceivable that a cessation of hostilities would have occurred in anticipation of Han Fuju, the governor of Shandong, potentially aligning with the Japanese.

Instead, while the Japanese were waiting, Governor Han obeyed Chiang Kai-shek's orders to destroy Japanese property. In Qingdao, the local authorities suddenly purchased 10,000 gallons of kerosene, which they used to carry out the destruction on 29 and 30 December. Due to Japan's significant investments in Shandong, it was crucial that the province be captured swiftly, prompting the North China Area Army to resume its advance. This time, Han chose not to fight, for which Chiang had him executed, and the Japanese occupation of Qingdao was unopposed. Operations in China now came to a halt. The 1937 campaigns had consumed vast quantities of men and munitions, and the Rape of Nanking alone had caused a breakdown in discipline serious enough to undermine the military effectiveness of the mainland armies. Time was needed to consolidate, replenish and repair the war machine before it could advance again.

== Battle ==
Despite the military leadership's urging, Seishiro did not intend to advance immediately. At this time, the Shanxi Army (2nd Area Army) was gathering in Yanxishan along the Nei Jangcheng Line and strengthening its defences. Seishiro, was determined to attack these enemy forces to prevent their advance. On 19 September, Lieutenant General Itagaki expressed his opinion in a personal letter to three officers, Shun Tada (Deputy Chief of the General Staff), Kanji Ishihara (Chief of Operations, General Staff Headquarters) and Juichi Terauchi (Commander of the North China Area Army), that in North China, the line of Suiyuan, Taiyuan, Shijiazhuang, Jinan and Qingdao should generally be occupied and the resources encompassed there should be acquired, and that a new North China Government should be formed. The proposal for the establishment of a new North China Government was conveyed in the form of a personal letter to Tada Shun (Deputy Chief of the General Staff), Ishihara Kanji (Chief of Operations of the General Staff) and Terauchi Juichi (Commander of the North China Area Forces). At the General Staff Headquarters, Akira Muto, Chief of the Operations Section, tried to persuade Ishihara and Tada, who were non-expansionists to commence with the operation.

=== Pingtung Kan ===
On 21 September, Lieutenant General Itagaki, commander of the 5th Division, issued an order to the 21st Infantry Brigade (Miura Detachment) instructing them to pursue the enemy from Lingqiu to Dayingzhen. On 22 September, the Miura Detachment (comprising three infantry battalions) met with heavy resistance from Chinese forces in the vicinity of the Pingxing Pass (a mountain pass situated near the present-day border between Lingqiu County's Baigaidai Township and Fanshi County's Hengjian Township) as they gradually advanced towards Dayingzhen. General Yan Xishan, commander of the Second War Zone, had ordered the deployment of the 6th Group Army (under the command of Yang Aiyuan), the 7th Group Army (under the command of Fu Zuoyi), and other units around 60,000 to 70,000 men along the Great Wall line connecting Pingxing Pass, Yanmen Pass, and Shenchi against the Japanese advance.

As a consequence of the Nationalist-Communist Cooperation Agreement, the Chinese Communist Party dispatched the 18th Group Army (Eighth Route Army) to Shanxi Province in mid-September to support the operations of the Second War Zone. The 115th Division, under the command of Lin Biao, advanced east of Pingxing Pass, undertaking a diversionary offensive against the Japanese rear. On 25 September, Chinese reinforcements under the command of Fu Zuoyi were deployed in a counterattack on the front lines at Pingxing Pass, resulting in the encirclement of the Miura Detachment. At the same time, the 115th Division, which had initiated its operation, launched an ambush on the supply units of the 5th Division between Xiaohan Village and Guankou Village. They targeted a logistics motorized company that was returning to Lingqiu from the front line and a large baggage train of the 21st Infantry Regiment that was advancing to the front line. As a result, their forces were almost entirely annihilated at around the same time. A total of 150-240 Japanese casualties were recorded. (Note: The Chinese Communist Party subsequently claimed to have eliminated over 10,000 Japanese troops in the conflict, a figure that was later revised to less than 1,000. This was declared to be the initial victory in the Second Sino-Japanese War.)

The loss of supply units has led to a shortage of ammunition within the Miura Detachment. When Itagaki learned of the critical situation of the Miura Detachment on 25 September, he ordered the 42nd Infantry Regiment to advance rapidly towards Pingxing Pass. Meanwhile, the leading elements of the 21st Infantry Regiment attempted to outflank Pingxing Pass from the north, but joining the main forces of the brigade on 28 September. Concurrently, the Kwantung Army directed the Tokugawa Detachment to proceed towards Pingxing Pass on 22 September to provide support to the 5th Division. Thanks to these reinforcements, the 21st Infantry Brigade (Miura Detachment) was able to launch a coordinated attack on 29 September, with support from the Tokugawa Detachment. However, the attack was unsuccessful.

At the same time, the Kwantung Army received reports that the 5th Division had breached Pingxing Pass, captured Dayingzhen, and was advancing westward toward Fanshi. This report however turned out to be false. Based on this misinformation, the 15th Mixed Brigade and the 2nd Mixed Brigade were deployed to Fanshi with the objective of cutting off the Chinese retreat. However, they encountered a strongly fortified position at Yueyuekou along the Great Wall line. The 15th Mixed Brigade commenced assaults on 27 September, breached the opposing forces' defences on 29 September, and swiftly advanced to occupy Fanshi. Uporn learning that their rear were cut off the Chinese forces there began a general retreat on 30 September. Despite the anticipated westward withdrawal towards Fanshi, the majority of the Chinese troops retreated southward towards Wutai Mountain. As a consequence of this strategic manoeuvre, the understrength mixed brigades failed to inflict significant disruption as they pursued the enemy. On the same day, the Miura Brigade rallied at Dayingzhen for rest. During the operation, the 5th Division suffered 1,070 casualties. Combined with the losses of the mixed brigades and attached units, the Imperial Japanese Army and Kwantung Army suffered a total of 1,506 casualties in the operation.

=== Battle of the Ladies Pass ===
On October 8, Chiang Kai-shek ordered two armies, a Corps and a division to defend the Ladies Pass, a critical point on the rail line to Taiyuan. The Chinese defenders mounted a 35-mile defensive line just east of a spur of the Great Wall. When Shijiazhuang fell on October 10, the Japanese 20th Division attacked the defensive line. Four days later, the Japanese broke through the Chinese outer defenses, but advanced too fast and were quickly surrounded by Chinese troops and guerrillas. The Japanese managed to hold their ground despite sustaining severe losses, and the Chinese retreated back to the main defensive point at Ladies pass on October 22.

On October 27, the Japanese 109th Division reinforced the 20th Division, and launched a two-pronged attack against the pass. The Chinese 3rd Corps, alarmed at the prospect of being encircled, retreated from its positions to Pingding 20 miles away. The Japanese attacked Chinese positions at the Wall and Ladies Pass, and forced the Chinese defenders into a rout. This resulted in an open path to Taiyuan for the 20th and 109th Japanese Division.

=== Battle for the Outer Line of Defense ===
On October 13, the Japanese 5th Division and the Chahar Expeditionary Force, supported by air and heavy artillery bombardments, attacked the Chinese defenses North of Taiyuan. The Chinese defenders had entrenched themselves in prepared fortifications, and managed to hold the Japanese off for ten days in fierce hand-to-hand fighting. Both sides suffered thousands of casualties in the ferocious fighting.

On October 23, the Japanese finally ripped through the Chinese lines. The Chinese units conducted an orderly retreat and took up positions atop the high ground on the Blue Dragon Ridge, 20 miles north of Taiyuan.

=== Battle for Blue Dragon Ridge ===
The Chinese defenders at Blue Dragon Ridge fought against relentless Japanese attacks for another five days, enduring repeated air, artillery and tank attacks. Of key importance was the Tungshan fort, a massive fortification that controlled the eastern half of the Chinese defenses with its height. The Chinese managed to fight for another five days, but on November 2, Japanese engineers tunneled under Tungshan and set off a series of charges beneath it. The resulting massive explosion destroyed the key bastion and its entire garrison. On November 3, the Chinese withdrew to their final positions 5 miles north of Taiyuan. The Left Flank Army crossed the Fen River and dispersed into the mountains to the west. The fighting for Blue Dragon Ridge had cost the Chinese dearly: some 30,000 of Yan's troops had been lost holding the hills.

=== Final Battle for Taiyuan ===
In early November, the Japanese attacked the last defense positions north of Taiyuan. The 20th and 109th Divisions, having marched unopposed to the area, flanked the city. By this point, Taiyuan was under assault from the north, east, and southeast. On November 7, most of the Chinese troops had evacuated the city in a disorganized mob. The Japanese demanded that the remaining Chinese units surrender. Local commanders refused.

The Japanese responded on the morning of November 8 by showering the city with bombs, heavy artillery, and blasted their way through the city gates and walls with cannon fire and tanks. Assault troops of the 5th Division smashed rushed the gaps and crashed into the city, but were confronted by the Chinese defenders. A bitter hand-to-hand battle broke out in the streets and alleyways of Taiyuan that lasted through the night. By evening, half of Taiyuan had fallen, and much of it had been destroyed.

In the night of November 8, the last Chinese units in the city attempted to escape the city, joining crowds of panicked refugees fleeing over the Fen River bridge. In the chaos of the rout, panicking Chinese soldiers shoved civilians off the bridge to make room for themselves. By the morning of November 9, those soldiers and civilians that still remained jammed in the southwest gate and the sole bridge were strafed and bombed by Japanese planes, killing and injuring countless people. By the night of November 9, Taiyuan had been captured by the Japanese forces. The Chinese had lost 20,000 men and 80 artillery pieces defending the city. The Chinese army recorded suffering 6,725 casualties in the defense of Taiyuan. Tens of thousands of civilians were killed and injured, and most of the city had been destroyed in the fighting. On November 10, the Japanese pushed to Pingyao 55 miles south of Taiyuan, and wiped out the last Chinese resistance in the region. By this point, the Japanese had secured the majority of Shanxi Province.

== See also ==
- Order of battle of the Battle of Taiyuan

== Bibliography ==
- Clodfelter, Micheal (2008). Warfare and armed conflicts : a statistical encyclopedia of casualty and other figures, 1494-2007. Jefferson: McFarland. ISBN 9780786433193.
- Kuromiya, Hiroaki (2023). Stalin, Japan, and the Struggle for Supremacy over China, 1894–1945. New York: Routledge. ISBN 978-1-032-06673-8.
- Harries, Meirion; Harries, Susie (1991). Soldiers of the sun : the rise and fall of the Imperial Japanese Army. New York: Random House. ISBN 0394569350.
- Dorn, Frank (1974). The Sino-Japanese War, 1937-41: From Marco Polo Bridge to Pearl Harbor. New York: Macmillan. ISBN 0025322001.
- Levine, Steven I.; Chieh Hsiung, James (2015). China's bitter victory : the war with Japan, 1937-1945. London: Routledge. ISBN 9781563242465.
- Long-hsuen, Hsu; Ming-kai, Chang (1971). History of The Sino-Japanese War (1937-1945). Taipei: Chung Wu Publishing. pp. 195–200. OCLC 28762092.
- Parks, Coble M. (1991). Facing Japan: Chinese Politics and Japanese Imperialism, 1931-1937. Cambridge, Mass.: Harvard University Press. ISBN 0674290119.
- Senshishitsu, Bōei Kenshūjo (1975). 昭和十三年一月まで. 支那事変陸軍作戦 (in Japanese). Vol. 1. Tōkyō: 朝雲新聞社. OCLC 796190507.
- 謝, 幼田 (2006). 抗日戦争中、中国共産党は何をしていたか : 覆い隠された歴史の真実 (in Japanese). Tōkyō: 草思社. ISBN 4794215088.
- 菊池, 一隆 (2009). 中国抗日軍事史 : 1937-1945 (in Japanese). Tōkyō: 有志舎. ISBN 4903426211.
- 越智, 春海 (1988). 華南戦記 (in Japanese). Tōkyō: 図書出版社. OCLC 19965087.
