= Fu Zuoyi =

Chinese general and politician (1895–1974)

Fu Zuoyi 傅作义
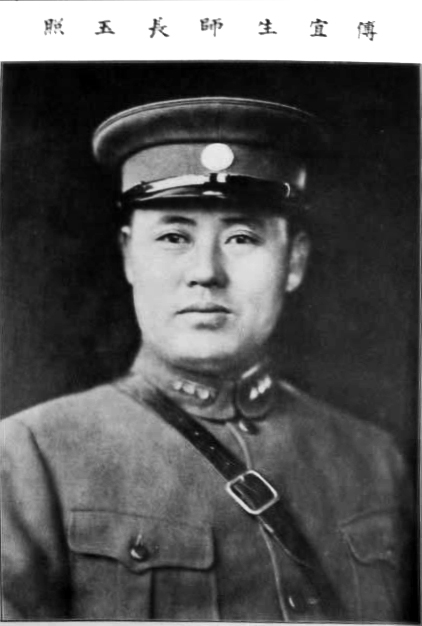
- General Fu Zuoyi
- Born: June 27, 1895; Linyi County, Shanxi, Qing Empire
- Died: April 19, 1974 (aged 78); Beijing, People's Republic of China
- Military career
- Allegiance: Republic of China; China
- Service years: 1911–1949
- Rank: General
- Unit: (Republic of China (1912–1949)) National Revolutionary Army
- Commands: 59th corps, 12th war zone, North China Pacification Command
- Conflicts: Xinhai Revolution; Northern Expedition; Central Plains War; Suiyuan Campaign; Second Sino-Japanese War; Battle of Taiyuan; Battle of Wuyuan; Chinese Civil War; Datong-Jining Campaign; Battle of Kalgan; Pingjin Campaign
- Other work: Politician

Fu Zuoyi (simplified Chinese: 傅作义; traditional Chinese: 傅作義; pinyin: Fù Zuòyì; Wade–Giles: Fu Tso-i) (June 2, 1895 − April 19, 1974) was a Chinese military leader. He began his military career in the service of Yan Xishan, and he was widely praised for his defense of Suiyuan from the Japanese. During the final stages of the Chinese Civil War, Fu surrendered the large and strategic garrison around Beiping to Communist forces. He later served in the government of the People's Republic of China as Minister of the Hydraulic Ministry.

== Biography ==
=== Early military career ===
Fu began his career as an officer in Yan Xishan's Shanxi army. He served with distinction during the 1927–1928 Northern Expedition, after Yan declared his allegiance to the Kuomintang. Fu fought for Yan in the 1929–1930 Central Plains War, when Yan attempted to form a central government with himself as president. Yan's forces were easily routed by the forces of Chiang Kai-shek, and Yan was forced to live for a short period in exile.

=== Defense of Suiyuan ===
After Yan returned to Shanxi in 1931, Fu led Yan Xishan's efforts to "colonize" and take control over the Inner Mongolian province of Suiyuan. Most of the work and settlement of Suiyuan at this time was done by Shanxi farmer-soldiers under Fu's direction. The activities of Fu's farmer-soldiers included mining Suiyuan's iron deposits (24% of all in China) and bringing over 4,000 acres (16 km^{2}) of farmland under cultivation for the first time. Fu cultivated a close relationship with Zhang Xueliang in order to increase the legitimacy of Yan's control over Suiyuan.

In March 1936, Manchukuo troops occupying Chahar invaded northeastern Suiyuan, contesting Fu's control. These Japanese-aligned troops seized the city of Bailingmiao in northern Suiyuan, where the pro-Japanese Inner Mongolian Autonomous Political Council maintained its headquarters. Three months later, the head of the Political Council, Demchugdongrub declared that he was the ruler of an independent Mongolia (Mengguguo), and organized an army with the aid of Japanese equipment and training. In August 1936 Demchugdongrub's army attempted to invade eastern Suiyuan, but it was defeated by Yan's forces under the command of Fu Zuoyi. Following this defeat, Demchugdongrub planned another invasion while Japanese agents carefully sketched and photographed Suiyuan's defenses.

In November 1936 the army of Demchugdongrub presented Fu Zuoyi with an ultimatum to surrender. When Fu responded that Demchugdongrub was merely a puppet of "certain quarters" and requested that Demchugdongrub submit to the authority of the central government, Demchugdongrub's armies launched another, more ambitious attack. Demchugdongrub's 15,000 soldiers were armed with Japanese weapons, supported by Japanese aircraft, and often led by Japanese officers. (Japanese soldiers fighting for Mengguguo were often executed by Fu after their capture as illegal combatants, since Mengguguo was not recognized as being part of Japan).

In anticipation of the Second Sino-Japanese War, Japanese spies destroyed a large supply depot in Datong and carried out other acts of sabotage. In order to defend Suiyuan, Yan placed his best troops and most able generals, including Zhao Chengshou and Yan's son-in-law, Wang Jingguo, under Fu's command. During the month of fighting that ensued, the army of Mengguguo suffered severe casualties. Fu's forces succeeded in occupying Bailingmiao on November 24, 1936, and was considering invading Chahar before he was warned by the Kwantung Army that doing so would provoke an attack by the Japanese Army. Demchugdongrub's forces repeatedly attempted to retake Bailingmiao, but this only provoked Fu into sending troops north, where he successfully seized the last of Demchugdongrub's bases in Suiyuan and virtually annihilated his army. After Japanese were found to be aiding Demchugdongrub, Yan publicly accused Japan of aiding the invaders. Fu's victories in Suiyuan over Japanese-backed forces were praised by Chinese newspapers and magazines, other warlords and political leaders, and many students and members of the Chinese public. Fu's victories in Suiyuan greatly increased his prestige, and the prestige of Yan Xishan.

=== Defense against the Communists and Japanese ===
During the Second Sino-Japanese War, Fu held numerous commands in North China. As Commander of 7th Army Group he fought in Operation Chahar, the Battle of Taiyuan and the 1939–1940 Winter Offensive, in which he was responsible for winning the Battle of Wuyuan. Fu ended the war as Commander of the 12th War Area, comprising Rehe, Chahar, and Suiyuan.

At the end of the war, Fu Zuoyi’s Nationalist forces and the Communists were both vying for the Japanese-controlled Zhangjiakou. Fu Zuoyi had promised to his counterpart Hiroshi Nemoto, the commander of the Mongolia Garrison Army, that if the Japanese handed over Zhangjiakou to his troops then they will protect the Japanese residents and their livelihoods, but also warned that if the Soviet Red Army or the Communist Eighth Route Army had captured the city then he would not be able to guarantee their safety. The Japanese commander was initially receptive of Fu Zuoyi’s suggestion to hold on until the Nationalists arrived. His troops had been engaged with both the Soviets and the Chinese Communists who were attempting to liberate Zhangjiakou before the Nationalists could even as negotiations continued, and Hiroshi Nemoto feared that if they were to capture the city then the over 20,000 Japanese residents would be subjected to a reign of terror which had been seen in other formerly Japanese-occupied places under Soviet control. However, after discussions with General Yasuji Okamura, it was decided that the Mongolia Garrison Army would deploy a portion of its troops to engage in delaying actions against the Soviets while the Japanese soldiers and civilians in the city evacuated to Beijing and Tianjin, thus leaving Zhangjiakou to the Communists.

During the Chinese Civil War, Fu's forces (500,000 men) controlled the critically important Suiyuan-Beiping Corridor that separated Manchuria from China proper. After the Communists captured the Manchurian provinces in late 1948, they infiltrated Fu's inner circle and pressured him to negotiate a peaceful solution for the inevitable Communist take over. At the same time, Fu became increasingly disillusioned with Chiang. Fu's personal estrangement from Chiang reaching a climax in October 1948, when Chiang suddenly withdrew from a critical meeting on the defense of territory under Fu's command without giving any immediate explanation. Sometime earlier Chiang's son, Chiang Ching-kuo, had arrested and refused to release his cousin, Kung Ling-kan, as part of a broader effort to punish economic and financial criminals. Realizing that her nephew could be executed for his crimes, and that Chiang Ching-kuo was highly likely to execute Kong to set an example, Soong Mei-ling begged her husband Chiang Kai-shek to fly immediately to Shanghai to rescue Kung. Chiang left in the middle of the most important stage of defensive planning, a great blow to Nationalist morale and left an impression on Fu and many other Nationalist commanders. Fu remarked that this proved Chiang "loved the beauty more than the throne," that is, he had placed the welfare of his family above the welfare of the nation.

Communist agents active within Fu's inner circle included Fu's own daughter, Fu Dongju, and Fu's most trusted personal secretary, Major General Yan Youwen (閻又文), who was from the same hometown as Fu (Ronghe, in Yuncheng). Fu Dongju, Yan Youwen, and other agents pressured Fu to surrender and repeatedly passed vital intelligence to the Communists. Fu began secret negotiations with Lin Biao, in which he arranged the surrender of the Beiping garrison, totaling a quarter of a million men, on January 31, 1949. Yan Youwen acted as Fu's representative during Fu's communication with Lin, but Fu did not know the true allegiance of Yan until after the establishment of the People's Republic of China.

=== Life in Communist China ===
Fu's contributions to the Chinese Communist Party's success were rewarded with high posts, including the Minister of Hydraulics, which he kept until 1972, as well as posts in the Chinese People's Political Consultative Conference. During the Cultural Revolution (1966–1975) Fu was part of a list of people drafted by Zhou Enlai and approved by Mao to be protected and was moved to Jingxi Hotel for safeguarding. Fu's daughter, Fu Dongju was not impacted by the upheaval either.

== Military career: important dates ==
- 1928–1929 General Officer Commanding Tianjin Garrison Command
- 1929–1930 General Officer Commanding 10th Army
- 1930–1932 General Officer Commanding 35th Army
- 1931–1946 Chairman of the Government Suiyuan Province
- 1933–1941 Commander in Chief 7th Army Group
- 1937–1941 General Officer Commanding 35th Corps
- 1938 Commander in Chief Northern Route Force, 2nd War Area
- 1939–1945 Deputy Commander in Chief 8th War Area
- 1945 Commander in Chief 12th War Area
- 1945–1947 Director of Kalgan Pacification Headquarters
- 1946–1947 Chairman of the Government of Chahar Province
- 1947–1948 Commander in Chief General Headquarters for Bandit Suppression in North China

Government offices
Preceded by none	Minister of Water Resources; 1949–1958	Succeeded by Qian Zhengying
