= Scha =

Scha may refer to:

== People ==
- Remko Scha (1945–2015), Dutch professor of computational linguistics
- Scha Alyahya (born 1983), Malaysian model, actress and TV host

== Other ==
- Shcha (Щ), a Cyrillic letter
- Chamonate Airport (ICAO: SCHA), an airport serving Copiapó, Atacama Region, Chile

== See also ==
- Sha (disambiguation)
- Shah (disambiguation)
