= SAH =

SAH or Sah may refer to:

== People with the surname ==
- Babu Himmat Sah, Founder ruler of Kohra (estate)
- Chih-Tang Sah (1932–2025), Chinese-American electronics engineer and condensed matter physicist

== Places ==
- Sah, Iran, a village in Semnan Province
- Sah, Mali, a village in the Mopti Region
- Sah, Yemen
- Western Sahara, UNDP country code SAH

== Transport ==
- Sanaa International Airport's IATA code
- San Hui stop's MTR station code
- Sayakhat Airlines' ICAO code

== Other uses ==
- Sah (god), an Ancient Egyptian god
- Sah (spiritual body), an Ancient Egyptian concept of the soul
- S-adenosyl homocysteine, an amino acid derivative
- Sakha language (ISO 639-2 code)
- Savage Aural Hotbed, a band in Minneapolis, Minnesota, US
- Shabab Al Sahel FC, a Lebanese association football club
- Society of Architectural Historians
- Subarachnoid hemorrhage, bleeding into an area surrounding the brain

== See also ==
- SAHS (disambiguation)
- Shah (disambiguation)
- Saha (disambiguation)
- Sahi (disambiguation)
- Şah Sultan
