= Battle of Pingxingguan =

1937 battle of the Second Sino-Japanese War

- Part of the Battle of Taiyuan in the Second Sino-Japanese War and the interwar period
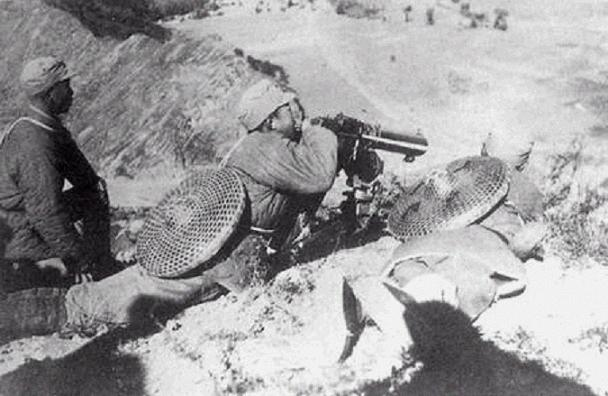
- Chinese soldiers firing a Type 24 heavy machine gun at an ambush against Japanese troops in the Battle of Pingxing Pass
| Date | September 22–29, 1937 (1 week) |
| Location | Pingxingguan in Shanxi province, Republic of China 39°20′43.98″N 113°57′34.23″E |
| Result | Japanese victory |
| Territorial changes | Japanese occupation of Pingxingguan |

Belligerents
| Republic of China Chinese Communist Party | Empire of Japan |

Commanders and leaders
| (Republic of China (1912–1949)) Yan Xishan (Republic of China (1912–1949)) Yang Aiyuan (Republic of China (1912–1949)) Fu Zuoyi; Lin Biao; Zhu De | Itagaki Seishiro |

Units involved
| National Revolutionary Army: Eighth Route Army; National Revolutionary Army Air Force | Imperial Japanese Army |

Strength
| Nationalist troops: 158,307 troops. Communists troops: 6,000 troops of the 115th Division | 5th Division (15,000 troops) of the Imperial Japanese Army and the 2nd and 9th Independent Mixed Brigades of the Kwantung Army: Pingxingguan ambush: certain supply troops and the 3rd Battalion of the 21st Regiment of the 5th Division |

Casualties and losses
| Nationalist troops: 39,402 casualties (Note: Including in the battles of Guangling and Lingqiu from September 13 until September 15) 115th division in the Pingxingguan ambush: ~400 casualties | Chinese claim: Chinese Nationalists claim: 2,952 casualties Chinese Communists claims: (Note: Pingxingguan ambush only); Initial Chinese report: 1,000 casualties Postwar Chinese study: 400–500 casualties Japanese records: 527 killed, 961 wounded, 18 missing: In the Pingxingguan ambush: 165 killed, 75 wounded |

The Battle of Pingxingguan (simplified Chinese: 平型关战役; traditional Chinese: 平型關戰役) was the initial significant confrontation in northwestern Shanxi after the commencement of the full-scale Second Sino-Japanese War at the Pingxing Pass. The conflict commenced in late September and endured for almost ten days. Initially, Chinese soldiers effectively ambushed and repelled Japanese troops in the Pingxingguan region. Subsequently, the Japanese force breached Ruyuekou (Chinese: 茹越口) and seized the county seat of Fanshi. This battle also saw cooperation between Nationalist and Communist troops. The Pingxingguan Ambush, commonly called the Great Victory of Pingxingguan, was a part of this battle fought on 25 September 1937, at the beginning of the Second Sino-Japanese War, between the Eighth Route Army of the Chinese Communist Party and the Imperial Japanese Army.

Yan Xishan, commander of the Second War Zone, dismissed a counterattack plan suggested by Chinese general Fu Zuoyi without adequate assessment, despite the circumstances. He subsequently commanded a complete withdrawal of Chinese defense forces. This decision resulted in a total retreat to the Xinkou line, culminating in the forfeiture of vital positions such as Yanmen Pass and Pingxingguan to Japanese control.

== Background ==
After the capture of Beiping (present Beijing) at the end of July 1937, Japanese forces advanced along the Beijing–Baotou railway to Inner Mongolia. Having anticipated the move, Chiang Kai-shek had appointed the Shanxi warlord Yan Xishan as Pacification Director of Taiyuan. Theoretically, Yan had authority over all the Chinese military forces in his theatre of operations, including Lin Biao's 115th Division of the Communist 8th Route Army, Liu Ruming's ex-Kuomintang troops and various Central Army contingents responsible to Chiang Kai-shek. In reality these forces operated independently from Yan's provincial army.

Japanese forces, mainly the 5th Division and 11th Independent Mixed Brigade, moved out from Beiping and advanced on Huailai County in Chahar. A Japanese column advanced quickly into Shanxi, making use of the railway which the Chinese did not attempt to destroy. On September 10, the Japanese 5th division captured Yu County and the 16th brigade captured Yangquan. The Chinese abandoned Datong on 13 September. On the same day, the 16th brigade attacked the 84th division at Huoshaoling (火燒嶺) while the 5th division also attacked the 21st division, 73rd division, and 3rd independent brigade, fighting fiercely all day long. Lü Chaoran (Chinese: 吕超然), the commander of the 423rd regiment, was killed in action. On September 14, the 5th division occupied Guangling County. On the 15th, the division attacked the 424th regiment of the 73rd division at the Songshushan (松樹山) position, capturing it by morning. Divisional commander Liu Fengbin (Chinese: 刘奉滨) personally led four infantry companies to recapture the position. Liu Fengbin was badly wounded during the fierce fighting and more than half of the troops were killed or wounded. The Chinese army fell back to a line from Yanmen Pass on the Great Wall east to the mountain pass of Pingxingguan.

In reaction to the circumstances, Yan Xishan, commander of the Second War Zone, redeployed the Shanxi-Suiyuan Army and Central Army units—previously withdrawn along the Beiping–Suiyuan Railway—along the Inner Great Wall line at Pingxingguan and Yanmen Pass. Simultaneously, he directed the Eighth Route Army to progress toward Lingqiu, in anticipation of a pivotal confrontation with the Japanese in northern Shanxi.

In accordance with this deployment order, under the directions of Mao Zedong and Zhu De, the Eighth Route Army's 115th and 120th Divisions traversed the Yellow River in late August and early September, respectively. On September 17, Mao provided additional directives to Zhu De, Commander-in-Chief of the Eighth Route Army, instructing the 120th Division to advance towards Yanmen Pass and the 115th Division towards Pingxingguan. On September 23, Zhu De, Peng Dehuai, and Ren Bishi directed the Eighth Route Army headquarters into Nanru Village, Wutai County, to oversee operations directly. Following discussions with the Nationalist Army's 71st Division, the Eighth Route Army resolved to initiate an extermination campaign in proximity to Pingxingguan.

Before the principal confrontation, the Japanese 5th Division's 21st Brigade vanquished the Nationalist 73rd Division at Guangling. It subsequently breached the defensive line maintained by the Independent 3rd Brigade of the 33rd Army at the Guangling–Lingqiu border, seizing control of Lingqiu County on September 20. On September 21, Lt. Gen. Seishirō Itagaki, commander of the Japanese 5th Division, directed Col. Toshiwaza Miura (三浦敏事)'s 21st Brigade to spearhead an assault on Pingxingguan with three battalions. By September 22, Japanese forces had arrived at Pingxingguan, Guangu, and Dongpaochi, where they faced staunch opposition from three regiments of the Nationalist Army's 8th Independent Brigade, a component of the 33rd Army. Concurrently, two battalions of the 21st Regiment progressed northwest towards Pingxingguan through Hunyuan, Xiaodaokou, and Xihekou. The Battle of Pingxingguan officially commenced with this event.

== Battle ==
=== Pingxingguan Ambush ===
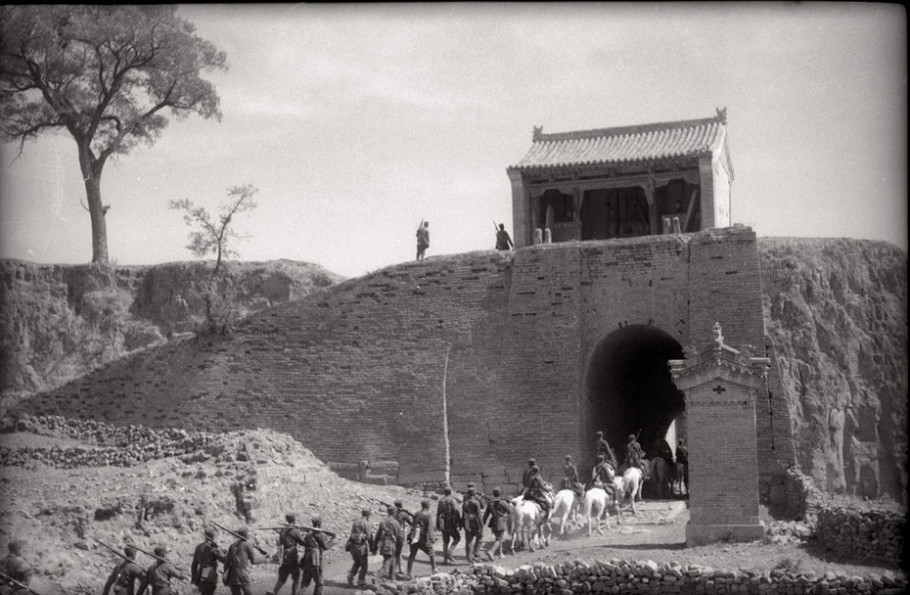
Eighth Route Army troops entering Pingxingguan. Photograph by Sha Fei

The pass of Pingxingguan was a narrow defile worn through the loess, with no exit for several kilometres except the road itself. On the evening of September 22, the 115th Division of the Eighth Route Army, under the leadership of Lin Biao and Nie Rongzhen, reached Shangzai Town, located southeast of Pingxingguan. To facilitate the withdrawal of the Nationalist 73rd Division from Lingqiu County, the 115th Division convened a mobilization meeting on September 23 for all officers at the company level and higher. The strategy designated the 343rd Brigade's 685th and 686th Regiments to execute the primary offensive, while the 344th Brigade's 687th Regiment was ordered to obstruct reinforcements. The 688th Regiment was appointed as the primary reserve force. The division's autonomous regiment was tasked with traversing the region between Lingqiu and Laiyuan, while the cavalry battalion operated between Lingqiu and Guangling to impede Japanese supply lines. Subsequent to the meeting, the division's primary contingent advanced swiftly to Ranzhuang Village, located 15 kilometers southeast of Pingxingguan.

On September 24, the Nationalist garrison at Pingxingguan presented a collaborative fighting strategy to the 115th Division for synchronization with the Eighth Route Army's ambush. The Eighth Route Army was designated to execute the frontal assault, but the Nationalist forces were tasked with defense and flanking maneuvers. Lin Biao and Nie Rongzhen sanctioned the plan following careful consideration. That night, amidst torrential rain, the 343rd Brigade progressed into the Baiyatai region, while the primary force remained concealed on the eastern inclines of the valley between Xiaozhai and Laoyemiao. The division command post was established on a hill to the southeast of Laoyemiao (Chinese: 老爷庙).

At 7 a.m. on September 25, numerous Japanese military transport trucks traversed the ambush area. The logistical column of the 21st Brigade entered the death zone shortly thereafter. This unit comprised around 100 trucks, in excess of 200 carts, and a contingent of cavalry. The ambush commenced with the 685th and 686th Regiments executing a synchronized assault. Following a barrage of gunfire from rifles and machine guns, they advanced into the valley for hand-to-hand fighting along the roadway. Japanese forces endeavored to capture the crucial elevation at Laoyemiao but were thwarted by the 3rd Battalion of the 686th Regiment, incurring significant casualties. By afternoon, the 687th Regiment entered the fray, exacerbating the encirclement. This engagement represented the inaugural significant triumph for Chinese forces on the frontal battlefield since the commencement of full-scale war, subsequently referred to as the "Victory at Pingxingguan." The conflict yielded in excess of 1,000 Japanese losses, the annihilation of over 100 vehicles and 200 carts, and the seizure of one Type 92 infantry cannon, more than 2,000 shells, over 20 machine guns, in excess of 1,000 rifles, and over 50 warhorses.

To facilitate the ambush near Laoyemiao, the Independent Regiment of the 115th Division, commanded by Yang Chengwu, reached Yaozhan Village (Chinese: 腰站村)—located on the transportation route between Laiyuan and Lingqiu—by noon on September 24. The 1st Battalion of the regiment occupied Yimaling to impede Japanese advances, while the 2nd Battalion captured Sanshan Town northeast of Lingqiu to disrupt the path between Guangling and Lingqiu. The 3rd Battalion functioned as the reserve unit. At dawn on September 25, two Japanese regiments advanced into Yimaling from Laiyuan. Upon entering range, the Eighth Route Army commenced firing, and the conflict rapidly escalated into close-quarters fighting. By 3 p.m., upon receiving news of the triumph at Pingxingguan, the Independent Regiment escalated their offensive. Certain units initiated assaults from the Japanese rear, compelling the adversary to withdraw to Laiyuan. The 1st Battalion chased them near the city before retreating. The conflict yielded more than 400 Japanese losses and the acquisition of significant military supplies, thus accomplishing the blocking mission.

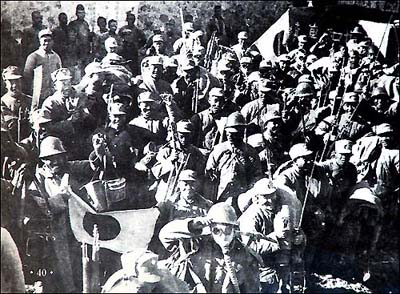
Captured Japanese supplies by the 115th Division of the Eighth Route Army after the Pingxingguan Ambush

Simultaneously, while the conflict intensified near Laoyemiao, the Nationalist 71st Division assaulted almost 2,000 withdrawing Japanese soldiers near Dongpaochi (Chinese: 东跑池). The Japanese launched a counteroffensive to the northwest in an effort to escape. Nevertheless, the 17th Army, initially designated to flank the Japanese from Tuanchengkou north of Pingxingguan, vacated its position due to apprehension of encirclement. This resulted in the Japanese capturing the region from Yaozijian to Xipaochi, nearly surrounding the 71st Division. At this pivotal juncture, the Eighth Route Army's 686th Regiment assaulted Japanese forces around Dongpaochi, while the 685th Regiment reclaimed elevated terrain west of Guangu and Xinzhuang, thwarting reinforcement efforts by more Japanese units. Shortly thereafter, General Chen Changjie commanded the 61st Army to Dongpaochi, compelling the Japanese to withdraw to Tuanchengkou. While the breakout attempt was not entirely obstructed, the intervention averted the encirclement of the 71st Division. Capitalizing on the withdrawal, two battalions of the 434th Regiment, 217th Brigade of the 61st Army, advanced and reclaimed Yaozijian.

Subsequent to this encounter, the Japanese 5th Division ceased their advance against Pingxingguan. Consequently, because Yang Aiyuan and Sun Chu, subordinates of Yan Xishan, were unable to mobilize Central Army forces, overall command of the operation was reassigned to General Fu Zuoyi.

=== Battles of Yaozijian and Dongpaochi ===
At this juncture, Japanese forces at Guangu and Tuanchengkou had been firmly encircled by Chinese troops. The Japanese executed a pincer maneuver against Yaozijian from both Tuanchengkou and Guangu. The Chinese 434th Regiment made a vigorous defense; nevertheless, due to the enemy's numerical advantage, the whole regiment—including its commander Cheng Jixian and battalion commanders Fu Guanying and Liang Shirong—was nearly annihilated, resulting in over a thousand losses. Fewer than 100 soldiers successfully withdrew. The 433rd Regiment, assigned to provide reinforcement, did not arrive at the battlefield punctually.

On September 26, the Japanese augmented their offensive on Dongpaochi with aerial and artillery support. The conflict persisted until the 27th. Ultimately, only 148 soldiers persisted from the original 500-member 1st Battalion of the Chinese 623rd Regiment safeguarding the region. Simultaneously, Chinese forces persisted in their resistance against the Japanese in Guangu, but a critical elevation was ultimately surrendered. Subsequently, nearly 300 cadets arrived to bolster the garrison, incurring more than 80 casualties. They successfully seized almost 200 units of Japanese heavy armaments, encompassing heavy machine guns and grenade launchers. During this period, the Eighth Route Army executed persistent harassment attacks in the Japanese rear.

In response to the deteriorating circumstances, Fu Zuoyi, with Yan Xishan's consent, resolved to reassign the 35th Army from Yanmen Pass to the Tuanchengkou area (Chinese: 团城口). The objective was to encircle the Japanese forces around Caijiayu (Chinese: 蔡家峪) in Lingqiu County, adjacent to Pingxingguan, and initiate a decisive confrontation.

=== Battle of Ruyuekou ===
Prior to the arrival of the 35th Army at Tuanchengkou, the Japanese Tojo Detachment altered its initial strategy to attack Yanmen Pass and instead progressed southward from Ying County, aiming for Ruyuekou (Chinese: 茹越口)—situated between Mount Heng and Yanmen Pass. In this region, the Chinese defenders consisted of three regiments from the 203rd Brigade of the 34th Army.

On September 27, the Japanese initiated an offensive against Ruyuekou, aided by planes, tanks, artillery, and Mongol auxiliary forces. The defending forces incurred significant casualties, and the position was rapidly overwhelmed. Brigade Commander Liang Jiantang successfully reorganized the remaining forces and retreated to the elevated positions between Ruyuekou and Songjiayao. Subsequently, Liang Jiantang and Battalion Commander Chu Shouchang were killed in fighting, leading to the fall of Songjiayao to the Japanese forces. Fewer than one regiment of Chinese forces successfully retreated.

Shortly thereafter, the Independent 2nd Brigade of the 19th Army, positioned at Yanmen Pass, executed a flanking operation to reclaim Ruyuekou; however, it was dispersed by Japanese cavalry, resulting in the loss of an entire regiment. On September 29, the county seat of Fanshi succumbed to Japanese forces, resulting in a substantial breach of the Chinese defensive line and directly jeopardizing the rear of the primary battleground at Pingxingguan.

Concerned that the Japanese may seize the route from Ekou to Mount Wutai—thereby obstructing his retreat—Yan Xishan, without ascertaining the number of Japanese forces in Fanshi, commanded a complete retirement from the Yanmen Pass–Pingxingguan line to the vicinity of Xinkou, Xin County, and Mount Wutai. He also dismissed the strategy put out by Fu Zuoyi and Chen Changjie to launch a counteroffensive against Fanshi and secure the breach. Subsequently, the Japanese were instructed to initiate their advance on Taiyuan, resulting in the commencement of the Battle of Xinkou.

== Evaluation ==
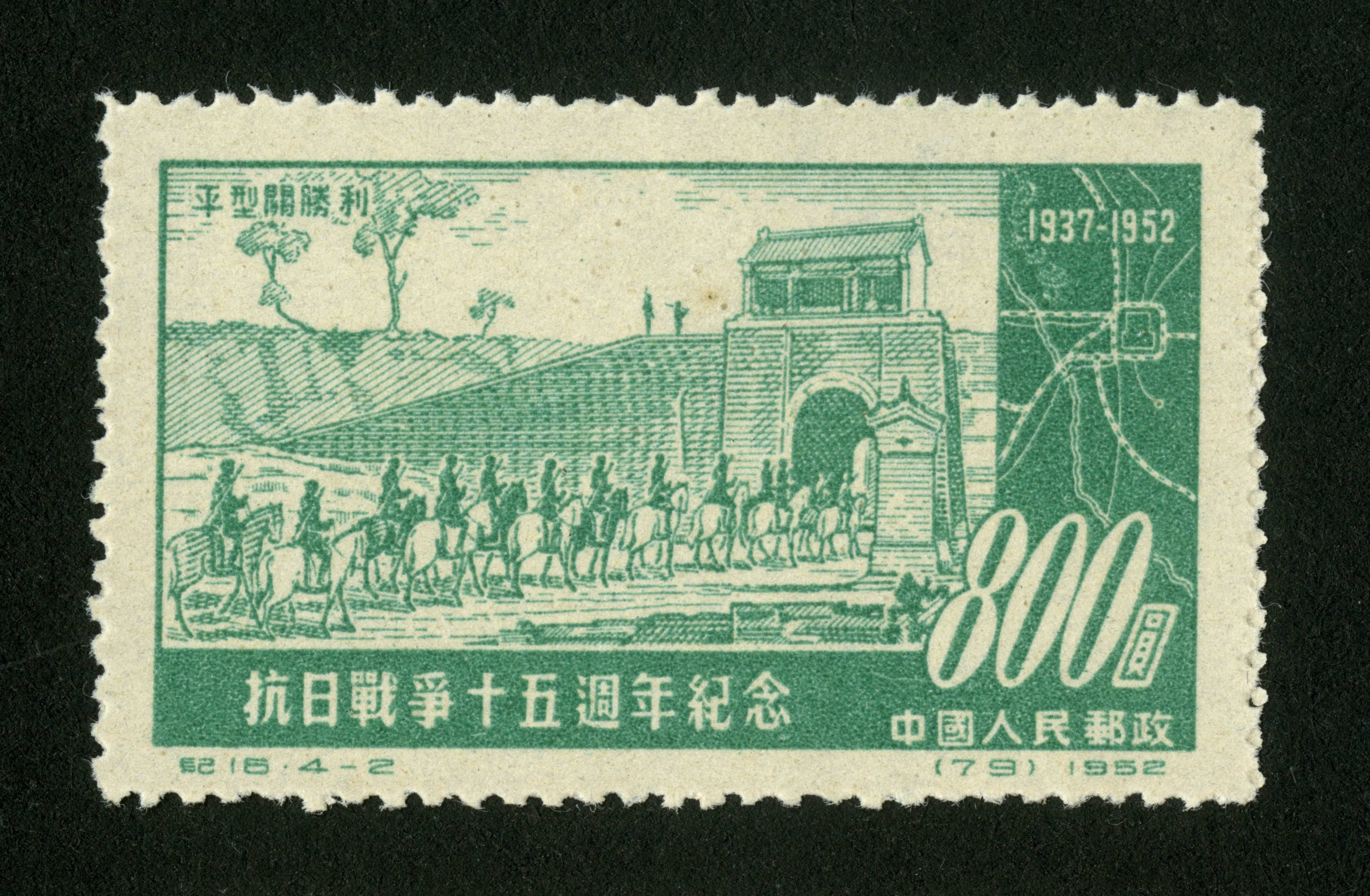
Commemorative stamp issued by the People's Republic of China in July 1952 for the 15th anniversary of the War of Resistance Against Japan.

=== Pingxingguan Ambush ===
The 'history of the Anti-Japanese War' recorded that the 115th division wiped out a battalion of troops and destroyed 80 trucks at Caijiayu and Xiaozhai Village during the ambush on September 25. On the other hand, the Communists' accounts describe Pingxingguan as a typical example of Red guerrilla tactics, inspired by Mao Zedong's conceptualization of people's war. The victory significantly boosted Chinese morale and enhanced the Chinese Communist Party's credibility among the populace. CCP leaders frequently cited the battle as a demonstration of their determination and effectiveness in resisting the Japanese occupation.

According to Professor Jiang Keshi, the basic fact of the victory in the Pingxingguan Ambush had been exaggerated over time through years of propaganda to highlight the heroism of the soldiers. The claim of 1,000 enemy soldiers annihilated in Chinese Communist propaganda for the ambush was the closest to the actual number of casualties (240 dead or wounded) among the propagandized battles involving Chinese Communist armies that the author had researched. For example, the "Five Heroes of Langya Mountain" were claimed to have annihilated 90 enemy soldiers when in fact only 1 Japanese soldier was wounded. The "Heroic Company of Liulaozhuang" were claimed to have annihilated 170 to 300 enemy soldiers when only 2 Japanese soldiers were actually killed. The Yaozhan blocking battle was claimed to have annihilated 300 to 400 enemy soldiers when in reality 2 Japanese soldiers were killed and 7 were wounded. The battle of Daoma Pass was claimed to have annihilated 30 to 100 enemy soldiers when only 1 Japanese soldier was lightly wounded. And the Yangmingbao night raid was claimed to have destroyed 24 enemy aircraft while only 1 was badly damaged, and so on.

=== Overall Campaign ===
The Japanese was able to occupy Pingxingguan and inflict many times more casualties on the Nationalist army. The 'history of the Anti-Japanese War' put the ratio of casualties between the Japanese and Nationalist armies at 1 to 13.38. After the battle, both sides prepared for the next stage of the battle of Taiyuan at Xinkou. Professor Jiang Keshi believed that the Eighth Group Army performed much better in the battle, as the 6,000 Eighth Route Army soldiers killed or wounded 240 Japanese soldiers in a day compared to the 60,000 Shanxi-Suiyuan army soldiers who killed or wounded 1,266 Japanese soldiers in a week of fighting. However, he also criticized the propagandizing of the ambush to the point of negating the role of the Shanxi-Suiyuan army in the battle of Pingxingguan, which also fought in bloody battles for a week at Pingxingguan and Ruyuekou. The Japanese army also referred to the battle of Pingxingguan against the Nationalists as a hard battle.

== Commemoration ==
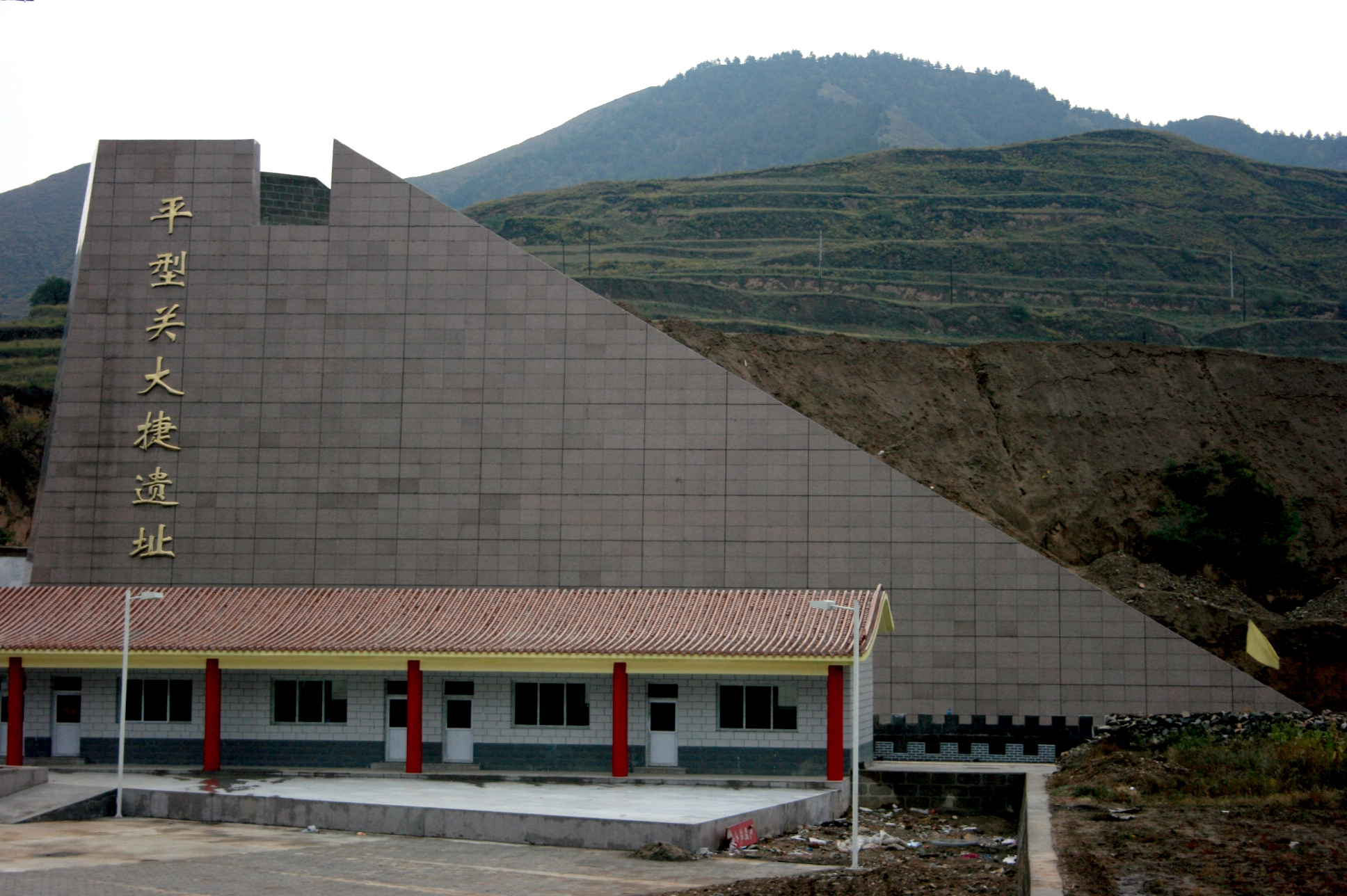
Pingxingguan Grand Victory Relics

The Pingxingguan battlefield site, which encompasses Laoyemiao, was classified in 1961 as one of the inaugural Major Historical and Cultural Sites Protected at the National Level in China. It emerged as one of the earliest acknowledged heritage sites of the Anti-Japanese War. The primary scenic area comprises five essential zones: Pingxingguan Pass, Battle Memorial Hall, Qiaogou major battlefield, Laoyemiao, and Dengfengmiao.

Multiple phases of focused conservation initiatives have been executed to maintain and rehabilitate the historical integrity of the site. In 2014, the National Cultural Heritage Administration spent 5.98 million yuan to reconstruct the Pingxingguan gate city in the architectural style of the Ming Dynasty, drawing inspiration from Yanmen Pass and Niangzi Pass, therefore reconstructing the military fortification that was obliterated in 1939. In 2017, an extra 3.5 million yuan was allocated for the restoration of 11 sites, including the Laoyemiao battlefield and signal towers, along with enhancements to the surrounding environment. A memorial monument was established at the Qiaogou battlefield, while structural enhancements were conducted at the Laoyemiao site.

== See also ==
- Order of battle of the Battle of Pingxingguan
