= Sahi =

Sahi may refer to:

- Sahi (software), a software testing tool
- Sahi clan, a social group of South Asia

== People with the name ==
- Amarjit Singh Sahi, Indian politician from Punjab
- Bhanu Pratap Sahi, Indian politician from Jharkhand
- Chaudhry Muhammad Afzal Sahi (born 1949), Pakistani politician from Punjab
- Deepa Sahi (born 1962), Indian actress and producer
- Fateh Bahadur Sahi, a former ruler of Hathwa state
- Ghulam Rasool Sahi (born 1944), Pakistani politician from Punjab
- K. Rai Sahi, Indian Canadian executive
- Krishna Sahi, Indian politician from Bihar
- Nusrat Iqbal Sahi (born 1950), Pakistani athlete
- Sukhjit Kaur Sahi, Indian politician from Punjab
- Sahi Ram (born 1959), Indian politician from Delhi

== See also ==
- Sahi school health programme, in the UAE
- Sahih, a term in Islam
- Shahi (disambiguation)
- SAH (disambiguation)
- Shah (disambiguation)
- Šahy, a town in Slovakia
