= Sha =

Sha or SHA may refer to:

== Places ==
- Sha County, Fujian, China
- Shanghai Hongqiao International Airport (IATA code SHA)
- Shanghai railway station (Pinyin code SHA)
- Sia, Cyprus, also spelled Sha
- Sagamihara Housing Area, an army installation in Japan

== People ==
- Sha (surname)
- Sha (singer) (born 1979), German singer
- Sha Carter (born 2000), American basketball player
- Sha Fei (1912–1950), Chinese photojournalist

== Language ==
- Sha language
- Sha (Cyrillic) (Ш, ш), a Cyrillic letter
- Śa (Indic), a character in Brahmic scripts
- Ṣa (Indic), a character in Brahmic scripts
- Sha (Armenian letter)

== Government and organizations ==
- Social Health Authority (Kenya), the Kenyan state corporation responsible for the provision and management of public health insurance
- Maryland State Highway Administration
- Strategic health authorities, a former type of administrative organisation of the NHS in England
- Saskatchewan Hockey Association, now known as Hockey Saskatchewan
- Secondary Heads Association, now the Association of School and College Leaders
- Society for Historical Archaeology
- The Socialist Health Association, English medical association

== History ==
- Scriptores Historiae Augustae

== Science and technology ==
- Secure Hash Algorithms, SHA-0 to SHA-3
- Shorthand abstraction, a term presented in the 2007 book What Is Intelligence? by James R. Flynn
- Sidereal hour angle, in astronomy
- Intel SHA extensions
- Measure of material hardness using a Shore A type Shore durometer

== Other uses ==
- Sha (animal), the totemic animal of the Egyptian god Set
- Sha (comics), a French comic by Pat Mills
- Shareholders' agreement, or stockholders' agreement
- Stableford Handicap Adjustment, a component of the Golf Australia Handicap System

== See also ==
- Sha Sha (album), by Ben Kweller
- Shah (disambiguation)
- Shaa (disambiguation)
- Shasha (disambiguation)
