= Drift Racing Team =

(India) Drift Racing Team
- Drift Racing Team - Performance is passion
- Place: Jamshedpur, India
- Founded: 2009
- Founders: (India) Turam Purty, (India) Saikat Sardar
- Faculty Advisor: (India) Mr. Shaliendra Kumar (2009–2011); Mr. Parmanand kumar (current)
- Team Captain: (India) Aditya Swami
- Vice Captain: (India) Rodur Rajak
- Website: drtracing.vercel.app
- Facebook: www.facebook.com/nitjsrDRT

Drift Racing Team is the Formula ISIE Team of NIT Jamshedpur. It is a Student-led initiative in the institute to design, manufacture and race a Formula style F3 Electric car in various Formula ISIE events across the globe. It was founded in 2009 by Automobile enthusiasts, earlier one of the first SAE teams of the institute. Its current goal is to participate in the event of ISIE 6th Formula Imperial HVC- Electric Vehicle Category in the year 2020 to be held at Buddh International Circuit, Greater Noida.

== Achievements ==
- Formula Student India, 2018
  - Overall 35th rank among a total of 112 teams from all across India.
- Formula Student India 2016
  - 9th in cost and manufacturing event.
  - Applauded for Real Case Scenario.
  - Participated in all three static events.
- Formula Design Challenge, 2015
  - 2nd lightest car and 6th in Business Presentation.
- Formula Student United Kingdom 2011
  - 5th in Airbus Teamwork Award among 133 teams from all over the world.
- Formula SAE Australasia 2010
  - 1st in Cost Event and Presentation.
- Formula SAE India Design Challenge 2009
  - 2nd Runner up Overall.

== Racing seasons ==
=== Season 2019-2020 ===
Car Name	DR820e
Car Type	4-Wheel Single Cockpit Formula Style
Frame Construction	Mild Steel Tubular Space Frame using SAE 1040
Outer Bodywork	Customized Glass-Fibre reinforced Plastic
Wheel base	1700mm
Track width	1300mm
Suspension	4-Wheel independent Push-Rod actuated Double A-Arm
Weight	225 kg
Transmission	Chain Drive ( Customized open Differential )
Tires	JK tire ULTIMA XT Dry R13 tires
Motor	Highly efficient BLDC Axial Flux Motor
Battery	Self Assembled Accumulator Unit

=== Season 2015-2016 ===
Car Name	DR516
Car type	4-wheel single cockpit formula style
Frame construction	Mild steel tubular space using SAE 1080
Outer bodywork	Self-made Aluminum bodywork
Wheel base	1620mm
Track width	1270mm
Gear system	Manual gear shifting
Suspension	4-wheel independent push-rod actuated double A-arm
Weight	220 kg
Transmission	Chain drive (open differential)
Steering system	Customised with Steering ratio - 6:1
Tires	JK tire ULTIMA XT Dry R13 tires
Engine	Bajaj Pulsar 220cc engine
Fuel Injection	Carburetor

=== Season 2014-2015 ===
Car Name	DR415
Car type	4-wheel single cockpit formula style
Frame construction	Mild steel tubular space frame
Dimensions(L/W/H)	2500mm 1545mm 1180mm
Wheel base	1700mm
Gear system	Manual gear shifting
Suspension	4-wheel independent push-rod actuated double A-arm
Weight	250 kg
Transmission	Chain drive (open differential)
Steering system	Customised
Tires	JK tire ULTIMA XT Dry R13 tires
Engine	Bajaj Pulsar 220cc engine
Fuel Injection	Carburetor

=== Season 2010-2011 ===
Drift Racing Team with DR211, at Silverstone Circuit, United Kingdom

Car Name	DR211
Engine	Honda CBR 600 cc MPFI
Weight	300 kg
Front suspension	Double A-arm Wishbone
Rear suspension	Double A-arm Wishbone
Differential	Chain Differential
Max power	77 bhp @ 8500 rpm
Max torque	52 Nm @ 5000 rpm
