= Shahi =

Shahi may refer to:

== Dynasties ==
- Adil Shahi dynasty
- Barid Shahi dynasty, which ruled the Bidar Sultanate
- Hussain Shahi dynasty
- Ilyas Shahi dynasty
- Imad Shahi dynasty, which ruled the Berar Sultanate
- Kabul Shahi (disambiguation) dynasty
  - Turk Shahi dynasty
  - Hindu Shahi dynasty
- Nizam Shahi dynasty, which ruled the Ahmadnagar Sultanate
- Qutb Shahi dynasty
- Shahi Bangalah, another name for the Bengal Sultanate

== People ==
- Sahi clan or Shahi, a clan of Muslim, Khatri (kshatri) and Sikh Jats found in Punjab region of Pakistan and India
- Agha Shahi (1920–2006), Pakistani foreign minister
- Laliteshwar Prasad Shahi (1920–2018), Congress party politician from Bihar
- Ram Vinay Shahi, electrical company executive
- Riaz Ahmed Gohar Shahi (born 1941), Muslim Sufi author, spiritual leader and founder of the spiritual movement Anjuman Serfaroshan-e-Islam
- Sarah Shahi (born 1980), TV actress

== Other uses ==
- Shahi, Uttar Pradesh, a town in Bareilly District, India
- Name of the town Qaem Shahr in northern Iran until 1979
- Shahi Bridge, (ce 1567) in Jaunpur, India

== See also ==
- Sahi (disambiguation)
- Shah (disambiguation)
