= Battle of Pingxingguan order of battle =

This is the Battle of Pingxingguan order of battle during the Second Sino-Japanese War.

== China ==
Chinese units mentioned defending Pingxingguan: [1]

- 6th Army Group - Yang Ai-yüan
  - 33rd Army - Sun Ch'u
    - 3rd Independent Brigade - Chang Chen-yü
    - 8th Independent Brigade - Meng Hsien-chi
  - 34th Army - Yang Ai-yüan (concurrent)
    - 196th Brigade - Chiang Yü-chen
    - 203rd Brigade - Liang Chien-t'ang †
    - 71st Division - Kuo Tsung-fen
      - 202nd Brigade - Ch'en Kuang-tou
      - 214th Brigade - Chao Chin
    - New 2nd Division - Chin Hsien-chang
- 7th Army Group - Fu Tso-i
  - 35th Army - Fu Tso-i (concurrent)
    - 211th Brigade - Sun Lan-feng
    - 218th Brigade - Tung Ch'i-wu
  - 61st Army - Ch'en Ch'ang-chieh
    - 101st Division - Li Chün-kung
      - 201st Brigade - Wang P'i-jung
      - 213th Brigade
    - 7th Independent Brigade - Ma Yen-shou
    - 434th Regiment - Ch'eng Chi-hsien
- 17th Army - Kao Kuei-tse (from 7th Group Army)
  - 84th Division - Kao Kuei-tse (concurrent)
    - 250th Brigade - Liu Ta-lu
    - 251st Brigade - Kao Chien-pai
  - 21st Division - Li Hsien-chou
    - 61st Brigade - Ts'ui Chen-tung
    - 63rd Brigade - Lü Hsiang-yün
- 73rd Division - Liu Feng-pin (from 33rd Army)
  - 197th Brigade - Wang En-t'ien
  - 212th Brigade - Ko Wan-pang
- 15th Army - Liu Mao-en
  - 64th Division - Wu Ting-lin
    - 191st Brigade - Hsing Chung-ch'ing
    - 192nd Brigade - Yang T'ien-min
  - 65th Division - Liu Mao-en (concurrent)
    - 194th Brigade - T'ao Pei-ch'en
    - 195th Brigade - Ma Ch'i-chen
- 19th Army - Wang Ching-kuo
  - 70th Division - Wang Ching-kuo (concurrent)
  - 215th Brigade - Tu Kun
  - 72nd Division - Tuan Shu-hua
    - 217th Brigade - Liang Ch'un-p'u
    - 209th Brigade - Tuan Shu-hua (concurrent)
- Artillery Command - Liu Chen-heng
  - 23rd Artillery Regiment - Li Hsi-chiu
  - 28th Artillery Regiment - Tung Tse-shan
  - 24th Artillery Regiment
  - 27th Artillery Regiment
- 115th Division – Lin Biao, deputy Nie Rongzhen (from 18th Army Group – 8th Route Army)
  - 343th Brigade - Zhou Jianping
    - 685th Regiment – Yang Dezhi
    - 686th Regiment - Li Tienyou
  - 344th Brigade - Xu Haidong
    - 687th Regiment - Zhang Shaodong
    - 688th Regiment – ? (in reserve)
- 7th Group, (light bombers/scout-attack reconnaissance), O2U Corsair Scouting-Attack planes, O-2M Reconnaissance-Attack planes - Ch'en Ch'i-hsia

== Japan ==
Attacking Pingxingguan:

- 21st Brigade, 5th Japanese Division

Japanese forces in the ambush battle of Pingxingguan:

- 3rd Battalion, 21st Regiment, 21st Brigade, 5th Japanese Division
- Supply troops of the 21st Regiment - Lieutenant 高桥义夫
  - 15 supply troops and 70 escorts in 70 horse-drawn vehicles with 50 horses, filled with clothes, food, ammunition and proceeded westwards towards Pingxingguan.
- Japanese 6th Depot
  - 2nd Company motorized supply column - First Lieutenant 矢岛俊彦
    - 176 men in 50 trucks
  - 3rd Company motorized supply column - Major 中西次八
    - ? men in 30 trucks

== Sources ==
- [1] Hsu Long-hsuen and Chang Ming-kai, History of The Sino-Japanese War (1937-1945) 2nd Ed., 1971. Translated by Wen Ha-hsiung, Chung Wu Publishing; 33, 140th Lane, Tung-hwa Street, Taipei, Taiwan Republic of China.
- Description (in Chinese) of the Battle of Pingxingguan in the on line version of the book: 中国抗日战争正面战场作战记 (China's Anti-Japanese War Combat Operations) by 郭汝瑰 (Guo Rugui), Jiangsu People's Publishing House, 2005-7-1, ISBN 7214030349
  - 华北作战平型关大捷 1(North China Battles, the Pingxingguan victory 1)
  - 华北作战平型关大捷 2(North China Battles, the Pingxingguan victory 2)
- a more recent study (in Chinese) 关于平型关战斗的史实重建问题 "On the reconstruction of the facts of the Battle of Pingxingguan" by Professor Yang Kui Song
  - A partial translation of Prof. Yang Kui Songon's article on Axis History Forum: The Battle of Pingxinguan 1937
- Pingxingguan Campaign

旧日军档案中的平型关大捷
