= Wasmund =

Wasmund is a surname. Notable people with the surname include:

- Billy Wasmund (1887–1911), American football player and coach
- Shaa Wasmund, British businesswoman
