= Guangling =

Guangling may refer to:

- A historical name of Yangzhou, Jiangsu, China
  - Guangling District (广陵区), the historical center of Yangzhou
  - Guangling Commandery (廣陵郡), historical commandery of China centered in present-day Yangzhou
- Guangling County (广灵县), in Shanxi, China

== See also ==
- Guanling Buyei and Miao Autonomous County (关岭布依族苗族自治县), in Guizhou, China
