= Shaji =

Shaji may refer to:

- Shaji, Guangzhou, area of the city opposite Shamian Island
- Shaji, Jiangsu (沙集镇), town in Suining County
- Shaji (given name), an Indian male given name
  - Shaji (cinematographer), Indian film cinematographer
- Shaji, titular character of the 2019 Indian film Mera Naam Shaji

== See also ==
- Shah (disambiguation)
