= Shaa =

Shaa may refer to:

== People ==
- Edmund Shaa, goldsmith, Sheriff and Lord Mayor of London
- John Shaa, goldsmith, nephew of Edmund, joint Master of the Mint, Sheriff and Lord Mayor of London
- Ralph Shaa, 15th-century English theologian
- Shaa Wasmund, a British businesswoman
- Shaa, original illustrator of Nogizaka Haruka no Himitsu

== See also ==
- Shah (disambiguation)
- Sha (disambiguation)
