= Shahu =

Shahu may refer to:

- Shahu I, Maratha king
- Shahu II of Satara, Maratha king
- Rajarshi Chhatrapati Shahu Maharaj of Kolhapur (1874-1922), Raja and Maharaja of Indian princely state of Kolhapur
- Shahu II of Kolhapur (born 1948), ceremonial Maharaja of Kolhapur
- Shahu, Iran, a city in Ravansar County, Kermanshah province, Iran
- Shahu District, an administrative division of Ravansar County, Kermanshah province, Iran
- Shahu Rural District, an administrative division of Iran
- Shaho, a mountain located in Hewraman, Kurdistan province, Iran
- Shahu (Sand Lake), a lake (surrounded by Wuchang District) in Hongshan District, Wuhan, Hubei, China
- Shahu, Longganhu Administrative District in Longganhu Administrative District, Huanggang, Hubei, China

== See also ==
- Shah (disambiguation)
- Sahu, an Indian surname
- Saaho, a 2019 Indian action film by Sujeeth
