= Shah (disambiguation) =

Shah (Old Persian XšāyaΘiya) is the Persian word for "King", mainly used in Iran/Persia.

Shah may also refer to:

== Arts and media ==
- Shah (film), a 2015 Pakistani biopic about Olympian boxer Syed Hussain Shah
- The Shah (book), a 2011 biography of the last Shah of Iran, by Abbas Milani
- Shah of Shahs (book), a 1982 book by Ryszard Kapuściński

== People ==
- Mohammad Reza Pahlavi (1919–1980), the last Shah of Iran; often referred to simply as "the Shah"
- Shah (surname), a list of people with the surname that is common in India and Pakistan
- Shah Bano Begum, party to the landmark 1985 Supreme Court of India case Mohd. Ahmed Khan v. Shah Bano Begum
- Shah Jalal (1271–1346), Sufi Muslim figure in Bengal
- Shah Rukh Khan (born 1965), Indian film actor
- Salman Shah (disambiguation)
- Raline Shah (born 1985), Indonesian actress

== Geographic places ==
- Shah, Ras al-Khaimah, a settlement in Ras al-Khaimah
- Shah, Fars, a village in Fars Province, Iran

== Other uses ==
- Shah dynasty, a ruling dynasty of the Gorkha Kingdom until 1768 AD and Nepal until 2008 AD
- Ukrainian shah, a historical currency of Ukraine
- Dirac comb distribution, also called Shah function
- Shah Buruj, a historical tower in Ambajogai, Maharashtra

== See also ==
- Iranian rial, with historical variety named shahi or chahi
- Sha (disambiguation)
- Shaa (disambiguation)
- Shaw (disambiguation)
- Shahanshah (disambiguation)
- Shahu (disambiguation)
- Shaji (disambiguation)
- Shahi (disambiguation)
- Kabul Shahi (disambiguation)
- Sahi (disambiguation)
- Šah (disambiguation)
- SAH (disambiguation)
- List of monarchs of Persia (the Shahs)
