= Ojass =

Annual techno-management fest

Ojass, NIT Jamshedpur
- Status: Active
- Genre: Techno-Management Fest
- Date: 5 April 2024 - 7 April 2024
- Frequency: Annually
- Venue: National Institute of Technology Jamshedpur
- Locations: Jamshedpur, India
- Country: India
- Founded: 2004
- Major events: DEUS-X-MACHINA, PRODUS
- Organiser: Students' Council of NIT Jamshedpur
- Prize money: 11 Lakhs
- Website: https://www.ojass.org/

Ojass is the annual techno-management fest of NIT Jamshedpur. Started in the year 2004, Ojass strives to foster and boost cogent engineering practices in the nation providing a zealous platform to display one's technical prowess.

Ojass assembles a wide range of events comprising every genre of engineering, management, and even filmmaking with the aim to stimulate the future generation to dream big. Certified Workshops in the field of robotics are conducted every year before the fest to help students understand the different technology trends in the market. A three-day spectacle, Ojass also organizes many motivating guest lectures under the event cluster "Guru Gyan". Ojass 2015 was held from 3 April to 5 April 2015. Ojass 2016 was held from 11 March to 13 March 2016. Since its inception, Ojass has been receiving immense participation from the student community from all over India.

== History and Growth ==
Initiated in the year 2004, It was celebrated as Pravah until 2007 when it got its present name Ojass, meaning "vigour". Since then, the fest has grown exponentially attracting students from all corners of the country especially from the eastern corridor. The 2014 edition saw healthy participation, participants taking part in a variety of events.

== Flagship Events ==
NSCET: A Tata Cummins sponsored technical paper presentation.

Codemania: A CodeChef sponsored and certified coding event.

No Ground Zone: A remote-control plane event where the plane should perform certain maneuvers. Prize money for this event is worth up to Rs 80,000.

Netkraft: An event on networking basics and trends with prize money worth up to Rs 12,000.

Bizzathlon 2.0: A business quiz conducted by the renowned Quiz master Barry O'Brien.

Guru Gyan: Inspiring guest lectures by famous personalities from all over the country.

Director's Cut: A film-making adobe where the future filmmakers of the country showcase their skills.

The Great Ojass Race: A treasure-hunt event where the participants' race through the campus in search of clues leading to the next checkpoint.

Autobots: Design a robot capable of traversing through the arena detecting and following the designated path. The total prize money for this event is Rs 25000.

Game Of Troves: A Game which takes participants beyond Google in search of clues. In-game participants have to submit words related to a given image, text, or audio

== Guest Lectures ==
Every year Ojass invites renowned personalities to share their experience and valuable insights. The Guests for Ojass 2014 include:

Mandira Bedi: An Indian actress, television presenter and sports commentator.

Ravinder Singh: A celebrated Indian author.

Narasimha Karumanchi: An educationist and a self-publishing author of books on Datastructures and Algorithms.

== Workshops ==
Ojass conducts workshops as a prologue to the various events in the different event clusters in the fest. This helps the students to understand the status quo and the future advancements possible in a particular field. Especially, workshops on the several robotics events in the Deus-x-machina event cluster attract huge participation from the students of the locality. These workshops allow the students to know the nitty-gritty of the robotics domain. Students also get a chance to bag internship offers from renowned organizations.
