= Šah =

Šah may refer to:

- Chess, a board game, Šah in alternative language
- Shah, a Persian term for a king
