= Sha (singer) =

- Born: Grazia di Fresco; 7 May 1979 (age 46)
- Origin: Schwieberdingen, Germany
- Genres: Pop, Dance, R'n'B,
- Occupation: Singer
- Years active: 2001–present
- Labels: EMI (2006–present); Media29 (2009; short period); Sony Music Entertainment (2010)
- Website: Sha-Music.de

Grazia di Fresco, better known by her stage name Sha, is a German singer of Italian descent who rose to fame in the summer of 2006 with her debut single "JaJa".

== Formation ==
Sha grew up in Schwieberdingen near Stuttgart. After finishing school in the year 2000 at the Hans Grüninger High School in Markgröningen she moved to Munich and published in 2001 as artist Grazia on an indie label, the song Rome or Paris. The song was not a commercial success. Five years later she wrote a record contract with major label EMI.

== Subsequent career ==
Her debut single "JaJa" was released in the beginning of August 2006 and charted right away on the German and Austrian music charts. The song is a cover version of the 1990 hit "Ice Ice Baby" of American rapper Vanilla Ice, for which new German lyrics were written by its producer Ole Wierk. In February 2007, Sha released her second single, the electro-/synthpop song "Vergiss Mich", which is notable for its use of synthesizers.

On 24 August 2007, a double A-side single "Respect the Girls / Verdammt ich lieb dich" was released. There are videos for both songs. "Respect the Girls" was recorded as a part of the action of the German magazine BRAVO Girl, while "Verdammt ich lieb dich" is a cover of the German Schlager singer Matthias Reim. On 25 August, Sha was at the Brandenburger Tor in Berlin, supporting the Schau nicht weg! action of BRAVO and VIVA against school violence. On 31 August, her first album, Kein Scheiß!, was released.

Sha subsequently signed a North American deal with Toucan Cove Entertainment in March 2008 which will re-formulate Kein Scheiss! with all-English versions of many of the songs coupled with several brand new tracks for summer of 2008 release.

=== Albums ===
| Year | Song | Chart-Position | | |
| Year | Song | DE | AT | CH |
|---|---|---|---|---|
| 2007 | Kein Scheiss! | 41 | 64 | – |
