= Sha Fei =

Chinese photojournalist and war photographer

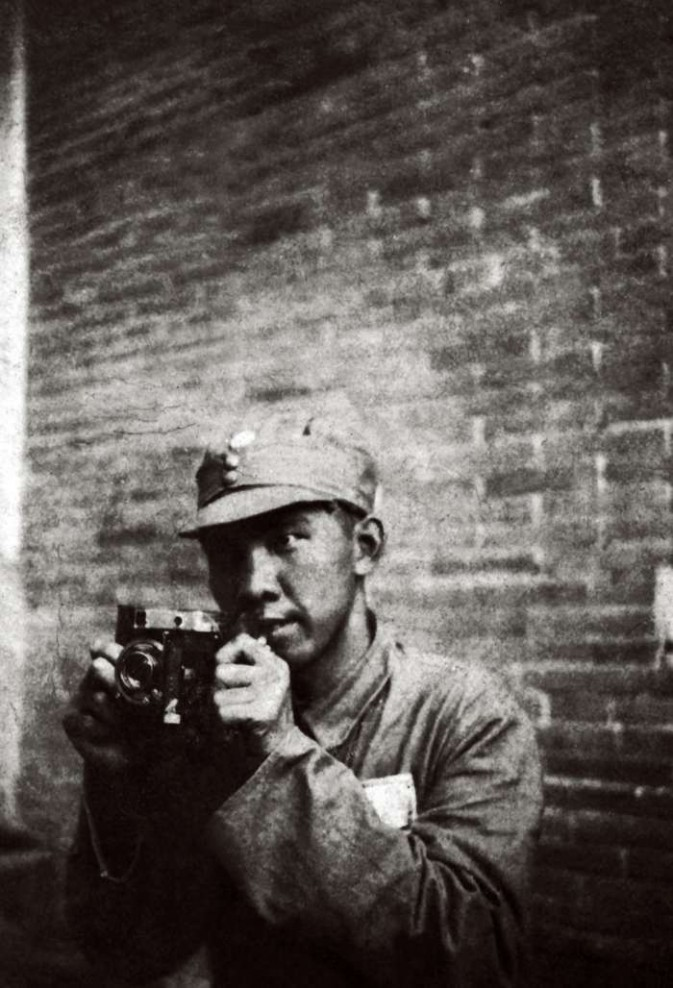
- Sha circa 1944, photographed by his student Gu Di
- Born: Situ Chuan (司徒传); May 5, 1912; Guangzhou, Guangdong, China
- Died: March 4, 1950 (aged 37); Shijiazhuang, Hebei, China
- Resting place: Hebei Hero and Martyr Memorial Park, Shijiazhuang
- Education: Shanghai Fine Arts Academy
- Occupation: Photojournalist
- Spouse: Wang Hui (1933–1937; 1945–1950, his death)
- Children: Situ Fei (Wang Dali); Situ Ying (Wang Xiaoli); Wang Yan; Wang Yiqiang; Wang Shaojun
- Website: www.shafei.cn

Sha Fei (simplified Chinese: 沙飞; traditional Chinese: 沙飛; May 5, 1912 – March 4, 1950) was a Chinese photojournalist and war photographer best known for his work with the Chinese Communist Party during the Second Sino-Japanese War (1937–45). Born Situ Chuan (司徒传), he took the pseudonym Sha Fei (flying sand), that is, a grain of sand in the sky of his country. He has been called "one of the most admired Leftist photographers in China during the wartime years of 1937–1949", and "one of the most influential photographers of his generation". His "warm, dramatic, and ideologically-charged photographic presentations were emulated for decades thereafter".

== Early years ==
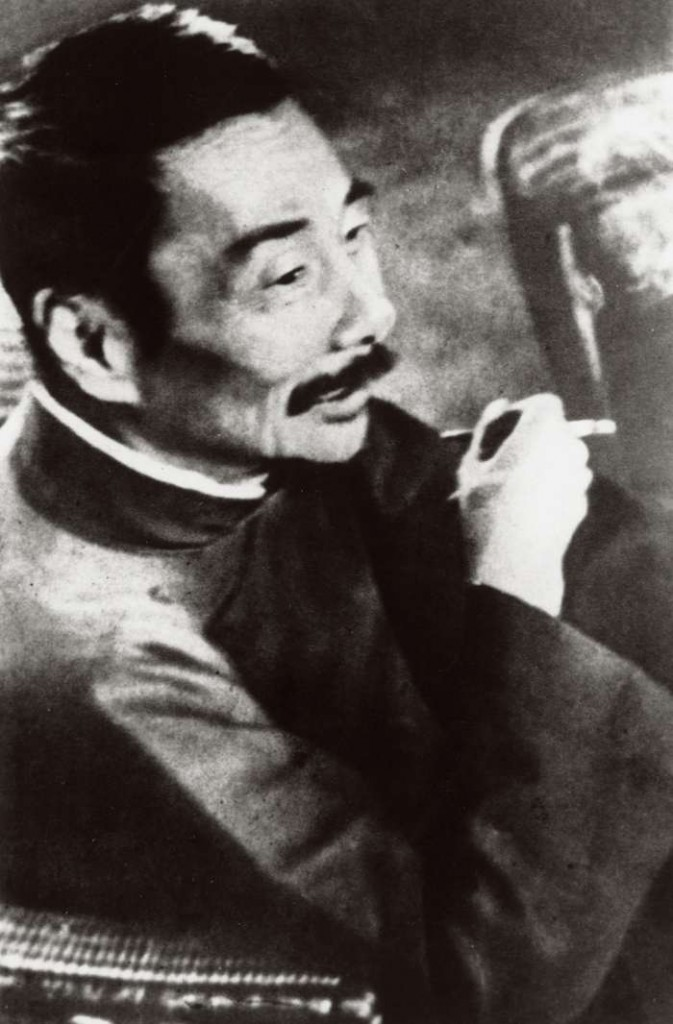
Lu Xun 11 days before his death, photographed by Sha Fei

Situ Chuan (Sha Fei) was born in 1912 in Guangzhou (Canton), Guangdong Province. His father, Situ Junxun (司徒俊勋), was a small business owner. Sha Fei felt he needed to learn a trade to support his family when his father's business went under in 1926, and studied at a radio school. In July 1926 he enlisted in the National Revolutionary Army and joined the Northern Expedition as a telegraph operator. He worked at a radio station in Shantou from 1932 to 1936, and became interested in photography, preferring a style more realistic than the international style he saw in magazines. In June 1935, he joined the Shanghai-based Black and White Photographic Society (Chinese: 黑白摄影社; pinyin: Heibai Sheyingshe).

In 1936, he decided to become a professional photographer and quit his job in Shantou. He went to Shanghai, and in the fall entered the Department of Western Painting of the Shanghai Fine Arts Academy. He became well known for his photographs of blind beggars, poverty stricken children, and emaciated peasants. Shanghai was the base of most modern Chinese artists at the time, and he had the opportunities to meet famous people in the cultural circles such as Lu Xun. On 8 October 1936, he took the most famous photograph of Lu Xun's late life at the Second National Woodcut Exhibition. When Lu died 11 days later, he took some of Lu's last photos. These photos, as well as ones taken during Lu's funeral, were widely published in many magazines, including Liangyou (The Young Companion) and Shidai, establishing his reputation as a photojournalist. Sha Fei's photo was later the template for the cover art on Lu Xun's collected works.

== Wartime activities ==
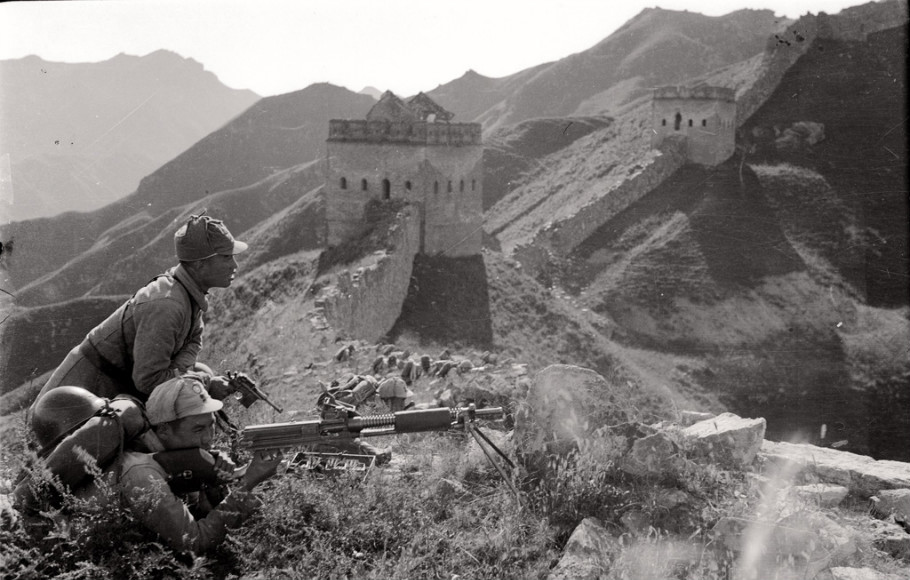
Sha Fei's photo of the Eighth Route Army fighting the Japanese at the Futuyu Great Wall, Laiyuan, Hebei (1938)

Soon after his Lu Xun's images earned him national fame, the Second Sino-Japanese War broke out in 1937 and Sha Fei joined the Communist resistance in northern China. He went to the battlefront and photographed the Battle of Pingxingguan in September. The following month he formally enlisted in the Eighth Route Army, which established a resistance base in the Jin-Cha-Ji (Shanxi-Chahar-Hebei) border region. In November, he was made head of the editorial department of the base's propaganda bureau. He was also appointed head of the Resistance Daily Press (Chinese: 抗敌报社; pinyin: Kangdi Baoshe), the predecessor of the People's Daily, and covered the battles of the Eighth Route Army. He founded the Jin-Cha-Ji Pictorial (Chinese: 晋察冀画报; pinyin: Jin-Cha-Ji Huabao), which first appeared on July 7, 1942.

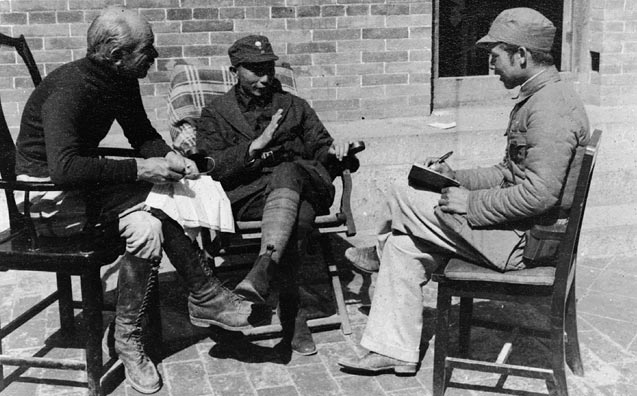
Sha Fei's photo of Norman Bethune and Nie Rongzhen in 1938

He took thousands of photographs of battle scenes, Japanese brutality, common people caught in hard circumstances, high communist leaders, and foreign visitors. More than 200 were published. He also ran classes to train a cohort of photojournalists. In 1938, Canadian doctor Norman Bethune went to Yan'an, the communist headquarters. Sha Fei befriended Bethune and took many photos of him. Bethune bequeathed his camera to Sha Fei when he died in 1939.

After contracting tuberculosis, Sha Fei was sent to Shijiazhuang in May 1948 to be treated at the Norman Bethune Hospital. He was also suffering from mental illness after years of highly stressful work in the war zone. On December 15, 1949, he shot to death a Japanese doctor involved in his treatment. He was convicted of murder and executed two months later, at the age of 37.

Because he was executed for murder, Sha Fei's story was suppressed in China. In 1986, his family appealed the verdict and a military court reinstated his Party membership.

== Reputation and legacy ==
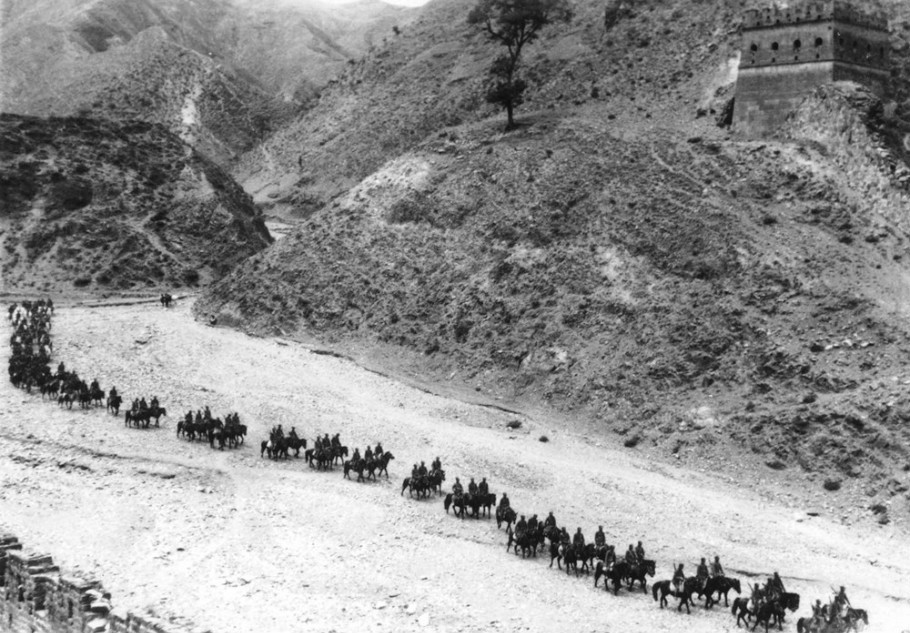
Sha Fei's photo of the Eighth Route Army cavalry in 1937

Scholar Shana Brown wrote that Sha Fei's "images of soldiers crouching on rooftops, peasant armies marching through plumes of dust, and laughing young enlistees, convey an intensity that was the result of close framing devices that plunge the viewer directly into the action". Brown saw in Sha Fei's work both the "kinetic energy" of Cartier-Bresson's street photography and the "rawness" of Robert Capa's combat work, qualities that enable viewers today to "practically smell gunpowder and feel the grit of the battlefield under our feet". Brown also wrote that "although Sha Fei's images eschew the rigidity of much contemporary Communist imagery—a surprising feat given the preponderance of Soviet influence on Chinese visual art from the 1930s onwards—they are still almost always political in nature. Narrating specific instances of military and government action while foregrounding Communist social ideals, they exude optimism and fortitude. Children laugh and smile, young soldiers keep their backs straight under fire, and even Japanese POWs break into song, grateful for the mercy of their Communist captors. The artistry required to make such tableaux appear spontaneous and natural marked Sha Fei as a photographer and propagandist of extraordinary talent."

Sha Fei was careful to preserve and catalog his negatives. He kept those of Lu Xun on himself, which were accidentally buried with him.

Exhibitions of his work in the United States have been held at the Ohio State University (2009), and at the Fairbank Center, Harvard University (March–April 2016). In April 2016, the Fairbank Center held a conference, "The Photographer Who Shaped Modern China: Sha Fei and His World."

Sha Fei's student Gu Di (顾棣), who followed him for seven years, also became a celebrated photographer and won the Lifetime Achievement Award of the China Photographers Association in 2002. Gu credits Sha Fei as the greatest influence in his life.

== Selected works ==
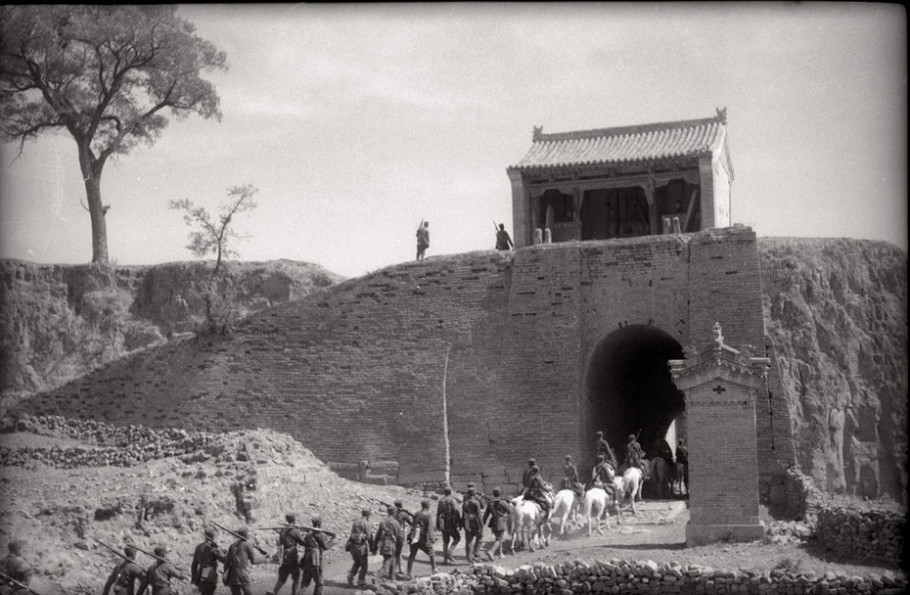
Battle of Pingxingguan, 1937

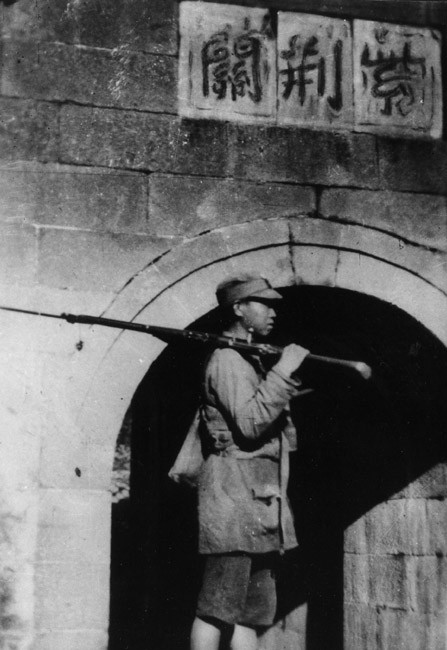
Eighth Route Army soldier at Zijingguan Great Wall, 1937

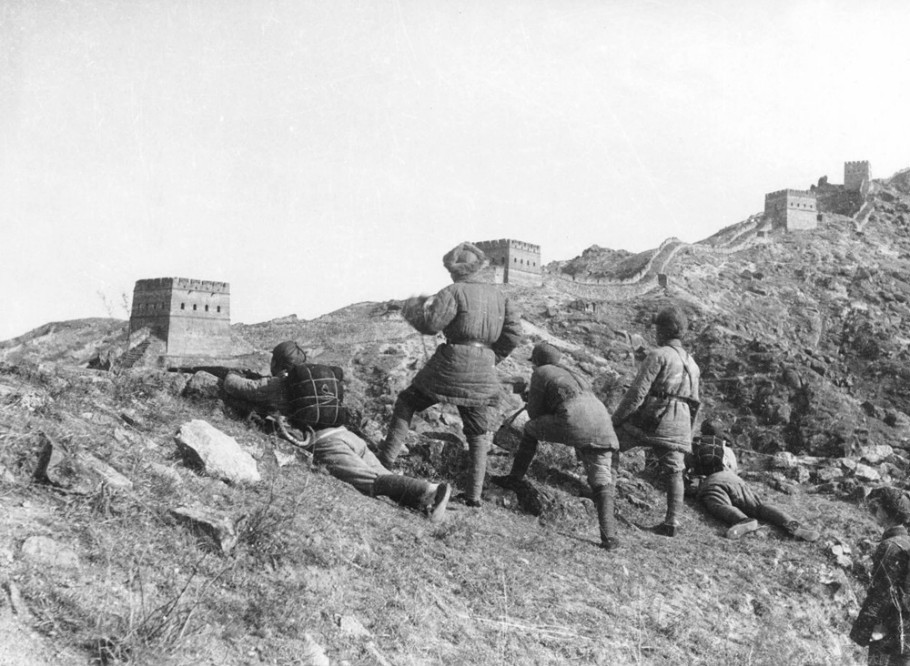
Battle of Chajianling, Great Wall, Laiyuan, Hebei, autumn 1937

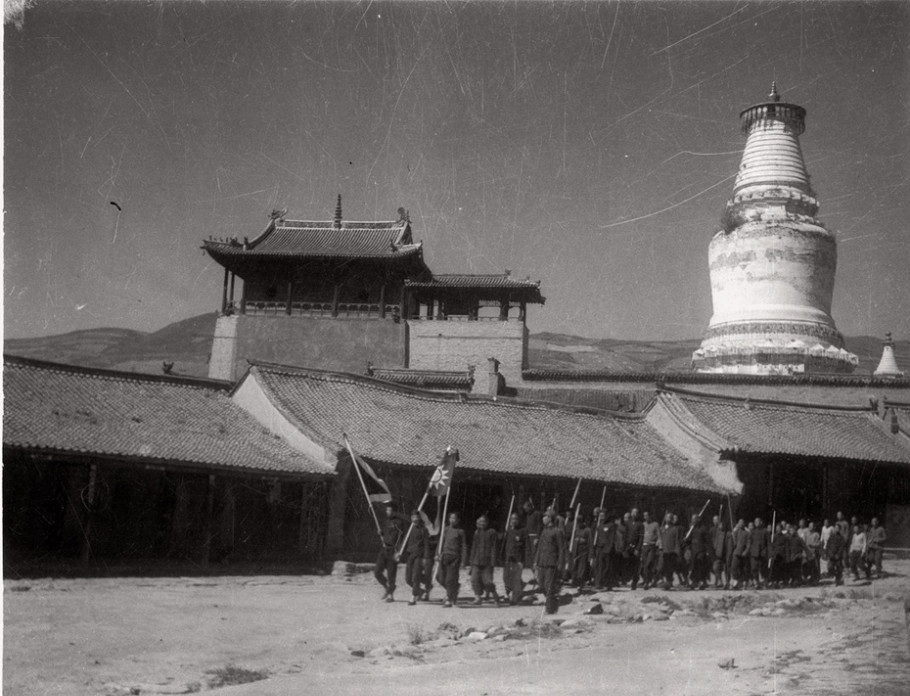
Monk soldiers in Wutai County, 1937

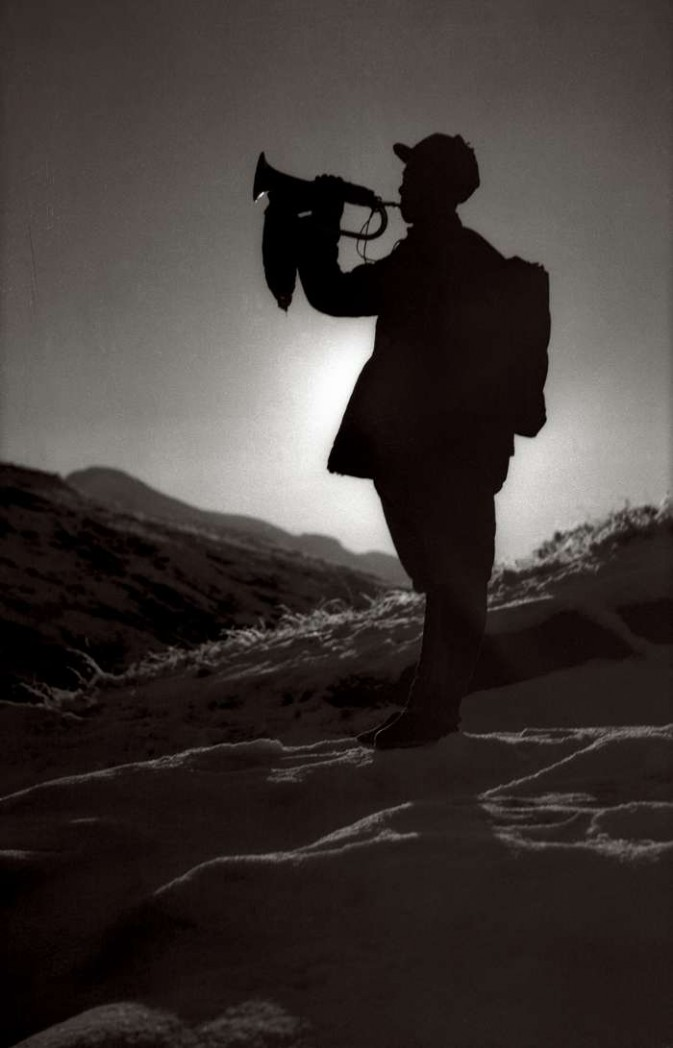
Eighth Route Army bugler, 1942
