= Chamonate Airport =

Airport in Atacama, Chile

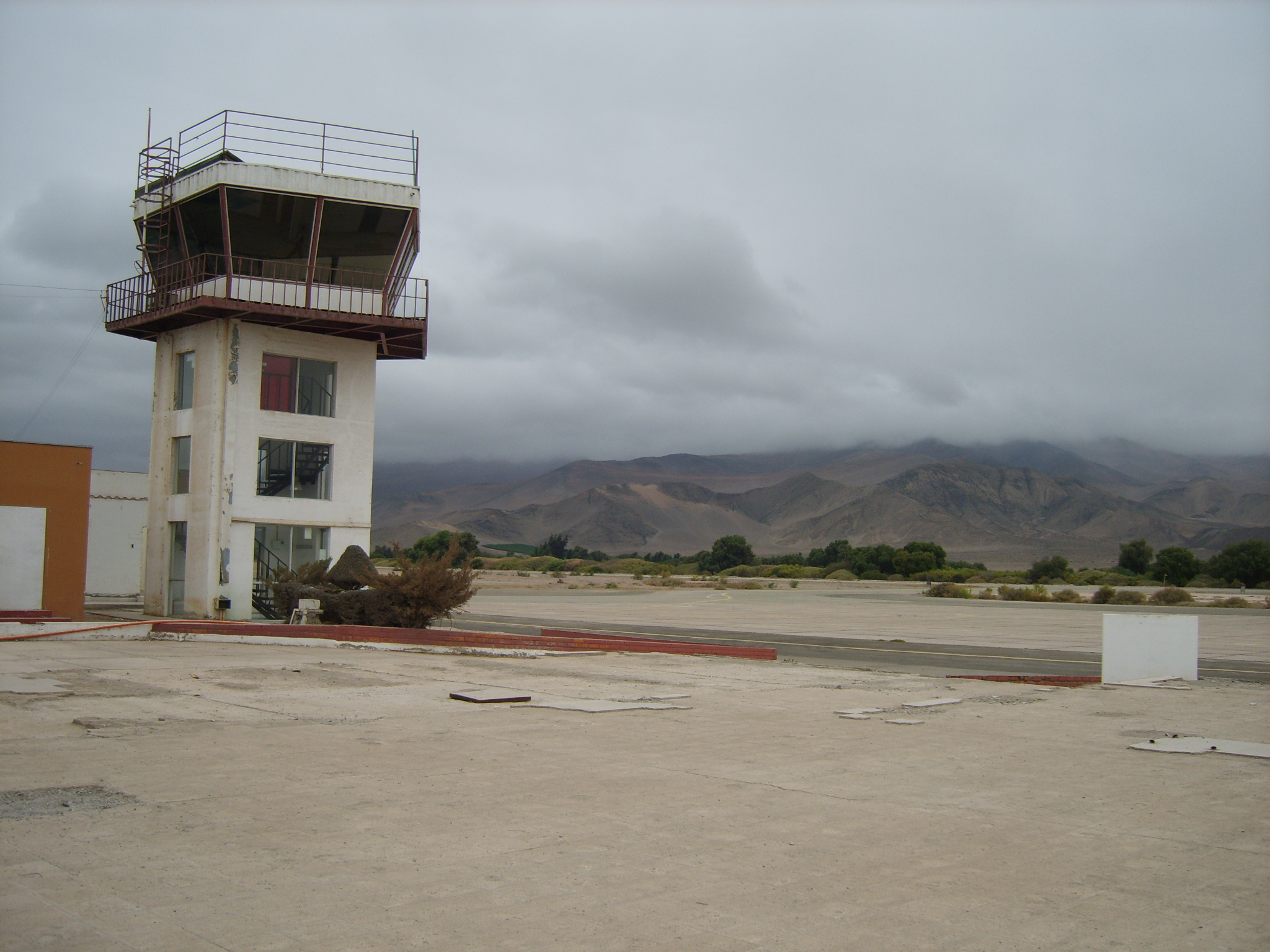
- IATA: none; ICAO: SCHA

Summary
- Airport type: Public
- Serves: Copiapó, Chile
- Elevation AMSL: 954 ft / 291 m
- Coordinates: 27°17′48″S 70°24′50″W

Map
- Location of Chamonate Airport in Chile

Runways
Direction	Length		Surface
Direction	m	ft	Surface
09/27	1,625	5,331	Asphalt
- Source: Landings.com Google Maps GCM

Chamonate Airport (Spanish: Aeródromo Chamonate, (ICAO: SCHA)) is an airport serving Copiapó, the capital of the Atacama Region of Chile. It served as the main airport for the region until February 2005, when Desierto de Atacama Airport opened.

The airport is in the valley of the Copiapó River, 11 kilometres (6.8 mi) downstream from the city. There is rising terrain in all quadrants.

== See also ==
- Transport in Chile
- List of airports in Chile
