= National Institute of Technology, Jamshedpur =

Educational institute in India

- Official Logo
- Other name: NITJSR
- Type: Public
- Established: 1960; 66 years ago
- Affiliations: Ministry of Education, Government of India
- Chairperson: Sunil Alagh
- Director: Goutam Sutradhar
- Faculty: 150
- Administrative staff: 250
- Students: 3,500 +
- Undergraduates: 2,000 +
- Postgraduates: 1,000+
- Doctoral students: 596
- Location: Jamshedpur, Jharkhand, India; 22°46′32″N 86°08′47″E
- Campus: Urban, 325 acres (132 ha)
- Website: www.nitjsr.ac.in

National Institute of Technology Jamshedpur (NIT Jamshedpur or NITJSR) is an Institute of National Importance for Technical Education located at Jamshedpur, Jharkhand, India. Established as a Regional Institute of Technology on 15 August 1960, it was upgraded to National Institute of Technology (NIT) on 27 December 2002 with the status of a Deemed University. It is one of the 31 NITs in India, and as such is directly under the control of the Ministry of Education (MHRD). It is the third in the chain of 8 NITs established as a part of the Second Five Year Plan (1956–61) by the Government of India.

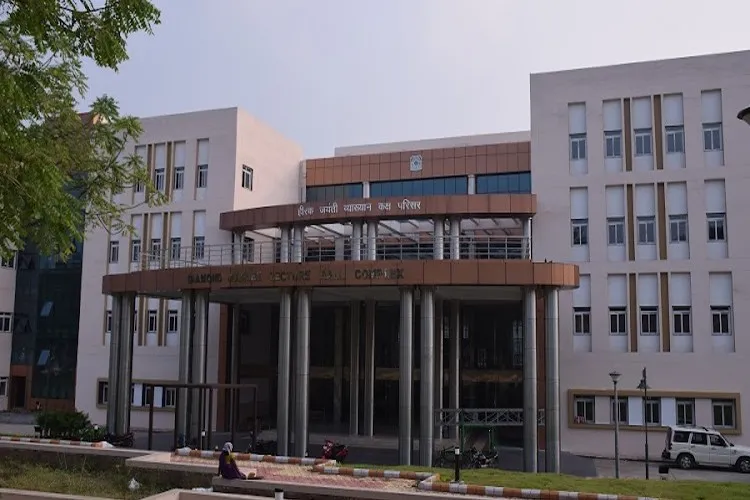
NIT Jamshedpur New Academic Building

== History ==
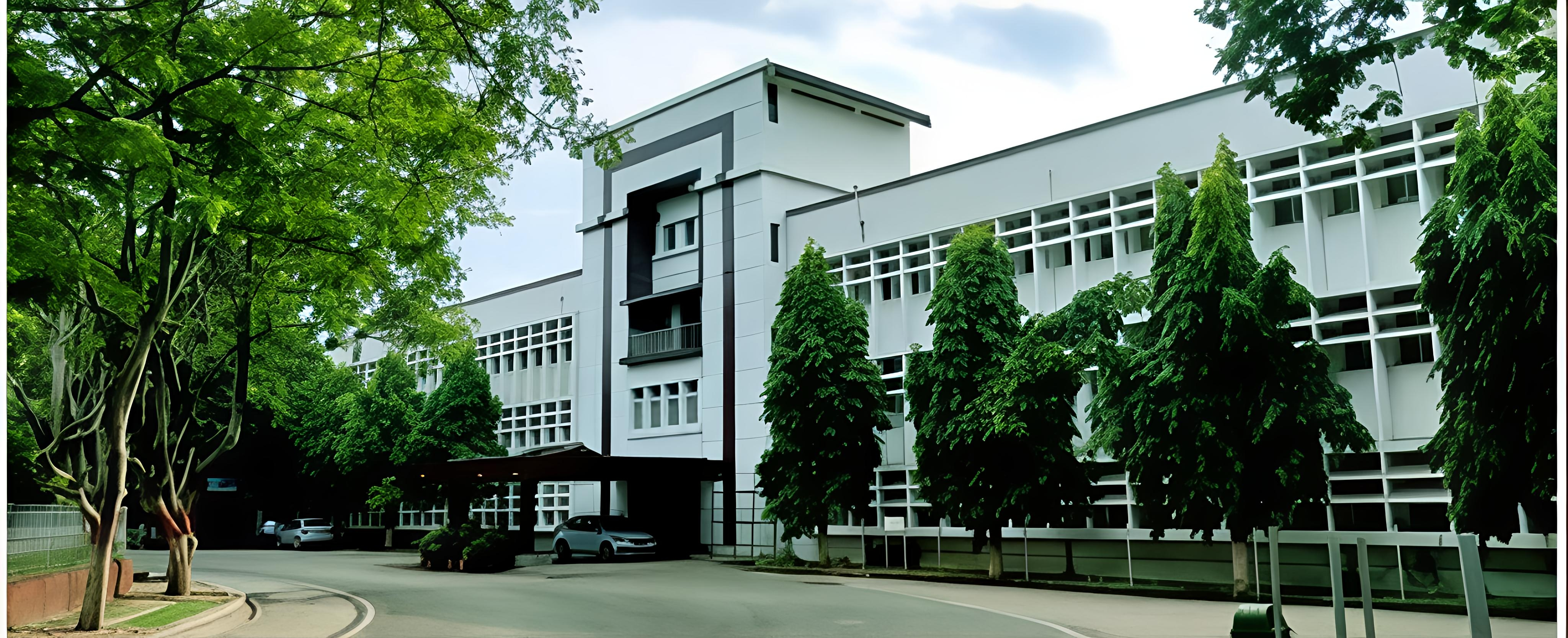
Main Administrative building

National Institute of Technology, Jamshedpur was founded as the Regional Institute of Technology in 1960 by Shri Krishna Singh, the then Chief Minister of the state of Bihar (unpartitioned). The date of 15 August, Independence Day in India, was chosen for the laying of the foundation stone. It was among the first eight Regional Engineering Colleges (RECs) established as part of the Second Five-Year Plan (1956–1961). It now serves as the NIT for the newly carved state of Jharkhand, while NIT Patna serves as the NIT for the state of Bihar.

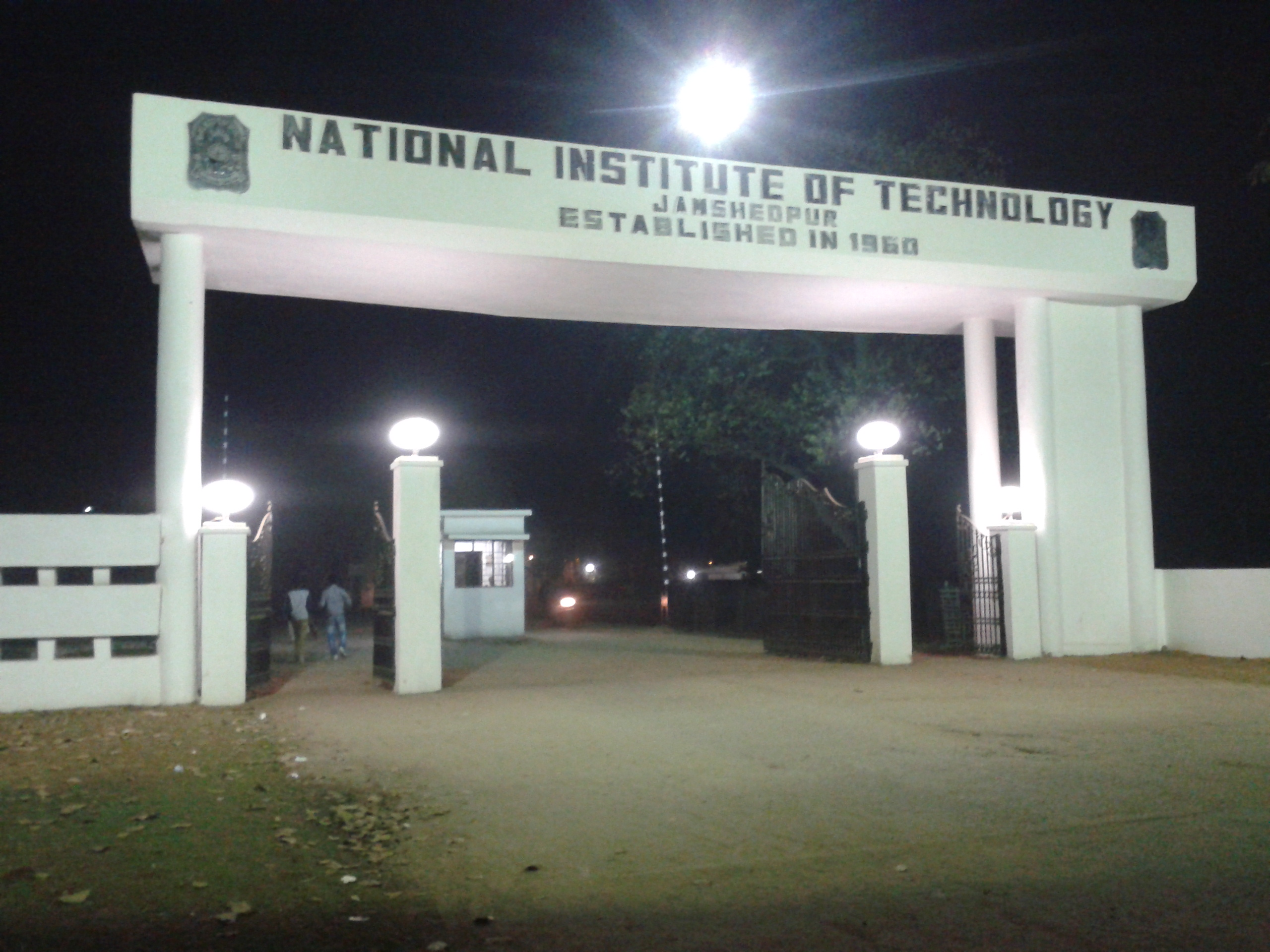
Entrance of NIT, Jamshedpur

== Academics and admission ==
The institute offers a Ph.D. in various streams and twelve semester courses various disciplines. It offers admission in its undergraduates courses of BTech through JEE-Main Entrance Examination, which is the pre-requisite for admission in all NITs.

== Ranking ==
The National Institute of Technology, Jamshedpur was ranked 82nd in India in the Engineering category in the NIRF 2025 rankings.

NIT Jamshedpur is also known for its strong placement performance, as reflected in the latest NIRF-submitted data.

== Festivals ==
There are three annual festivals:

- Ojass, a techno-management festival of the college to showcase the technical and managerial skill of the students.
- Urja, annual athletics sports meet.
- Culfest, annual cultural festival.
- Cognitio, annual festival for Mechanical Engineering students.
- Technica, an annual festival for students of Metallurgical and Materials engineering from all over India
- Vidhaan, a civil branch festival managed by Civil Engineering Society of NIT Jamshedpur.
- NIT Jamshedpur Conference Catalysis and Photocatalysis for Clean Energy (CPCE)
- E-Summit : Annual business and entrepreneurship event of NIT Jamshedpur.

== Notable alumni ==
- Malli Mastan Babu - fastest 7 summiteer in the world
- Kul Man Ghising - Managing director of Nepal Electricity Authority (NEA) known for ending load-shedding
- Ram Vinay Shahi - Chairman of Energy Infratech Private Limited. Former Chairman and Managing Director of Bombay Suburban Electric Supply Limited. Former Secretary to GOI in the ministry of power.

== See also ==
- National Institute of Technology, Rourkela
- National Institute of Technology, Bhopal
- National Institute of Technology, Durgapur
- National Institutes of Technology
- Institute Of National Importance
