= Shaji (given name) =

Shaji (Malayalam: ഷാജി | Hindi: शाजी) is a common south Indian male given name. The most probable etymology is from Old Persian Shah (شاه) "king" and the Hindi honorific suffix ji (जी). Hence "Shah" + "Ji". Notable people with this name include:

- Shaji Chen, Indian writer and actor
- Shaji Choudhary, Indian actor
- Shaji Kailas, Indian film director
- Shaji Kumar, Indian cinematographer
- Shaji N. Karun, Indian film director
- Shaji P. Chaly, High Court Judge
- Shaji Prabhakaran, Senior Consultant for Asian Football Confederation and FIFA
