= Şah Sultan =

Şah Sultan may refer to:

- Şah Sultan (daughter of Bayezid II) (1474–1506), Ottoman princess
- Şah Sultan (daughter of Selim I) (1500–1572), Ottoman princess
- Şah Sultan (daughter of Selim II) (1543–1580) Ottoman princess
- Şah Sultan (daughter of Mehmed III) (1588–1618), Ottoman princess
- Şah Sultan (daughter of Mustafa III) (1761–1803), Ottoman princess
