= Ram Vinay Shahi =

R.V. Shahi is the Chairman of Energy Infratech Private Limited. He previously served as the Secretary to the Government of India in the Ministry of Power and formerly the chairman and managing director of Bombay Suburban Electric Supply Limited.

== Early life and education ==
He graduated in mechanical engineering from the National Institute of Technology, Jamshedpur. He then earned post-graduate degrees: industrial engineering, business management, and a diploma in advanced industrial management (Delft, Holland). He is a Fellow of the World Academy of Productivity Sciences, a Fellow of Institution of Engineers, a Fellow of International Institute of Electrical Engineers, and a Fellow of the Indian National Academy of Engineering.

== Career ==
He was Secretary to the Government of India in the Ministry of Power, India from 2002 to 2007, the longest-serving Power Secretary in Indian history, and the chairman and managing director of Bombay Suburban Electric Supply (BSES) Ltd. from 1994 to 2002 (the predecessor company to Reliance Energy). As chairman and managing director, Shahi is known for transforming BSES Ltd. from a small power utility to one of the largest in the nation. As Secretary of Power, he is widely credited for reforming and revitalizing the Indian power sector through the landmark Electricity Act of 2003, which liberalized the sector and initiated private investment in Indian Power.

Besides being responsible for the entire Indian Power Sector (168,000 megawatts or 225,000,000 horsepower capacity, including captive plants), as Secretary, Shahi was directly responsible for the central public sector undertakings viz. National Thermal Power Corporation (NTPC), Power Grid Corporation of India Limited, National Hydroelectric Power Corporation, Satluj Jal Vidyut Nigam, Tehri Hydro Development Corporation, Power Finance Corporation, Rural Electrification Corporation, Bhakra Beas Management Board and Damodar Valley Corporation. He was also President of the Governing Council of Central Power Research Institute, chairman of the executive committee of Bureau of Energy Efficiency and Chairman of the Governing Council of National Power Training Institute, having 5 large training institutes in various parts of the country. He worked as Secretary to the Government of India for almost five years, until he relinquished the charge on 31 January 2007.

Prior to taking over the Indian Power Sector as Secretary, R.V. Shahi was chairman and managing director of BSES Ltd (the predecessor company to Reliance Energy) from 1994 to 2002, which he transformed from a small distribution utility to a multi–unit fully integrated power utility having generation, transmission and distribution. BSES subsequently became Reliance Energy.

Shahi became Chairman of Energy Infratech Pvt. Limited, an Engineering & Project Development Consulting Company, with a staff of more than 350 people.

During the five-year tenure as Secretary, the Indian electricity sector witnessed a major restructuring of the power industry through formulation and implementation of several legislative and policy initiatives aimed at creation of a competitive market structure. These include the Electricity Act (2003), National Electricity Policy (2005), Electricity Tariff Policy (2006) and Accelerated Power Development Reform Programme (2002). There was also setting and operationalising of Bureau of Energy Efficiency under Energy Conservation Act (2001), Rural Electrification Policy (2005), Ultra Mega Power Project Policy (2006), Merchant Power Plant Policy (2006), the 50,000 MW Hydroelectric Initiative (2003), 100,000 MW Thermal Project Initiative (2004).

== Awards ==
R.V. Shahi was awarded “BEST POWER MAN of the Millennium Year 2000” Award by National Foundation of Indian Engineers.

Other than being on the board of various companies and entities, Shahi sits on the Board of Governors of the Indian Institute of Management (IIM) Lucknow and Institute of Energy Management and Research (IEMR) Gurgaon.

== Publications ==
- "Towards Powering India: Policy Initiatives and Implementation Strategy"
- "Indian Power Sector: Challenge and Response"
