= SAHS =

SAHS may refer to:

- Rincón de los Sauces Airport (ICAO code 'SAHS'), in Neuquén province, Argentina
- St Albans High School for Girls in St Albans, Hertfordshire, UK
- St. Anthony High School (disambiguation)
- St. Augustine High School (disambiguation)
- St. Augustine Historical Society, in St Augustine, Florida, United States
- Santa Ana High School, in Orange County, California, US
- Seoul American High School, in South Korea
- Seoul Arts High School, in Seoul, South Korea
- Sunhwa Arts High School, in Seoul, South Korea
- South Albany High School, in Albany, Oregon, United States
- South Anchorage High School, in Anchorage, Alaska, United States
- Stillwater Area High School, in Oak Park Heights, Minnesota, United States
- Swiss American Historical Society
