= Sahi school health programme =

Sahi (from the Arabic word صاحي meaning healthy) is a non profit school health programme in Ras al-Khaimah, United Arab Emirates initiated in 2011 in collaboration with Arabian Healthcare Group, and the pilot was implemented in September 2012.

== Background ==
Its objectives, services and themes are to promote preventive health services, and improve and promote health and safety-related attributes and behaviors in schools. It will also provide health screenings, health reports, health education workshops, and individual and/or family counselling.

The programme is run by the Arabian Healthcare Group and headed by Francesca Rodgers, a therapist from the United Kingdom. The medical side of the programme is supported by staff from RAK Hospital.
