= Sah, Yemen =

Coordinates: 15°35′N 48°51′E

- Interactive map of Sah, Yemen
- Country: Yemen
- Governorate: Hadhramaut
- Time zone: UTC+3 (Yemen Standard Time)

Sah is a village in eastern Yemen. It is located in the Hadhramaut Governorate.
