= Shaa Wasmund =

Shaa Lysa Wasmund MBE is a British businesswoman.

== Early life ==
Wasmund was educated at City of London School for Girls and at the London School of Economics, during which period she won a competition with Cosmopolitan magazine to interview the boxer Chris Eubank. During the interview Eubank invited Wasmund to become his assistant and manage his PR. While still at university, she promoted Eubank in the 1990 Nigel Benn vs. Chris Eubank match.

== Career ==
In 1994, Wasmund started several project, including her own PR firm which managed the launch of Dyson vacuum cleaners. In the same year, she launched a yet-unnamed sports PR company which signed Du'aine Ladejo, and formed a seminar series under the name Women's Independent Network(WIN) with guests Marcelle D'Argy Smith and Dianne Abbott MP, among others.

Later, she became a founding director of the travel website Deckchair. She then went on to launch lifestyle website "My kinda place" in 2000. Seven years later, the site was sold to BSkyB. In 2007, Wasmund established Bright Station Ventures, an investment vehicle with $100 million of capital. In January 2009, Wasmund launched Smarta, a site providing information for entrepreneurs and small business owners.

Wasmund was appointed Member of the Order of the British Empire (MBE) in the 2015 New Year Honours for services to business and entrepreneurship.

== Author ==
Wasmund has published multiple books including How to Fix Your Shit: A Straightforward Guide to A Better Life, Do Less > Get More - How to Work Smart and Live Life Your Way and Stop Talking, Start Doing - A Kick in the pants in six parts.
