= Sun Chu =

Chinese general (1890–1962)

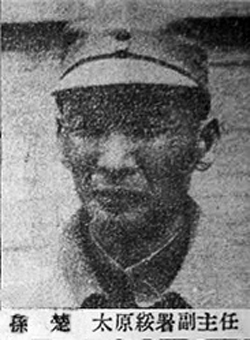
Sun Chu

Sun Chu (traditional Chinese: 孫楚; simplified Chinese: 孙楚; pinyin: Sūn Chǔ; Wade–Giles: Sun Ch'u; 28 November 1890 – 28 January 1962) was a Kuomintang officer from Shanxi. He served in the warlord Yan Xishan's provincial army. He achieved a very high rank in Yan's army, eventually commanding Yan's entire military police force, but owed his high position more to his loyalty and trustworthiness than to any particular military ability. Sun Chu was captured alive when the capital of Shanxi, Taiyuan, eventually fell to Communist forces in 1949. He was later released in 1961. On 28 January 1962, Sun Chu died of illness in Taiyuan.
