= Guangling County =

Guangling County 广灵县 Kwangling
- County
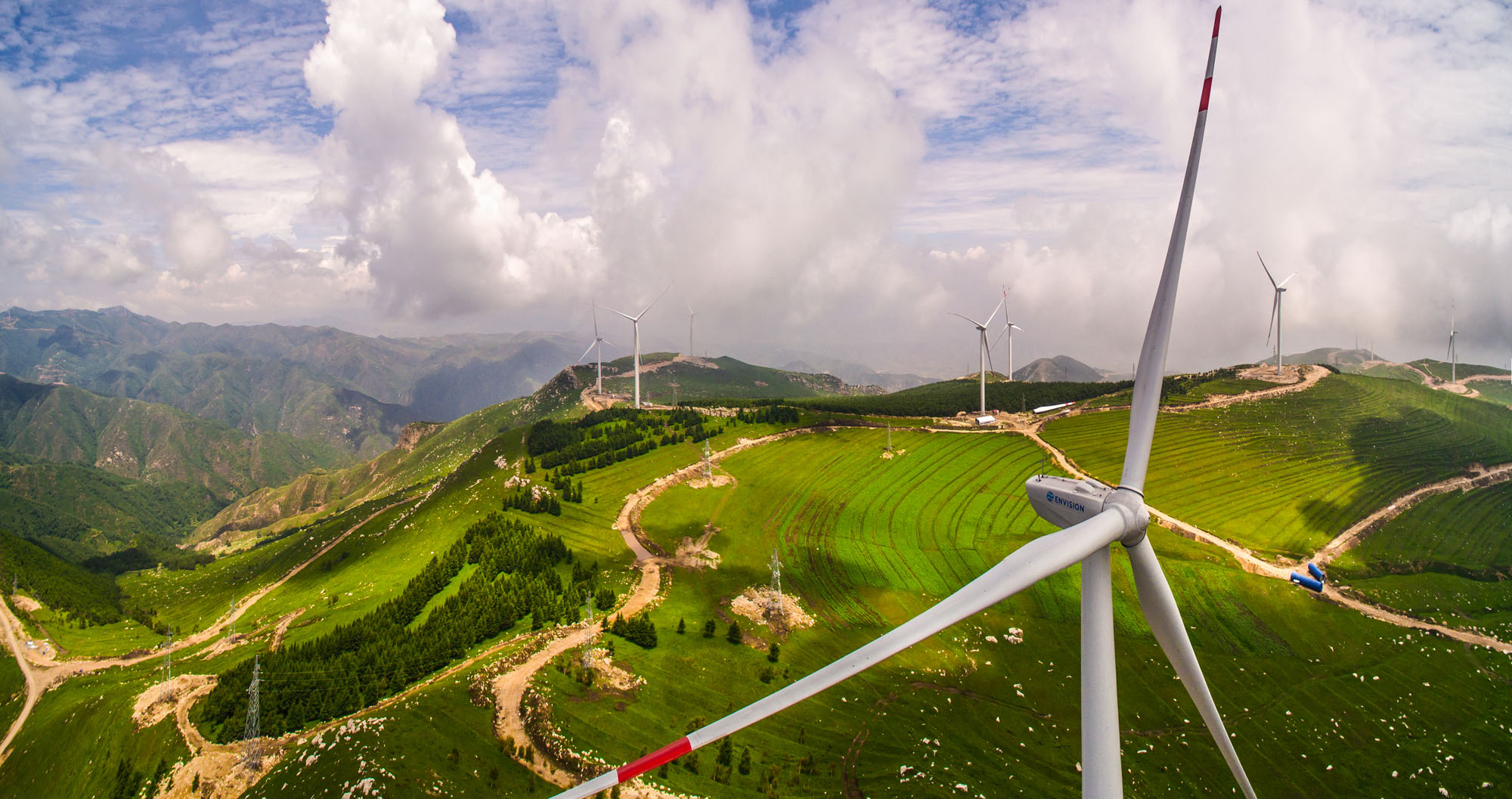

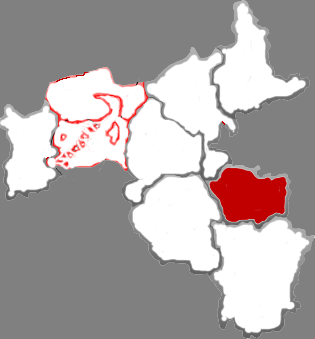
- Guangling in Datong

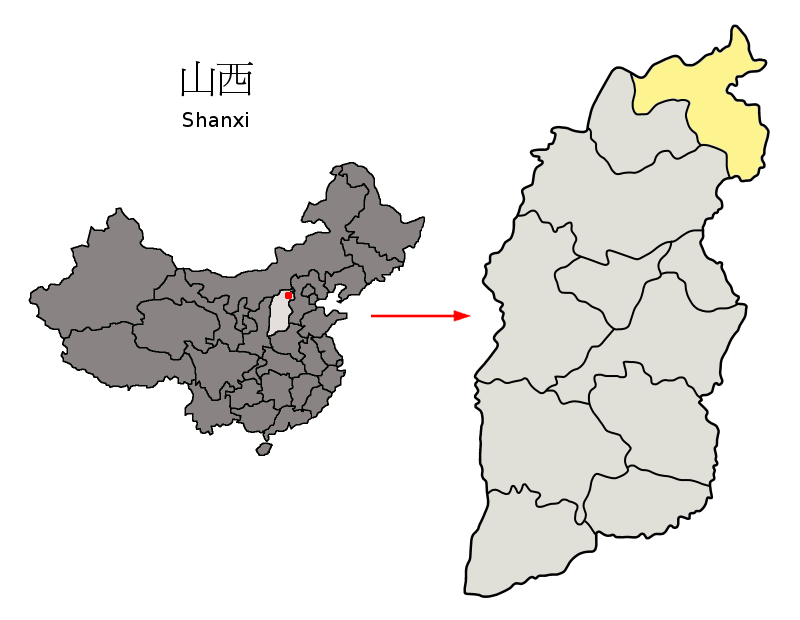
- Datong in Shanxi
- Coordinates: 39°45′37″N 114°16′58″E
- Country: People's Republic of China
- Province: Shanxi
- Prefecture-level city: Datong

Area
  - Total: 1,283 km^{2} (495 sq mi)

Population (2005)
  - Total: 183,284
  - Density: 142.9/km^{2} (370.0/sq mi)
- Time zone: UTC+8 (China Standard)
- Postal code: 037500
- Website: www.sx-guangling.gov.cn

Guangling County (simplified Chinese: 广灵县; traditional Chinese: 廣靈縣; pinyin: Guǎnglíng Xiàn) is in the northeast of Shanxi province, China. It is under the administration of Datong city. Guangling is a basin surrounded by Taihang Mountains. The temperature ranges from −34.0 to 38.2 °C (−29 to 101 °F), with an annual mean of 7.0 °C (44.6 °F). Guangling has nine township level divisions. Tourist attractions include: Temple of Water God (水神堂), Temple of Holy Spring (圣泉寺) and Zhao Great Wall (赵长城). Local products include: papercut, millet, sunflower seeds and dry Tofu.

In 2001, the county was divided into two towns and seven townships.

== Climate ==
Climate data for Guangling, elevation 978 m (3,209 ft), (1991–2020 normals, extremes 1981–2010)
Month	Jan	Feb	Mar	Apr	May	Jun	Jul	Aug	Sep	Oct	Nov	Dec	Year
Record high °C (°F)	9.3 (48.7)	20.0 (68.0)	26.8 (80.2)	36.1 (97.0)	36.7 (98.1)	37.4 (99.3)	37.5 (99.5)	34.3 (93.7)	34.5 (94.1)	28.8 (83.8)	24.0 (75.2)	15.3 (59.5)	37.5 (99.5)
Mean daily maximum °C (°F)	−2.5 (27.5)	2.8 (37.0)	9.8 (49.6)	17.8 (64.0)	23.9 (75.0)	27.5 (81.5)	28.3 (82.9)	26.8 (80.2)	22.6 (72.7)	16.0 (60.8)	6.9 (44.4)	−0.7 (30.7)	14.9 (58.9)
Daily mean °C (°F)	−11.2 (11.8)	−6.0 (21.2)	1.9 (35.4)	10.1 (50.2)	16.8 (62.2)	20.8 (69.4)	22.3 (72.1)	20.4 (68.7)	15.1 (59.2)	8.0 (46.4)	−1.0 (30.2)	−8.5 (16.7)	7.4 (45.3)
Mean daily minimum °C (°F)	−18.0 (−0.4)	−13.4 (7.9)	−5.7 (21.7)	2.0 (35.6)	8.8 (47.8)	13.6 (56.5)	16.4 (61.5)	14.5 (58.1)	8.3 (46.9)	1.0 (33.8)	−7.4 (18.7)	−14.8 (5.4)	0.4 (32.8)
Record low °C (°F)	−34.9 (−30.8)	−28.2 (−18.8)	−29.9 (−21.8)	−14.5 (5.9)	−5.4 (22.3)	3.5 (38.3)	7.7 (45.9)	4.6 (40.3)	−2.8 (27.0)	−10.7 (12.7)	−26.7 (−16.1)	−31.2 (−24.2)	−34.9 (−30.8)
Average precipitation mm (inches)	1.3 (0.05)	2.5 (0.10)	5.1 (0.20)	17.5 (0.69)	34.8 (1.37)	54.5 (2.15)	100.6 (3.96)	76.1 (3.00)	55.8 (2.20)	21.3 (0.84)	6.5 (0.26)	1.2 (0.05)	377.2 (14.87)
Average precipitation days (≥ 0.1 mm)	1.6	2.1	3.0	4.6	7.1	11.0	13.1	11.5	9.2	5.8	2.6	1.3	72.9
Average snowy days	3.0	3.8	3.4	1.6	0.1	0	0	0	0	0.6	3.5	3.3	19.3
Average relative humidity (%)	54	46	41	41	43	56	70	73	68	59	57	54	55
Mean monthly sunshine hours	201.5	202.8	243.9	255.2	279.8	249.8	246.4	242.0	221.6	225.9	199.8	195.6	2,764.3
Percentage possible sunshine	67	66	65	64	63	56	55	58	60	66	67	68	63
Source: China Meteorological Administration
