= Actions in Inner Mongolia (1933–1936) =

Military operations in China by Japan

Inner Mongolian campaign (1933–1936)
- Part of the Second Sino-Japanese War and the interwar period
| Date | April 1933 – December 1936 |
| Location | Chahar and Suiyuan provinces in Inner Mongolia region, Republic of China |
| Result | 1933 Japanese victory 1936 Chinese victory |

Belligerents
| Empire of Japan: Manchukuo; Chinese collaborators; Mongol Military Government (1936) | (Taiwan) Republic of China |

Commanders and leaders
| (Manchukuo) Liu Guitang (1933); Demchugdongrub (1936); Wang Ying (1936) | (Taiwan) Feng Yuxiang (1933) (Taiwan) Fang Zhenwu (1933) (Taiwan) Shang Zhen (1933) (Taiwan) Liu Guitang (1933) (Taiwan) Fu Zuoyi (1936) |

Units involved
| Japanese and collaborator armies: (Empire of Japan) Kwantung Army; 4th Cavalry Brigade; Military advisers; Manchukuo Imperial Army; Detachment of the Taoliao Army; Cui Xingwu Detachment; Liu Guitang Detachment; Collaborationist Chinese Army; Grand Han Righteous Army; Inner Mongolian Army; Prince De Wang's bodyguards; Li Shouxin Detachment; Pao Yueh-ching Detachment | Chinese army and guerrilla units: (Taiwan) National Revolutionary Army; Chahar People's Anti-Japanese Army; 1st Route Army; 2nd Route Army; 3rd Route Army; Cavalry Army; Reserve Army; Northeastern Loyal and Brave Army; Rehe Anti-Japanese Militia; Chahar Self-Defense Army |

Strength
| 1933; 2,000 Japanese and 6,000 collaborators 1936; 10,000 Inner Mongolians; 6,000 Chinese collaborators 30 Japanese advisers | 1933: ~100,000 troops 1936: ~45,000 |

Casualties and losses
| ? | ? |

The Inner Mongolian campaign in the period from 1933 to 1936 were part of the ongoing invasion of northern China by the Empire of Japan prior to the official start of hostilities in the Second Sino-Japanese War. In 1931, the invasion of Manchuria secured the creation of the puppet state of Manchukuo and in 1933, Operation Nekka detached the province of Jehol/Rehe from the Republic of China. Blocked from further advance south by the Tanggu Truce, the Imperial Japanese Army turned its attention west, towards the Inner Mongolian provinces of Chahar and Suiyuan, with the goal of establishing a northern China buffer state. In order to avoid overt violation of the Truce, the Japanese government used proxy armies in these campaigns while Chinese resistance was at first only provided by Anti-Japanese resistance movement forces in Chahar. The former included in the Inner Mongolian Army, the Manchukuo Imperial Army, and the Grand Han Righteous Army. Chinese government forces were overtly hostile to the anti-Japanese resistance and resisted Japanese aggression only in Suiyuan in 1936.

== Background ==
In February 1933, following the successful Japanese invasion of Rehe, the Kwantung Army left a small Japanese detachment and the much larger Manchukuo Imperial Army to watch the eastern Rehe border, while the balance of the Japanese forces moved south to engage the Chinese on the Great Wall. In April 1933, collaborationist General Liu Guitang, under Japanese orders, crossed into southeastern Chahar province in the Dolonor region, as a diversionary feint to draw off Chinese reinforcements to the Great Wall. Finding little resistance, Liu then led his 3,000 troops further east toward Changpei. Although reported at the time as a Japanese operation, Liu's further advance may have been carried out without Japan's explicit approval.

The Kuomintang military committee in Peking appointed General Fu Zuoyi as commander of Chinese 7th Army Group, and tasked him with providing Rehe border security. At the end of April, when the advancing Japanese forces approached Miyun, He Yingqin anxiously redeployed Fu Zuoyi's troops to strengthen the Peking's defenses eastwards to Changping leaving the defense of the Chahar border empty. The Japanese and Manchukuo armies seized the opportunity on May 11, and quickly following up on Liu Guitang's advance, seized the Dolonnur region, and subsequently took Guyuan, just prior to the signing of the Tanggu Truce of May 31, 1933.

== The Chahar People's Anti-Japanese Army ==
The terms of the Tanggu Truce enraged public opinion, particularly in urban China. Groups of Chinese patriots opposed to Chiang Kai-shek's policies, both within the Kuomintang and the Chinese Communist Party, as well as overseas Chinese cooperated in organizing and supporting an irregular force, or Anti-Japanese Allied Army to resist further Japanese encroachment.

General Feng Yuxiang and his former subordinate Ji Hongchang, were able to recruit many units of former Guominjun soldiers. Fang Zhenwu raised volunteers from the rest of China. Added to this were the local militias driven out of Rehe by the Japanese and Manchurian Anti-Japanese guerrilla forces under Feng Zhanhai, the local Chahar militia, and a Mongol army under Demchugdongrub. Even the Japanese collaborator Liu Guitang switched sides, joining the Anti-Japanese Allied Army as did the Suiyuan bandit leader Wang Ying.

After a meeting of the various commanding officers, on May 26, 1933, the Chahar People's Anti-Japanese Army was formally proclaimed with General Feng Yuxiang was made commander-in-chief, Fang Zhenwu became vice-commander-in-chief and Ji Hongchang the front-line commander. The army was estimated in strength to be between 60,000 and 120,000 men by various sources, with the figure of 100,000 men claimed by Feng Yuxiang. Despite its numbers, most of the volunteers in the army lacked guns or other modern weapons.

Order of Battle Anti-Japanese Allied Army Campaign of 1933

=== Campaign of the Anti-Japanese Allied Army ===
By the time the Anti-Japanese Allied Army had been established, the Kwantung Army strengthened its defenses at Dolonnur. The city was garrisoned by over 2,000 men of the Japanese 4th Cavalry Brigade and an artillery unit. Outside the city, the Japanese erected 32 blockhouses connected with trenches, a wire communications network, and multiple lines of obstacles. These outer defenses were guarded by Manchukuo troops under the command of Li Shouxin. To the south the Japanese 8th Regiment was stationed in Fengning, for mutual support with the forces in Dolonnur.

The Anti-Japanese Allied Army found its situation worsening day-by-day. On June 1, Japanese airplanes bombed Dushikou, on June 4, Baochang fell to the Japanese, as did Kangbao on June 5. On June 21, Feng Yuxiang ordered the Anti-Japanese Allied Army to launch a counteroffensive in three columns to regain the lost territory. On the June 22 its vanguard approached Kangbao, and after several hours of fighting, the Manchukuo force under General Cui Xingwu fled, allowing the Chinese forces to re-occupy the town.

In late June, a force under Ji Hongchang pushed northeast against Dolonnur with two corps. The Northern corps recaptured Baochang from the now-demoralized Manchukuo force under Cui Xingwu. The Southern corps under Fang Zhenwu advanced on Guyuan, held by the collaborationist General Liu Guitang. Liu was persuaded to change sides, and surrendered Guyuan and other places on the Bashang Plateau without battle.

On July 8, before dawn, Ji Hongchang began an assault on Dolonnur, capturing the two outer defense lines outside the city before being driven back with heavy casualties. Later some of Ji's soldiers were sent in disguise into the city as covert operatives to gather intelligence for a second attack. This second attack re-captured Dolonnur on July 12, effectively driving the Japanese-Manchukuo armies out of Chahar province. In late July, Feng Yuxiang and Ji Hongchang established the "Committee For Recovering the Four Provinces of the Northeast" at Kalgan, directly challenging threatening Japan's hold on the recently established puppet state of Manchukuo.

=== The end of the Anti-Japanese Allied Army ===
Chiang Kai-shek believed that communists dominated the Anti-Japanese Allied Army, and felt that it was a threat to his authority. When the Anti-Japanese Allied Army was proclaimed, the Kuomintang military committee in Peking issued an order to cut off passenger train service to Kalgan. Later they sent an armored train close to Kalgan, and directed Yan Xishan to station troops on the Shanxi border with Chahar, including the 42nd Division under Feng Qinzai, Chinese 35th Army under Fu Zuoyi and Chinese 3rd Army under Pang Bingxun. In July the Chinese 17th Army under Xu Tingyao and 87th Division under Wang Jingjiu relieved the forces of Sun Dianying and took control of the Peiking - Suiyuan rail line, preventing outside supply and reinforcement to the Anti-Japanese Allied Army.

Chiang Kai-shek also used the Anti-Japanese Armies internal disunity against it, sending spies in to gather intelligence, create rumors, sow dissension, and buy or win over some of the leaders. Generals Gang Bao, Feng Zhanhai, Li Zhongyi, Tan Zixin eventually defected to Chiang. Deng Wen was assassinated.

Japan seized the opportunity provided by this disunity to invade Chahar again in August. On August 8, the Japanese bombed Guyuan and again attacked Guyuan and Dolonnur. Ji Hongchang temporarily stopped the Japanese forces, but the effects of Chiang's blockade meant that food, clothing, ammunition and money were all in short supply. Feng Yuxiang was not able to bring these in from outside Chahar, and the province itself lacked the resources to support the army.

Feng Yuxiang sent a telegram on August 5, announcing that he was going to officially disband the Anti-Japanese Allied Army and asked the national government to let Song Zheyuan return to oversee the process. Many officers and men in the Anti-Japanese Allied Army, now unpaid, suffering starvation, disease and lacking the means to fight were now easily persuaded to join the Chinese Army or submit to being disbanded. Feng Yuxiang resigned his post on August 18, and left Chahar; Dolonnur was re-captured by the Japanese immediately afterwards.

Song Zheyuan made Ruan Xuanwu (former commander of 5th Corps) Shandu garrison commander, overseeing two regiments and Fu Chun (former commander of 24th Division) commander of another regiment under Ruan's command. Zhang Lingyun (former commander of 6th Corps) became Baochang garrison commander; Mie Yuling (former commander of Guerrilla Division) was his deputy, commanding two regiments. Huang Shouzhong (former commander of 18th Corps) oversaw the two battalions of the provincial guerrilla detachment. Sun Liangcheng (former commander of Herald Corps), Liu Zhendong and guerilla leader Tang Juwu were each given command of regiments. Zhang Lisheng accepted the post of provincial government consultant in return for disbanding the Chahar Self-Defense Army. Tan Zixin, Zhang Renjie, Li Zhongyi were put under the command of the Peiking Branch Military Committee. The units of Yao Jingchuan, Song Kebin, and others were reduced and reorganized.

With the Anti-Japanese Allied Army under Fang Zhenwu and Ji Hongchang considerably reduced by Song's activities, Fang Zhenwu as the new commander-in-chief ordered the army east to Dushikou. Some of the subordinates of Ji Hongchang attempted to move west to Ningxia via Suiyuan. However, Fu Zuoyi and Zhang Lingyun pursued and blocked them east of Ertaizi, forcing them east to join Fang Zhenwu at Dushikou.

On September 10, Ji Hongchang went to Yunzhou (north of Chicheng) to meet with Fang Zhenwu, Tang Yulin, and Liu Guitang in a military conference, together they decided to reorganize their troops and changed their name to the 抗日讨贼军 "Resist Japan Thief Punitive Expeditionary Army", Fang Zhenwu was to be commander-in-chief, Tang Yulin deputy commander-in-chief, Liu Guitang Right Route commander, Ji Hongchang Left Route commander. Surrounded by Nationalist forces to the south and Japanese to the north the decision was taken to leave from Dushikou and advance southward toward Peiking.

After the meeting, Ji's Left Route troops pushed southward via the Hei River toward Huairou east of the Great Wall and the Right Route troops under Fang Zhenwu moved west of the Great Wall along the Bai River to the southeast. Both forces crossed the Great Wall on September 20 and on September 21, Ji attacked Huairou and Fang Zhenwu attacked and occupied Miyun on the same day.

Meanwhile, Liu Guitang, after talks with Sung Che-yuan, defected back to the Japanese side again. Liu was given the title of "Bandit Suppression Commander of Eastern Chahar", commanding three regiments stationed at Chicheng, Dushikou and Yunzhou. Liu's force blocked Tang's troops from following the rest of the Anti-Japanese Allied Army south, leaving Fang Zhenwu and Ji Hongchang to continue alone.

On September 25, Fang Zhenwu attacked and occupied Gaoliying. A Japanese reconnaissance aircraft dropped a warning to withdraw from the Tanggu Treaty demilitarized zone the following day, and when he failed to do so on September 27, Japanese aircraft bombed his position. Feng and Ji decided to continue the advance with their remaining 6,000 men, (approximately half unarmed), divided in three groups. At the beginning of October, Ji's forces encountered the forces of Shang Zhen, Guan Linzheng and Pang Bingxun at Changping, blocking their further advance. In a few days they had surrounded the Anti-Japanese Allied Army. Although short of food and ammunition, after several days of heavy fighting Fang and Ji's forces were able to break out to the east at Xiaotangshan but with heavy losses and were again trapped. The remaining 4,500 men were forced to capitulate. Ji was able to slip away during the confusion, going to Tianjin to continue to carry on his opposition to Japan. Fang Zhenwu was forced into exile in Hong Kong.

== Demchugdongrub and the Inner Mongolian Autonomous Government ==
During September 1933, the Mongolian princes of Chahar and Suiyuan Provinces traveled to Bathahalak, north of Kweihwa and gathered in a council with Prince Demchugdongrub, who for months had been trying to found a Pan-Mongolian Self-rule Movement. In mid October, despite their traditional suspicions of one another the princes agreed to draw up a "Confederation of Inner Mongolian States." They sent word to Nanking that unless Inner Mongolian autonomy was formally acknowledged, assistance would be sought from Japan. In response, Chiang Kai-shek permitted the establishment of the Mongol Local Autonomy Political Affairs Committee, but in its attempts to assert its authority it would engage in two serious clashes with Suiyuan provincial forces over the next year.

General Jirō Minami, commander of the Kwantung Army and Colonel Seishirō Itagaki gave support to the Inner Mongolian Autonomous Government. However, when General Minami sent Major Ryūkichi Tanaka and another officer to interview Prince Demchugdongrub in April 1935, an agreement could not be reached at that time.

In June 1935 the North Chahar Incident and the resulting Chin-Doihara Agreement, substantially affected events. The Agreement forced all units of the Chinese 29th Army to be withdrawn from north of Changpei, which amounted to near total evacuation of Chinese forces from Chahar province. Public order was to be entrusted to a "Peace Preservation Corps", a police organization armed with only light weapons. No Chinese settlers were to be permitted to relocate to northern part of Chahar, and the activities of the Kuomintang were banned, as were all other anti-Japanese institutions. In August 1935, General Minami met with Prince Demchugdongrub where the Prince promised close cooperation with Japan, and Minami promised financial assistance.

On December 24, 1935, General Minami sent two battalions of irregular Manchurian cavalry under Li Shouxin, a squadron of Japanese planes, and a few tanks to assist Prince Demchugdongrub in occupying the northern part of Chahar province. The six xian of northern Chahar, were defended by only a few thousand men of the Peace Preservation Corps. With Li's assistance the Inner Mongolian forces soon overran the area.

== Suiyuan campaign 1936–1937 ==
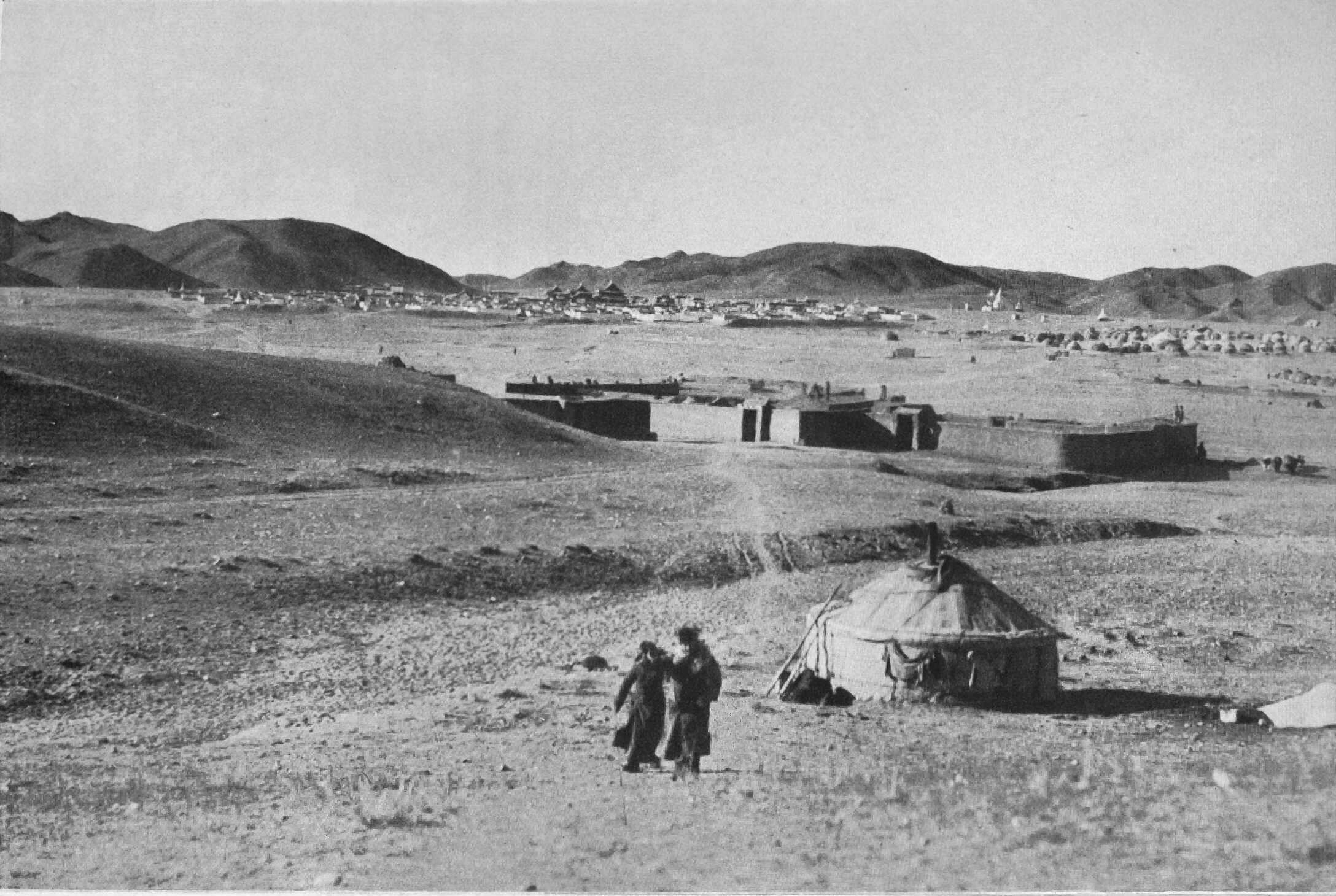
View of the summer camp of the "capital" Bǎilíngmiào (百靈廟, W.-G. Pai-ling-miao, Mongolian Bat Chaalga or Bathahalak) 1934.

=== Japanese preparations ===
For some time before the capture of northern Chahar, Japanese secret agents had been operating in Suiyuan, setting up radio stations with operators disguised as Buddhist priests. Following the promotion of General Seishiro Itagaki to Chief of Staff of the Kwantung Army, plans for the establishment of the invasion of Suiyuan went forward.

In late April 1936, Prince Demchugdongrub and Li Shouxin met with the Japanese Special Service Chief Captain Takayoshi Tanaka, at West Wuchumuhsin. Representatives from Inner Mongolia, Qinghai and Outer Mongolia also attended the meeting, which was called the "State-Founding Conference". A plan was made to create a new Mongolian Empire, which would encompass all of Inner and Outer Mongolia and Qinghai province. As a result of this conference, the Mongol Military Government (蒙古軍政府), was formed on May 12, 1936. A mutual assistance agreement with Manchukuo was concluded in July 1936, and Japan agreed to provide both military and economic aid.

Prince Demchugdongrub set out to enlarge and equip his army, increasing from three cavalry divisions to nine divisions with the aid of his Japanese advisors. The Japanese provided arms captured from the Northeastern Army but Tanaka ignored the advice of the Mongolian leaders and also recruited poorly armed levies and ex-bandits from various regions. Having no unity, poor training and poorly armed, this irregular force of around 10,000 men had poor morale and cohesion and proved to be a liability rather than an asset. Additionally, a collaborationist Chinese army of questionable loyalty, the Grand Han Righteous Army under Wang Ying was attached to the new Inner Mongolian Army

The Japanese also created a "Mengjiang Air Force" with 28 combat aircraft, with Japanese air and ground crews based in Changpei, to assist the army in close air support. The Japanese also provided artillery pieces and armoured cars, (and also reportedly up to thirty tanks or tankettes), also crewed by Japanese. The South Manchurian Railway Company sent 150 trucks to form a transportation regiment, and Manchukuo government sent communications equipment.

=== Chinese response ===
General Fu Zuoyi prepared for the expected Japanese-Inner Mongolian assault by seeking reinforcements for his provincial forces from the governor of Shanxi province Yan Xishan, as well as Chiang Kai-shek, who had moved his Central Army forces into Shaanxi province to attack Chinese Red Army units arriving there after the Long March. On August 9, Yan sent the Chinese 19th Army under Wang Jingguo consisting of the 68th Division, 7th and 8th Independent Brigades and four artillery regiments, and on September 18, the Central Army sent one anti-aircraft artillery battalion.

On October 14, Chiang Kai-shek sent a telegram to Yan Xishan, advising that he was sending Tang Enbo and the Chinese 13th Army (with 2 divisions) and Men Bingyue's 7th Cavalry Division to reinforce Suiyuan. On October 30, Yan Xishan and Fu Zuoyi met with Chiang Kai-shek, to assess the military situation and determine troop dispositions. On November 11, Yan Xishan divided his forces into three Route Armies, a Cavalry Army and a Reserve Army, with troop dispositions to be completed as soon as Tang Enbo's forces arrived. However, the Japanese struck first on November 15, 1936.

=== Suiyuan campaign ===
The invasion of Suiyuan began on November 14, 1936, when a coalition of the Inner Mongolian Army's 7th and 8th Cavalry Divisions, Wang Ying's Grand Han Righteous Army, and Mongol mercenaries from Rehe, Chahar and other areas, supported by 30 Japanese advisors, attacked the Chinese garrison at Hongort.

After several days of fighting the attackers failed to capture the town. On November 17 a Chinese counterattack surprised the invaders and led to a disorganized retreat. Taking advantage of the Mongolian disorder General Fu Zuoyi made a flanking movement to the west of the Mongolian headquarters at Bailingmiao and attacked, capturing it and routing the Mongolian forces. Wang and his Grand Han Righteous Army were trucked into a location near Pai-ling-miao and launched a counterattack, which failed dismally on December 19, with most of the attackers either taken prisoner or annihilated.

== Aftermath ==
The defeat of Japan's proxy forces encouraged many Chinese into pushing for a more active resistance against the Japanese. The Xi'an Incident which occurred immediately after the successful outcome of this campaign was possibly triggered by this event.

Small scale combat continued in Suiyuan until the beginning of open hostilities following the Marco Polo Bridge Incident the following year. Following his defeat in Suiyuan, Prince Demchugdongrub was forced to rebuild his army. With Japanese help by the time war broke out in July 1937, his army consisted of 20,000 men in eight cavalry divisions. These forces participated in Operation Chahar and the Battle of Taiyuan during which Japanese regular and allied Inner Mongol forces finally captured eastern Suiyuan province.

== See also ==
- North China Buffer State Strategy
- Second Sino-Japanese War
- Mongolia in World War II
- Soviet invasion of Xinjiang
