= Anti-Japanese Allied Army campaign of 1933 order of battle =

The order of battle Chahar People's Anti-Japanese Allied Army in the Inner Mongolia campaign of 1933.

The Chahar People's Anti-Japanese Army consisted mostly of former Northwestern Army units under Feng Yuxiang, troops from Fang Zhenwu's Resisting Japan and Saving China Army, remnants of the provincial forces from Rehe, anti-Japanese resistance armies and local forces from Chahar and Suiyuan. The strength of the force was approximately 100,000 men.

== Chahar People's Anti-Japanese Army ==
Chahar People's Anti-Japanese Army – Commander-in-Chief Feng Yuxiang

- Fang Zhenwu – director
- Ji Hongchang – frontline commander

Former Northwestern Army: – Ji Hongchang

- 1st Corps – Tong Linge*
  - 1st Division – Peng Zhengguo
  - 2nd Division – Zhi Yinglin
  - Independent Brigade – Liu Keyi
  - 24th Division – Fu Chun *
  - 25th Division – Ma Guanjun
- 2nd Corps – Ji Hongchang
  - 3rd Cavalry Division – Zhou Yixuan
  - 4th Division – Xu Ronghua
  - 5th Division – Xuan Xiafu
  - 6th Division – Li Tingzhen
- 6th Corps – Zhang Lingyun*
  - Guerrilla Division – Mie Yuling*
  - 2nd Cavalry Division – Hu Yunshan
- Herald Corps – Sun Liangcheng*
  - 1st Column – Lei Zhongtian
  - 2nd Column – Gao Shuxun

Resisting-Japan and Saving-China Army: – Fang Zhenwu

- 1st Corps – Zhang Renjie*
  - ? Division – Song Tielin
  - ? Division – Du Guangming
  - ? Division – Song Kebin *
  - ? Brigade – Cui Guoqing
  - Cavalry Brigade – Gu Youqi
- 4th Corps – Mi Wenhe
  - Teaching Division – Wang Zhongfu
- 5th Corps – Ruan Xuanwu*
  - 16th Division – Ji Handong
  - 18th Division – Xu Quanzhong

=== Other allied forces ===
- Northeastern Loyal and Brave Army – Feng Zhanhai*
  - 10th Cavalry Division – Deng Wenze +
  - 11th Cavalry Division – Tan Zixin *
  - 12th Cavalry Division – Wu Songlin
  - 21st Cavalry Brigade – Guo Fenglai
  - 1st Infantry Brigade – Tang Zhongxin
- Jehol Anti Japanese Militia or 18th Corps – Huang Shouzhong *
  - 32nd Division – Huang Shouzhong
  - 33rd Division – Tan Shilin
  - 34th Division – Yan Shangyuan
  - 4th Cavalry Division – Yao Jingchuan *
- Chahar Self-Defense Army – Zhang Lisheng *
  - 1st Division – Zhang Ziguang
  - 2nd Division – Cao Han
  - 3rd Division – Bai Zhenbao
  - 1st Detachment – Wang De Zhong
  - 2nd Detachment – Jiao Pozhai
- 13th Independent Division – Ren Ping Zhi
- Ethnic-Mongol army – Teh Wang
  - 1st Cavalry – Teh Wang
  - 2nd Cavalry – Jodbajab
  - Self-Defense Army – Fu Linga
- Bandits and former puppet troops
  - 1st Route – Wang Ying
  - 6th Route – Liu Guitang

Notes:

- * Given military commands or position to desert the Anti-Japanese Army cause by Song Zheyuan.
- + Assassinated.

== Japanese and Manchurian forces in the Dolonor area ==
Japan

- 4th Cavalry Brigade – Major Gen. Mogi (over 2000 men and artillery)

Manchukuo

- Detachment of the Taoliao Army – Li Shouxin
- Cui Xingwu Detachment – Cui Xingwu
- Liu Guitang Detachment – Liu Guitang

== Chinese Forces sent against the Anti-Japan Allied Army ==
Said to be 16 Divisions, including:

Shanxi Provincial forces closing the Shanxi / Chahar border – Yan Xishan

Suiyuan Provincial forces closing the Suiyuan / Chahar border

- 7th Army Group – Fu Zuoyi
  - 35th Army – Fu Zuoyi (concurrent)

Controlling Peiking – Suiyuan Railway.

- 17th Army – Xu Tingyao
  - 2nd Division – Huang Jie
  - 25th Division – Guan Linzheng
  - 1st Cavalry Brigade – Li Jiading
- 87th Division – Wang Jingjiu

Units in the final battle against the Anti Japanese Army outside Beijing.

- 32nd Army – Shang Zhen
  - 129th Division
  - 130th Division
- 41st Army – Pang Bingxun
- 25th Division – Guan Linzheng

== Sources ==
- 中国抗日战争正面战场作战记 (China's Anti-Japanese War Combat Operations)
  - Guo Rugui, editor-in-chief Huang Yuzhang
  - Jiangsu People's Publishing House
  - Date published : 2005–7–1
  - ISBN 7-214-03034-9
  - Online in Chinese: https://web.archive.org/web/20070928130306/http://www.wehoo.net/book/wlwh/a30012/04574.htm
    - 第二部分：从"九一八"事变到西安事变察哈尔民众抗日同盟军 1
    - Part II : from the "September 18 Incident" to the Xi'an Incident: Anti-Japan military alliance
