= Shi Yousan =

Chinese politician and general (1891–1940)

- 石友三
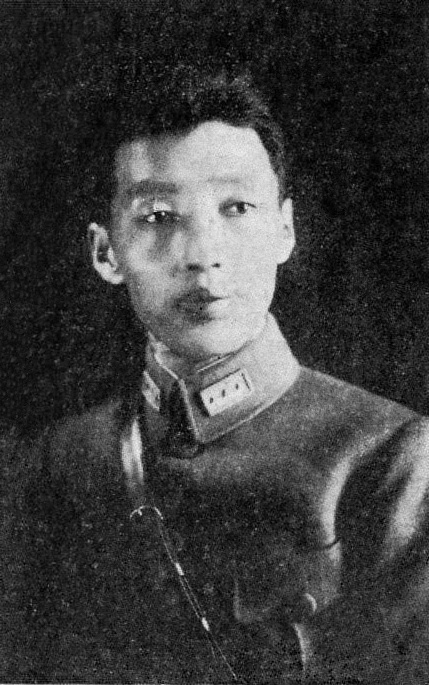
- Shi in NRA uniform, before 1935

3rd Provincial Chairman of Anhui Province
- In office 21 October 1929 – 27 January 1930
- Preceded by: Fang Zhenwu
- Succeeded by: Wang Jinyu

9th Governor of the Chahar Province
- In office 14 January 1939 – July 1939 (Note: Although Shi was officially no longer acting in office due to cooperation with the enemy, the title remained vacant and Shi's term technically only ended with his death. Bi was inaugurated as an interim acting governor on 20 December 1940 and replaced by Feng Qinzai on 26 August 1941.)
- Preceded by: Liu Ruming
- Succeeded by: Bi Zeyu

Personal details
- Born: 1 December 1891 Changchun, Jilin, Qing China
- Died: 1 December 1940 (aged 49) Puyang, Henan, Republic of China
- Party: Kuomintang
- Nicknames: "Defector General"; "Shi who turns three times"; "Slave of Six Surnames"; "Eight inches"

Military service
- Allegiance: Republic of China; Empire of Japan
- Branch/service: New Army (Kuomintang) Guominjun; National Revolutionary Army
- Rank: Lieutenant general

Chinese name
- Chinese: 石友三
Transcriptions
Standard Mandarin
- Hanyu Pinyin: Shí Yǒusān

Courtesy name
- Traditional Chinese: 漢章
- Simplified Chinese: 汉章
Transcriptions
Standard Mandarin
- Hanyu Pinyin: Hànzhāng

Shi Yousan (1 December 1891 – 1 December 1940), courtesy name Hanzhang, was a Chinese general of the National Revolutionary Army (NRA) who served as the 9th Governor of the Chahar and 3rd Governor of Anhui provinces in the Republic of China.

Shi joined, defected from, then subsequently betrayed the forces of Wu Peifu, Feng Yuxiang, Chiang Kai-shek, Wang Jingwei, Zhang Xueliang, and the Chinese Communist Party (CCP). Due to his numerous betrayals and defections, most notably the triple betrayal of Feng Yuxiang in 1926, 1929, and 1930, he is known as the 'Defector General' (倒戈將軍; Dǎogē Jiāngjūn), 'Shi Sanfan' (石三翻; Shí sānfān; 'Shi [who] turns three times'), and the 'Slave of Six Surnames' (六姓家奴; Liù xìng jiānú). (Note: The "surnames" being the prominent people and organisations he pledged himself to, in reference to historical warlord Lü Bu, who is sometimes known as the "Slave of Three Surnames".)

In 1940, while leading the 39th Army Group of the NRA, he planned to defect to the Japanese. Before he could do so, he was kidnapped and buried alive by his sworn brother and subordinate Gao Shuxun, who later gained command of Shi's unit.

== Early life ==
Shi was born on 1 December 1891 in Jiutai, Changchun, Jilin, to an impoverished local family. In his youth, Shi worked as an apprentice at the Bijia Grain Store in Changchun. There, Shi befriended Bi Guangyuan, a member from the wealthy Bi family, which enabled him to attend the government-run Dongguan Elementary. One of his elementary school teachers was a teenaged Shang Zhen. In 1908, he abandoned his studies to join the army, becoming a member of Wu Peifu's forces in the Third Division of the New Army, in the unit under Cao Kun's command, stationed in Changchun and later Langfang in Hebei.

== Warlord Era ==
=== Service under Feng Yuxiang ===
On 29 February 1912, while in Beijing, Shi abandoned Cao's troop when his fellow soldiers started the Renzi mutiny, motivated by unpaid salary and the controversial decision of Yuan Shikai to name Beijing the new capital in place of Nanjing. He answered a recruitment call by Feng Yuxiang, who described Shi as "having the head of a deer and the eyes of a rat, and [being] as skinny as firewood".

Feng rejected his request to become a soldier in his army, for which Feng nicknamed him 'eight inches' (地八寸) due to his short stature (160 cm), (Note: Chinese units of measurement were equated to imperial units, due to which chi and cun are translated to feet and inches, despite the former being lengthier. In imperial units, it would equate to 5 ft 3 in.) though he was allowed to join as a stableman. Shi eventually earned Feng's favor for displaying a strategic mindset during tactical meetings with his officers and showing off his hand-to-hand combat abilities he learnt during his three-month stay at a martial arts school (from which he was expelled after attempting to convince another student to take an exam for him). Additionally, despite being a senior secondary dropout, Shi still possessed a significantly higher education than most of Feng's soldiers and officers, and thus gradually rose through his ranks. In combat, Shi also distinguished himself as an effective commander, such as in the battle for Puyang under control of Chen Shufan during the Zhili–Anhui War. After several engagements by the regiments had failed, Shi organized a "death squad" composed of 120 soldiers, personally gave each one three silver dollars and led the charge on the village, resulting in a complete takeover.

During his time in Feng's army, Shi became close to Gao Shuxun, who joined his company in 1916, and would regularly serve directly under Shi for the following decade and became sworn brothers. In 1924, Shi, along with Liu Guitang, led the North China National Protection Army, a largely independent unit known to engage in banditry in the rural area around Beijing. Shi became promoted to the commander of the 6th Division in September 1924.

In October 1924, following Feng's Beijing Coup, the Guominjun was established. Shi became one of the "thirteen guardians/protectors" (十三太保), considered the most important commanders of the Guominjun, and subsequently the commander of the 8th Mixed Brigade of the 1st Army. In 1926, he gained the rank of lieutenant general in the Beiyang Army.

=== First Defections ===
In 1926 during the Anti-Fengtian War, Shi's troops were stationed at Nankou (now Changping, Beijing), under regular threat of the Zhili and Fengtian clique alliance. Yan Xishan attacked the rear of the Guominjun from Shanxi, so Shi, along with Han Fuju's forces, were sent to fight against Yan's army. Due to the inferiority of their strength, Shi and Han brokered a non-aggression pact with Yan through Shi's old mentor Shang Zhen without Feng's knowledge and staged a retreat in August of the same year. The main force of Feng subsequently abandoned their hold in Beijing, with several deserters running into the units of Shi and Han and being absorbed into their forces. Facing defeat, Feng left the country for the Soviet Union, after which, Shi and Han decided to surrender to Yan.

In September, Feng swore allegiance to Chiang Kai-shek and the Kuomintang after the launch of the Northern Expedition in July. Seeing that Feng's military capabilities had been bolstered, Shi returned to Feng's forces, and was appointed as the commander-in-chief of the 5th division of the Guominjun Army in Shaanxi, reportedly after a heartfelt apology during which Shi knelt and cried in front of Feng. As punishment for Shi's desertion, Feng dismissed Shi's chief-of-staff Zhang Longhua and replaced him with his trusted officer Li Bingxuan instead to directly report any of Shi's action to Feng. Not long after, however, Shi had Li abducted and buried alive as a warning to Feng.

In June of the following year, the Guominjun was reorganized into the 2nd Army Group of the National Revolutionary Army, and Shi became the deputy commander-in-chief of the 1st Front Army and the commander of the 5th Army. During the second phase of the Northern Expedition, areas controlled by the National Revolutionary Army in Henan Province was attacked and captured by the forces of Fan Zhongxiu, a former Shaolin Monastery student-turned-soldier. Feng ordered Shi's troops to move south from Shandong to engage in battle with Fan's forces along with the forces of Song Zheyuan.

In April, Shi participated in the Battle of Yutai-Guting against Sun Chuanfang, and was the only NRA general to maintain hold of the territory afterwards. By the end of 1928, the Northern Expedition was declared over. With the demobilization, Shi was assigned to the command the 24th Division of the National Revolutionary Army and was stationed at Nanyang.

In May 1929, when Feng aligned himself with the New Guangxi clique during the Chiang-Gui War, Shi defected to Chiang after being bribed and promised to be named Provincial Chairman of Anhui, publicly denouncing Feng for committing "the ten major crimes". (Note: Referring to the "unwholesome acts" of Kammapatha in Buddhism) Throughout autumn, Shi's new base of operations was moved from initially Xuchang to Bozhou, and finally Dezhou. In December, however, Shi had a falling out with Chiang over the chairman position and Shi's refusal to send troops to fight Li Zongren and Chen Jitang in Guangdong, who were former allies to him, instead allying with Chiang's party rival Tang Shengzhi. The feud culminated in an incident on 2 December at Pukou railway station where Shi reportedly declared "Old Man Chiang is nothing, blast him!" ("老蔣不是個東西，轟他！") and subjected Nanjing to several hours of artillery barrage with a joint force of Tang, Li, and Chen, aiming at Chiang's office in the Presidential Palace. After Tang was purged, Shi reconnected with Yan Xishan and through him got back in touch with Feng Yuxiang, who put him in charge of the 4th Area Corps of the Anti-Chiang Alliance Army and stationed him in Xinxiang.

=== Shaolin Monastery Incident ===
In mid-late March 1928, Shi's troops were tasked by Feng to drive out Fan from Dengfeng County. Fan had set up base in Shaolin Monastery, having been a lay-disciple under former head monk Heng Lin. Earlier, the temple's latest head monk Miao Xing aligned himself with the Northern Warlords to protect local interests and was killed on 6 March 1927 in an engagement against NRA commander Ren Yingqi while commanding the 1st Shaolin Temple Self-Defence Regiment. By the time Shi arrived at the monastery to find Fan, the monks had formed an armed fighting force and refused to let any harm be done to Fan as a former member of the temple. In the ensuing battle, over 200 monks were killed and the Dharma Hall was set on fire. Brigade commander Su Mingqi then ordered for more of the temple to be set alight as punishment for the monks' resistance, and over the course of 40 days, 90 percent of the buildings were destroyed, and many manuscripts of the temple library were incinerated. The monastery later held that the event resulted from Miao Xing violating the Vinaya through his self-defense initiative, and that this negative karma led to his death and the 1928 cataclysm.

== Nanjing Decade ==
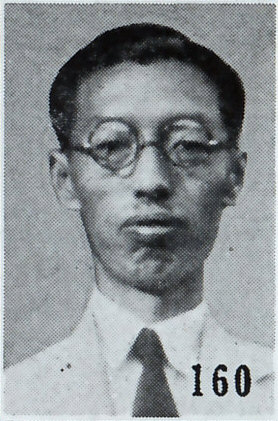
Shi as pictured in The Most Recent Biographies of Chinese Dignitaries

=== Central Plains War ===
During the Central Plains War, Shi continued to serve under Feng. Following a series of defeats in May 1930, including the Battles of Caoxian, Dongming and Xiangcheng, Shi's secretary Liu Yidan arrived in Wuhan bearing a letter for He Yingqin, in which he agreed to side with the KMT government along with Han Fuju and all the soldiers under their command, totalling a third of all of Feng's forces. Shi had been incentivised by He's promise of generous concessions to generals under Feng willing to defect. It was this substantial loss that greatly contributed to Feng announcing his "retirement" and following flight to Taiyuan with Yan Xishan. On 1 June, Shi received a reward of five million yuan and was named commander-in-chief of the 13th Route of the Anti-Rebel Army in an impromptu ceremony in Xuchang through Chiang's emissary Qian Dajun. Despite this, Shi would still covertly assist the remainder of the anti-Chiang forces under Sun Dianying in the Battle of Eastern Henan, capturing Caozhuang Village with plans to kidnap Chiang from his command post at nearby Liuhe station, but the assigned troops failed to complete the 30-mile trek due to rain.

=== Conflict with Zhang Xueliang ===
In early 1931, while in Shenyang, Shi initiated contact with fellow warlord Zhang Xueliang, who had similarly split off from Feng to work with the KMT, and offered to enter an alliance with him, to which Zhang agreed, giving Shi a monthly 600,000 yuan salary, with 200,000 yuan up front as a sign of goodwill. Shi then formed a military force headquartered in Xingtai, composed of tens of thousands of former soldiers under Feng Yuxiang and Yan Xishan and used them to occupy the Pinghan railway, having heard of Zhang's plans to do so. In May 1931, Shi began working with Wang Jingwei, who had also joined forces with Li Rongzen, Chen Jitang and Liu Guitang, promising Shi a position in the anti-Chiang government being established by the Western Hills Group led by Hu Hanmin in Guangzhou, also appointing commander-in-chief of the 5th Army Group and giving him 500,000 yuan. Shi's cooperation with Zhang nevertheless continued until 18 July, when Shi was informed that Zhang had died of illness in Beijing and assuming that Zhang's territories were free for the taking, Shi immediately rallied his troops north to take over. Once in Manchuria on 31 July, Shi's soldiers were intercepted in a pincer movement by the armies of Chiang Kai-shek and the very much alive Zhang Xueliang, leaving only around 4,000 men to return to Dezhou. Zhang would later muse about his involvement with Shi, "A dog will always eat shit, and a wolf will always eat people, it's really hard to change one's nature." ("狗改不了吃屎，狼改不了吃人，真是本性難移啊") For the rest of summer 1931, Shi faced many more losses, including against a joint force of Chen Jicheng and Liu Zhi during the Battle of Baoding on 29 July and a crushing defeat against Han Fuju during the Battle of Dezhou on 8 August, following which Shi "resigned" as a warlord. His military activities ceased for the several months as he reconciled with Han and found refuge from Chiang at his residence in Jinan.

=== Assassination of Zhang Zongchang ===
In September 1932, Shi was suspected of having taken part in the killing of warlord Zhang Zongchang, who had been a personal friend of his, in cooperation with his former allies Feng Yuxiang and Han Fuju, who had by then become military governor of Shandong. The day before Zhang's assassination, on 2 September 1932, Shi hosted a banquet in Han's name for Zhang to discuss a possible military operation to fight the Japanese, who had invaded Manchuria the previous year. Shi expressed great interest in the revolver Zhang carried with him and received the same gun as a present by the end of the festivities. The event was later alleged to have been a ploy intended to get Zhang drunk and disarm him before he left the province to depart for Beijing by ways of Jinan's train station, where Zhang would be shot to death by Zheng Jicheng, the vengeful adoptive son of Zheng Jinsheng, a general under Feng and one of his brothers-in-law, who was killed by Zhang during the Warlord Era.

=== Early Japanese Collaboration ===
In October 1932, Shi left Jinan for the Japanese concession in Tianjin to attend clandestine meetings with Japanese general Kenji Doihara and collaborator Yin Rugeng, who had been providing him with local real estate for his cooperation. He also again associated with Liu Guitang, who was made an officer of the Manchukuo Imperial Army and had begun recruiting former warlords for Japan. Chiang Kai-shek was aware of this betrayal and ordered Beijing station commander Chen Gongshu to arrange Shi's assassination, who in-turn tasked agent Wang Wen with going to Tianjin. Wang bribed Shi's camp assistant Xian Hongxia to have a chef poison a hot pot Shi would eat with his third wife while she was on visit. The plan failed because Shi recognized the chef's anxious demeanour while serving and forced him at gunpoint to confess to the plot. Xian was arrested when she tried to grab Shi's pistol and handed over to Japanese authorities as an "agent of Nanjing", but Shi ultimately never learnt who ordered the attempt on his life. Shi briefly scaled back his dealings with Japan following the assassination of fellow warlord and collaborator Zhang Jingyao on 7 May 1933. That same month, following the Tanggu Truce, Shi was assigned Jibei (Northern Hebei) Security Command of the National Government by the Japanese occupation. Throughout 1934, during the late stages of the Pacification of Manchukuo, he and Liu Guitang acted as agitators for the Japanese concession, conducting bandit operations and organising public unrest against ROC security forces within civilian zones in Yutian, Zunhua, and other areas bordering Tianjin from their headquarters in Qinghe (now a subdistrict of Beijing). This ended on 3 August 1935, when Liu was critically injured in an assassination attempt in Luanzhou and temporarily put out of commission. The perpetrator, Li Zhenhua, claimed to have been acting on behalf of Shi and his inner circle, but Japanese officials heading the investigation instead blamed Tao Shaoming, who briefly held the executive office of supervisor and special delegate to the Manchukuo buffer zone before being ousted after refusing offers to become a collaborator. Tao was remanded into custody for two weeks, but let go after his release was negotiated due lack of evidence.

In December 1935, Shi sought a government job from his old brother-in-arms Song Zheyuan, who was now Governor of Chahar Province. By this point, Song held a great deal of disdain for Shi, knowing full-well of Shi's repeated betrayals, but due to outside pressure from the Japanese, who held control over his governance, Song was convinced to make him the commander of the 181st Division, supposedly composed of former bandits under Feng Shoupeng in Hebei, to stop his persistent requests and keep him away from the Japanese forces he would likely be colluding with otherwise. Eventually, when the battalion was split into three regiments, Shi was reunited with Gao, who gained control of one of the other regiments along with Song. In early July 1936, Shi moved from the Japanese concession to the British concession in Tianjin, following another assassination attempt on Liu Guitang on 20 June.

== Second Sino-Japanese War ==
In the early stages of the Second Sino-Japanese War in July 1937, following the Marco Polo Bridge incident, Shi pledged to aid the KMT in the resistance against the invasion of the Imperial Japanese Armed Forces, but secretly planned to overthrow Chiang from his leadership position, both in collaboration with and separately from several other ex-warlords. Shi's troops were reorganized into the 181st Division and later the 69th Corps.

During the Battle of Taierzhuang, Shi and Gao commanded the 69th Corps and New Eight Army respectively. In the Battle of Wuhan the same year Shi briefly held Jinan with a garrison of 1,000 soldiers.

=== Relations with the Eighth Route Army ===
Starting around 1938, while serving as commander of the Nationalist 69th Corps and conducting guerrilla warfare against the Japanese in Shandong, Shi colluded with the Eighth Route Army of the CCP in Hebei without the knowledge of his superiors, after he gave them vital intel that allowed for the capture of guerrilla leader Qin Qirong, who was a trusted friend to Shi. While working with them, Shi would provide the Eighth Route Army guerillas with the locations of Japanese hideouts to strike, having planned to use the communists as a means to take control of Shandong, but grew disillusioned with this plan after realizing that he would not be getting promoted into higher ranks of leadership or given command over a large enough battalion to establish military governance. For a brief time, Deng Xiaoping and Yang Xiufeng worked in the departments supervised by Shi.

In April 1939, Shi was once again convinced to switch back to the KMT after being promised a leadership position in Northern China by Zang Bofeng. Around the same time, Shi began doing the bidding of his IJAF contacts by sending his soldiers to flush out and eliminate anti-Japanese partisans, for which he was locally reviled as "Shi Yan Wang" ("石阎王"). Shi ended up fully double-crossing the communists by staging a mutiny in July 1939 and fled to Shanxi, subsequently being tracked down by the Eighth Route Army on 30 January 1940. Preparations were made by Nie Rongzhen to attack Shi's location, but before any action could be taken, Shi and his troops fled south with those of Sun Liangcheng.

Throughout February, Shi suffered substantial casualties through Chen Zaidao's 129th Division of the Eighth Route Army in Hebei, Shanxi, before he was able to make it across the Wei River to Henan's Qingfeng County. The Eighth Route Army found Shi on March 4 and attacked his location the same day, consolidating 17 regiments for this purpose, leading heavy losses for Shi, who again managed to escape and head for Shandong, where he was able to make contact with Kuomintang general Ding Shuben in the village of Xiaohanji near Huangjia. Shi did not inform Ding of the Communist forces after him, having made plans to use Ding and the units under his commands as cannon fodder to slow the Eighth Route Army's advance and aid him in his escape. Gao Shuxun, who was serving with Ding at the time and, as a communist sympathiser, had been briefed on the Eighth Route Army's movement through his contacts, ended up informing Ding of the communists' advance, allowing Ding to save himself and some of his troops, before the majority was almost completely annihilated by attacks by the Eighth Route Army who had caught wind of Shi's planned counter-offensive. Shi went into hiding in Dingtao and avoided being discovered by the Eighth Route Army for two months. He was eventually found out in June and driven out of Shandong, across the Yellow River, by communist forces.

=== Alliance with the Imperial Japanese Army ===
In spring 1940, Shi, who had thus far kept his collaboration with the Imperial Japanese Army largely covert and on a transactional level, agreed with his contact Sasaki in Kaifeng and fellow NRA general-turned collaborator Zhang Lanfeng to use his troops to strike against his fellow Chinese, whether that be KMT or CCP, starting on precisely midnight to 1 January 1941, for which he was to be given the leadership of a puppet regime the Japanese would establish in Southeastern China. In November 1940, Shi married Lin Weijun, his fifth wife/concubine, making Shi the son-in-law of the late author Lin Baishui, coincidentally a victim of Zhang Zongchang. Lin was coerced into marrying Shi by having his subordinates surveil and track her movements until she accepted his proposal.

== Death ==
In late 1940, while leading the 39th Army Group of the National Revolutionary Army, Shi once more served with Gao Shuxun. While in Liulin in Dongming County, Shandong, Gao incidentally read a telegram in Shi's quarters that revealed his defection to the Japanese and confronted Shi with this. Shi let Gao in on his plans to switch sides and tried to convince him to join him in doing so. Gao was disgusted by the offer and declined, saying "I'd rather be a hungry ghost than a traitor!" ("寧做亡命鬼，決不當賣國賊!") In response, Shi attempted to absorb several of the troops under Gao's command into his own; despite having different ranks, both controlled equal numbers of soldiers, who refused to subject the regiment size to change.

Although Gao first kept quiet about Shi's betrayal, Gao began to suspect that a Japanese ambush on a railway near the KMT headquarters in Dingtao that resulted in 2,000 casualties in the summer was made possible by Shi's collaboration with the enemy, and believed it had been a precision hit in an attempt to kill him for having ruined his plans with Ding Shuben a few weeks earlier. Gao reported Shi and received orders from Wei Lihuang representing Chiang Kai-shek to have Shi executed for treason. Shi was kept under close watch for a few days until the evening of 1 December, when Gao had his troops storm a meeting he had staged between him, Shi, and Sun Liangcheng in Sun's camp in Liuxia, Puyang County. After four of Gao's men pinned Shi to the ground and disarmed his two bodyguards, Gao, in response to Shi's visible bewilderment, reportedly told him, "If it is not me who kills you, it will be the Heavens who kills you. If it is not the Heavens who kills you, it will be the Earth who kills you. If it is not the Earth who kills you, it will be Chiang who kills you! What goes around comes around, and crimes have just punishments!", ("不是我殺是天殺，不是天殺是地殺，不是地殺是蔣殺，一報還一報，罪有應得!") (Note: The exact wording varies, with some reports claiming and documentaries depicting that it was said before Shi was kicked into his open grave by Gao. Sometimes the utterance is continued with the possibly dramatized extension: "你助紂為虐，出賣我中華民族，活埋了多少好人，今天讓你也嘗嘗活埋的滋味吧！" ("You have reaped the vengeance for your crimes. You have helped the tyrant to commit atrocities, betrayed the Chinese nation, and buried so many good people alive. Today, I will let you also have a taste of what it feels like to be buried alive!")) he revealed that he had informed his superiors and that the execution was an order from Chiang Kai-shek.

=== Arrest and execution ===
Gao's troops took Shi to the bank of the Yellow River just outside of Puyang, had a grave dug for Shi and proceeded to bury him alive. (Note: It was speculated in contemporary news reports that this was done due to Shi's own infamous tactic of burying captives alive by the Yellow River during the Warlord Era. This had earned him various morbidly-themed nicknames, the most often circulated one being "陰間" and similar variations thereof. English-written media often translated it to "Hades", though an alternative and more literal translation would be "Nether Realm" i.e. Hell.) Initially, Shi vehemently protested and scolded Gao for being a disloyal friend, before he began pleading for his life. The burial took 30 minutes and Gao gained command of Shi's unit. Shi's death coincided with his 49th birthday.

== See also ==
- Lü Bu
