= Defense of the Great Wall order of battle =

The following units and commanders fought in the Defense of the Great Wall of the Second Sino-Japanese War. List as of 20 March 1933.

== China ==
Military Committee (Peking branch) - Chairman Chiang Kai-shek, He Yingqin (deputy)

- 1st Group Army - Commander in chief - Yu Xuezhong (defended of Tianjin, Daigu and garrisoned the Tianjin-Pukou Railroad)
  - Chief staff officer Liu Zhonggan
  - 51st Army - Yu Xuezhong
    - 113th Division - Li Zhentang
    - 111th Division - Dong Yingbin
    - 114th Division - Chen Guanqun
    - 118th Division - Du Jiwu
    - 1st Cavalry Division - Zhang Chengde
- 2nd Group Army - Commander in chief Shang Zhen (defended the Luan River and Lengkou Pass)
  - Chief staff officer - Lu Ji
  - 32nd Army - Shang Zhen
    - 139th Division - Huang Guanghua
    - 84th Division - Gao Guizi
    - 141st Division - Gao Hongwen
    - 142nd Division - Li Xingcun
    - 4th Cavalry Division - Guo Xipeng
  - 57th Army - He Zhuguo
    - 115th Division - Yao Dongfan
    - 109th Division - He Zhuguo
    - 120th Division - Chang Jingwu
    - 3rd Cavalry Division - Wang Jifeng
- 3rd Group Army - Commander in chief Song Zheyuan (defended Xifengkou Pass)
  - Vice-commander in chief - Pang Bingxun, Qin Dechun
  - Chief staff officer - Zhang Weifan
  - 29th Army - Song Zheyuan
    - 37th Division - Feng Zhian
    - 38th Division - Zhang Zizhong
    - 2nd Temporary Division - Liu Ruming
  - 40th Army - Pang Bingxun
    - 5th Cavalry Division - Li Fu
    - 115th Brigade - Liu Shirong
    - 116th Brigade - Chen Chunrong
- 4th Group Army - Commander in chief Wan Fulin (assisted the 57th Army with three divisions to defend Lengkou Pass)
  - Chief staff officer - Wang Jingru
  - 53rd Army - Wan Fulin
    - 108th Division - Yang Zhengzhi
    - 10th Division - Shen Ke
    - 106th Division - Shen gram
    - 116th Division - Miao Chengliu
    - 119th Division - Sun Dequan
    - 129th Division - Wang Yongsheng
    - 130th Division - Zhu Hongxun, Yu Zhaolin
    - 2nd Cavalry Division - Huang Xiansheng
- 8th Group Army - Commander in chief Yang Jie (defended Gubeikou pass)
  - 17th Army - Xu Tingyao
    - 2nd Division - Huang Jieyan
    - 25th Division - Guan Linzheng
    - 1st Cavalry Brigade - Li Jiading
  - 67th Army - Wang Yizhe (defended Gubeikou pass)
    - 107th Division - Zhang Zhengfang
    - 110th Division - He Lizhong
    - 112th Division - Zhang Tingshu
    - 117th Division - Weng Zhaoyuan
  - 26th Army - Xiaozhi Chu
    - 44th Division Commander Xiaozhi Chu (concurrently)
    - Preparation Regiment (Turned over to the Peking branch of the Military Committee to direct)
  - 41st Army - Sun Dianying
    - 117th Brigade - Ding Ting
    - 118th Brigade - Liu Yueting
    - Reinforced 1st Brigade - Xing Yuchou
  - 105th Division - Liu Duoquan
  - 6th Cavalry Division - Bai Fengxiang
  - 83rd Division - Liu Kan
- 5th Group Army - Commander in chief Tang Yulin
  - Remnants of this defeated Army from Jehol had retreated into Chahar to the area of Dushikou and Luanping. It operated from Guyuan observing eastern border of Jehol.
- 7th Group Army - Commander in chief Fu Zuoyi (defending eastern sector of the Great Wall line)
  - 59th Army - Fu Zuoyi (concurrently)
  - 61st Army - Li Fuying
  - 1st Cavalry Army - Zhao Chengshou
- Also in Rehe there were Feng Zhanhai’s 63rd Army and other Manchurian Anti-Japanese Righteous and Brave Army units of Li Zhongyi, Deng Wen and others.

Later Reinforcements from Chiang Kai-shek to defend Peiking.

- 87th Division
- 88th Division
- 42nd Division - Feng Qinzai

== Notes ==
- The Chinese forces defending the Great Wall consisted of 8 Army Groups composed of 14 Armies (including 1 Cavalry Army), 36 Divisions (6 were Cavalry Divisions), 19 brigades (8 of cavalry), and 3 artillery brigades. This force amounted to approximately 250,000 men.

== Sources ==
- [1] 中国抗日战争正面战场作战记 (China's Anti-Japanese War Combat Operations)
  - Author : Guo Rugui, editor-in-chief Huang Yuzhang
  - Press : Jiangsu People's Publishing House
  - Date published : 2005-7-1
  - ISBN 7-214-03034-9
  - 第二部分：从“九一八”事变到西安事变滦东战斗 3
- Jehol 1933
- Operation Jehol
- Battles of the Great Wall

== See also ==
- Operation Nekka
- Battle of Rehe
