= Cui Xingwu =

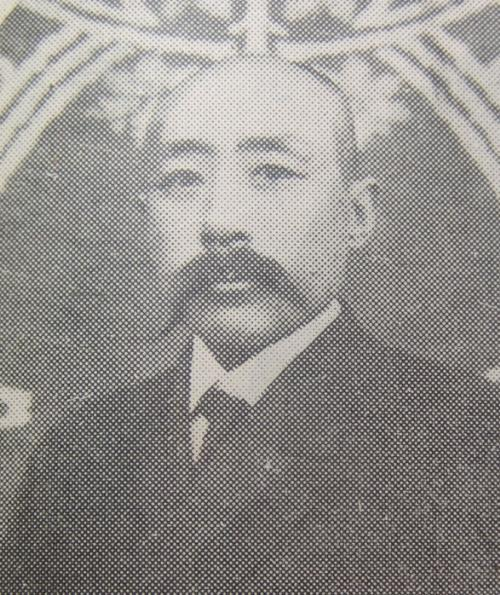
Cui Xingwu

Cui Xingwu (simplified Chinese: 崔兴武; traditional Chinese: 崔興武; pinyin: Cuī Xìngwǔ; 1885–1948) was a Chinese officer in the army defending Rehe in the Second Sino-Japanese War that defected with his brigade to the Japanese and joined the Army of Manchukuo.

Cui Xingwu was an officer in the 55th Army of Rehe province under its governor Tang Yulin. In February 1933 while commanding the 9th Cavalry Brigade at Kailu in the Battle of Rehe, Cui defected to the Japanese invaders with his whole unit. Later in April with puppet forces of Liu Guitang and Li Shouxin and the Japanese 4th Cavalry Brigade Cui moved into eastern Chahar Province. His force captured several cities but was defeated and driven out of Chahar by the Chahar People's Anti-Japanese Army.

== See also ==
- Actions in Inner Mongolia (1933-36)

== Sources ==
- Jowett, Phillip S., Rays of The Rising Sun, Armed Forces of Japan's Asian Allies 1931–45, Volume I: China & Manchuria, 2004. Helion & Co. Ltd., 26 Willow Rd., Solihull, West Midlands, England.
- 中国抗日战争正面战场作战记 (China's Anti-Japanese War Combat Operations)
  - Guo Rugui, editor-in-chief Huang Yuzhang
  - Jiangsu People's Publishing House
  - Date published : 2005–7–1
  - ISBN 7-214-03034-9
  - Online in Chinese: https://web.archive.org/web/20090116005113/http://www.wehoo.net/book/wlwh/a30012/A0170.htm
