= Liu Guitang =

Chinese bandit

Liu Guitang

Liu Guitang (simplified Chinese: 刘桂堂; traditional Chinese: 劉桂堂; pinyin: Liú Guìtáng; Wade–Giles: Liu Kuei-tang; 1892 – 1943) was a Chinese bandit and soldier, involved in the Japanese attempt to control Chahar province in 1933. Noted for switching sides several times and returning to banditry. Later, during the Second Sino-Japanese War, he commanded some Nanjing Government puppet troops.

The former goat-herder Liu Guitang officially became a full-time bandit in 1915 at the age of 23 in the mountains of southern Shandong. He rose to command a large band of bandits, which eventually surrendered themselves to a Chinese army unit that absorbed them into its ranks (a common recruitment practice of the time). Liu and his men were given new arms and equipment and some time later deserted. They were eventually taken back by the army, but deserted once again. Taken back again in 1931, they were sent by Gen. Han Fuju (governor of Shandong) to help garrison northern Shandong. After yet another desertion they were sent by the Young Marshal Zhang Xueliang to garrison Rehe against Japanese and Manchukuoan forces in early 1933. There Gen. Liu and his men finally went over to the Japanese and Liu was made a Manchukuoan commander.

Liu Guitang, now under Japanese orders, was sent to the southeastern part of Chahar province in the Dolonor region with the object of causing trouble for the Chinese there. He then led his estimated 3,000 troops further east to Zhangbei. Reported at the time as a Japanese operation, it may have been done by Liu without Japan's approval.

In late June a force of two corps of the Chahar People's Anti-Japanese Army under Ji Hongchang pushed northeast against Duolun. His southern corps, under Fang Zhenwu, advanced on Guyuan, held by Liu and his puppet army. Fang persuaded Liu to negotiate with him to change sides in return for surrendering Guyuan and other places on the Bashang Plateau. Liu agreed and retained command of his force, now called the 6th Route.

Chiang Kai-shek began to oppose and subvert the Anti-Japanese Army, directing Song Zheyuan to incorporate, disperse or suppress the Anti-Japanese forces still under Fang Zhenwu. The Anti-Japanese Army was considerably reduced by Song's activities. Fang Zhenwu as the new commander-in-chief ordered the army east to Dushikou. On September 10, Liu met with Fang Zhenwu, Tang Yulin and Ji Hongchang at Yunzhou (north of Chicheng). Together they decided to reorganize the Anti-Japanese Army; Fang Zhenwu was to be commander-in-chief, Tang Yulin deputy commander-in-chief, Guitang Right Route commander, Ji Hongchang Left Route commander and the decision was taken to leave from Dushikou and advance south to attack Beijing.

After the meeting in September Liu changed sides. He was given the title of Bandit Suppression Commander of Eastern Chahar and command of three regiments stationed at Chicheng, Dushikou and Yunzhou. Liu's force then blocked Tang's troops from following the rest of the Anti-Japanese Army south, leaving Fang Zhenwu and Ji Hongchang to continue alone; they were defeated outside Beijing in October.

Over the next few months Liu and his men became discontented with their new employment. His forces clashed with the local militia when they tried to collect more taxes than were legally authorized. He tried to get his command posted to a more prosperous location where he would have difficulty getting food for his men. Sung Che-yuan refused his request. Liu and his men revolted on December 25, 1933, and sacked two towns. Under pressure from the forces of Tang Yulin, Liu's men loaded their loot on hundreds of commandeered camels and donkeys and moved south into the newly created demilitarized zone in northern Hebei. He moved back and forth across it to avoid the Japanese and Chinese armies, neither of which would employ him or his men anymore. On January 1, 1934, his force attacked a town within 15 miles of Beijing. Troops of Gen. Han Fuju were sent against him and defeated Liu's force. He evaded capture and reached the Japanese concession in Tianjin. There he was said to have once more offered his services to the Japanese.

It seems he returned to Shandong sometime late in the 1930s, and during the Second Sino-Japanese War commanded a puppet garrison for the defense of Juxian in support of the Japanese attack on Linyi during the Battle of Xuzhou. He managed to become Commander of over 1000 puppet troops for the Nanjing government in Shandong province. It is claimed he was killed in combat with Communist guerrilla troops in November 1943.
