= Tang Yulin =

Chinese general and warlord (1877–1937)

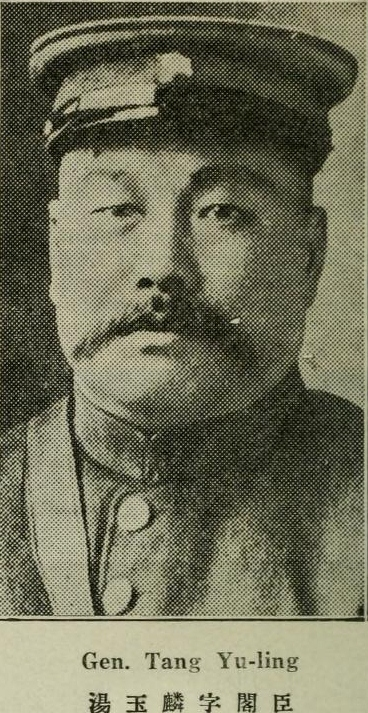
Tang Yulin, c. 1933

Tang Yulin (traditional Chinese: 湯玉麟; simplified Chinese: 汤玉麟; pinyin: Tāng Yùlín; Wade–Giles: T'ang Yü-lin; 1877–1937) was a Chinese general who served in the Northeastern Army. An important member of the Fengtian clique that governed Manchuria during the Warlord Era, he served as warlord of Rehe Province. His military incompetence was a major factor Japan's successful invasion of that province in 1934.

== Biography ==
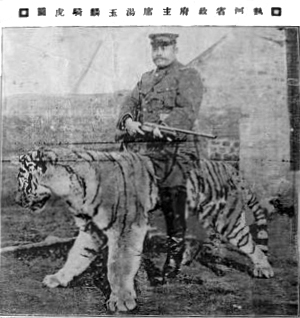
1929 photo titled Rehe Provincial Government Chairman Tang Yulin Riding A Tiger

Tang Yulin was born in 1871 in Chaoyang county, Zhili (today Fuxin, Liaoning). In 1902 he joined the Fengtian First Road Defense Sentry patrol battalion as an officer. In 1912 he was given command of the 27th Regiment, 27th Cavalry Division, and the following year was promoted to command the 52nd Brigade. In 1917 he participated in Zhang Xun's Manchu restoration. After Duan Qirui defeated Zhang he fled to Fuxin to live in seclusion. In 1919 Tang returned to be appointed as Fengtian inspection official for the three Northeastern provinces. In May 1921 he was appointed Fengtian army 11th Brigade Commander. During the Second Zhili–Fengtian War in 1924 he commanded the Fengtian 11th Infantry Division.

In 1926 he was appointed to command Fengtian's 12th Army and given the chairmanship of the government of Rehe, which he was to hold from April 5, 1926, to July 1932. After the Chinese reunification at the end of the Northern Expedition, Tang was confirmed in his control of Rehe by the Kuomintang and made governor and commander of the 36th Division. His many extortions and taxes gave him a great deal of revenue that he used to purchase luxury residences in the Italian concession in Tianjin. He also engaged in the opium trade, having an opium factory at his residence in Chengde, and sold Manchu antiques in the Treaty ports.

In late February 1933 the Japanese attacked Rehe in Operation Nekka. With insufficient troops—and those poorly equipped and led—his defenses soon fell, despite the mountainous terrain and snowstorms hindering the Japanese. Some of his officers went over to the Japanese. With his capital soon to fall, Tang diverted 200 trucks assigned to support his army to transport his wealth to Tianjin. When they were stopped and the cargo seized at the Great Wall, Zhang Xueliang ordered Tang arrested. He fled the province, with a 200-man bodyguard, into Chahar along with remnants of his provincial forces.

On September 10, 1933, Tang met with Fang Zhenwu, Ji Hongchang and Liu Guitang, the remaining leaders of the Chahar People's Anti-Japanese Army at Yunzhou, where it was reorganized. Tang was made its Deputy Commander-in-chief. Liu Guitang was persuaded to switch sides by Song Zheyuan and blocked Tang from marching to join Ji and Fang in their march south on Peking. After the failure of Fang Zhenwu and Ji Hongchang's march on Peking, Tang turned on Liu Guitang and drove him out of Chahar in December 1933.

In May 1934 Tang became a senior adviser to Song Zheyuan in command of the Beijing Government and 29th Army. Six months later he had to resign and retire to his residence in the Italian concession in Tianjin. He died there in May 1937.

== Awards and decorations ==
Order of Rank and Merit
Order of Wen-Hu

== Sources ==
- Fenby, Jonathan, Chiang Kai Shek: China's Generalissimo and the Nation He Lost

Carroll & Graf Publishers, 2004, ISBN 0-7867-1318-6

- 中国抗日战争正面战场作战记 China's Anti-Japanese War Combat Operations
  - Author : Guo Rugui, editor-in-chief Huang Yuzhang
  - Press : Jiangsu People's Publishing House
  - Date published : 2005-7-1
  - ISBN 7214030349
  - Online in Chinese
- Jowett, Phillip (2005). Rays of the Rising Sun: Japan's Asian Allies 1931–1945 Volume 1: China and Manchukuo. Helion and Company Ltd. ISBN 1-874622-21-3.- Book about the Chinese and Mongolians who fought for the Japanese during the Second Sino-Japanese War.
