= Zhang Lingyun =

Zhang Lingyun (traditional Chinese: 張淩雲; simplified Chinese: 张凌云; pinyin: Zhāng Língyún; 1895–1946) or Chang Ling-yun, was a general in the Chinese National Revolutionary Army during the Warlord era and Second Sino-Japanese War.

Zhang Lingyun was a Northwestern Army officer under the warlord Feng Yuxiang. After the Central Plains War, Feng's forces were dispersed. When Feng made a comeback organizing the Chahar People's Anti-Japanese Army in 1933, Zhang, like many other former Northwestern Army soldiers, joined it. He was made the general commanding 6th Corps of the Anti Japanese Army. When the Anti Japanese army was dispersed in August 1933, Song Zheyuan made him Baochang garrison commander in Chahar. In September 1933, he assisted Fu Zuoyi against some of his former comrades, pursuing and blocking them east of Ertaizi, Suiyuan when they attempted to move west to Ningxia via Suiyuan, forcing them east to join Fang Zhenwu at Dushikou.

By the outbreak of war with Japan, Zhang was with the 37th Division and served in the early campaigns of the Second Sino-Japanese War in North China. In August 1937 Zhang had become commander of the 37th Division succeeding Feng Chian. Under his command 37th Division fought in the Beiping–Hankou Railway Operation from August 1937 to Mid August 1937 under 77th Corps of 1st Army Group. His Division was involved in the Tianjin–Pukou Railway Operation for a short time in September and then returned to fighting in the other operation until January 1938. Also he was in the Battle of Northern and Eastern Henan. For some time he was not in command of 37th Division During the Battle of Xuzhou but was back in command for the Battle of Wuhan.

== Sources ==
- Hsu Long-hsuen and Chang Ming-kai, History of The Sino-Japanese War (1937–1945) 2nd Ed., 1971. Translated by Wen Ha-hsiung, Chung Wu Publishing; 33, 140th Lane, Tung-hwa Street, Taipei, Taiwan Republic of China.
- 中国抗日战争正面战场作战记 (China's Anti-Japanese War Combat Operations)
  - Guo Rugui, editor-in-chief Huang Yuzhang
  - Jiangsu People's Publishing House
  - Date published : 2005-7-1
  - ISBN 7-214-03034-9
  - Online in Chinese:
