= Duolun =

Duolun may refer to:

- Duolun County, in Inner Mongolia, China
- Dolon Nor, county seat of Duolun County, Inner Mongolia, China
- Duolun Road, in Shanghai, China
