= Dolon Nor =

Dolon Nor 多伦淖尔镇
- Town
- Location in Inner Mongolia
- Coordinates: 42°12′24″N 116°29′05″E
- Country: China
- Region: Inner Mongolia
- League: Xilin Gol
- County: Duolun County
- Elevation: 1,237 m (4,058 ft)
- Time zone: UTC+8 (China Standard)
- Postal code: 027300
- Area code: 0479

Dolon Nor

Chinese name
- Traditional Chinese: 多倫淖爾 多倫
- Simplified Chinese: 多伦淖尔 多伦
- Literal meaning: Mongolian for "Seven Lakes"
Transcriptions
Standard Mandarin
- Hanyu Pinyin: Duōlúnnào'ěr; Duōlún
- Wade–Giles: To-lun-nao-erh; To-lun

Mongolian name
- Mongolian Cyrillic: Долоон нуур
- Mongolian script: ᠳᠣᠯᠣᠨ ᠨᠤᠤᠷ
Transcriptions
- SASM/GNC: Doloon nuur Doluɣan Naɣur

Former names

Lama-Miao
- Traditional Chinese: 喇嘛廟
- Simplified Chinese: 喇嘛庙
- Literal meaning: Lamasery
Transcriptions
Standard Mandarin
- Hanyu Pinyin: Lǎmamiào
- Wade–Giles: La-ma-miao

Dolon Nor, also known as Dolonnur and previously as To-lun and Lama-Miao, is a town and the county seat of Duolun County, Xilin Gol League in the Inner Mongolia Autonomous region, China. It is of historical importance because the remnants of Shangdu, the summer capital of Kublai Khan and the following Mongol emperors of the Yuan dynasty (13th and 14th century), are located some 28 kilometers (17 miles) northwest of the modern town. Beginning in the 17th century, the Manchu emperors of the Qing dynasty developed the city as a religious center.

View of the city Tolon-Noor, 1851

In the 11th edition of the Encyclopaedia Britannica, the city was described as follows:

The town proper almost exclusively occupied by Chinese, is about a mile in length by half a mile in breadth, has narrow and dirty streets, and contains a population of about 26,000. Unlike the ordinary Chinese town of the same rank, it is not walled. A busy trade is carried on between the Chinese and the Mongolians, who bring in their cattle, sheep, camels, hides and wool to barter for tea, tobacco, cotton and silk. At some distance from the Chinese town lies the Mongolian quarter, with two groups of lama temples and villages occupied by about 2300 priests. Dr Williamson (Journeys in North China, 1870) described the chief temple as a huge oblong building with an interior not unlike a Gothic church. Lamamiao is the seat of a manufactory of bronze idols and other articles of ritual, which find their way to all parts of Mongolia and Tibet. The craftsmen work in their own houses.

Another, longer description of the city is in writings of Évariste Huc (1813–1860), a Frenchman who stayed there in 1845 on his way to Lhasa (which he reached after 18 months of travelling).

In 1933, the town was the object of fighting between the Japanese and their Manchukuoan puppet troops and the Chahar People's Anti-Japanese Army.

== See also ==
- Actions in Inner Mongolia (1933–36)
