= Xu Tingyao =

Chinese general (1892–1974)

General Xu Tingyao
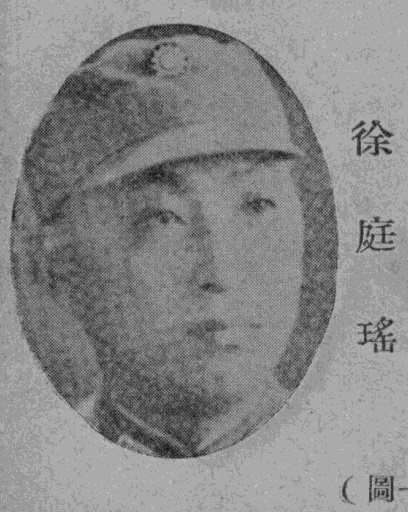
- Born: 9 October 1892; Wuwei, Anhui, Qing China
- Died: 16 December 1974 (aged 82); Taipei, Taiwan
- Military career
- Allegiance: Republic of China
- Branch: (Republic of China (1912–1949)) National Revolutionary Army
- Service years: ?–1952
- Nickname: "Father of the National Army’s Armoured Soldiers"
- Conflicts: Chinese Civil War; Central Plains War; Second Sino-Japanese War; Defense of the Great Wall; Battle of South Guangxi; Battle of Kunlun Pass

Xu Tingyao (traditional Chinese: 徐庭瑤; simplified Chinese: 徐庭瑶; pinyin: Xú Tíngyáo; Wade–Giles: Hsü Ting-yao; 9 October 1892 – 16 December 1974), courtesy name Yuexiang (月祥) was a Republic of China Army general who served during the Second-Sino Japanese War and Chinese Civil War.

== Biography ==
Xu was born in Wuwei, Anhui in 1892. He graduated from the Baoding Military Academy in 1916, and left for Guangzhou to join Sun Yat-sen's faction the following year. He served during the Northern Expedition, and was promoted to lieutenant general in 1928. When the Central Plains War broke out in 1930, Xu was ordered to attack Feng Yuxiang and Tang Shengzhi, who had rebelled against Chiang Kai-shek's government. In 1932, he was ordered to suppress the Chinese Communists in the border area of Henan, Hubei and Anhui. He was promoted to commander of the 17th Army in the same year.

Xu commanded the 17th Army during the Defense of the Great Wall in 1933, taking temporary command of the 8th Army Group when its commander was relieved. In July of the same year his army took control of the Beiping-Suiyuan Railroad, following orders to blockade the Chahar People's Anti-Japanese Army. From 1934 to 1935 he was the head of a Chinese military delegation to Europe and the United States. In October 1935 he took charge of the training schools for China's developing mechanized forces.

During the war with Japan, Xu commanded the 38th Army Group in the Battle of South Guangxi from December 1939 to April 1940. His forces, including the mechanized troops of the 5th Corps and 200th Division defeated the Japanese in the Battle of Kunlun Pass. He later went to Taiwan in 1949 and retired in 1952. He died on 16 December 1974 in Taipei.
