= Yunzhou Township =

Yunzhou Township 云州乡
- Township
- Interactive map of Yunzhou Township
- Coordinates: 41°02′34″N 115°46′16″E
- Country: China
- Province: Hebei
- Prefecture-level city: Zhangjiakou
- County: Chicheng County
- Seat: Yunzhou Village

Area
  - Total: 522.9 km^{2} (201.9 sq mi)
- Elevation: 977 m (3,205 ft)

Population (2002)
  - Total: 18,300
  - Density: 35.0/km^{2} (90.6/sq mi)
- Time zone: UTC+8 (China Standard)

Yunzhou Township (simplified Chinese: 云州乡; traditional Chinese: 雲州鄉; pinyin: Yúnzhōu Xiāng) is a township in northwestern Hebei province, People's Republic of China, on the upper reaches of the Bai River. It is under the administration of Chicheng County, 15 kilometres (9.3 mi) to the south-southeast.

== History ==
In the 4th century CE the area was the centre of Yunzhou Province. When the Republic of China ruled all of China from 1912 to 1936, the area was in the far southeast corner of Chahar Province.

== Geography ==
Neighbouring towns are Dushikou to the north, Chicheng Town (赤城镇) to the south, Zhenningbao Township (镇宁堡乡) and Maying Township (马营乡), and Dongwankou Township (东万口乡) and Longmensuo (龙门所镇) to the east. Within the township, elevations increase from south to north, while the average elevation is 1,200 metres (3,900 ft). Bingshanliang (冰山梁), at 2,229 metres (7,313 ft) is the highest point in the township. Nearby is the Yunzhou Reservoir (云州水库).
