= Feng Qinzai =

Chinese general

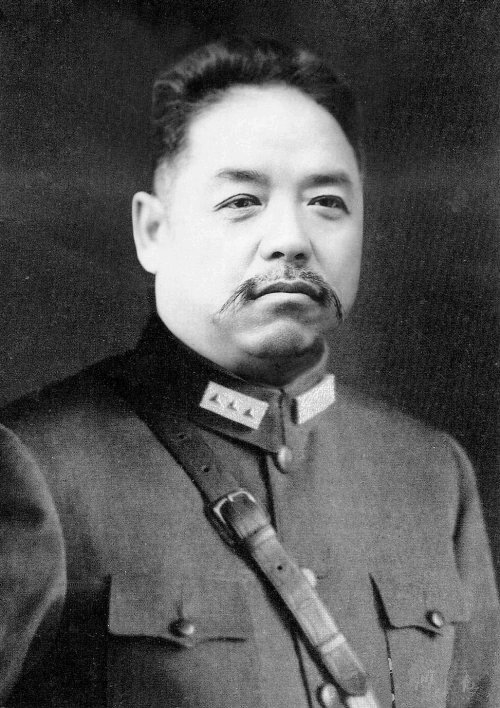
- Born: 1887; China
- Died: 1963 (aged 75–76); Xi'an, People's Republic of China
- Occupation: Army general

Feng Qinzai (simplified Chinese: 冯钦哉; traditional Chinese: 馮欽哉; pinyin: Féng Qīnzāi; also Feng Chin-Tsai; 1887 – 1963) was a Lieutenant-General in the Chinese Army during the Second Sino-Japanese War.

Feng Qinzai commanded the 42nd Division during the Battle of the Great Wall. In 1937, he became commander of the 14th Army, leading it in the Battle of Taiyuan. In 1941, he was made the Deputy Commander in Chief of the Hebei-Chahar War Area, in charge of guerilla forces behind Japanese lines. He held this command until the end of the war. He was also at the same time appointed the Chairman of the Government of Chahar Province, which he held until 1946.
