= Feng Yuxiang =

Chinese warlord (1882–1948)

- 馮玉祥
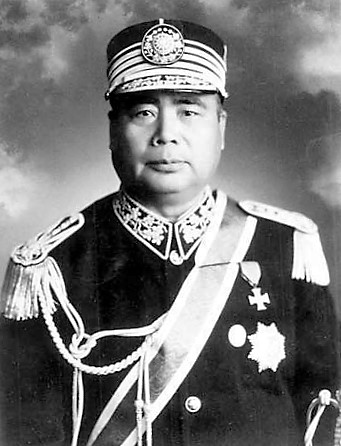
- Feng c. 1936-46

Vice Premier of China
- In office 28 October 1928 – 11 October 1930
- Premier: Tan Yankai; T. V. Soong (acting)
- Preceded by: Position established
- Succeeded by: T. V. Soong

Minister of War
- In office October 1928 – 1929
- Premier: Tan Yankai
- Preceded by: He Fenglin
- Succeeded by: Lu Zhonglin

Personal details
- Born: 6 November 1882 Chaoxian County, Anhui, Qing Empire (now Chaohu, Anhui, China)
- Died: 1 September 1948 (aged 65) Black Sea
- Party: Kuomintang
- Spouses: Liu Dezhen (m. 1905; died 1923) Li Dequan (m. 1924)
- Children: 9, including Feng Hongda
- Awards: Order of Rank and Merit; Order of the Precious Brilliant Golden Grain; Order of Wen-Hu

Military service
- Allegiance: Qing dynasty Republic of China; Empire of China
- Branch/service: Huai Army; Beiyang Army; National Revolutionary Army; Chahar People's Anti-Japanese Army
- Years of service: 1893–1945
- Battles/wars: Xinhai Revolution; Bai Lang Rebellion; Warlord Era; National Protection War; Manchu Restoration; Constitutional Protection Movement; Second Zhili-Fengtian War; Beijing Coup; Anti-Fengtian War; Northern Expedition; Central Plains War; Inner Mongolian campaign

Feng Yuxiang (simplified Chinese: 冯玉祥; traditional Chinese: 馮玉祥; pinyin: Féng Yùxiáng, IPA: [fə́ŋ ỳɕi̯ɑ́ŋ], 6 November 1882 – 1 September 1948), courtesy name Huanzhang (焕章; 煥章), was a Chinese warlord and later general in the National Revolutionary Army. He served as Vice Premier of China from 1928 to 1930.

At the start of the 1911 Revolution, Feng was an officer in the ranks of Yuan Shikai's Beiyang Army. He initially joined forces with the revolutionaries, but came to support Yuan's regime. In 1914, he converted to Christianity, earning him the nickname the "Christian General". He became a warlord in Northwest China, based in Shaanxi, and rose to a high rank within the Zhili clique, a powerful warlord faction. In 1924, during the Second Zhili-Fengtian war, Feng launched the Beijing Coup, which knocked the Zhili out of power, and re-organised his troops as the Guominjun. He brought Sun Yat-sen to Beijing for negotiations on re-unification, but this was not realized.

In 1926, Feng was defeated by the Zhili and Fengtian cliques in the Anti-Fengtian War, and he retreated to the northwest. In 1926, Feng joined the Kuomintang's successful Northern Expedition. He later resisted Chiang's consolidation of power in the Central Plains War and was forced to retire, but in 1933 organized a new army which successfully drove the Japanese Army out of Chahar. In the 1930s, Feng held positions in the Nationalist government, including brief army commands at the start of the Second Sino-Japanese War in 1937. He spent his later years supporting the anti-Chiang Revolutionary Committee of the Chinese Kuomintang before his death in a shipboard fire on the Black Sea in 1948.

== Early life and career ==
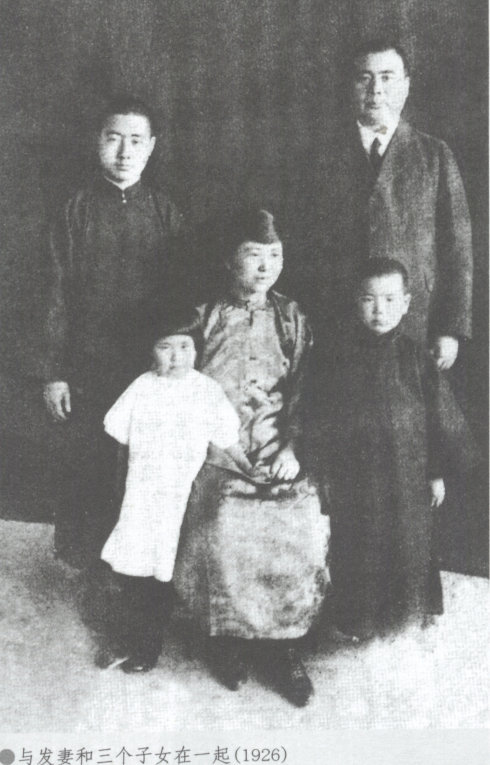
Feng Yuxiang and his family in 1926

Feng was born on 6 November 1882 in Xingjizhen, in Zhili province, now part of Hebei. His father was Feng Yumou, an officer in the Huai Army. Feng spent his youth immersed in military life. He joined the Huai Army when he was 11 as a deputy soldier, the lowest rank in the army, and he received a uniform and food but, unlike regular soldiers, no salary. By the age of 16 he had proved himself and became a regular. Unlike other soldiers who gambled away their pay, Feng saved his salary and used a portion of it to help out other soldiers in need, especially the deputy soldiers, as he had once been, and so he was popular among his comrades-in-arms. Feng was hard-working and motivated, and in 1902 he was reassigned to Yuan Shikai's newly established Beiyang Army.

During the Xinhai Revolution of 1911 Feng joined the Luanzhou Uprising against the Qing Court and supported the revolutionaries in the South. After the uprising was suppressed, he was detained, dismissed from the army and sent back to his home province. In 1936, he initiated the building of a memorial cemetery in Beiping for the uprising's martyrs. In 1914 he regained military rank and spent the next four years defending Yuan's regime. In July 1914, as a brigade commander, he participated in the suppression of the Bai Lang Rebellion in Henan and Shaanxi. During the National Protection War of 1915–16 he was sent to Sichuan to fight the Anti-Yuan National Protection Army, but secretly communicated with revolution leader Cai E. In April 1917 he was stripped of his military rank but still led his old troops in the campaign against Zhang Xun and was restored to his rank. In February 1918 he was ordered to suppress the Constitutional Protection Movement, but proclaimed his support for peace talks in Hubei and was stripped of titles but permitted to stay in command of his forces. The capture of Changde in June earned him back his titles. By August 1921 he was promoted to command a division and was based in Shaanxi.

=== Conversion to Christianity ===
Feng, like many young officers, was involved in revolutionary activity and was nearly executed for treason. He later joined Yuan Shikai's Beiyang Army and with the help and advice of Chinese diplomat Wang Zhengting, converted to Christianity in 1914, being baptized into the Methodist Episcopal Church.

Feng's career as a warlord began soon after the collapse of the Yuan Shikai government in 1916. Feng, however, distinguished himself from other regional militarists by governing his domains with a mixture of paternalistic Christian socialism and military discipline. He forbade prostitution, gambling and the sale of opium and morphia. Unlike most of the warlords who favored elaborate, gaudy uniforms, Feng often liked to dress as a common soldier in order to show his sympathy for his men. From 1919 he was known as the "Christian General".

In 1923 British Protestant Christian missionary Marshall B. Broomhall said of him:

The contrast between Cromwell's Ironsides and Charles's Cavaliers is not more striking than that which exists in China to-day between the godly and well-disciplined troops of General Feng and the normal type of man who in that land goes by the name of soldier ... While it is too much to say that there are no good soldiers in China outside of General Feng's army, it is none the less true that the people generally are as fearful of the presence of troops as of brigand bands.

He was reputed to have liked baptizing his troops with water from a fire hose. However, no such incident is mentioned in Sheriden's detailed biography, or in Broomhall's account. Both Broomhall and Sheriden say that baptism was taken very seriously and that not all of Feng's troops were baptized. Journalist John Gunther, in his 1939 book Inside Asia, specifically denied that such mass baptisms took place.

== Rise ==
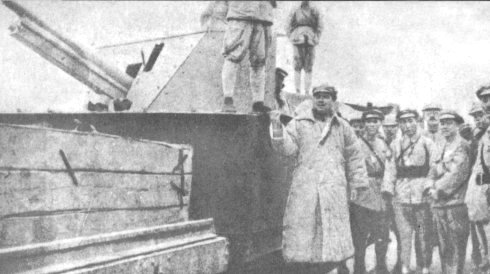
Feng Yuxiang in front of an armored car captured from the Fengtian clique in 1926

In the early 1920s, Feng rose to prominence in the Zhili clique of warlords, named so because their base of power was centred around Zhili Province. By 1922, Feng held the post of Inspector of the Army. The Zhili clique defeated the Fengtian clique, headed by Zhang Zuolin, father of Zhang Xueliang, in the First Zhili–Fengtian War in 1922. It was at this time that Feng also began to move closer to the Soviet Union. Feng was in regular contact with Mikhail Borodin, the chief Comintern agent for China, who for a time regarded Feng as the best hope for Communism in China.

=== Beijing Coup ===
Within the Zhili clique Feng was demoted by Wu Peifu and sent to guard the southern suburbs of Beijing. In 1923 Feng was inspired by Sun Yat-sen and secretly plotted with Hu Jingyi and Sun Yue to overthrow Wu Peifu and Cao Kun, who controlled the Beiyang government. When the Second Zhili–Fengtian War began in 1924, Feng was in charge of defending Rehe against the Fengtian clique. However, he switched sides and seized the capital in the Beijing Coup on 23 October 1924. This turnabout prompted Shandong warlord Zhang Zongchang to join the Fengtian and led to a decisive defeat of the Zhili forces. Hence, Feng's coup brought far-reaching political changes in China. Feng imprisoned Zhili-leader and president Cao Kun, installed the more liberal Huang Fu, evicted the last Emperor Puyi from the Forbidden City and invited Sun Yat-sen to Beijing to resurrect the Republican government and reunify the country. Despite being severely ill already, Sun came to Beijing and died there in April 1925.

=== Formation of the Guominjun ===
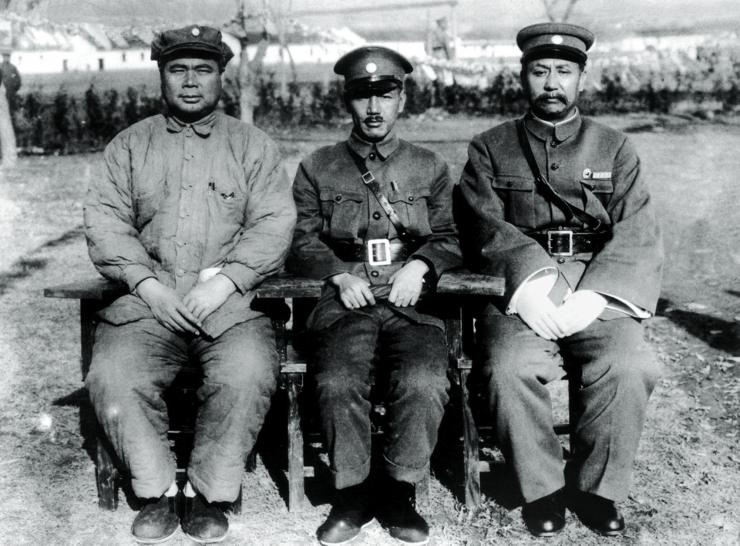
Feng Yuxiang, Chiang Kai-shek and Yan Xishan, 1928, erstwhile allies prior to the outbreak of the Central Plains War

Feng renamed his army the Guominjun or the National People's Army. In 1925, he became Northwest Frontier Defense Commissioner, and he had contacts with Nationalist figures, with Borodin and with the Soviet ambassador Lev Karakhan, while more than thirty Soviet military advisers served in his army. To counter pressure from the Zhili and Fengtian factions, he invited Duan Qirui to take on the presidency. Nevertheless, in January 1926 the Zhili and Fengtian factions jointly attacked the Guominjun, and Feng was forced out of office. His forces were defeated in the Anti-Fengtian War, lost control of Beijing and retreated to Zhangjiakou, where his army became known as the Northwest Army. In March 1926, Feng handed over his posts and left Pingdiquan for the Soviet Union by way of Outer Mongolia, where he joined the Kuomintang with Xu Qian as his sponsor. He then travelled by way of Ulan Bator and Kyakhta to Moscow. After his return, he held an oath-taking rally at Wuyuan and brought his army back into the fighting. With Soviet aid, he was able to revitalize his army.

In 1926, Sun Yat-sen's successor, Chiang Kai-shek, launched the Northern Expedition from Guangzhou against the northern warlords. Feng threw his support behind the Nationalists in the Northern Expedition and merged his Guominjun with the National Revolutionary Army. The Nationalists vanquished the Zhili faction in the south and Feng asserted control over much of north-central China. Zhang Zuolin was forced to withdraw the Fengtian forces back to Manchuria. In 1927, Feng became commander of the Second Army Group of the National Revolutionary Army. Later that year, he backed Chiang against the Communists and other left-wing opponents, to the disappointment of the Soviets.

In early July 1927, Feng Yuxiang allied with Chiang to form a new government in Shaanxi and implemented the White Terror there. By September 1927, they had killed 496 people including students. The Communist central authorities ordered the Shaanxi party branch to respond with peasant revolts. These early responses failed and in March 1928 the Weihua Uprising began.

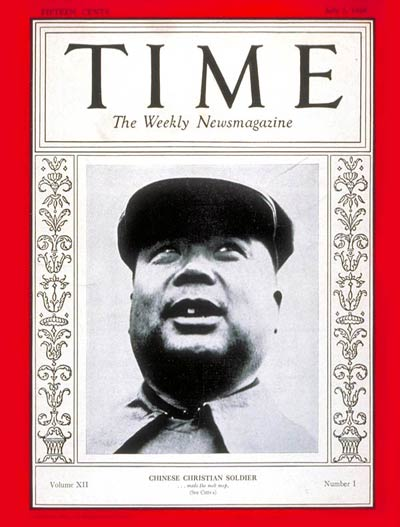
Feng Yuxiang on the cover of Time, 2 July 1928

In 1928, Feng and Yan Xishan reoccupied Beijing. In October 1928, Feng Yuxiang was appointed as Vice President of the Executive Yuan and War Minister of the Republic of China in Chiang Kai-shek's Nationalist government. Feng's patriotism was a basic motivation. Because of atrocities he saw Japanese soldiers commit during the Sino-Japanese War of 1895, Feng promised that he would fight the Japanese to death if he ever became a soldier. Every year from 1915 onward, on the anniversary of Japan's 21 Demands, he and his officers wore belts on which was written "In Memory of the National Humiliation of May 7th".

=== Central Plains War ===
By early 1929, Feng grew dissatisfied with Chiang Kai-shek's Nationalist government in Nanjing. He declared his independence from the Kuomintang government, and he joined Yan Xishan and Li Zongren to challenge Chiang's supremacy, but in 1930 he was defeated by Chiang in the Central Plains War and went into exile. Chiang then incited anti-Yan Xishan and Feng Yuxiang sentiments among the Chinese Muslims and Mongols, encouraging them to topple their rule.

== Fall from power ==
Following his defeat in the Central Plains War, Feng spent the early 1930s criticizing Chiang Kai-shek's failure to resist Japanese aggression. On 26 May 1933, Feng Yuxiang became commander-in-chief of the Chahar People's Anti-Japanese Army, founded in Zhangjiakou, with Fang Zhenwu as front-line commander-in-chief and Ji Hongchang as front-line commander. Ji Hongchang's army, numbering over 100,000 men according to Feng, pushed against Duolun, and by July 1933, drove the Japanese and Manchukuoan troops out of Chahar Province. The army recovered four county seats, including Duolun, Kangbao, Baochang and Guyuan, and Duolun was retaken in July after 72 days of occupation. By late July Feng and Ji Hongchang established, at Zhangjiakou, the "Committee for Recovering the Four Provinces of the Northeast". Chiang Kai-shek, fearing that Communists had taken control of the Anti-Japanese Allied Army, launched a concerted siege of the army with 60,000 men. Surrounded by Chiang Kai-shek and the Japanese, Feng Yuxiang resigned his post, and on 14 August 1933 he left Zhangjiakou. Between late September and mid-October 1933, the army was defeated under attack from Nationalist and Japanese forces, and Ji Hongchang was later arrested and executed. Feng retired to Tai'an in Shandong, and during the period from 1932 to 1935 he twice lived at the Puzhao Temple on Mount Tai. There, he donated food and clothing to poor residents, helped to build a bridge, introduced fruit trees to the mountain and set up 14 elementary schools where poor children could study free of charge.

== Later years ==
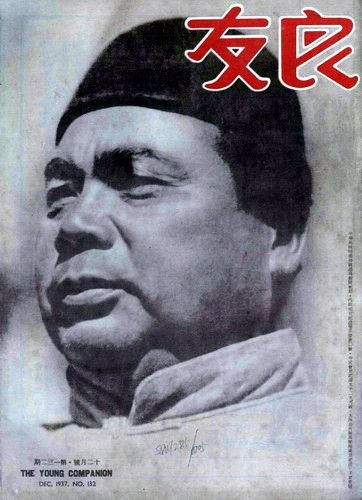
Feng Yuxiang on the cover of The Young Companion, December 1937.

Between 1935 and 1945, Feng Yuxiang supported the KMT and held various positions in the Nationalist army and government. In October 1935, Chiang invited him to Nanjing to serve as the vice-chairman of the Military Affairs Commission. He held the nominal position until 1938 and remained a member of the council until 1945. During the Xi'an Incident, when Chiang Kai-Shek was held prisoner by rebellious warlords, Feng immediately called for Chiang's release. After the Second Sino-Japanese War began in 1937, he briefly served as commander of the Third War Zone and later of the Sixth War Zone. As commander of the Third War Zone, Feng led Chinese forces early in the defense of Shanghai, and at his headquarters he assured elders from Suzhou that the generals would resolutely resist the Japanese. He was quickly relieved in favor of Zhang Zhizhong and later Chiang himself. During the war, he also wrote many poems praising Chinese soldiers.

After World War II, he traveled to the United States, where he was an outspoken critic of the Chiang regime and of the Truman administration which supported it. In 1948, he gave a lecture tour of the United States in which he criticized Chiang. For several months, he stayed in Berkeley, California, as a visiting scholar.

Although he was never a Communist himself, he was close to them in his final years.

== Death ==
On 31 July 1948, Feng left New York with his family aboard the Soviet liner Pobeda, intending to return to China by way of the Soviet Union. The Chinese Communist leadership had approved funds for the voyage. On 1 September 1948, as the ship neared Odessa on the Black Sea, a fire broke out, and according to the official Soviet account it began when a sailor rewinding film reels caused a spark that ignited flammable film and phonograph records. Feng and his youngest daughter were among the dead. Some believe he was murdered by his political adversaries, while others reject this theory. Suspicion fell variously on Chiang's agents and on Soviet agents, while Joseph Stalin believed that American agents had sabotaged the ship, and Feng's widow, Li Dequan, publicly insisted that the fire had been an accident. Mao Zedong and Zhu De sent telegrams of condolence, and on 2 November 1948 Li Dequan arrived in Harbin with his ashes.

== Legacy ==
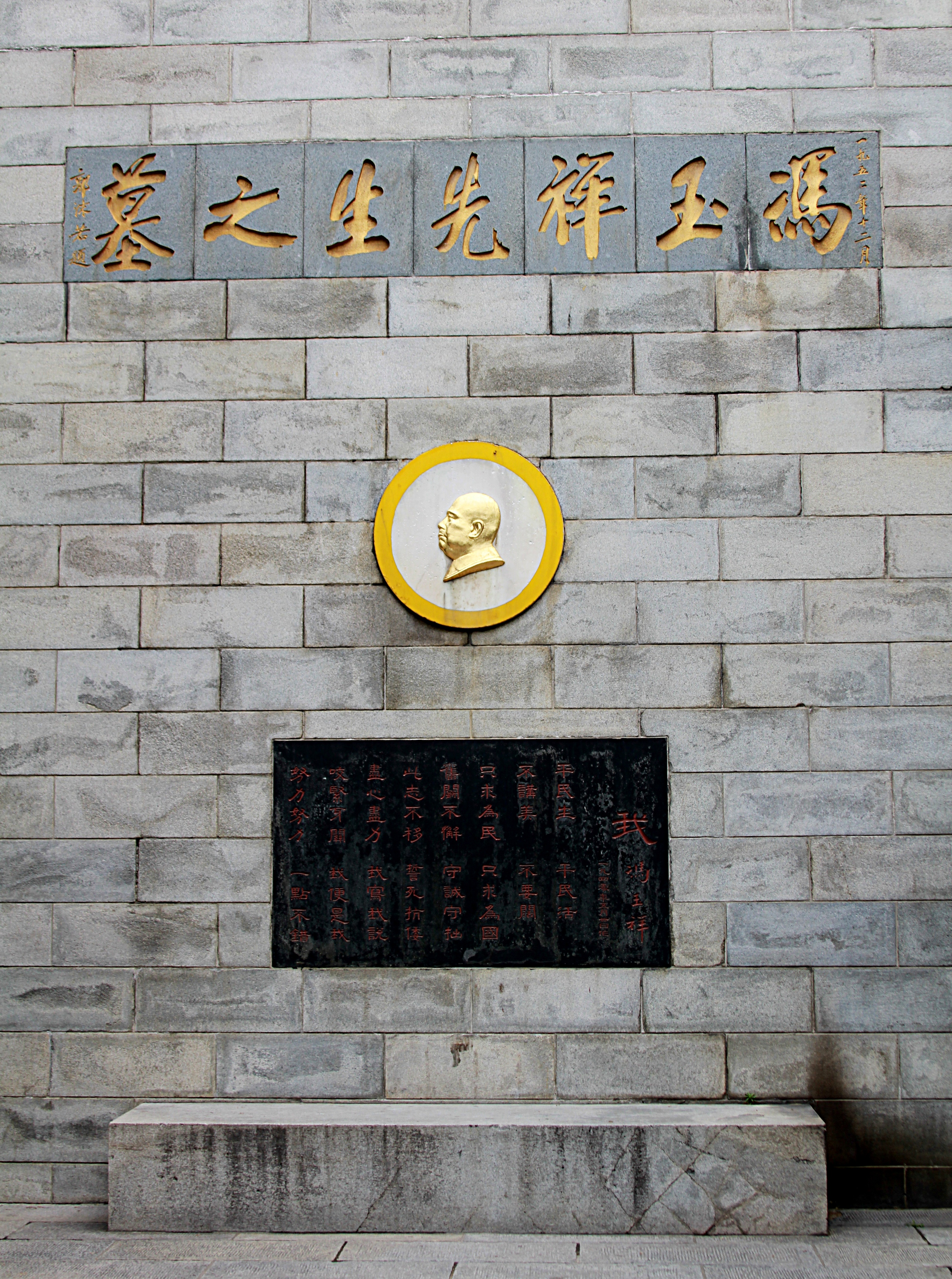
Tomb of Feng Yuxiang at the foot of Mount Tai in Shandong.

In accordance with Feng's will, his remains were buried with honors in 1953 at Mount Tai in Shandong. His tomb is located immediately to the east of Tianwai Village square (36°12′25.86″N 117°6′7.95″E). His widow, Li Dequan, served as Minister of Health of the People's Republic of China.

At a ceremony for the interring of Feng's ashes in 1953, Premier Zhou Enlai stated: "Like all historical figures, he had certain shortcomings due to the limitations of his political perspective, but these flaws do not overshadow his virtues. General Feng Yuxiang's contributions to the cause of democracy in China will live on forever."

Many of Feng Yuxiang's former subordinates joined or merged into the Kuomintang's National Revolutionary Army and fought with distinction in the Second Sino-Japanese War. They include Song Zheyuan, Tong Linge, Zhao Dengyu, Sun Lianzhong, Liu Ruming, Feng Zhi'an, Yang Hucheng, Ji Hongchang and Zhang Zizhong. A notable exception was Sun Liangcheng, who collaborated with the Japanese.

Sir Richard Evans, author of Deng Xiaoping and the Making of Modern China, described Feng as "an honest man" in his book. Peter R. Moody wrote in the Annals of the American Academy of Political and Social Science "Many of Feng's allies might dispute this, since he betrayed every one of them."

In the 2009 historical drama The Founding of a Republic, he is portrayed by Chen Kaige.

== See also ==
- Warlord Era
- Central Plains War
- History of the Republic of China
- National Revolutionary Army
- Second Sino-Japanese War
- Actions in Inner Mongolia (1933–36)
