= Bashang Grasslands =

Plateau in northern China

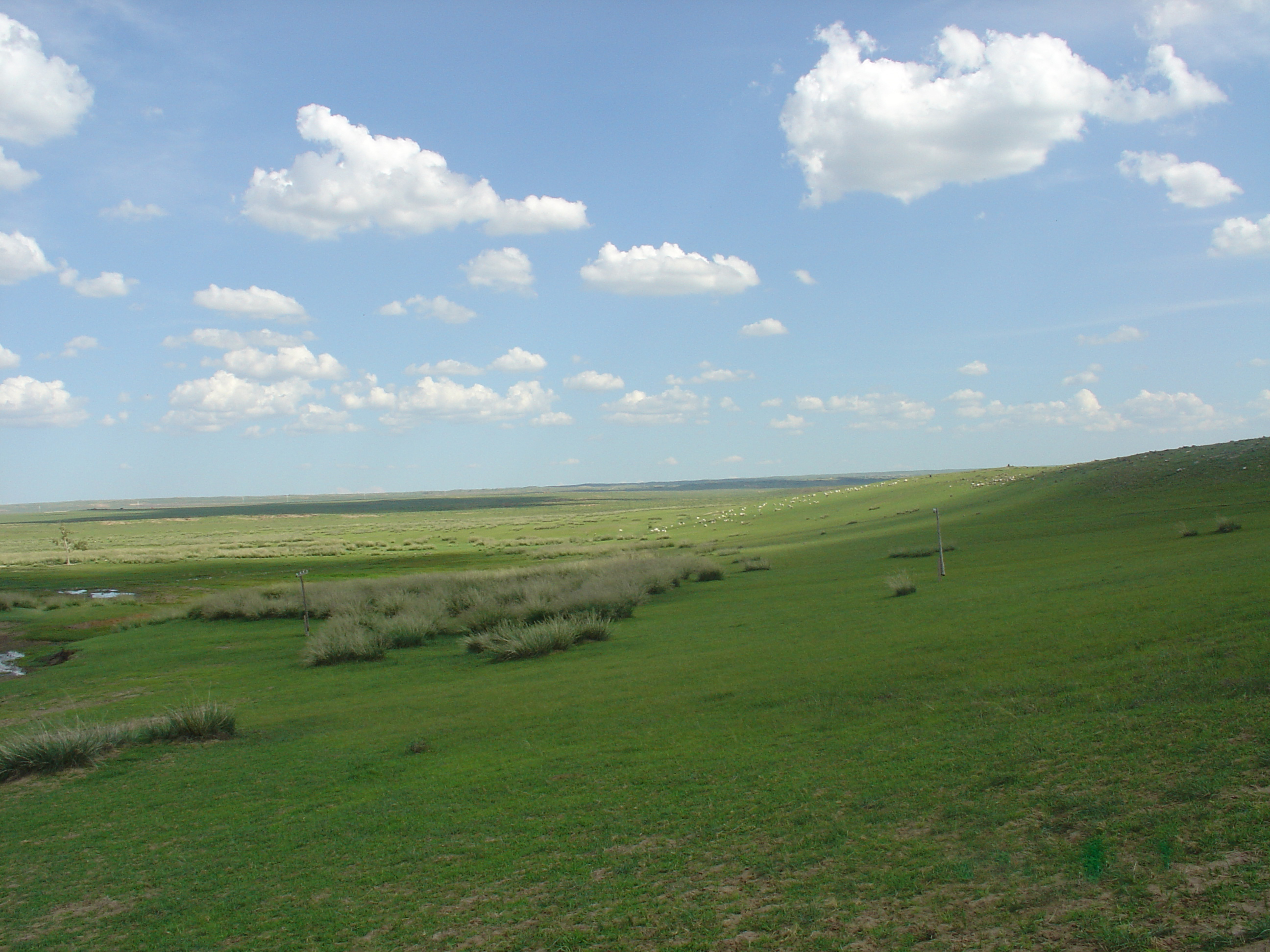
Mongolian grasslands

Bashang Plateau or Bashang Grasslands (simplified Chinese: 坝上草原; traditional Chinese: 壩上草原; pinyin: Bàshàng Cǎoyuán) covers about 16,000 square kilometres (6,200 sq mi) of northwest Hebei and bordering areas of Inner Mongolia in the counties of Zhangbei, Guyuan, Fengning, and Weichang in Hebei and Kangbao and Shangyi in Inner Mongolia.

== Topography ==
It is on average 1,300 - 1,600 meters above sea level and is part of the Inner Mongolia. Though the plateau itself is high it does not have tall mountain peaks nor depressions. From a distance it appears to be hills, but appears mostly flat land when there. The plateau is dotted with hills and many lakes. The largest lake, Angulinuo Lake is 47.6 square kilometres (18.4 sq mi) in area and 2–6 meters in depth.

== Climate ==
Average annual temperature on the plateau is 2.6 °C, and the lowest recorded temperature is −34.8 °C. The average length of frost free period is 110 days, with a minimum of 70 days. Water resources are few; most of the supply comes from wells. The area supports dry land agriculture, with limited areas of irrigation using ground water. Soil conditions are poor but the plateau is covered mostly by vast natural grasslands, a good environment for animal husbandry.
