= Shang Zhen =

Chinese general and politician (1888–1978)

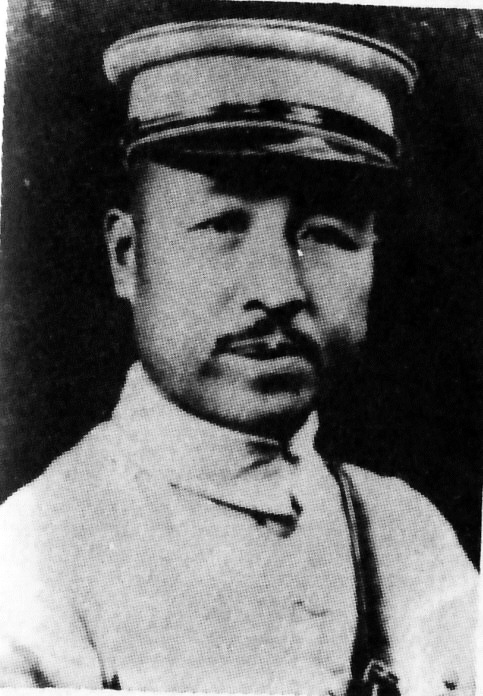
Shang Zhen

Shang Zhen (Chinese: 商震; Wade–Giles: Shang Chen; 21 September 1888 – 15 May 1978) was a general of the National Revolutionary Army during the Warlord Era, Second Sino-Japanese War and World War II. He was an early 20th century field general who won his share of wars and successful retreats. He then represented China's military in Washington and other international settings during World War II and post war Japan.

== Early life ==
Shang Zhen was born on 21 September 1888, in Baoding, Hebei province. He received his military education at the Baoding Officer Academy and joined the Tongmenghui in 1905 (the predecessor of the Kuomintang).

== Military career ==
Shang was Governor of Suiyuan Province from 1927 to 1928. He became Chairman of the Government of Hebei Province and Commander of the Beiping & Tianjin Garrison from 1928 to 1929 following the success of the Northern Expedition to unify China. From 1929 to 1930 during the Central Plains War he was Chairman of the Government of Shanxi Province. In 1931 he became the General commanding 4th Army. Then from 1931 to 1935 he commanded 32nd Army, defeating the Chahar People's Anti-Japanese Army near Beiping in October 1933. Again in 1935 he was made Chairman of the Government of Hebei Province. In 1935 he became Chairman of the Government of Henan Province until the outbreak of the Second Sino-Japanese War.

== World War II and Later ==
During World War II he was Commander in Chief 20th Army Group from 1937 to 1941, concurrently commanding the 32nd Corps until 1938. In 1939 he was made Deputy Commander in Chief 9th War Area and later the same year Deputy Commander in Chief 6th War Area. In 1940 he was made the Commander in Chief of the 6th War Area.

Following 30 years of war as field commander he was appointed Director of the Main Office of the National Military Council from 1940 to 1944. In 1941 he was given the additional duty of Director of the Foreign Affairs Bureau, National Military Council both of which he held till 1944.

From 1944 to the end of the war he was the Chinese Military attaché in Washington, D.C. In 1943, he attended the Cairo Conference accompanying Generalissimo Chiang Kai-shek. Shang Zhen and General Zhou Zhirou represented the Chinese military. Burma was an important issue of the time as a prelude to landings in coastal China and ultimately in Japan. The result was a coordinated Burma campaign. This was critical to the supply routes to inner China. In 1944 he similarly attended the Dumbarton Oaks conference to charter the United Nations. His reports and activity on behalf of his country earned enough respect from President Truman to a White House reception, even though not all requests were accepted.

After the war in 1946, Shang was appointed Head of Chinese Military Mission in Japan, the official Chinese delegate to the Allied Council. He resigned in March, 1949, retiring to Japan, keeping in touch with several other Chinese Mission members including Zhu Shiming, Zhang Dinghuang and others. He died 15 May 1978.

== Sources ==
- 中国抗战正向战场作战记 China’s Anti-Japanese War Combat Operations
  - Guo Rugui, editor-in-chief Huang Yuzhang
  - Jiangsu People's Publishing House
  - Date published: 2005-7-1
  - ISBN 7-214-03034-9
- Hsu Long-hsuen and Chang Ming-kai, History of The Sino-Japanese War (1937–1945) 2nd Ed.,1971. Translated by Wen Ha-hsiung, Chung Wu Publishing; 33, 140th Lane, Tung-hwa Street, Taipei, Taiwan Republic of China.
