= Ji Hongchang =

Chinese general (1895–1934)

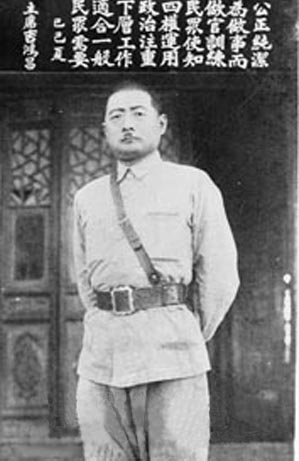
- Born: 1895; Fugou, Henan
- Died: 1934 (aged 38–39); Peking

Ji Hongchang (Chinese: 吉鴻昌; 1895–1934), born Ji Hengli, was a Chinese general and patriot.

Hongchang was born in Fugou, Henan province. He started his military career in 1913 under General Feng Yuxiang. He was the commander of the 22nd Army when he was appointed as Ningxia chairman. Refusing to attack the Red Army led by the Communist Party while the whole country was threatened by Japan, he was sacked by Chiang Kai-shek and ordered to "observe and study" abroad. He returned to China in 1932. In May 1933, he helped to organize the Chahar People's Anti-Japanese Army together with Feng Yuxiang and Fang Zhenwu and directed it along the front line against the Japanese invaders. The army recovered the Japanese-controlled Duolun (now in Inner Mongolia) and built nationwide confidence to fight against the Japanese. In October, the People's Army was extinguished, by Chiang Kai-shek who mobilized sixteen divisions against them. Ji Hongchang fought on for a while before seeking asylum in Tianjin foreign concessions in January 1934.

Chiang's policy to "extinguish the outlaws (the Communists) before fighting against invaders" disappointed him. As a result, he joined the Communist Party in March 1934. On April 24, Ji established the "Great Anti-Fascism Alliance of Chinese People" in Tianjin, with Feng Yuxiang, and Fang Zhenwu. Kuomintang agents injured Ji Hongchang in an assassination attempt on November 9, and colluded with French police in extraditing Ji Hongchang for execution in Peking on November 24.

Before his death, Ji reportedly asked his executioner for a chair, citing that he was a patriot fighting Japanese invaders and therefore should neither be kneeling nor falling when he dies, as well as demanding to be shot from the front, as he wanted to "see how the enemy's bullet kills me".

== Film ==
A Chinese film based on his life, 吉鸿昌 (Ji Hongchang), was released in China in 1979. It was a box office blockbuster, selling 380 million tickets in China.
