= Chahar People's Anti-Japanese Army =

World War II-era Chinese military unit

- 察哈尔民众抗日同盟军
- Country: (Republic of China (1912–1949)) Republic of China
- Engagements: Actions in Inner Mongolia (1933–1936)

Commanders
- Notable commanders: Feng Yuxiang; Ji Hongchang

The Chahar People's Anti-Japanese Army consisted mostly of former Northwestern Army units under Feng Yuxiang, troops from Fang Zhenwu's Resisting Japan and Saving China Army, remnants of the provincial forces from Rehe, anti-Japanese resistance armies and local forces from Chahar and Suiyuan. Even the Japanese puppet Liu Guitang switched sides, joining the Chahar People's Anti-Japanese Army, as did the Suiyuan bandit leader Wang Ying.

== See also ==
- Actions in Inner Mongolia (1933–1936)
- Anti-Japanese Allied Army campaign of 1933 order of battle

== Sources ==
- International Military Tribunal for the Far East, Chapter 5: Japanese Aggression Against China
- 中国抗日战争正面战场作战记 (China's Anti-Japanese War Combat Operations)
  - Guo Rugui, editor-in-chief Huang Yuzhang
  - Jiangsu People's Publishing House
  - Date published : 2005–7–1
  - ISBN 7-214-03034-9
  - Online in Chinese: https://web.archive.org/web/20090116005113/http://www.wehoo.net/book/wlwh/a30012/A0170.htm
