= Dushikou =

Dushikou 独石口镇
- Town
- Location in Hebei
- Coordinates: 41°18′49″N 115°43′18″E
- Country: People's Republic of China
- Province: Hebei
- Prefecture-level city: Zhangjiakou
- County: Chicheng
- Village-level divisions: 12 villages
- Elevation: 1,276 m (4,186 ft)
- Time zone: UTC+8 (China Standard)
- Area code: 0313

Dushikou
- Traditional Chinese: 獨石口
- Simplified Chinese: 独石口
- Postal: Tushihkow
- Literal meaning: Lone Stone Gate
Transcriptions
Standard Mandarin
- Hanyu Pinyin: Dúshíkǒu
- Wade–Giles: Tu-shih-k'ou

Dushikou is a town in northern Chicheng County, Hebei province, China, located about 120 kilometres (75 mi) northeast of Zhangjiakou and 45 km (28 mi) north-northwest of the county seat.

== History ==
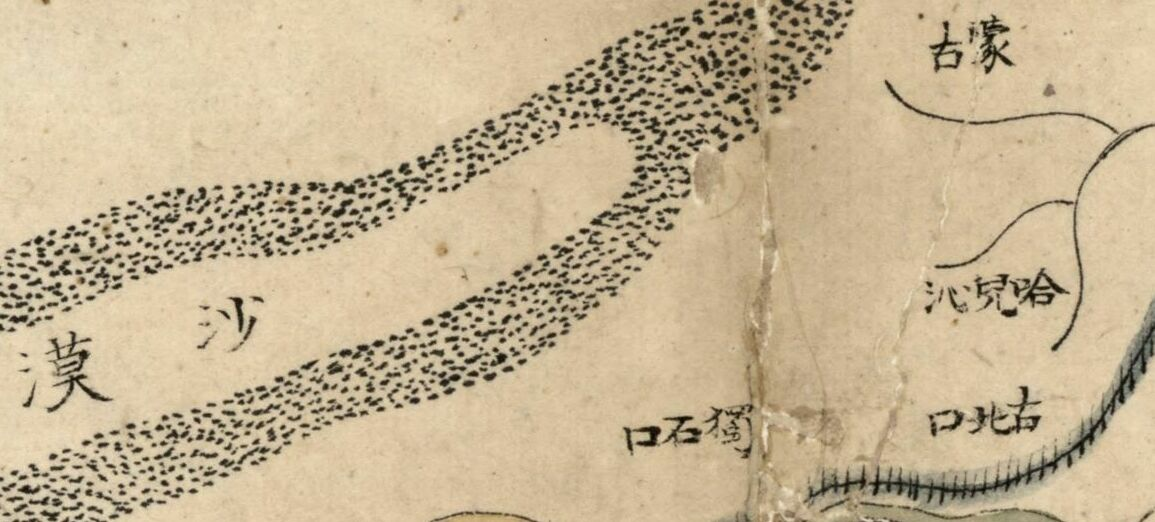
Gubeikou and Dushikou marked as the principal gateways through the Great Wall on the general map in the 1754 Provincial Atlas of the Qing Empire

Dushikou is an ancient town, first built in the Tang dynasty. It still contains stone paved streets and old buildings. It is located at one of the passes in the Great Wall for which it is named. As of 2011, it has 12 villages under its administration.

== See also ==
- List of township-level divisions of Hebei
