= Fang Zhenwu =

Republic of China general

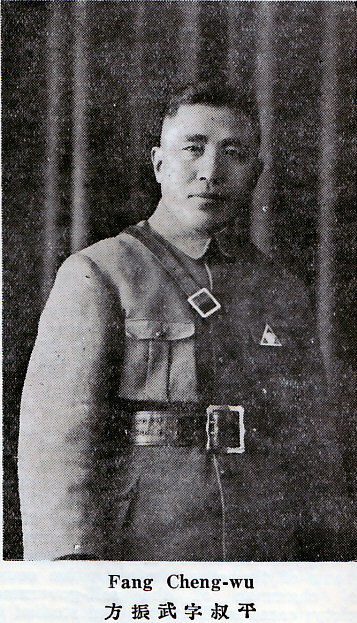
- Born: 1885; Shou County, Anhui, China
- Died: 1941 (aged 55–56); Zhongshan, Guangdong, China
- Military career
- Allegiance: National Revolutionary Army
- Service years: 1910–1941
- Rank: General
- Commands: Chahar People's Anti-Japanese Army
- Conflicts: Second Sino-Japanese War

Fang Zhenwu (Chinese: 方振武; pinyin: Fāng Zhènwǔ; 1885 – December 1941), or Fang Cheng-wu, was a general of the Republic of China and anti-Japanese leader. He ran afoul of the Kuomintang leadership and was assassinated in 1941.

== Biography ==
=== Early life ===
Fang was born in 1885 in Shou County, Lu'an, Anhui province, in the late Qing dynasty.

=== Military career ===
Fang took part in the Xinhai Revolution of 1911 and joined the revolutionary New Army in Shanghai. However, after the defeat of Sun Yat-sen in his revolt against Yuan Shikai, Fang went into exile in Japan, becoming a member of the Chinese Revolutionary Party. In 1918, he returned to China per Sun's orders as commander of a battalion in Sun's rival government in Guangdong and, in 1921, relocated to Shanghai as a member of the inner circle of the new Kuomintang government. However, the new Chinese government was soon rent with factionalism, and Fang sided with the northern Beiyang Government and eventually served in the Fengtian clique army under Zhang Zongchang until 1925, when he went over to the Nationalist army of General Feng Yuxiang. He rose to be commander of the 3rd Army, and later of the 4th Army Group, as well as commander of Jinan garrison before receiving the post of chairman of the government of Anhui province in 1929.

Due to his dissatisfaction with Chiang Kai-shek, he was detained and removed from office in October 1929. Following the Japanese invasion of Jehol in February 1933, Fang joined the Anti-Japanese National Salvation Movement. He organized the Movement's forces in China and led them north to confront the Japanese. On May 26, Fang united with Feng Yuxiang at Zhangjiakou and organized the Chahar People's Anti-Japanese Army Alliance, being its commander of the North Route, fighting against Japanese in the east of Chahar province. The army had some success, capturing Duolun for a time from the Japanese and their collaborators.

However, the Chahar People's Anti-Japanese Army was eventually beaten back by the Imperial Japanese Army and dispersed by the forces of Chiang Kai-shek, who still wished to reach an agreement with Japan and make war on the Communist Party and its Red Army.

=== Assassination ===
Living in Guilin for a time, Fang had to move to Hong Kong in 1939 under threat by the Kuomintang. He left when the Japanese occupied Hong Kong in 1941 but was assassinated by Kuomintang agents on his way back to Guangdong with crowds of refugees in December 1941, near Zhongshan, in Guangdong Province.

== See also ==
- Harry Fang – son and doctor
- Anson Chan – granddaughter from his son Fang Shin-hau
