= Duolun County =

Duolun County 多伦县 • ᠳᠣᠯᠣᠨ ᠨᠠᠭᠤᠷ ᠰᠢᠶᠠᠨ To-lun
- County
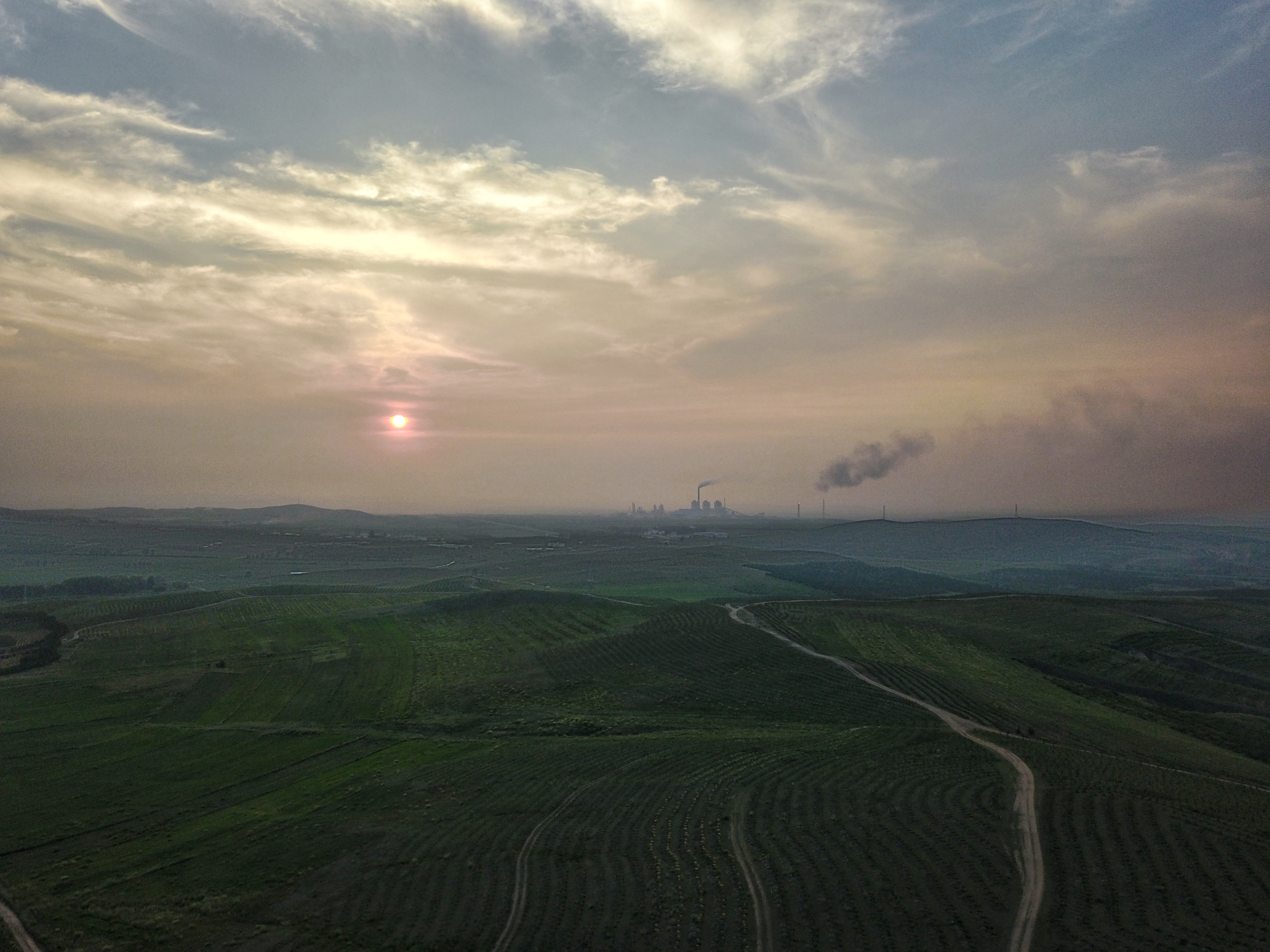

- Location in Inner Mongolia Duolun (China)
- Coordinates: 42°11′N 116°28′E
- Country: China
- Autonomous region: Inner Mongolia
- League: Xilingol
- County seat: Dolonnur Town

Area
  - Total: 3,876 km^{2} (1,497 sq mi)

Population (2020)
  - Total: 103,736
  - Density: 26.76/km^{2} (69.32/sq mi)
- Time zone: UTC+8 (China Standard)
- Postal code: 027300
- Area code: 0479
- Website: www.dlx.gov.cn

Duolun County

Chinese name
- Simplified Chinese: 多伦县
- Traditional Chinese: 多倫縣
Transcriptions
Standard Mandarin
- Hanyu Pinyin: Duōlún Xiàn

Mongolian name
- Mongolian Cyrillic: Долнуур шянь
- Mongolian script: ᠳᠣᠯᠣᠨ ᠨᠠᠭᠤᠷ ᠰᠢᠶᠠᠨ
Transcriptions
- SASM/GNC: Dolonnuur siyan

Duolun County (Mongolian: ᠳᠣᠯᠣᠨ ᠨᠠᠭᠤᠷ ᠰᠢᠶᠠᠨ; Chinese: 多伦县) is a county of Inner Mongolia, China. It is under the administration of Xilingol League.

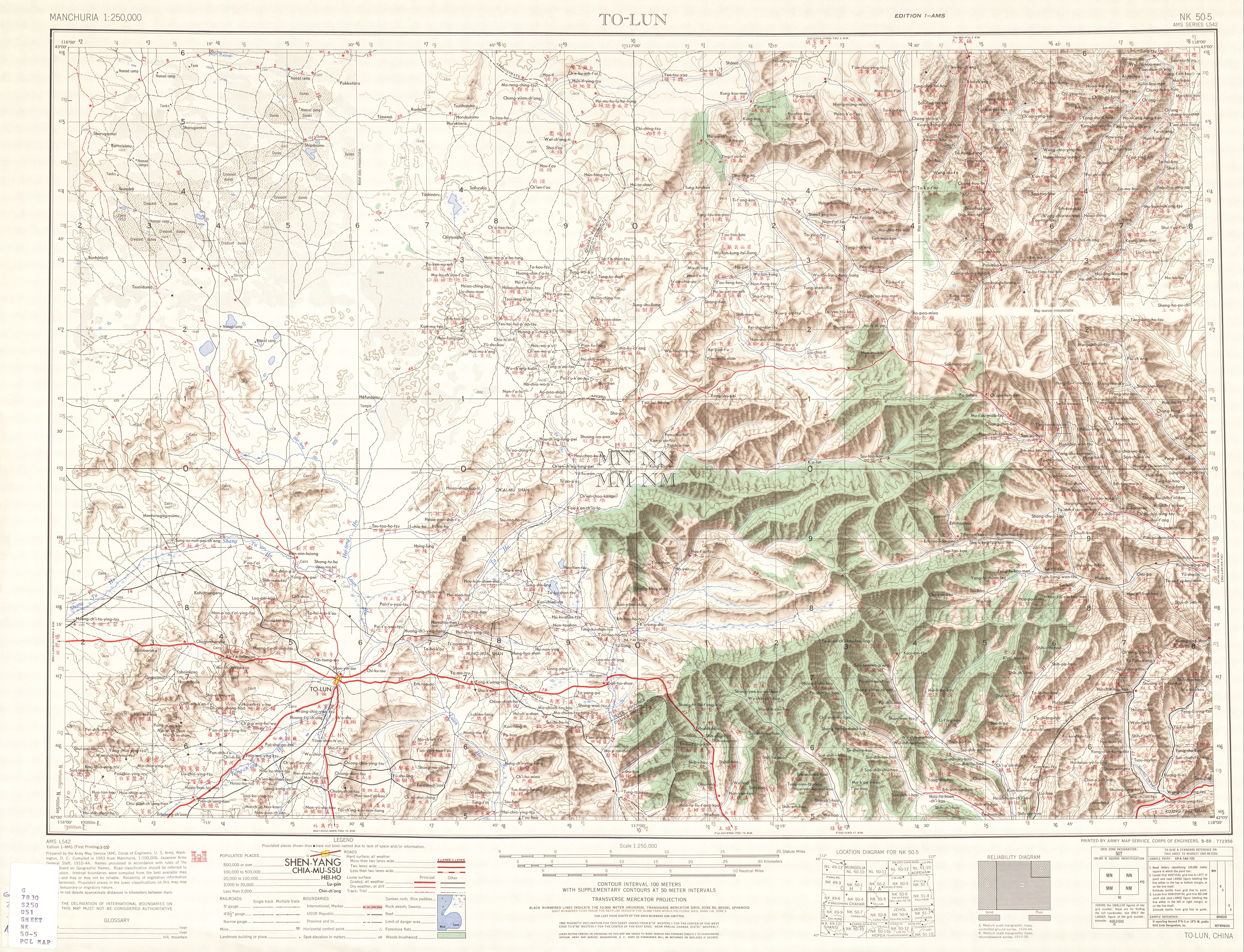
Map including Duolun (labeled as TO-LUN 多倫) (AMS, 1953)

== Climate ==
Duolun County has a dry, monsoon-influenced humid continental climate (Köppen Dwb), with bitterly cold and very dry winters, warm, humid summers, and strong winds, especially in spring. The monthly 24-hour average temperature ranges from −16.9 °C (1.6 °F) in January to 19.4 °C (66.9 °F) in July, with the annual mean at 2.78 °C (37.0 °F). The annual precipitation is 378 millimetres (14.9 in), with more than half of it falling in July and August alone. With monthly percent possible sunshine ranging from 56% in July to 77% in January and February, sunshine is abundant year-round, with 3,036 hours of bright sunshine annually.

The desertification in early 2000s has been largely checked by the effort of reforestation.

Climate data for Duolun County, elevation 1,245 m (4,085 ft), (1991–2020 normals, extremes 1951–present)
Month	Jan	Feb	Mar	Apr	May	Jun	Jul	Aug	Sep	Oct	Nov	Dec	Year
Record high °C (°F)	6.8 (44.2)	13.9 (57.0)	21.5 (70.7)	28.8 (83.8)	33.5 (92.3)	35.0 (95.0)	36.8 (98.2)	34.1 (93.4)	31.7 (89.1)	25.0 (77.0)	19.0 (66.2)	12.3 (54.1)	36.8 (98.2)
Mean daily maximum °C (°F)	−9.4 (15.1)	−4.1 (24.6)	4.0 (39.2)	12.8 (55.0)	19.8 (67.6)	24 (75)	26.1 (79.0)	24.8 (76.6)	19.8 (67.6)	11.6 (52.9)	1.2 (34.2)	−7.2 (19.0)	10.3 (50.5)
Daily mean °C (°F)	−16.3 (2.7)	−11.8 (10.8)	−3.3 (26.1)	5.4 (41.7)	12.6 (54.7)	17.2 (63.0)	19.7 (67.5)	18.0 (64.4)	12.1 (53.8)	4.0 (39.2)	−5.7 (21.7)	−13.8 (7.2)	3.2 (37.7)
Mean daily minimum °C (°F)	−21.7 (−7.1)	−17.9 (−0.2)	−9.7 (14.5)	−1.7 (28.9)	4.8 (40.6)	10.2 (50.4)	13.7 (56.7)	11.6 (52.9)	5.2 (41.4)	−2.3 (27.9)	−11.1 (12.0)	−18.8 (−1.8)	−3.1 (26.4)
Record low °C (°F)	−38.4 (−37.1)	−35.9 (−32.6)	−30.1 (−22.2)	−16.3 (2.7)	−6.0 (21.2)	−2.8 (27.0)	4.6 (40.3)	1.7 (35.1)	−6.1 (21.0)	−16.2 (2.8)	−31.0 (−23.8)	−36.2 (−33.2)	−38.4 (−37.1)
Average precipitation mm (inches)	1.6 (0.06)	3.3 (0.13)	5.6 (0.22)	14.9 (0.59)	33.8 (1.33)	67.0 (2.64)	104.3 (4.11)	77.2 (3.04)	48.8 (1.92)	19.2 (0.76)	7.7 (0.30)	1.8 (0.07)	385.2 (15.17)
Average precipitation days (≥ 0.1 mm)	2.8	3.4	4.1	5.5	8.5	12.6	14.1	10.3	9.7	6.2	4.5	3.7	85.4
Average snowy days	9.2	8.7	8.1	4.7	1.0	0	0	0	0.3	4.0	8.2	10.9	55.1
Average relative humidity (%)	66	60	49	43	45	59	70	70	64	58	61	65	59
Mean monthly sunshine hours	213.9	220.4	261.0	262.2	278.7	252.2	244.5	253.2	238.2	235.3	201.8	198.3	2,859.7
Percentage possible sunshine	73	73	70	65	61	55	53	60	65	70	70	70	65
Source: China Meteorological Administrationall-time May high

== Administrative divisions ==
Duolun County is divided into 3 towns and 2 townships.

Name	Simplified Chinese	Hanyu Pinyin	Mongolian (Hudum Script)	Mongolian (Cyrillic)	Administrative division code
Towns
Dabeigou Town	大北沟镇	Dàběigōu Zhèn	ᠳ᠋ᠠ ᠪᠧᠢ ᠭᠧᠦ ᠪᠠᠯᠭᠠᠰᠤ	Да бей гүү балгас	152531100
Dolonnur Town	多伦诺尔镇	Duōlúnnuò'ěr Zhèn	ᠳᠣᠯᠣᠨ ᠨᠠᠭᠤᠷ ᠪᠠᠯᠭᠠᠰᠤ	Долон нуур балгас	152531101
Luanyuan Town	滦源镇	Luányuán Zhèn	ᠯᠤᠸᠠᠨ ᠶᠤᠸᠠᠨ ᠪᠠᠯᠭᠠᠰᠤ	Луан юан балгас	152531102
Townships
Caimugou Township	蔡木山乡	Càimùshān Xiāng	ᠼᠠᠢ ᠮᠦ ᠱᠠᠨ ᠰᠢᠶᠠᠩ	Цай мү шин шиян	152531201
Xigangou Township	西干沟乡	Xīgàngōu Xiāng	ᠰᠢ ᠭᠠᠨ ᠭᠧᠦ ᠰᠢᠶᠠᠩ	Ший ган гүү шиян	152531202

Other: Duolun New Industrial Chemical Zone (多伦新型工业化化工区)

== Historic sites ==
The Chinese state news agency Xinhua announced in January 2018 the discovery of ruins of an ancient palace that served as the summer retreat for the elite in the Liao dynasty. The royal family and retinue would relocate each year from mid-April to mid-July to avoid the heat. More than 100 structural components at the site have been found and the foundations of 12 buildings have been recorded. Artifacts found include: glazed tiles, pottery and copper nails. Ge Zhiyong, a researcher with the Inner Mongolia Autonomous Region Institute of Archaeology, date the artifacts to the mid-Liao dynasty. The dynasty was the first of many dynasties of nomadic origin to merge its nomadic structure and culture with the Chinese style of government.
