= Rehe Province =

Former province of China

Rehe 熱河 Jehol
- Province
- Province of Rehe
- Location in the Republic of China

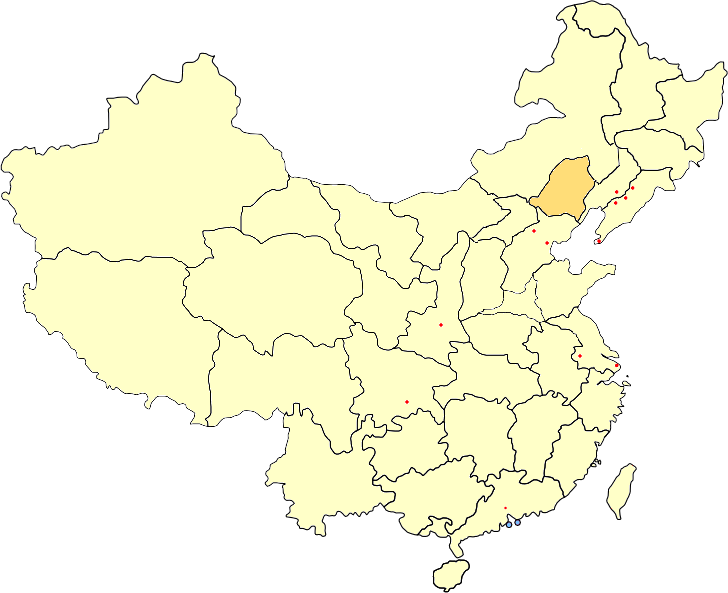
- Location in the People's Republic of China
- Country: Republic of China; People's Republic of China
- Jehol Special Administrative Region: 1914
- Established: 1923
- Abolished: 1955
- Capital: Chengde

Area
  - Total: 179,982 km^{2} (69,491 sq mi)

Population (1947)
  - Total: 6,106,974
  - Density: 33.9310/km^{2} (87.8810/sq mi)
- Preceded by: Zhili
- Succeeded by: Hebei; Liaoning; Inner Mongolia

Rehe Province

Chinese name
- Traditional Chinese: 熱河省
- Simplified Chinese: 热河省
- Postal: Jehol Province
- Literal meaning: Hot River Province
Transcriptions
Standard Mandarin
- Hanyu Pinyin: Rèhé Shěng
- Wade–Giles: Jê-ho Sheng

Rehe Special Area
- Traditional Chinese: 熱河特別區
- Simplified Chinese: 热河特别区
- Postal: Jehol Special Area
Transcriptions
Standard Mandarin
- Hanyu Pinyin: Rèhé Tèbiéqū
- Wade–Giles: Jê-ho T'e-pieh-ch'ü

Mongolian name
- Mongolian script: ᠬᠠᠯᠠᠭᠤᠨ ᠭᠣᠣᠯ

Rehe, previously romanized as Jehol, was a former Chinese special administrative region and province centered on the city of Rehe, now known as Chengde.

== Administration ==
Rehe was north of the Great Wall of China and east of Mongolia in southwestern Manchuria. Its capital and largest city was Chengde. The second largest city was Chaoyang, followed by Chifeng. The province covered 114,000 square kilometers.

== History ==
Rehe was once at the core of the Khitan-led Liao Dynasty. Rehe was conquered by the Manchu banners before they took possession of Beijing in 1644. Between 1703 and 1820, the Qing emperors spent almost each summer in their summer Mountain Resort in Chengde. They governed the empire from Chengde, and received their foreign diplomats and representatives of vassal and tributary countries. The Kangxi emperor restricted the admission to the forests and prairies of Rehe to the court's hunting expeditions and to the maintenance of the imperial cavalry. Agricultural settlements were at first forbidden to Han Chinese. In the early 19th century, by which time Rehe had become part of the province of Zhili, migrants from Hebei and Liaoning settled in Rehe and displaced the Mongol communities.

The Republic of China created the Jehol Special Area in 1914 and Jehol Province in 1923. To form a buffer zone between China proper and Japanese-controlled Manchukuo, the Imperial Japanese Army invaded Jehol in Operation Nekka on 21 January 1933. It was subsequently annexed by the Empire of Manchukuo, as Jehol Province. The seizure of Jehol deteriorated relations between Japan and China, and was one of the incidents that led to the Second Sino-Japanese War.

At the end of World War II, when the Republic of China resumed control of Manchuria, the Kuomintang government continued to administer the area as a separate province, reverting its name to Jehol Province, with its capital in Hailar. After the Communist victory in the Chinese Civil War, establishment of the People's Republic of China, and enactment of pinyin in 1958, the area has retrospectively become known as Rehe Province. However, the province had already been divided between Hebei Province, Liaoning Province, Tianjin, and Inner Mongolia in 1955.

== Bibliography ==
- Hedin, Sven (1933). Jehol: City of Emperors. Reprint (2000): Pilgrim's Book House, Varanasi. ISBN 81-7769-009-4.
- Forêt, Philippe (2000). "Mapping Chengde. The Qing Landscape Enterprise". 2000: University of Hawaii Press, Honolulu. ISBN 0-8248-2293-5.
