= Chahar Province =

Province of the Republic of China

Coordinates: 43°N 115°E

Chahar Province 察哈爾省 ᠴᠠᠬᠠᠷ ᠮᠣ᠊᠊ᠵ᠊ᠢ
- Province of the Republic of China (1928–1948); Province of the People's Republic of China (1948–1952)
- 1948–1952
- Map of Chahar within the ROC
- Capital: Changyuan (Note: Zhangjiakou Subprefecture (Chinese: 張家口廳; pinyin: Zhāngjiākǒu Tīng), also known as the Zhang Capital (Chinese: 張垣; pinyin: Zhāng Yuán), and referred in some older Western literature as Kalgan (Хаалга: Mongolian for gate). Now Zhangjiakou City, Hebei.)
- Area
  - 1947: 278,957 km^{2} (107,706 sq mi)
- Population
  - 1947: 2,150,054
- History
  - Chahar Special Administrative Region established: 1914
  - Established: 1928
  - Disestablished: 1952
Preceded by	Succeeded by
Zhili (province)	Hebei; Shanxi
- Today part of: China ∟ Inner Mongolia ∟ Hebei ∟ Beijing

Chahar (Mongolian: ᠴᠠᠬᠠᠷ/ Чахар; Chinese: 察哈爾; pinyin: Cháhā'ěr), also known as Chaha'er, Chakhar or Qahar, was a province of the Republic of China in existence from 1912 to 1936, mostly covering territory in what is part of Eastern Inner Mongolia. It was named after the Chahar Mongols.

== Administration and history ==
Chahar Province is named after the Chahar, a tribal group of the Mongols who live in that area. The area was controlled (in part or fully) by various empires that ruled over China's north including the Han, Tang, Liao, and Jin dynasties. After the unification of the Mongol tribes under Genghis Khan, the area came under Yuan rule. After the Yuan dynasty (1271–1368), the area was a battleground between the Ming dynasty and Northern Yuan. Then the Chahar tribe became the personal appanage of the monarchs of the Northern Yuan dynasty since the reign of Batumongke Dayan Khan (r. 1479–1517). By the late Qing dynasty (1644–1912), Chahar was the "Zhangyuan Special Region" (張垣特區), although Yao Xiguang (姚錫光) proposed making Chahar a province as early as 1908.

=== Republic of China era ===
In 1913, the second year of the Republic of China, Chahar Special Administrative Region was created as a subdivision of Zhili Province, containing 6 banners and 11 counties:

- Zhāngbèi (張北)
- Duōlún (多倫)
- Gǔyuán (沽源)
- Shāngdū (商都)
- Bǎochāng (寶昌)
- Kāngbǎo (康保)
- Xīnghé (興和)
- Táolín (陶林)
- Jíníng (集寧)
- Fēngzhèn (豐鎮)
- Liángchéng (涼城)

In 1928, it became a province. The last five counties on the above list (starting from Xinghe) were partitioned to Suiyuan province. And ten counties were included from Xuanhua Prefecture (宣化府), Koubei Circuit (口北道), Hebei Province:

- Xuānhuà (宣化)
- Chìchéng (赤城)
- Wànquán (萬全)
- Huáilái (懷來)
- Yù (蔚)
- Yángyuán (陽原)
- Lóngguān (龍關)
- Yánqìng (延慶)
- Huái'ān (懷安)
- Zhuōlù (涿鹿)

All banners belong to the Shilingol League (ᠰᠢᠯᠢ ᠶᠢᠨᠭᠣᠤᠯ, 锡林郭勒盟).

From 1937 to 1945, it was occupied by Japan and made a part of Mengjiang, a Japanese-controlled region led by Mongol Prince Demchugdongrub of Shilingol. The Chahar People's Anti-Japanese Army Alliance (察哈爾民眾抗日同盟軍) was established in Kalgan on May 26, 1933 by Feng Yuxiang (馮玉祥) and Ji Hongchang (吉鴻昌).

=== 1948–1952 ===
In 1952, six years after becoming communist, the province was abolished and divided into parts of Inner Mongolia, Beijing Municipality and Hebei.

Name	Administrative Seat	Simplified Chinese	Hanyu Pinyin	Subdivisions
Zhangjiakou	Zhangjiakou	张家口市	Zhāngjiākǒu Shì	none
Datong	Datong	大同市	Dàtóng Shì	none
Yanbei Division	Datong County	雁北专区	Yànběi Zhuānqū	13 counties
Chanan Division	Xuanhua County	察南专区	Chánán Zhuānqū	11 counties
Chabei Division	Zhangbei County	察北专区	Cháběi Zhuānqū	9 counties

== Geography ==
Chahar Province was divided north-south by the Great Wall, with North Chahar being the larger in area and South Chahar, with the capital, Zhangjiakou, being far larger in population. It had an area of 278.957 km^{2} (107.706 sq mi). In North Chahar most of the land was part of the northeastern extension of the Gobi Desert.

=== Bordered ===
- North: Xing'an
- North and West: Mongolia
- West and South: Suiyuan
- South: Shanxi and Hebei
- East: Rehe and Liaobei

== See also ==
- Inner Mongolia § Republic of China and the Second World War periods
