= North China Buffer State Strategy =

Series of political maneuverings in North China undertaken by Japan

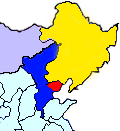
Map showing the territory of the Hebei–Chahar Political Council in blue and the East Hebei Anti-Communist Autonomous Government in red

The North China Buffer State Strategy (華北分離工作, Kahoku Bunri Kōsaku) (simplified Chinese: 华北五省自治; traditional Chinese: 華北五省自治) is the general term for a series of political manoeuvrings Japan undertook in the five provinces of northern China, Hebei, Chahar, Suiyuan, Shanxi, and Shandong. It was an operation to detach all of northern China from the power of the Nationalist Government and put it under Japanese control or influence.

In China the affair is referred to as the "North China Incident" corresponding only to the time between the series of "North China Autonomy Movements" orchestrated by the Japanese army since May 1935 and the founding of the Hebei–Chahar Political Council under Song Zheyuan in December. It is recognized as ranking alongside the Manchurian Incident, the Shanghai Incident, and the Marco Polo Bridge Incident.

== Development of the strategy ==
Between the winter of 1934 and January 1935 small-scale clashes between the Chinese and Japanese armies were occurring frequently along the cease-fire lines established by the Tanggu Truce and the Japanese army was coming to the view that they needed to clear anti-Japanese forces out of northern China.

On 7 December 1934 a decision was reached at a meeting of the Army, Navy, and Foreign Ministries of Japan concerning issues relating to policy toward China and an agenda was laid out to see to it that the power of the Chinese government did not extend to North China by setting up a pro-Japanese puppet government and extending Japan's economic rights and interests in the area, and by suppressing anti-Japanese sentiments there. In addition, the same policy was also advocated at the Dalian Conference, a meeting of intelligence operatives working in China and Mongolia hosted by the Kwantung Army early in January 1935.

Thus, the Japanese China Garrison Army and Kwantung Army concluded two pacts with the Nationalist government backed by their military might, the He–Umezu Agreement of June 10 and the Chin–Doihara Agreement of June 27. The two agreements respectively made Nationalist soldiers and officials withdraw from Hebei, and made the Nationalists and the semi-independent 29th Army pull out of Chahar. The KMT Wang-Chiang Coalition, which came into being in March 1932 with Chiang as Chairman of the National Military Commission and Wang as Premier, made these concessions to Japan through their decision to adopt the policy of "resistance while negotiating", yimian dikang yimian jiaoshe in Chinese or the Eight-Character Policy, the name under which Wang promoted it because it comprises eight Chinese characters. This was part of their larger strategy of "first internal pacification, then external resistance" or xian annei hou rangwai.

== Formation of puppet governments ==
In contemporary north China the people had witnessed the remarkable events in Manchuria while dissatisfaction was rising among the citizens and various military cliques due to heavy taxation and exploitation by the Nationalist government. Chiang Kai-shek's leverage in north China receded and in June 1935 Bai Jianwu launched an abortive coup d'état in Fengtai with the aim of establishing a pro-Japanese and pro-Manchukuo government.

Political and economic grievances increased among the masses and movements for autonomy gathered momentum in places like Shandong, Shanxi, and Hebei where the Xianghe Incident occurred in October in which peasants disavowed the Nationalist government in opposition to a KMT tax hike and demanded self-government against oppressive taxation. Then, on 3 November 1935 the Nationalists undertook a currency reform with British support and introduced the new silver standard and currency management system, but upon recalling the old currency they confronted more separatist tendencies when the Japanese-backed military leaders of north China refused to hand over the silver.

The Japanese army feared that the currency reform would strengthen of the Chinese government's economic control over north China, and they made efforts to establish a pro-Japanese puppet government in Hebei and Chahar. However, because the Japanese encountered strong resistance from the Nationalist government and because various Chinese military leaders failed to respond to their invitations, on 25 November 1935 they established as a provisional measure the East Hebei Autonomous Council, a government under Yin Ju-keng that would have jurisdiction over an area of Hebei Province demilitarized by the Tanggu Truce.

Chiang Kai-shek did not recognize Yin's declaration of autonomy and on 18 December 1935, in order to prevent the other factions in northern China from declaring their independence in the same manner, he set up the Hebei–Chahar Political Council under Song Zheyuan encompassing Beiping (now Beijing), Tianjin, and the provinces of Hebei and Chahar. In his address upon taking office, Song proclaimed a policy of anti-communism, Sino-Japanese friendship, and respect for the will of the people. At first the East Hebei Autonomous Council thought that the Hebei–Chahar Political Council was a similar type of autonomous body and considered a merger, but this idea was abandoned when they realized that the Hebei–Chahar Political Council was effectively under the control of the Nationalist government and on 25 December they asserted their full autonomy and organized the East Hebei Autonomous Anti-Communist Government.

Thus, through the manoeuvrings of Japan, the Nationalist government of China, and a variety of Chinese warlords, two different anti-communist and pro-Japanese autonomous governments were born in northern China.

On 13 January 1936 the Japanese cabinet endorsed the First Administrative Policy Toward North China, which made keeping north China separate from the Nationalist government into Japan's official national policy. This policy was reaffirmed in the second and third administrative policies of 11 August 1936 and 16 April 1937.

== Aftermath in China ==
In China frustrations with the government's policies gradually grew. When Wang Jingwei was wounded in an assassination attempt in November 1935 he left the government to recuperate. However, at the stage of the Kuomintang's Fifth Congress the same year Chiang Kai-shek did not yet close the door to a diplomatic solution, stating that "If the tipping point hasn't come, we shouldn't talk about sacrifices. We will not accept infringements on our national sovereignty, but up to that point we should strive for friendly relations and political mediation and should make the utmost efforts for peace."

In the middle of April 1936 Japan decided to reinforce the Japanese China Garrison Army and posted troops in Beiping, Tianjin, and Fengtai in May and June. The Nationalist government notified Japan of its opposition to the move and protests against Japan's policies by civilians and students occurred in Beiping, Tianjin, and other cities. The Chinese people's spirit of resistance towards Japan greatly increased and skirmishes happened repeatedly between Chinese and Japanese forces in the vicinity of Fengtai where the Japanese troops had just been stationed. Furthermore, attacks on Japanese people in places throughout China became frequent. Japan planned to expand the North China buffer state further, but their defeat in the Suiyuan Campaign only strengthened China's will to resist. After the Xi'an Incident of 12 December 1936, the detention of Chiang Kai-shek by his subordinate Zhang Xueliang, the Republic of China and the Red Army, with the brokerage of the Comintern, concluded the Second United Front and a definite shift for the Nationalists from anti-communism to resistance against the Japanese.

== Works depicting the North China Buffer State Strategy ==
- War And Men: Mountains and Rivers of Love and Sorrow, the second part of a film trilogy directed by Satsuo Yamamoto and released in 1971.

== See also ==
- Tanggu Truce
- He-Umezu Agreement
- Chin-Doihara Agreement
- East Hebei Autonomous Council
- Hebei–Chahar Political Council
- December 9th Movement
- Actions in Inner Mongolia (1933–1936)
- Mengjiang

== Bibliography ==
- Katsumi Usui 『新版 日中戦争』 Chuko Shinsho、2000
- Kohei Moriyama, edited by the Pacific War Research Association 『図説 日中戦争』Kawade Shobo Shinsha、2000
- Toshiya Iko 『満州事変から日中全面戦争へ』 Yoshikawa Kobunkan、2007
