= Guanganmen incident =

1937 battle of the Second Sino-Japanese War

Coordinates: 39°54′50″N 116°23′30″E

The Guang'anmen Incident (Japanese: 広安門事件, Hepburn: Kōanmmon Jiken), or Kuanganmen Incident, was an attack on the Japanese army by the National Revolutionary Army’s 29th Army that occurred on 26 July 1937 in the opening stages of the Second Sino-Japanese War in Beiping, now Beijing, which was the under the control of the Hebei–Chahar Political Council. It occurred following the Marco Polo Bridge Incident of 7 July, and the Langfang Incident of 25 July.

At the time, the Chinese army was already amassing in large numbers at Baoding and Shijiazhuang in the southern half of Hebei and at Datong in Shanxi, and had the Japanese army enclosed on all side in the Fengtai District, while on the Japanese side, newly mobilized units of the Kwantung Army and the Japanese Korean Army were in the process of reaching the area of Tianjin and Beiping. The Kuanganmen Incident was an incident that occurred while the degree of tension between the two armies was increasing.

== The attack ==
The 2nd Battalion of the 2nd China Garrison Infantry Regiment under Major Hirobe was bound with 26 trucks for the Japanese barracks within the walls of Beijing in order to provide protection to Japanese residents. Takuro Matsui, the head of the Special Service Agency, had had discussions beforehand with the authorities of the Hebei–Chahar Political Council concerning passage of troops through the gates of Guang'anmen just outside Beiping and had gotten the approval of the mayor Qin Dechun. However, when Major Tokutaro Sakurai, a military and political advisor to the Council, proceeded to Guang'anmen at about 6:00 PM to establish contact, the Chinese troops on guard kept the gate closed. Finally after more talks, the gates were opened at around 7:30 PM and the Japanese units started to pass through, but once the first 3 trucks had crossed the Chinese started to fire upon them. Two thirds of the units got through when the gate was suddenly shut, dividing Hirobe’s troops inside and outside the gate. They were receiving unexpectedly heavy fire from machine guns as well as grenades and because Japanese and Chinese advisors failed to calm down the Chinese troops, at 8:00 PM the Japanese attacked in response from both inside and outside the gates. The Chinese side received reinforcements and surrounded the Japanese but even though a relief column was dispatched by Masakazu Kawabe, commander of the brigade in the Fengtai District, at 9:30 PM, negotiations with the Chinese had produced a proposal according to which the Chinese army would keep its distance while the Japanese inside the gates would move to the grounds of their legation within the walls and the Japanese left outside would proceed back to Fengtai. A little after 10:00 PM the fighting stopped and at about 2:00 AM the next day Hirobe’s unit entered the barracks in the legation. The total casualties of the Japanese army in the fighting were 2 dead and 17 wounded. Both of the dead held the rank of superior private, and the breakdown of the wounded was one major, one captain, one sergeant, two superior privates, one private first class, seven privates second class, two attached civilians, and one news reporter. The interpreter who was travelling with Tokutaro Sakurai was also killed in action.

== Impact of the incident ==
The Japanese China Garrison Army judged from this incident and the clash at Langfang that prospects for a peaceful resolution were over and at 2:00 AM on 28 July they repudiated their request from the previous day in response to the Langfang Incident that each unit of China’s 29th Army pull back according to a time frame, and instead notified Song Zheyuan, the head of the Hebei–Chahar Political Council and commander of the 29th Army, that “China’s frequent aggressive activities and violations of agreements are something our army is no longer able to endure patiently. Since we above all cannot at all forgive your deceitful acts at Guanganmen, which you turned into a grave event that insulted our army, our army will now act on its on accord.” The Japanese furthermore advised the Chinese to withdraw all their forces within Beiping to spare it the ravages of the coming battle.

From early morning the Japanese China Garrison Army readied the posts needed to attack the Chinese around Beiping and Tianjin and proclaimed that they did not see the people of Hebei as their enemies and had no intention to acquire northern China, but rather were considering the rights and interests of all nations and the safety and the life and property of their citizens. The same message was announced as a speech from the Chief Cabinet Secretary.

The Japanese launched their assault against the Chinese army in the area of Beiping on 28 July and in Tianjin the Chinese attacked at midnight. The Japanese were victorious on all fronts and in two days mopping up operations were complete.

== See also ==
- Marco Polo Bridge Incident
- Langfang Incident
- Tungchow Mutiny
- Battle of Beiping–Tianjin

== Bibliography ==
- Press Corps of the War Ministry of Japan「朗坊事件以後」『官報附録 週報』 Cabinet Printing Bureau 4 August 1937.
- Senshi Sosho 支那事変陸軍作戦<1>昭和十三年一月まで (Volume 86) Asagumo Shinbun-sha, July 1975.
