= December 9th Movement =

1935 student protest against Japanese aggression in Beijing, Republic-era China

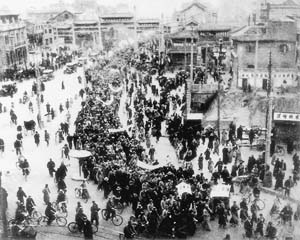
Students marching through Beijing during the December 9th Movement

The December 9th Movement (simplified Chinese: 一二•九运动; traditional Chinese: 一二•九運動) was a mass protest led by students in Beiping (present-day Beijing) on December 9, 1935, to demand that the Chinese government actively resist Japanese aggression.

== Background ==
After the Imperial Japanese Army occupied Manchuria following the Mukden Incident in 1931, it attempted to follow up with an invasion into northern China. Between June and July 1935, the Chin-Doihara Agreement was negotiated between Japan and the Chinese Kuomintang (KMT) government as a way for the former to gain control of Chahar Province. A puppet state known as "Eastern Hebei Anti-Communist Autonomous Government" was then set up by a Yin Rugeng with Japanese help. In response to the demands by Japan to create a separate regime in Northern China, the KMT government was forced to establish the "Hebei-Chahar Political Council". The Chinese Communists, on the other hand, called for a voluntary mobilization of all Chinese people to resist Japanese aggression in a proclamation published on August 1, 1935.

== Preparation ==
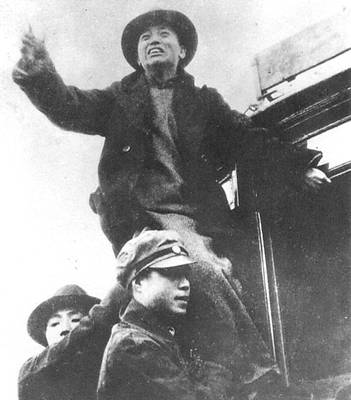
Student leader Huang Jing making a speech from a tram.

On November 18, student representatives from several major universities in Beiping gathered in a meeting and secretly formed the Beiping Students Union. An election was held and Guo Mingqiu became the executive president while the communists selected Huang Jing and Yao Yilin to participate in leading the Students Union. On December 3, the Beiping Students Union decided to correspond with as many universities as possible to organize a mass petition. Three days later, 15 schools published a declaration opposing the formation of the Anti-Communist Autonomous Government of Northern China. It demanded the KMT government to arrest Yin Rugeng and also called for a national armed resistance against Japan. A 9-point political agenda was passed the same day, among which called for the KMT to immediately stop its armed campaign against the communists in the Chinese Civil War. Since December 9 was rumored to be the day that the Hebei-Chahar Political Committee was to be established, the Students Union chose that day for the petition.

== Events ==
On the early morning of December 9, police and soldiers surrounded many schools and closed the city gate at Xizhimen. Petition students were enraged. They successfully broke the police enclosure lines. At around 10:30, they arrived at the Beiping branch of the KMT Military Committee in Zhongnanhai. In front of the Xinhua Gate, they sent the petition letters to He Yingqin, then head of the KMT Military. Angry students waved their arms and shouted slogans such as "Down with Japanese imperialism" and "Immediately stop the civil war", while a 6-point demand was given to the KMT government headquarter.

1. Oppose the Autonomous Government of Northern China and similar organizations;
2. Oppose any secret deals between China and Japan and immediately publicize the diplomatic policies combating the current crisis;
3. Protect and secure freedom of speech, of press, and of assembly;
4. Stop the civil war and prepare for a self-defense war against external threats;
5. Prohibit arbitrary arrest of the people;
6. Immediately free students who were arrested.

Representatives of He Yingqin was able to talk to the students, but they refused to let students open Xizhimen so that Tsinghua and Yenching university students can enter the city. Students then began to march en masse. The number of marching students subsequently increased to about 6,000. When the line entered Xidan and East Chang'an Avenue, some students were attacked by police and soldiers armed with wooden sticks, whips, water pumps and sabers. Hundreds were injured and more than 30 were arrested. Students from Tsinghua and Peking University who were unable to enter the city via the gates stood their ways outside the city wall in bitter cold. Some of the students wept in telling surrounding residents about atrocities the Japanese army committed in Manchuria. They blamed on the KMT government for its non-resistance policy. At the end of the day, this movement by the students forced the Hebei-Chahar Political Committee to adjourn its planned opening.

== National response ==
The protest movement was supported by students all over the country. Response was very positive as similar petitions and assemblies were organized in many large cities. The Students Union in Communist-occupied Shaanxi-Gansu district also sent telegraph to voice their support. On December 18, the All-China Federation of Trade Unions called for its workers to protest the betrayal by Japan and the arrest of numerous students in Beiping. Meanwhile, Lu Xun and Soong Ching-ling wrote articles in praise of the brave actions done by the students in Beiping. They and other social elites donated money in support. In Beiping, a propaganda troupe was also organized in which students from Beiping would tell peasants living in nearby provinces about the need of resistance against future Japanese aggression.

== Impact ==
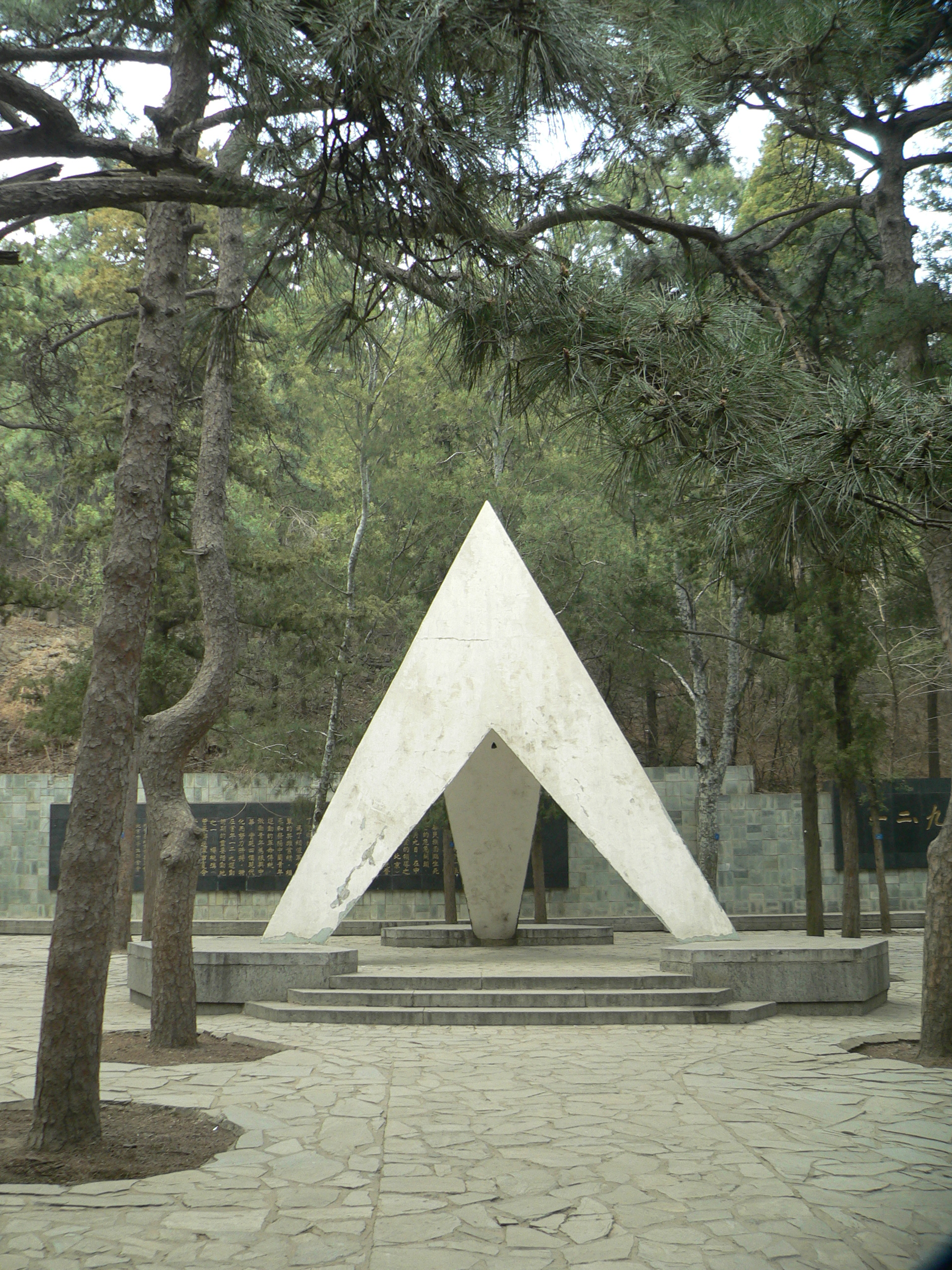
Memorial to the December 9th Movement in the Beijing Botanical Garden.

The student demonstrations generated a public outcry and forced the formation of the Hebei-Chahar Political Council to be postponed to December 18, 1935. The movement also boosted the profile and prestige of Communist student activists at a time when the Kuomintang-led government was actively suppressing Communists.

After the founding of the People's Republic of China in 1949, the December 9 Movement has been commemorated as a patriotic movement. In 1985, during the 50th Anniversary of the December 9 Movement, students demonstrated in Beijing, calling for democracy and reform to save the nation.

== See also ==
- Sons and Daughters in a Time of Storm
- Zhang Shenfu
- Yao Wenyuan
- Sun Sunquan
