= Demilitarized Zone Peace Preservation Corps =

1933–1935 police force in China

The Demilitarized Zone Peace Preservation Corps was a police force created by the 1933 Tanggu Truce between China and Japan in the aftermath of the Japanese invasion of Manchuria. Its role was to patrol and maintain order in the demilitarized zone extending from south of the Great Wall, to a line north east of the Bai River in Hebei province in northern China. At the end of 1935, with the proclamation of the Autonomous Government of Eastern Hebei, the Peace Preservation Corps was disbanded, and its forces were absorbed into the new East Hebei Army.

== Background and history ==
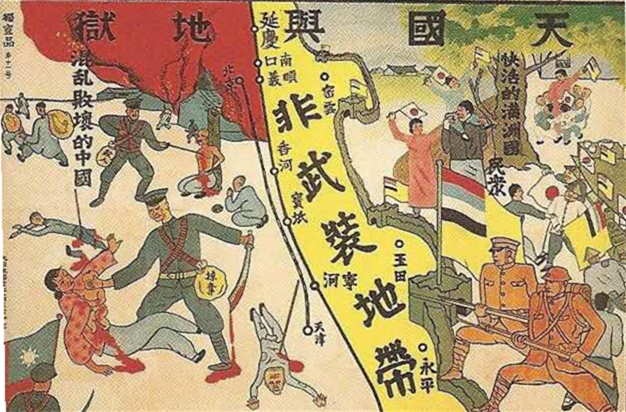
Japanese Propaganda, Unarmed zone in East Hebei.

Per the terms of the Tanggu Truce, the Imperial Japanese Army withdrew to the line of the Great Wall, and regular units of the National Revolutionary Army of the Kuomintang government of the Republic of China was withdrawn to south of the new demilitarized zone. Within the zone itself, which partially encompassed the major cities of Tianjin and Beijing, public order was to be maintained by a lightly armed “Peace Preservation Corps”. Per the terms of the Tanggu Truce, any disputes that could not be resolved by the Peace Preservation Corps would be settled by agreement through direct discussions between the Japanese and Chinese governments.

A secret clause of the Tanggu Truce excluded any of the Anti-Japanese Volunteer Armies from the Peace Preservation Corps. This effectively meant that the Japanese Army was able to dominate the Peace Preservation Corp with demobilized troops from the collaborationist proxy Chinese armies which had participated in the Battle of Rehe and the subsequent attack on the Great Wall and the intrusion into Hebei. Some 1,000 men were recruited into the Corps from the former troops of warlord Shi Yousan and a further 2,000 men from the forces of Li Jizhun.

At the end of 1935, with the proclamation of the Autonomous Government of Eastern Hebei, the Peace Preservation Corps was disbanded, and its forces were absorbed into the new East Hebei Army.

== Sources ==
- Jowett, Phillip S., Rays of The Rising Sun, Armed Forces of Japan's Asian Allies 1931–45, Volume I: China & Manchuria, 2004. Helion & Co. Ltd., 26 Willow Rd., Solihull, West Midlands, England.
- International Military Tribunal for the Far East, Chapter 5: Japanese Aggression Against China
- Fenby, Jonathan (2003). Chiang Kai-shek: China's Generalissimo and the Nation He Lost. Carroll & Graf Publishers. ISBN 0-7867-1318-6.
