= Tongzhou mutiny =

1937 attempted rebellion in China

Coordinates: 39°48′N 116°48′E

- Part of the Battle of Beiping–Tianjin and the Second Sino-Japanese War
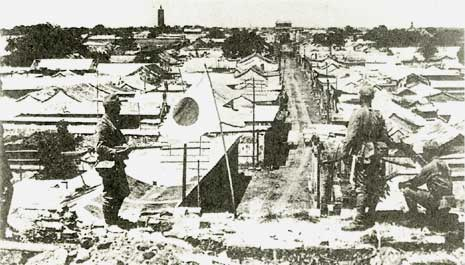
- Japanese soldiers on the walls of Tongzhou during the Tungchow Mutiny, 1937
Date	29 July 1937
Location	Tongzhou, Beijing, China
Result	Japanese victory

Belligerents
Empire of Japan	East Hebei Autonomous Government

Commanders and leaders
(Japan) Kanichiro Tashiro (Japan) Shin'ichi Fujii (Japan) Hosoki Shigeru †	Zhang Yantian; Zhang Qingyu

Strength
1,700	9,000

Casualties and losses
Unknown	Unknown
- Around 260 Japanese and Korean civilians killed

The Tongzhou mutiny (Chinese and Japanese: 通州事件; pinyin: Tōngzhōu Shìjiàn; Wade–Giles: Tungchow Shihchien; rōmaji: Tsūshū jiken), sometimes referred to as the Tongzhou massacre, was an assault on Japanese civilians and troops by the security forces of East Hebei Autonomous Government in Tongzhou, China, on 29 July 1937, shortly after the Marco Polo Bridge incident, which triggered the outbreak of Second Sino-Japanese War. Approximately 260 Japanese and Korean residents were brutally killed in the assault. This event escalated tensions between China and Japan, contributing to the further deterioration of relations following the Marco Polo Bridge incident.

== Background ==
Tongzhou was the capital of Tongxian (now the northern part of Tongzhou District, Beijing) and was located about 30 km east of Beiping (now Beijing). As a result of the Japanese operation to divide the five provinces of North China for political purposes, Tongzhou became the capital of the East Hebei Anti-Communist Autonomous Government, established by Yin Ju-keng, who declared autonomy from the Kuomintang government in Nanjing.

At the time, the main force of the Japanese army defending Tongzhou had been deployed, and only a small unit with poor combat capabilities remained in Tongzhou. The Japanese army considered the East Hebei Autonomous Government's security forces defending Tongzhou to be friendly forces, so the attack was an unexpected event.

There are various theories about the reason for the incident.

On July 7, three weeks before the Tongzhou Incident, the Marco Polo Bridge incident broke out, in which Song Zheyuan's 29th Army clashed with the Japanese garrison in China.

Originally, the Tanggu Agreement of May 1933 established a demilitarized zone to avoid military conflict between Japan and China, prohibiting both sides from entering, and the Chinese police force was to maintain public order. For this reason, the security force was mainly made up of Han Chinese and horse bandits who had fled from Manchuria to avoid the Japanese army, and these were commonly called "miscellaneous troops."

The East Hebei Anti-Communist Autonomous Government was established as a result of Japan's efforts to separate North China, which was still seeking to expand its influence in the region.[8] Led by Yin Ju-keng, a pro-Japanese graduate of Waseda University, the Self-Government Declaration was announced in Tongzhou on November 25, 1935, and in December the autonomous government began to operate, with two autonomous government security forces established. In opposition to the East Hebei Autonomous Government, the Kuomintang government established the East Hebei Administrative Affairs Committee (Jidong Government) (chairman: Song Zheyuan).

The East Hebei Anti-Communist Autonomous Government's Security Forces were a security force that was trained by soldiers dispatched from the Japanese Army's China Garrison, and were made up of the Training Corps and five General Corps, the First, Second, Third, and Fourth. In reality, they were paramilitary organizations, but in principle they were called the Security Forces, as an organization for maintaining public order. Although some of the aforementioned "miscellaneous forces" still had strong anti-Japanese sentiments, many of them were employed as part of the Security Forces in order to avoid conflict with them. Within Tongzhou city, one division of the First Security Forces General Division (Commander: Zhang Qingyu) and one division of the Training General Division (Commander: Yin Ju-Keng, Deputy Commander: Zhang Qingyu) were stationed, while one division of the Second Security Forces General Division (Commander: Zhang Yantian) was stationed outside the city. The Second Division of the First Security Forces General Division was also equipped with heavy machine guns and field artillery. However, the unit was formed from part of the former Northeast Army (Chinese version), and anti-Japanese sentiment was by no means favorable, and some of the troops were cadres with strong anti-Japanese sentiment, anti-Japanese units, and bandits.[12][15] At around 7 p.m. on November 20, 1936, about 400 men from the 5th and 6th companies of the Changli Security Force stopped their locomotives on the Beining Railway between Tongzhi and Kaiping, and abducted Major Furuta Ryuzo, commander of the Shanhaiguan garrison, Captain Matsuo Shinichi, commander of the Luanxian garrison, Captain Nagamatsu Kyoichi, medical doctor Katagi Eikyu, and Kazue Kusumi, along with 10 other Japanese passengers.[16][17] The rebellion was put down, but Major Furuta took responsibility and committed seppuku.[16][18]

In Tongzhou, like the Western powers, Japanese troops were stationed for the purpose of protecting Japanese residents, based on the Beijing Protocol following the Boxer Rebellion. This Tongzhou unit was originally intended to be stationed in Tongzhou, but Vice Minister of the Army Umezu Yoshijiro strongly opposed it, stating that stationing in Tongzhou, far from the Beijing-Tianjin Line, was not permitted under the spirit of the Beijing Protocol. Instead, the unit was stationed in Fengtai, southwest of Beiping.[19] At the time of the Marco Polo Bridge incident, about 45 members of a platoon (platoon leader: Lieutenant Fujio Shinichi) of the China Garrison Infantry First Battalion and seven members of the Tongzhou Military Police were stationed in Tongzhou, and on the night of July 18, the China Garrison Infantry Second Regiment (regiment commander: Lieutenant Colonel Kayashima Takashi) arrived from Tianjin and stayed at Tongzhou Normal School.[20] According to the "Development of Operational Plans for the China Garrison Army" dated July 15, 1937, supply bases were established in Tongzhou and Fengtai in preparation for the "First Phase of the Clean-up Campaign" [note 1], and it was assumed that the combat command post would advance to Tongzhou or Fengtai between battles [note 2].

At the time of the Tongzhou Incident, the main force of the Japanese Second Regiment, which was defending Tongzhou, was deployed to Nanyuan, south of Beijing, and there were only personnel in Tongzhou who were not combat-capable [8]. Japan considered the Jidong Anti-Communist Autonomous Government Security Force to be a friendly force [8].

== Causes ==
There are several views as to the cause of the mutiny of the East Hebei Army.

- Revenge against Japan for the aforementioned bombing.
- Propaganda radio broadcasts by the Kuomintang which made them believe that the KMT had won at the Marco Polo Bridge.
- The conclusion of a secret agreement between the KMT and the East Hebei Government.
- Indignation at the flood of opium drugs countenanced by the East Hebei Government.

== Aftermath ==
In addition to Japanese military personnel, approximately 260 non-Chinese civilians living in Tongzhou in accordance with the Boxer Protocol of 1901 were killed in the uprising. An American journalist who visited the site reported that 117 Japanese and 106 Korean civilians were killed; Chiang Kai-shek's private diaries (published in the 1970s) recorded 104 Japanese and 108 Korean casualties. Approximately 60 foreign civilians survived and they provided both journalists and later historians with firsthand witness accounts. The Chinese set fire to and destroyed much of the city.

Anti-Chinese sentiments were further intensified in Japan. The popular Japanese slogan in those days was "To punish China the outrageous", Japanese: 暴戻支那膺懲, romanized: Bōrei Shina Yōchō or its shorter version Japanese: 暴支膺懲, romanized: Bō Shi Yōchō. The Japanese military adventurists stationed in China used this incident to justify further military operations under the pretext of protecting Japanese lives and properties in and around Beijing. After World War II the Japanese defense team at the International Military Tribunal for the Far East (the Tokyo War Crimes Tribunal) submitted the official statement made in 1937 by the Ministry of Foreign Affairs of Japan as the inevitable cause of the Sino-Japanese conflicts, but presiding judge Sir William Webb KBE rejected it as evidence.

== Gallery ==
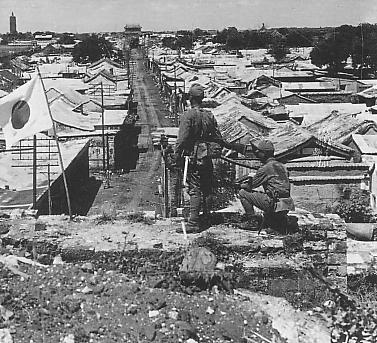
Japanese soldiers on walls of Tongzhou

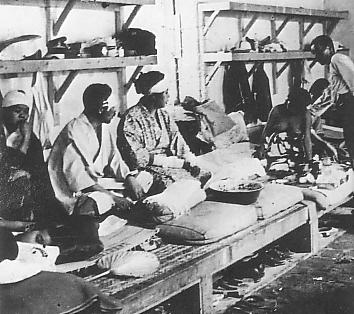
Japanese survivors of the Tongzhou Mutiny

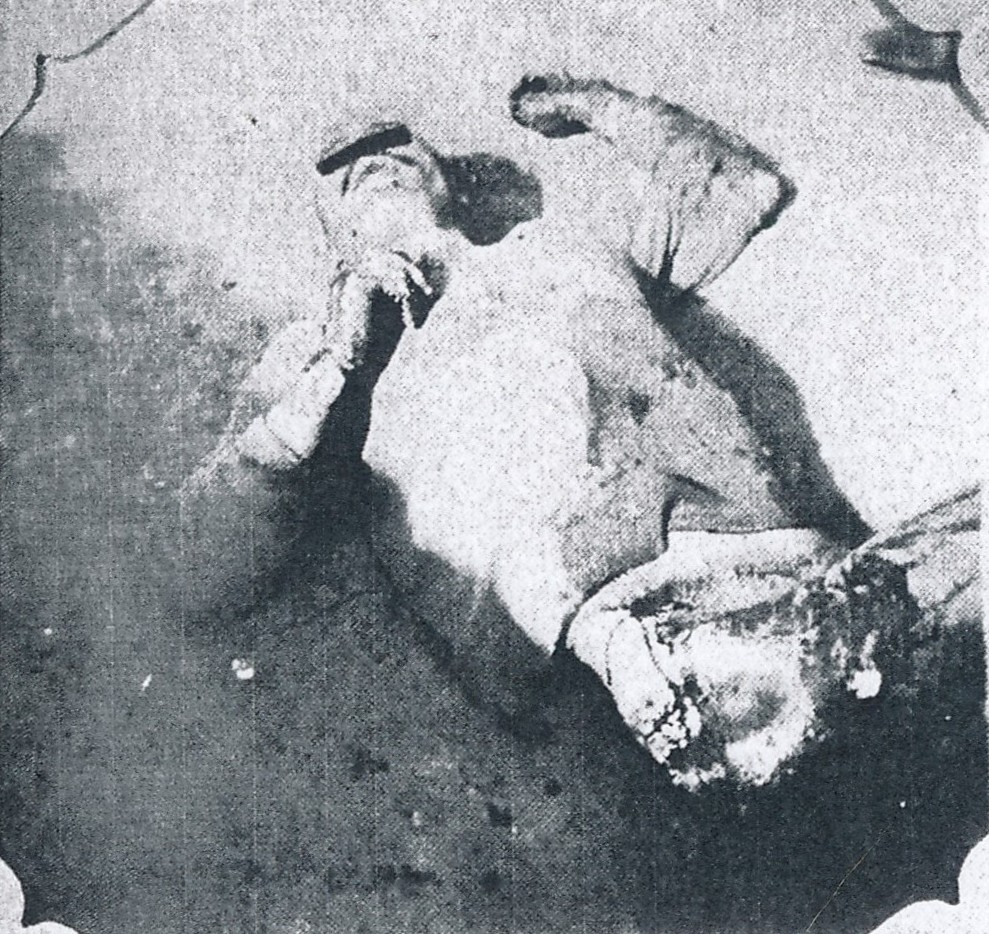
Victims of Tongzhou Mutiny

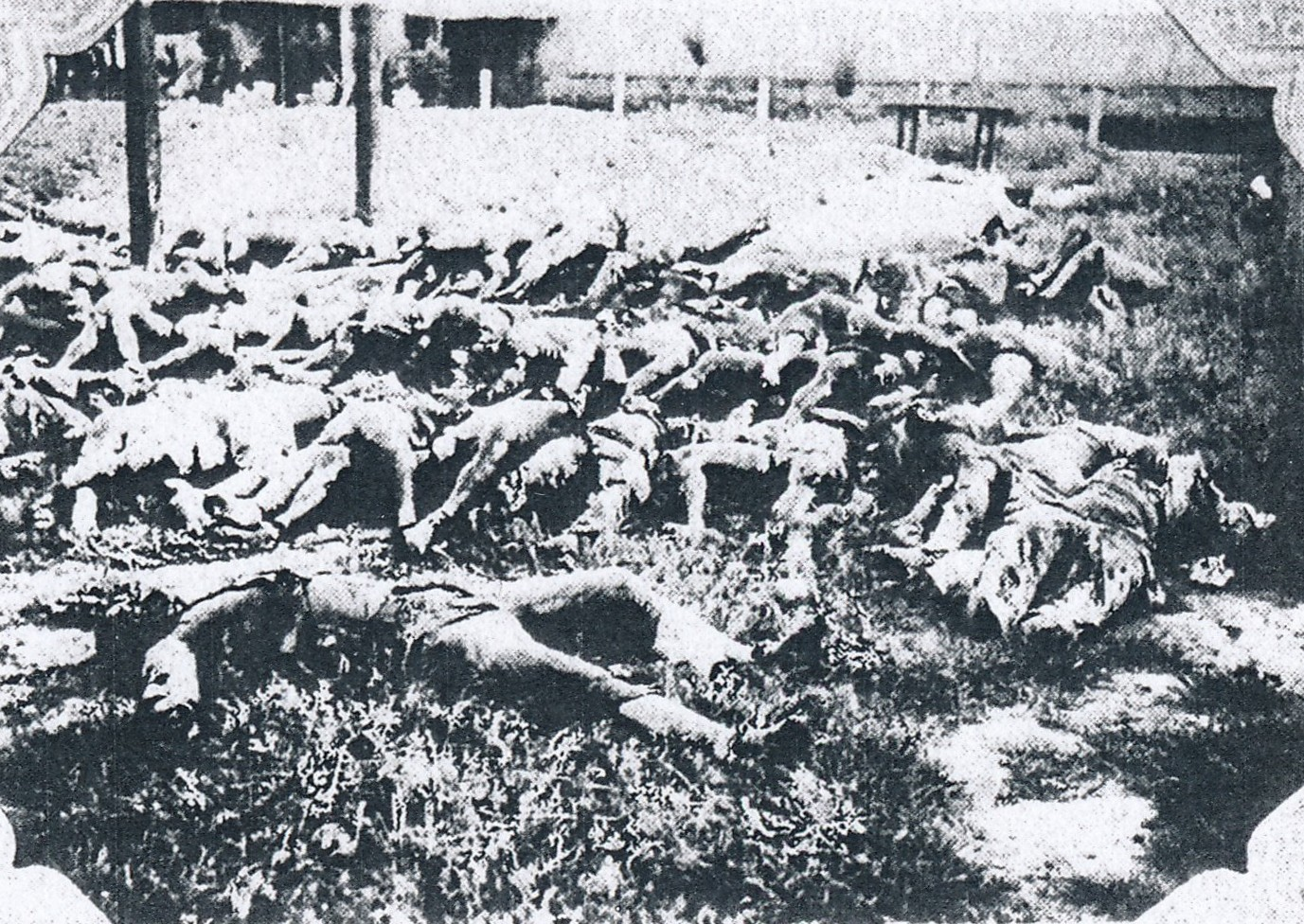
Victims of Tongzhou Mutiny

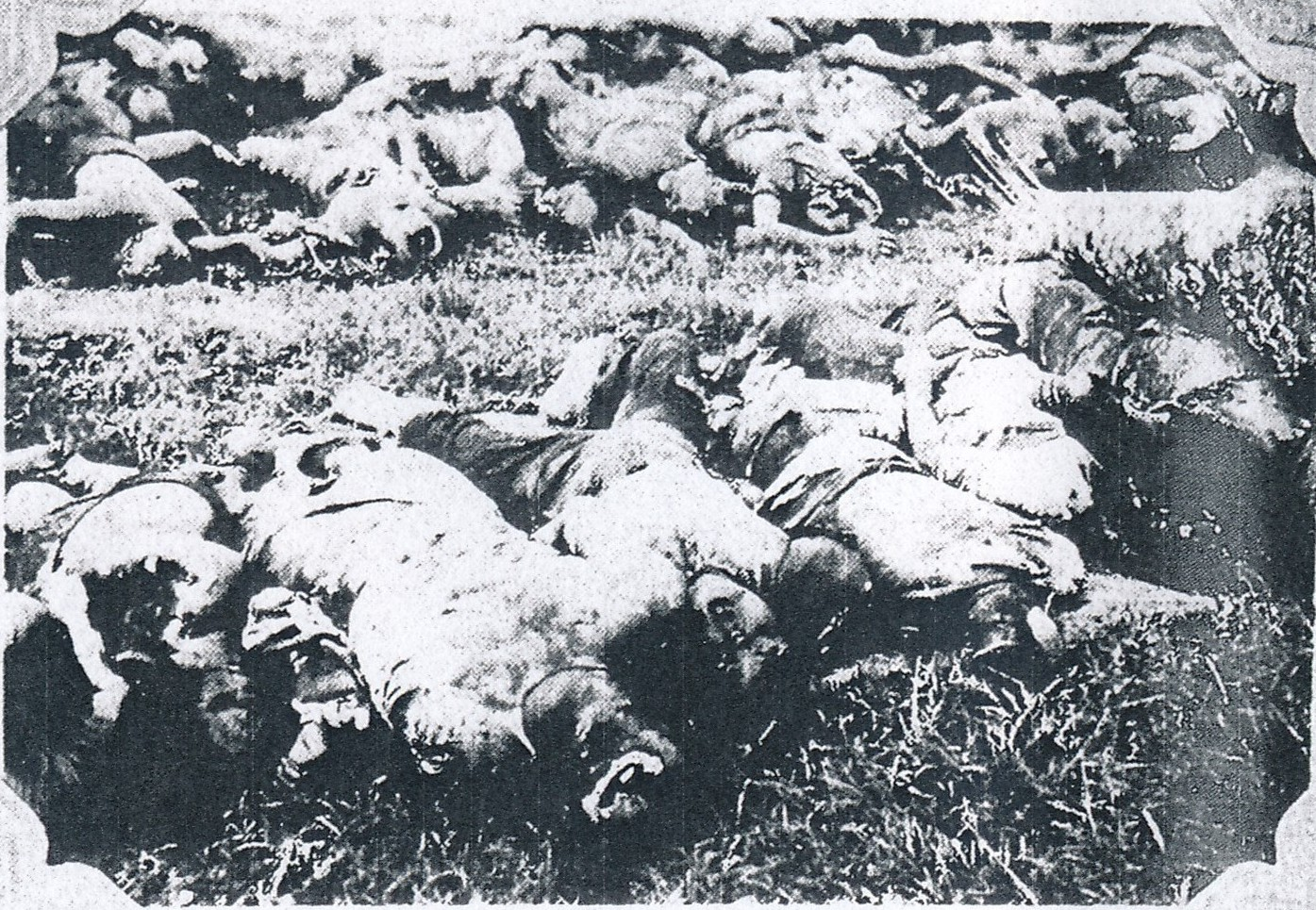
Victims of Tongzhou Muntiny

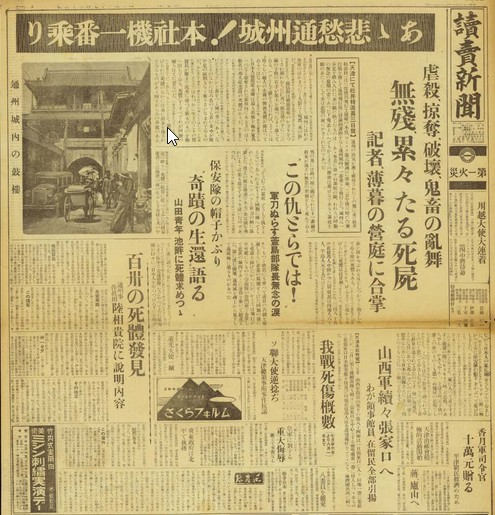
Newspaper Yomiuri Shimbun reporting on the incidents

== See also ==
- Bloody Sunday, an analogous massacre in Europe during World War II.
- Second Sino-Japanese War
- Nikolayevsk incident
- Nanking incident of 1927
- Tonghua incident
- Jinan incident
