= Tong Linge =

Chinese general (1892–1937)

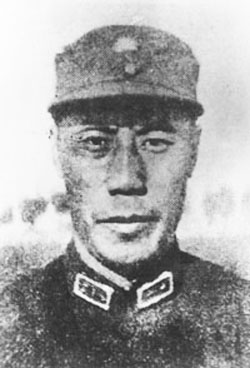
Tong Linge

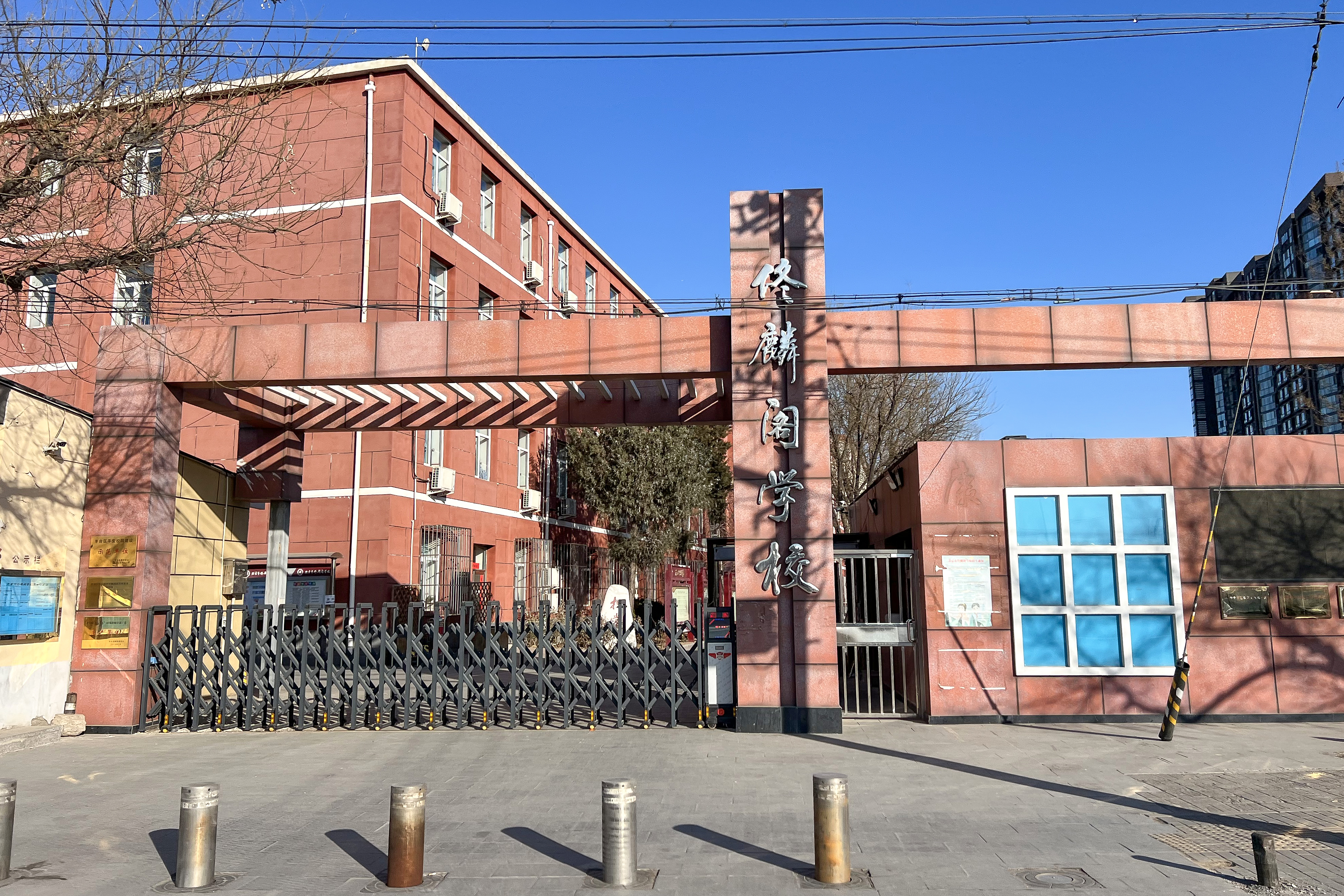
Tong Lin'ge School in Dahongmen Subdistrict, Beijing, honoring the general

Tong Linge (traditional Chinese: 佟麟閣; simplified Chinese: 佟麟阁; pinyin: Tóng Língé; Wade–Giles: Tung Lin-keh; 29 October 1892 – 28 July 1937) was a Chinese National Revolutionary Army officer who was the deputy commander of the 29th Army during the Marco Polo Bridge Incident and Battle of Beiping–Tianjin during the early stages of the Second Sino-Japanese War.

== Biography ==
Of Manchu descent, Tong was born in Gaoyang County, Zhili in 1892. A soldier of the Guominjun, he was recruited by Ji Hongchang to command the 1st Corps of the Chahar People's Anti-Japanese Army. After the Nationalist government suppressed the anti-Japanese forces operating in China in the early 1930s, he joined Song Zheyuan's 29th Army in 1933. Eventually he became deputy commander of 29th Army. He was killed along with Zhao Dengyu in the fighting around Nanyuan during the Battle of Beiping–Tianjin. The Nationalist government later posthumously promoted him to general.
