= East Hebei Army =

Military force of the Autonomous Government of Eastern Hebei

The East Hebei Army was raised from the former soldiers of the Peace Preservation Corps that had been created by the Tangku Truce of 31 May 1933. The Demilitarized Zone Peace Preservation Corps had been the "neutral" force policing the demilitarized area south of the Great Wall when Yin Ju-keng, at the instigation of the Japanese, proclaimed an Autonomous Government of Eastern Hebei in November 1935, with its capital at Tongzhou.

The Peace Preservation Corps was disbanded and absorbed by the East Hebei Army and was trained by Japanese advisors, officers from the Kwantung Army, who drilled the men by day and gave them anti-communist lectures by night. The Japanese officers had final say in all matters pertaining to the army. Trained for a year, the Japanese believed they had created a reliable and well trained force. Intended for local policing they were only equipped with rifles and sidearms, and had no machine guns or artillery.

== Organization ==
The East Hebei Army had four Corps divided into three Brigades each and a Training Corps. Each brigade (called "Divisions") was divided into three sub-brigades; each sub-brigade had an attached Japanese Advisor. Strength and organization July, 1937:

- East Hebei Army – Yin Ju-keng
  - 1st Corps "Tongzhou" – Zhang Jingyu, 4,000 men
  - 2nd Corps "Conghua" – Chang Yen-tien, 4,000 men
  - 3rd Corps "Tongzhou" – Li Yensheng, 4,000 men
  - 4th Corps "Conghua" – Han Zexi, 4,000 men
  - Training Corps "Tongzhou" – Yin Ju-keng, 2,000 men

== Operations ==
In December 1935, 4th Detachment of the East Hebei Army attacked the Nationalist held towns of Taku and the port of Tanggu. Forces from the 32nd Army killed two of the East Hebei soldiers and the rest retreated. Threats were made by the Japanese and the 32nd Army was withdrawn. The East Hebei Army then occupied the two towns. In July 1937, they were involved in the Marco Polo Bridge Incident and Battle of Beiping-Tianjin until they revolted in the Tongzhou mutiny on the morning of 29 July 1937. After the mutiny was put down by the Japanese, the East Hebei Army was dissolved, as was the Autonomous Government.

== See also ==
- Battle of Beiping–Tianjin

== Sources ==
- Jowett, Phillip S., Rays of The Rising Sun, Armed Forces of Japan’s Asian Allies 1931–45, Volume I: China & Manchuria, 2004. Helion & Co. Ltd., Solihull, West Midlands, England.
- Hsu Long-hsuen and Chang Ming-kai, History of The Sino-Japanese War (1937–1945) 2nd ed., 1971. Translated by Wen Ha-hsiung, Chung Wu Publishing; Taipei, Taiwan Republic of China.
