= Zhao Dengyu =

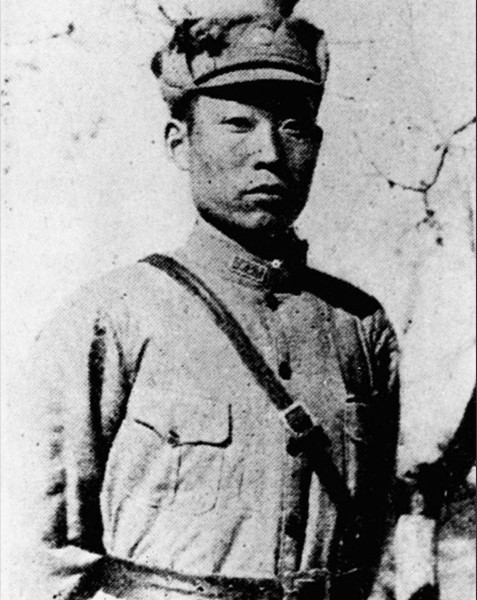
Zhao Dengyu

Zhao Dengyu (traditional Chinese: 趙登禹; simplified Chinese: 赵登禹; pinyin: Zhào Dēngyǔ; Wade–Giles: Chao Teng-yu; 16 May 1898 - 28 July 1937) was a Chinese National Revolutionary Army general who served at the beginning of the Second Sino-Japanese War. He first served against the Japanese during the 1933 Defense of the Great Wall and was killed in action during the Battle of Beiping–Tianjin in July 1937.

== Biography ==
Zhao was born in a peasant family in Heze, Shandong in 1898. He joined Feng Yuxiang's Guominjun in 1914. After 1922, he distinguished himself on the battlefield and rose through ranks and became a division commander. In 1930, he was transferred to be the commander of the 109th Brigade, 37th Division, 29th Army.

On 8 March 1933 during the Defense of the Great Wall, he was ordered to relieve the troops stationed at the Xifengkou Pass on the Great Wall. On the 10th, he led his troops to launch a night surprise attack on the bivouac of the Japanese troops, in which his troops annihilated hundreds of the Japanese troops, captured over 10 machineguns and burned over 10 Japanese supply-carrying vehicles. On the 11th, the 109th Brigade was ordered to take a devious route to attack the rear area of the Japanese troops. In this battle, the Chinese killed 3000 Japanese troops and destroyed 18 enemy artillery pieces. After the battles at the Great Wall, he was promoted to be commander of the 132nd Division, the 29th Army and led his troops to garrison Chahar.

On 27 July 1937, during the Battle of Beiping–Tianjin, Zhao led an advance regiment to the headquarters of the 29th Army in Nanyuan, Beiping. On the morning of the 28th, the main force of the Japanese troops launched attack against Nanyuan under the fire support of dozens of fighter planes. Together with Tong Linge, deputy commander of the 29th Army, Zhao directed the troops stationed in Nanyuan to resist the Japanese troops. In this battle his right arm and leg were wounded, yet he still remained at the frontline to command his troops in fight. Later that day, he was ordered to lead his troops to assemble at Dahongmen, to prepare for a counterattack. However, on the way to Dahongmen to the south of the city, he was mortally wounded in the chest during a Japanese ambush. On 31 July, the Nationalist government posthumously promoted him to the rank of general.
