= Battle of Rehe =

Part of the Inner Mongolian campaign (1933)

- Part of the Defense of the Great Wall in the Second Sino-Japanese War and the interwar period
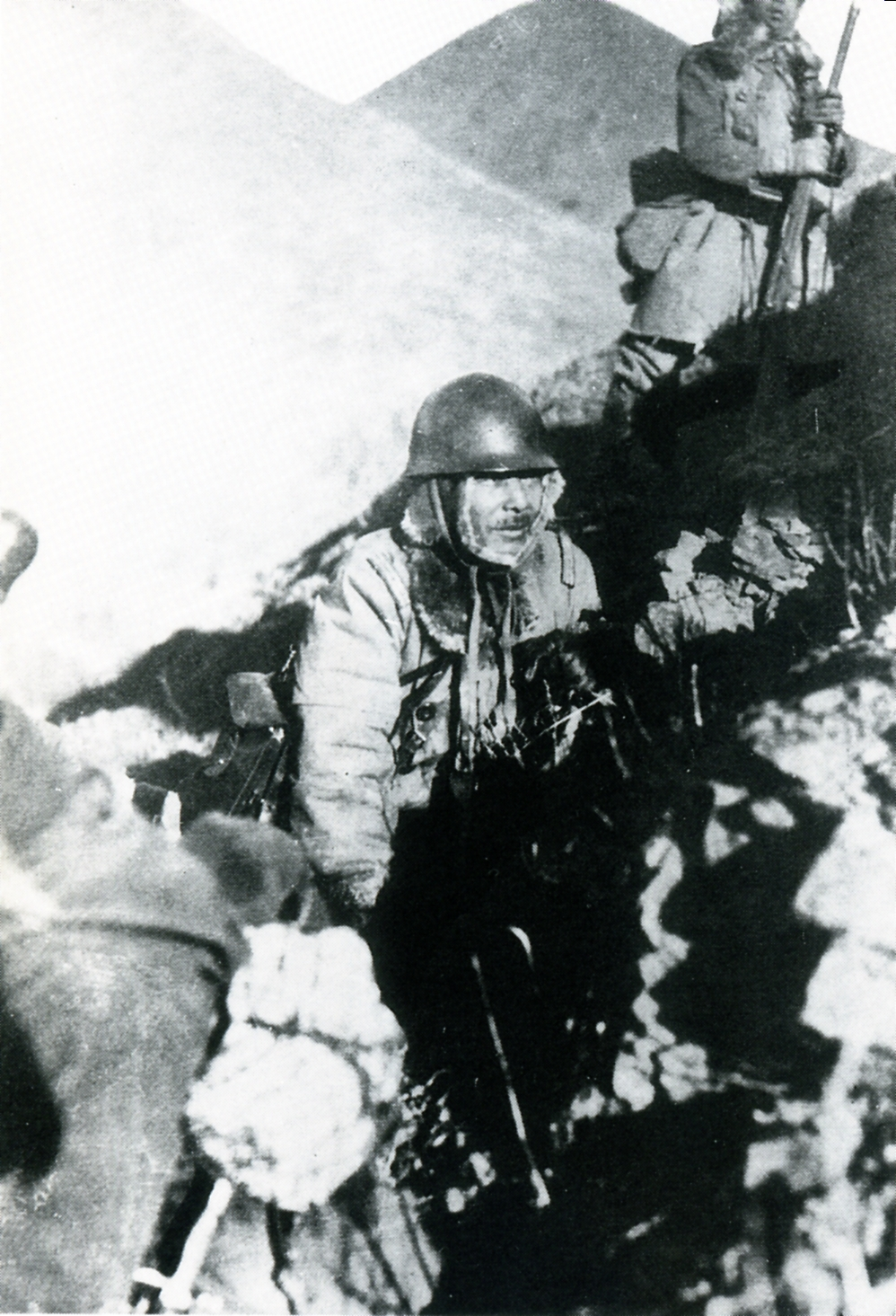
- 32nd Infantry Regiment Commander Tanaka Seiichi and his troops capturing Gubeikou Pass on the Great Wall.
Date	February 21 – March 1, 1933 (1 week and 1 day)
Location	Jehol Province, Manchuria region, Republic of China
Result	Japanese-Manchukuo victory
Territorial changes	Rehe Province got annexed on the 4 March 1933

Belligerents
China	Empire of Japan; Manchukuo; (Republic of China (1912–1949)) National Salvation Army

Commanders and leaders
(Republic of China (1912–1949)) Tang Yulin (Republic of China (1912–1949)) Sun Dianying	(Empire of Japan) Nobuyoshi Muto (Manchukuo) Zhang Haipeng (Republic of China (1912–1949)) Li Jizhun

Strength
100,000–150,000 regular troops	100,000

Casualties and losses
Battle of Rehe: 161 officers and 5,051 soldiers killed 368 officers and 4,894 soldiers wounded	171 combat deaths

The Battle of Rehe (simplified Chinese: 热河战役; traditional Chinese: 熱河戰役; pinyin: Rèhé zhànyì, sometimes called the Battle of Jehol) was the second part of Operation Nekka, a campaign by which the Empire of Japan successfully captured the Inner Mongolian province of Rehe from the Chinese warlord Zhang Xueliang and annexed it to the new state of Manchukuo. The battle was fought from February 21 to March 1, 1933.

== Background ==
Following the establishment of Manchukuo, the Kwantung Army launched an operation to secure its southern frontier with China by attacking and capturing Shanhaiguan Pass at the Great Wall on 3 January 1933. The province of Rehe, on the northern side of the Great Wall, was the next target. Declaring the province to be historically a portion of Manchuria, the Japanese Army initially hoped to secure it through the defection of General Tang Yulin to the Manchukuo cause. When this failed, the military option was placed into action. Assigned to this operation were the Japanese 6th Division and 8th Division and 14th and 33rd Mixed Brigades of infantry, 4th Cavalry Brigade with Type 92 Heavy Armored Cars, and the 1st Special Tank Company.

The Japanese army's chief of staff requested emperor Hirohito's sanction for the "strategic operation" against Chinese forces in Rehe. Hoping that it was the last of the army's operations in the area and that it would bring an end to the Manchurian matter, the Emperor approved, while stating explicitly that the army was not to go beyond China's Great Wall.

The Chinese armies gathered to defend Rehe numbered between 100,000 and 150,000 with 40,000 of the Northeastern army under Wan Fulin, 30,000–50,000 under Tang Yulin and 30,000 former Guominjun under Sun Dianying and Song Zheyuan.

Irregular forces included village militias, Manchurian bandits in exile and 5 volunteer brigades under Zhu Qinglan, though these volunteers rather than aiding the defense hindered it and Zhang Xueliang issued warrants for the arrest of the volunteers.

== The battle ==
On February 23, 1933, the offensive was launched. On February 25 Chaoyang and Kailu were taken. On March 2 the Japanese 4th Cavalry Brigade encountered resistance from the forces of Sun Dianying, and after days of fighting took over Chifeng. Sun Dianying mounted a counterattack against the Japanese 6th Division on the same day, and at one time penetrated to near the Japanese headquarters. On March 4 Japanese cavalry and the 1st Special Tank Company with Type 89 tanks took Chengde, the capital of Rehe.

== Aftermath ==
Rehe was subsequently annexed to Manchukuo. Zhang Xueliang was forced by the Kuomintang government to relinquish his posts for "medical reasons". Chinese forces fell back in disarray to the Great Wall, where after a series of battles and skirmishes, the Japanese Army seized a number of strategic points, and then agreed to a ceasefire and a negotiated settlement (the Tanggu Truce) whereby a demilitarized zone would be established between the Great Wall and Beijing. However, this would prove to be only a temporary respite before the full-scale combat of the Second Sino-Japanese War erupted in earnest in 1937.

== See also ==
- Operation Jehol order of battle
- Defense of the Great Wall
