= Hebei–Chahar Political Council =

Chinese political body (1935–37)

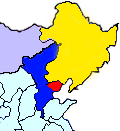
Map showing the territory of the Hebei–Chahar Political Council in blue

The Hebei–Chahar (or Hopeh-Chahar) Political Council, or Hebei-Chahar Political Commission (Chinese: 冀察政務委員會; pinyin: Jìchá zhèngwù wěiyuánhuì; Wade–Giles: Chi-ch'a chêng-wu wei-yüan-hui), was a political body established under General Song Zheyuan on 18 December 1935 to rule over the two northern Chinese provinces of Hebei and Chahar.

During mid-1933, the Kuomintang government in Nanjing sought to strengthen control over the northern provinces of Hebei and Chahar, then under the control of Song's 29th Army. As such, He Yingqin replaced Zhang Xueliang as head of the Beiping Branch Military Council and Huang Fu installed as head of the new Political Affairs Commission, both men being Kuomintang officials loyal to Nanjing. Their impact, however, was limited, and any improvement of relations between the 29th Army and the central government came from personal relationships, such as that between Song and Liu Jianqun, political education officer in the 29th Army.

== Withdrawal of the Kuomintang ==
In 1935, the Chief of Staff of the Japanese China Garrison Army, Colonel Sakai Takashi, demanded the withdrawal of all Nationalist influence from Hebei and the removal of the pro-Nationalist governor of Hebei, Yu Xuezhong. The government in Tokyo, worried about a repeat of the Mukden Incident, despatched naval support units to Tianjin to create the impression of a well-coordinated Japanese advance. After this, the government in Nanjing signed the He-Umezu Agreement, which forbade the Kuomintang from conducting any party operations in Hebei, thus obliging the removal of all central government influence from the PAC and BMC, and both He and Huang returned to the capital. Song meanwhile took control of Hebei in Yu Xuezhong's place, increasing his territory without increasing his military strength, and consequently making the 29th Army less able to resist Japanese military pressure. In May of the same year, the Qin-Doihara Agreement was signed, removing Song as governor of Chahar and essentially removing all KMT influence there. By the end of 1935, the Chinese central government had virtually vacated from North China.

== North China Autonomy Movement ==
After the Qin-Doihara Agreement was signed, the Japanese, under the direction of Doihara Kenji began a movement to promote autonomy for the five northern provinces of Hebei, Chahar, Shanxi, Shandong and Suiyuan. Riots were staged on Doihara's behalf in Xiangxian (modern-day Xiangcheng), and a Manchukuo-style "state founding conference" was organised. Retired politicians from the Beiyang government such as Cao Kun, Wu Peifu (formerly of the Zhili clique) and Duan Qirui (formerly of the Anhui clique) were also targeted to serve as potential leaders, and by late autumn the autonomy movement had begun amassing the semblance of a popular base in Beiping (present-day Beijing), Tianjin and rural Hebei. However, the "state founding conference" proved a failure, with none of the warlords of North China attending. As a face-saving measure, the Kwantung Army created the East Hebei Autonomous Council in November.

== Negotiations between Song and Japan ==
Doihara then diverted most of his overtures towards General Song, hoping to convince him to set up an autonomous government in the Hebei-Chahar region. The latter initially vehemently denied any personal involvement in Japanese plans for the region, and it was only on 19 November 1935, after Doihara presented Song with an ultimatum to declare autonomy or face military reprisal that did he admit to being the target of Japanese overtures, telling Chiang Kai-shek that:

We have had no choice but to begin exploratory discussions with [the Japanese], while supporting the centralized system and remaining within the following limits: non-intervention in China’s domestic politics, non-infringement of China’s territory, equality and mutual amity....

— Song Zheyuan

In December 1935, seeking to re-establish control over the northern provinces, Nanjing resolved to dissolve the BMC, establishing the Hebei–Chahar Political Council in its place, which reported directly to Wang Jingwei's Executive Yuan; whilst in January of the next year, Chiang Kai-shek ordered the withdrawal of Shang Zhen out of Hebei, allowing Song complete control of the province in exchange for his loyalty to Nanjing. Nonetheless, discussions with the Japanese continued: in spring 1936, the North China Garrison Army proposed joint political and military action to "prevent the spread of communism" in the region, with an agreement reportedly concluded by 30 March. On 1 October, a preliminary agreement was concluded between Song and Tashiro Kanichirō regarding joint Sino-Japanese economic development of the region, but the talks were suspended after the government in Nanjing made clear that no such agreement would be considered valid without its approval. During the latter part of 1936 and early 1937, however, Song moved back towards realignment with Nanjing, supporting Chiang Kai-shek during the Xi'an Incident.

After the fall of Beiping, Song resigned as Chairman of the Hebei–Chahar Political Council, but it was refused, and he remained in post until the council was officially dissolved on 20 August 1937.

== See also ==
- Second Sino-Japanese War
- Actions in Inner Mongolia (1933-36)
- Jia Deyao
- History of Beijing
