= Guang'anmen =

City gate in Beijing, China

Coordinates: 39°53′22″N 116°21′00″E

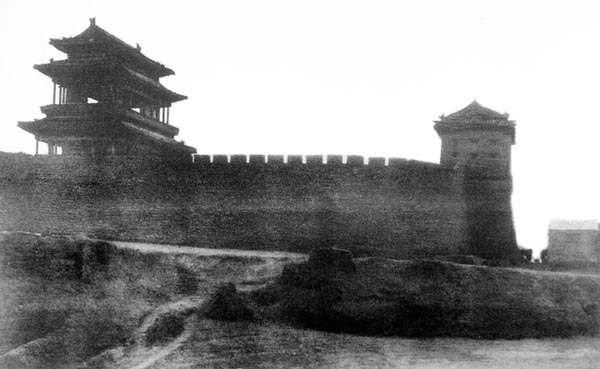
- Guang'anmen in 1910

Chinese name
- Traditional Chinese: 廣安門
- Simplified Chinese: 广安门
- Literal meaning: Gate of Expansive Peace
Transcriptions
Standard Mandarin
- Hanyu Pinyin: Guǎng'ānmén
- Wade–Giles: Kuang-an-mên

Manchu name
- Manchu script: ᡝᡳᡨᡝᠨ ᠪᡝ ᡝᠯᡥᡝ ᠣᠪᡠᡵᡝ ᡩᡠᡴᠠ
- Möllendorff: Eiten Be Elhe Obure Duka

Other names

Guangningmen
- Traditional Chinese: 廣寧門
- Simplified Chinese: 广宁门
- Literal meaning: Gate of Expansive Peace
Transcriptions
Standard Mandarin
- Hanyu Pinyin: Guǎngníngmén
- Wade–Giles: Kuang-ning-mên

Zhangyimen
- Traditional Chinese: 張儀門
- Simplified Chinese: 张仪门
Transcriptions
Standard Mandarin
- Hanyu Pinyin: Zhāngyímén
- Wade–Giles: Chang-i-mên

Zhangyimen
- Traditional Chinese: 彰儀門
- Simplified Chinese: 彰仪门
Transcriptions
Standard Mandarin
- Hanyu Pinyin: Zhāngyímén
- Wade–Giles: Chang-i-mên

Beijing City Walls

Guang'anmen, also known as the Gate of Expansive Peace, Guangningmen and Zhangyimen, was a city gate of old Beijing, constructed during the reign of the Jiajing Emperor (1521–1567) of the Ming Dynasty. This gate was part of Beijing's city wall, situated south-west of the city center and facing east. Guang'anmen served as a main entrance to Beijing.

== History ==
The Records of the Capital at Yan (《燕京记》), written by the Qing historian Gu Sen (顾森), read: "Of the seven outer city gates, the one facing east is called Guangningmen. 15 li to the west of the gate is Lugou Bridge; if you cross the bridge and continue 20 lis, you will find the seat of Liangxiang County. The gate is a strategic passage for ground traffic from the southern provinces and is of vital importance." (Note: Chinese: 外城七门，面向西者广宁门，西行三十里卢沟桥，过桥四十里即是良乡县，为各省陆路进京之咽喉.)

The Guanganmen Incident of 26 July 1937 was part of the Second Sino-Japanese War, the Chinese theatre of World War II. This ultimately resulted in the retreat of Chinese armies to the southern provinces, the fall of Beijing and Tianjing, and the Japanese occupation of the entire North China Plain later that year.

The gate was torn down for construction of Beijing's 2nd Ring Road, which led to the demolition of most of Beijing city fortifications. The original two-story tower with double eaves was 17.6 m (58 ft) tall, 13.8 m (45 ft) long and 6 m (20 ft) wide. The tower and the wall combined had a height of 26 m (85 ft).

== Etymology ==
Guang'anmen was known as "Guangningmen" during the Ming and early Qing Dynasty. It was renamed by the Daoguang Emperor, whose private name was Minning. Because the Chinese naming taboo forbid the use of characters in the given name of ancestors and emperors, the name was changed to a close synonym.

== Neighbourhood ==
Guang'anmen is now the name of a Beijing neighbourhood in Xicheng District. After the completion of Guang'an Avenue (广安大街), one of the main traffic arteries of modern Beijing, the area has become an important business district. It is also home to a few prestigious education institutes, including Central Conservatory of Music, Beijing Primary School (北京小学) and Beijing No. 14 High School (北京十四中).

Line 7 of the Beijing Subway passes underneath Guang'an Avenue. The neighbourhood is also served by many public bus lines.

== See also ==
- Beijing city fortifications
- Xicheng District
