= Sun Sunquan =

Chinese activist and politician (1903–1965)

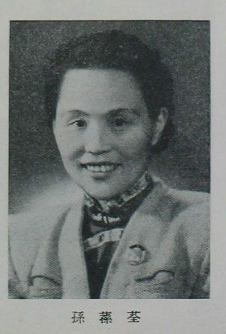
- Sun's portrait for the first plenary session of the Chinese People's Political Consultative Conference
- Born: 1903; Tongcheng, Anhui, Qing China
- Died: September 22, 1965 (aged 61–62); Beijing, People's Republic of China
- Education: Beijing Normal University
- Occupations: Activist, educator, politician
- Political party: Jiusan Society; China Democratic League
- Spouse: Tan Pingshan

Sun Sunquan
- Traditional Chinese: 孫蓀荃
- Simplified Chinese: 孙荪荃
Transcriptions
Standard Mandarin
- Hanyu Pinyin: Sūn Sūnquán

Sun Sunquan (Note: Simplified Chinese: 孙荪荃; traditional Chinese: 孫蓀荃; pinyin: Sūn Sūnquán, born Sun Xiangjie (Chinese: 祥偈; pinyin: Xiángjié). Some sources give her name as Sun Junquan.) (1903 – 1965) was a Chinese educator, activist, and politician. She headed Beijing No.1 School for Girls, participated in the December 9th Movement in 1935, and was a delegate to the first Chinese People's Political Consultative Conference in 1949. After the establishment of the People's Republic of China, she worked as a counsellor for the State Council until her death in 1965.

== Biography ==
=== Early life and education (1903–1935) ===
Sun was born in 1903. She was from Tongcheng, Anhui. Her original name was Xiangjie (Chinese: 祥偈; pinyin: Xiángjié). Sun's father, Sun Qiming, was a follower of Chen Duxiu in the New Culture Movement. In 1927, Sun graduated from Peking Normal University with a degree in the Chinese Language.

By 1933, Sun had become the president of Beijing No.1 School for Girls. In the same year, Sun published an article titled "If I were a woman" on Dagong Bao under the pen name of "Hebi" (Chinese: 何必; pinyin: Hé bì; lit. 'must it be necessarily so?'), asking the columnist Zhang Shenfu about his views on women. Her questions included:

What would you do if you were a woman? Would you condescend to marry someone who was not a match for your intelligence and wits? What is your opinion of such 'wild' and 'weird' women as Rosa Luxemburg?

— Sun Sunquan under the pen name of Hebi, "Jiashi wo shi nüzi de hua" (If I were a woman), Dagong bao (April 27, 1933)

Zhang wrote back, and the two met each other "a few months after the exchange". The two later had a love affair, which angered and humiliated Liu Qingyang, who married Zhang in 1921.

=== Activism during the Republic of China (1935–1949) ===
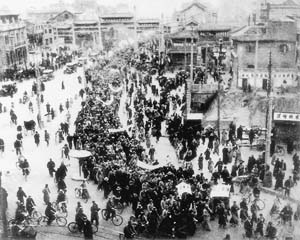
Sun was one of the commanders of the student demonstration during the December 9th Movement (pictured) in 1935.

Sun supported the establishment of the Beiping Students Union in 1935. The union was secretly headquartered in Beijing No.1 School for Girls, where Sun was the president. The union planned to demonstrate against the Kuomintang government on 9 December 1935, which became the December 9th Movement.

The night before the demonstration, Sun met with Fan Xiheng to plan how to open Fucheng Gate for the protesting students. They planned that Fan and Jacques Reclus, a French professor, would arrive at the gate, and Fan would ask the gate to be opened for Reclus. Then the protesting students would enter the city.

During the student demonstration, Sun was one of the commanders, along with Yao Yilin and Zhang Shenfu. Zhang recalled the role of Sun during the movement:

Sun and I were almost inseparable by then, and our love affair was almost as well known as our political association. She had played an important role in mobilizing students against the government for weeks before the massive demonstration of December 9.

— Zhang Shenfu

Sun was later demoted to a Chinese instructor at Beijing No.1 School for Girls. She broke up with Zhang in 1937. In 1942, she married Tan Pingshan in Chongqing.

In 1945, Sun participated in the organizing of the Union of the Three Principles of the People. From June 1946 to December 1948, Sun was a member of the board of directors of the Shanghai branch of the Jiusan Society. In 1946, she also participated in the founding of China Association for Promoting Democracy in Chongqing.

In 1947, she was one of the first members of the Symposium on the Japanese Question (Chinese: 对日问题座谈会) founded by Chu Fucheng, another director of the society. On 3 August 1947, the Symposium published a document "Our Opinion on the Japanese Question" on Dagong Bao, denouncing the U.S. support of Japan post WWII. Sun was one of the fifteen signatories of the document. She then sought signatures among women groups with Cao Mengjun.

=== Political career and death during the People's Republic of China (1949–1965) ===
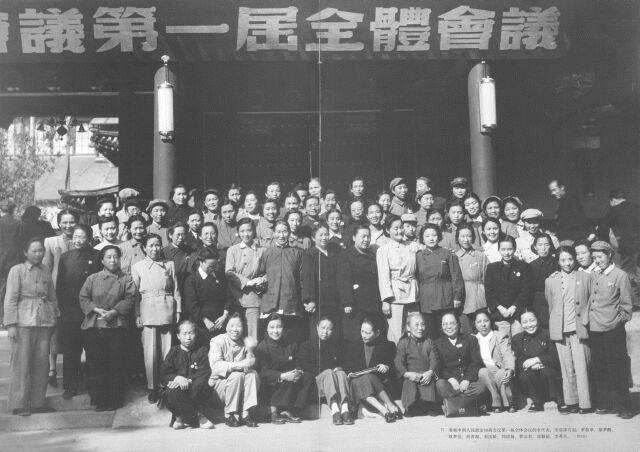
Sun was one of the women delegates (pictured) at the 1st Chinese People's Political Consultative Conference in 1949.

From December 1948 to March 1950, Sun was an alternate member of the supervisory of the Jiusan Society. She was a delegate at the 1st Chinese People's Political Consultative Conference in 1949. Then, from 1949 to 1954, Sun was a counsellor of the State Council. (Note: Chinese: 国务院参事, not to be confused with state councillor (Chinese: 国务委员), a higher position at the State Council of the People's Republic of China.) During this period, Sun observed the Land Reform Movement along with other counsellors. Around this time, when Fan Xiheng was arrested, Sun offered assistance to his family.

Sun was a delegate of the 2nd Chinese People's Political Consultative Conference from December 1954 to April 1959. At the time she became a delegate, she was the vice chair of the Committee of Women Groups of the Jiusan Society. She was also a member of the China Democratic League.

From 1959 to 1965, Sun became a counsellor again. She visited Yunnan with four other counsellors in January 1962, Hunan and Hubei in late 1963, and Daqing Oil Field in 1964, respectively.

Sun died on 22 September 1965 during the wave of Four Cleanups Movement. Miao Yan claimed that Sun committed suicide while naked. Zhang Shenfu also claimed that Sun committed suicide by hanging while naked, but he asserted that Sun died in the early 1950s.
