= Operation Nekka order of battle =

The Japanese and Manchukuoan order of battle for Operation Nekka was:

== Japan ==
Kwantung Army

Jehol Operation Force - Field Marshal Baron Nobuyoshi Muto,

- 6th Division (11th & 36th Infantry Brigades) - Lt. Gen. Sakamoto
- 8th Division (4th & 16th Infantry Brigades) - Lt. Gen. Nishi
- 14th Mixed Brigade / 7th Division - Major Gen. Hattori
- 33rd Mixed Brigade / 10th Division - Major Gen. Nakamura
- 4th Cavalry Brigade - Major Gen. Mogi
- 1st Special Tank Company - Captain Hyakutake
  - 11 x Type 89 Medium Tank
  - 2 x Type 92 Combat Cars

Manchukuo Imperial Army

Manchukuoan Force 42,000 men - Zhang Haipeng

Manchukuoan units with the Japanese Northern Column 10,000 men

- Taoliao Army - Zhang Haipeng (concurrent)
  - 7 Detachments( at least 2 are cavalry brigades)
- National Foundation Army (Manchukuo Preparatory 2nd Corps) - Zheng Guorui
  - 3 Detachments

Manchukuoan units with the Japanese Eastern Column 15,000 men

- National Protection Army (Fengtian Province Garrison Corps) - Yu Zhishan
- 1st Brigade of the Guard Corps (Manchukuo Imperial Guards) - Li Shoushan
- National Salvation Army (about 10,000 men) - Li Jizhun

== China ==
5th Army Group - Commander in chief Tang Yulin (governor of Rehe)

- 55th Army - Tang Yulin
  - 36th Division - Tang Yulin, at Beipiao,
  - 36th Cavalry Regiment - Shao Benliang, at Beipiao, Chaoyang, Zhuluke and Jianping. Shao defected to the Japanese.
  - 31st Brigade - ?, at Heishuizhen-Chifeng
  - Reserve Regiment - ?, at Pingquan-Chengde
  - 36th Artillery Regiment - ?, near Pingzhen
  - 1st Cavalry Brigade - ?, at Qinglianggou
  - 9th Cavalry Brigade - Cui Xingwu, at Kailu. Cui defected to the Japanese.
  - 10th Cavalry Brigade - ?, at Tianshan

6th Army Group - Zhang Zuoxiang (former governor of Jilin)*

- 41st Army - Sun Dianying
  - 117th Brigade - Ding Ting, at Haladaokou, east of Chifeng.
  - 118th Brigade - Liu Yueting, to the north of Chifeng
  - Reinforced 1st Brigade - Xing Yuchou, to the north of Chifeng
- Northeastern Loyal and Brave Army - Feng Zhanhai, to the north of Chifeng
  - 10th Cavalry Division - Deng Wen
  - 11th Cavalry Division - Tan Zixin
  - 12th Cavalry Division - Wu Songlin
  - 21st Cavalry Brigade - Guo Fenglai
  - 1st Infantry Brigade - Tang Zhongxin

4th Army Group - Wan Fulin* (former chairman of Heilongjiang)

- 53rd Army - Wan Fulin
  - 130th Division - Zhu Hongxun, at Yebaishou - Dachengzi
  - 119th Division - Sun Dequan, Dachengzi – Lingnan
  - 129th Division - Wang Yongsheng, Pingquan – Sanshijia
  - 116th Division - Miao Chengliu, Lamadong – Yiyuankou
  - 106th Division - Shen Ke, Daordeng – Tangdaohe
  - 11th Artillery Regiment, Lingyuan
  - 108th Division - Yang Zhengzhi, East of Lingnan on February 27

== Sources ==
- Jowett, Phillip J., Rays of the Rising Sun Vol 1., Helion & Co. Ltd. 2004.
- "第二部分：从"九一八"事变到西安事变榆关 热河失守 | Shanhai Pass and Jehol falls into enemy handsauthor= Guo Rugui, editor-in-chief Huang Yuzhang". 中国抗日战争正面战场作战记 [China's Anti-Japanese War Combat Operations]. Jiangsu People's Publishing House. 2005-07-01.
