= Qin–Doihara Agreement =

1935 treaty between Japan and China

The Qin–Doihara Agreement (Chinese: 秦土协定; Japanese: 土肥原・秦徳純協定, romanized: Doihara-Qín Déchún) was a treaty that resolved the North Chahar Incident of 27 June 1935 between the Empire of Japan and the Republic of China. The agreement was made between Kwantung Army negotiator, Kenji Doihara, representing Japan, and Deputy Commander of the Kuomintang 29th Army, General Qin Dechun (Ch'in Te-ch'un), representing China. It resulted in the demilitarisation of Chahar.

As a result of the Qin–Doihara Agreement it was agreed:

1.) The commander of the regiment that had detained the Japanese soldiers and the judge advocate of the division concerned was to be dismissed and punished.
2.) All units of the Chinese 29th Army were to be withdrawn from the districts of Chahar Province north of Zhangbei.
3.) The maintenance of peace and order was to be entrusted to the Peace Preservation Corps of Chahar Province.
4.) No Chinese were to be permitted to migrate to and settle in the northern part of Chahar province in the future.
5.) No activities of the Kuomintang were to be permitted in Chahar Province.
6.) All anti-Japanese institutions and acts were to be banned in Chahar Province.

As a result of the Agreement, Qin became head of the Chahar Provisional Government.

As with the previous He-Umezu Agreement, which gave Japan virtual control over the province of Hebei, the Qin–Doihara Agreement was a first step in the establishment of Japanese control over northern China and Inner Mongolia. The Agreement resulted in considerable anti-Japanese sentiment in China and was one of the causes of the December 9th Movement at the end of 1935.

== See also ==
- Second Sino-Japanese War
