= Tan Pingshan =

Chinese socialist politician

- 谭平山
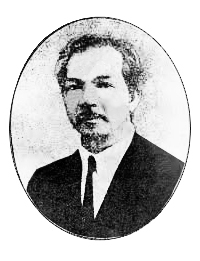

Member of the Central Committee of the Chinese Communist Party
- In office 12 June 1923 – August 1930

Minister of Agriculture of the Republic of China
- In office 1937–1949

Personal details
- Born: 28 September 1886 Gaoming, Guangdong, Qing dynasty
- Died: 2 April 1956 (aged 69) Beijing, China
- Party: Tongmenghui (1907–1912); Chinese Communist Party (Expelled between 1930–1949); Kuomintang (1924–1949)
- Spouse: Sun Sunquan
- Education: Peking University
- Occupation: Politician

Tan Pingshan (Chinese: 譚平山; pinyin: Tán Píngshān; Jyutping: Taam^{4} Ping^{4}saan^{1}; 28 September 1886 – 2 April 1956) was a Chinese revolutionary socialist and an early member of the Chinese Communist Party (CCP) from Gaoming, Guangdong. He was influential in the Tongmenghui and formed the Guangdong branch of the CCP with the help of Chen Duxiu. He later took part in the formation of the Revolutionary Committee of the Chinese Kuomintang.

== Biography ==
=== Early years ===
Tan was born into a family of tailors. He was admitted to a premier school in Guangzhou in 1905. Upon graduation, he joined the budding Tongmenghui under the influence of Sun Yat-sen. He enrolled into Peking University's philosophy faculty in 1917 whilst participating in the May Fourth Movement. As a protest to the 21 demands he was part of the group of students who surged and set fire to the house of Minister of Transport Cao Rulin, subsequently being arrested for his actions.

=== After the Founding of the Communist Party ===
In 1920 Tan went back to Guangdong to form a Marxist group. He was appointed as the Secretary of the CCP Guangdong branch upon the founding of the Chinese Communist Party in 1921. He participated the 3rd National Congress of the Chinese Communist Party and was elected into the Central Committee. In the 4th and 5th Congress of the CCP, he was reappointed as a member of the Central Committee and also held membership in the Politburo of the Chinese Communist Party. He was influenced by social democracy in Germany and supported Chen Jiongming during the June 16 Incident in 1922.

In August 1927 he was one of the leaders that started the Nanchang Rebellion (albeit holding positions within the KMT) against the Nanjing Nationalist Government led by Chiang Kai-shek. During the course of the rebellion, he recruited He Long into the CCP. Tan went back to Shanghai after the failure of the rebellion. In an enlarged meeting of the Politburo in November, Zhang Guotao appealed to the Comintern for the removal of Tan from the party as he blamed the failure of the Nanchang Uprising due to his leftist-tendencies. Losing his CCP membership, he sought after Deng Yanda for assistance in setting up an alternative Marxist enclave but was to no avail.

=== Membership in the Kuomintang ===
Tan participated in the 1st National Congress of the Kuomintang (KMT) in 1924 and was elected into the Standing Central Committee and appointed as a Minister in the Central Organization Department of Kuomintang. In March 1937 he was appointed as a member of the Wuhan National Government and retained his post as the Minister for Agriculture.

At the outbreak of the Second Sino-Japanese War, Tan returned to Wuhan seeking to help the Nationalist Party. Warmly received by Chiang Kai-shek, he restored his dormant membership in the KMT and was soon elected into the 1st to 4th National Political Council. In 1942, Tan married Sun Sunquan in Chongqing. In January 1948, he was in Hong Kong to participate in the founding of the Revolutionary Committee of the Chinese Kuomintang and served in the Central Standing Committee.

=== Post-1949 ===
In 1949 September, he participated in the first plenary session of the Chinese People's Political Consultative Conference and was elected to the Presidium of the Standing Committee. After the establishment of the People's Republic of China, he served as a member in the Central People's Government, the Government Affairs Council (zh: 中央人民政府政务院), the State Council's Supervision Commission and other staff positions. In September 1954 he was elected to Standing Committee of the National People's Congress. He died in Beijing on 2 April 1956.
