= East Hebei Autonomous Government =

Japanese puppet/buffer state in northern China from 1935 to 1938

Coordinates: 39°48′N 116°48′E

East Hebei Autonomous Government 冀東防共自治政府 Pinyin: Jìdōng Fánggòng Zìzhì Zhèngfǔ Japanese: Kitō Bōkyō Jichi Seifu
- 1935–1938
- Flag

- Status: Puppet state of the Empire of Japan
- Capital: Tongzhou (1935–1937); Tangshan (1937–1938)
- Common languages: Mandarin, Japanese
- Government: Republic under a dictatorship
- Chairman
  - 1935–1937: Yin Ju-keng
  - 1937–1938: Chi Zongmo
- Historical era: Second Sino-Japanese War
  - Tanggu Truce: 31 May 1933
  - He–Umezu Agreement: 10 June 1935
  - Chin–Doihara Agreement: 27 June 1935
  - Formed: 25 November 1935
  - Tongzhou mutiny: 29 July 1937
  - Dissolved: 1 February 1938
- Currency: Chi Tung Bank-issued yuan, on par with Japanese yen and Manchukuo yuan
Preceded by	Succeeded by
Republic of China	Provisional Government of the Republic of China
- Today part of: China ∟ Beijing ∟ Hebei

The East Hebei Autonomous Government (Chinese: 冀東防共自治政府; pinyin: Jìdōng Fánggòng Zìzhì Zhèngfǔ), also known as the East Ji Autonomous Government and the East Hebei Autonomous Anti-Communist Government, was a short-lived late-1930s state in northern China. It has been described by historians as either a Japanese puppet state or a buffer state.

== History ==
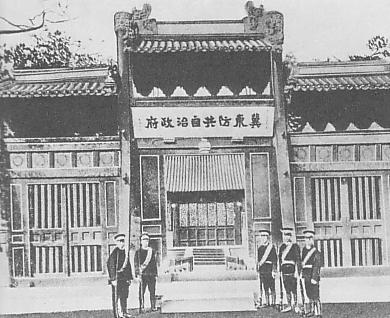
East Hebei Autonomous Government building

After the creation of Manchukuo and subsequent military action by the Imperial Japanese Army, which brought Northeastern China east of the Great Wall under Japanese control, the Empire of Japan and the Republic of China signed the Tanggu Truce, which established a demilitarised zone south of the Great Wall, extending from Tianjin to Beiping. Under the terms of the truce and the subsequent He-Umezu Agreement of 1935, this demilitarized zone was also purged of the political and military influence of the Kuomintang government of China.

On 15 November 1935, the local Chinese administrator of the 22 counties in Hebei province, Yin Ju-keng, proclaimed the territories under his control to be autonomous. Ten days later, on 25 November, he proclaimed them to be independent of the Republic of China and to have their capital at Tongzhou. The new government immediately signed economic and military treaties with Japan. The Demilitarized Zone Peace Preservation Corps that had been created by the Tanggu Truce was disbanded and reorganized as the East Hebei Army with Japanese military support. The Japanese goal was to establish a buffer zone between Manchukuo and China, but the pro-Japanese collaborationist regime was seen as an affront by the Chinese government and a violation of the Tanggu Truce.

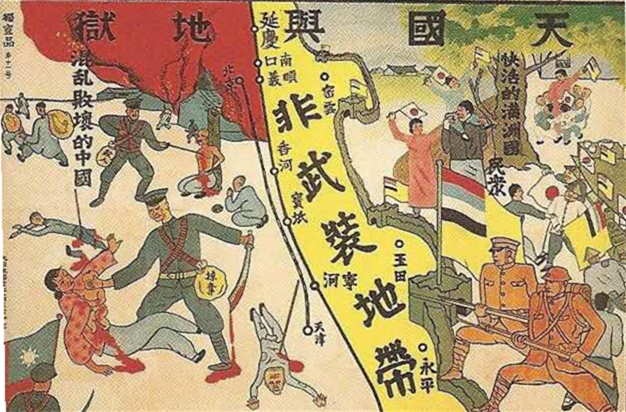
Japanese propaganda, unarmed zone in East Hebei

The East Hebei Autonomous government received a response in the form of Gen. Song Zheyuan's Hebei-Chahar Political Government, which was under the Nanjing government, launched on 18 December 1935. Chinese soldiers remained in the area.

In July 1936, a peasant uprising against the East Hebei Autonomous Government broke out in Miyun District. Led by an old Taoist priest, the rebels were organized by the Yellow Sand Society and managed to defeat an East Hebei Army unit that was sent to suppress them. Thereafter, the Imperial Japanese Army mobilized to quell the uprising, defeating the peasant rebels by September. About 300 Yellow Sand insurgents were killed or wounded in the fighting.

The East Hebei government survived the Tongzhou mutiny in late July 1937 before being absorbed into the collaborationist Provisional Government of China in February 1938.

== See also ==
- Demilitarized Zone Peace Preservation Corps
- History of Beijing

== Sources ==
- Morning Tribune Staff (30 July 1936). "Yellow Sand Cult to be suppressed by Japanese". Morning Tribune. Vol. 1, no. 154. Peiping. p. 9.
- The China Monthly Review Staff (20 August 1936). ""Yellow Sand" Society Suppressed by Japanese in Demilitarized Zone". The China Monthly Review. Vol. 77. Custom House, Shanghai. p. 473.
