= Yin Ju-keng =

20th-century politician in Republican China and puppet states of Imperial Japan

Yin Ju-keng 殷汝耕
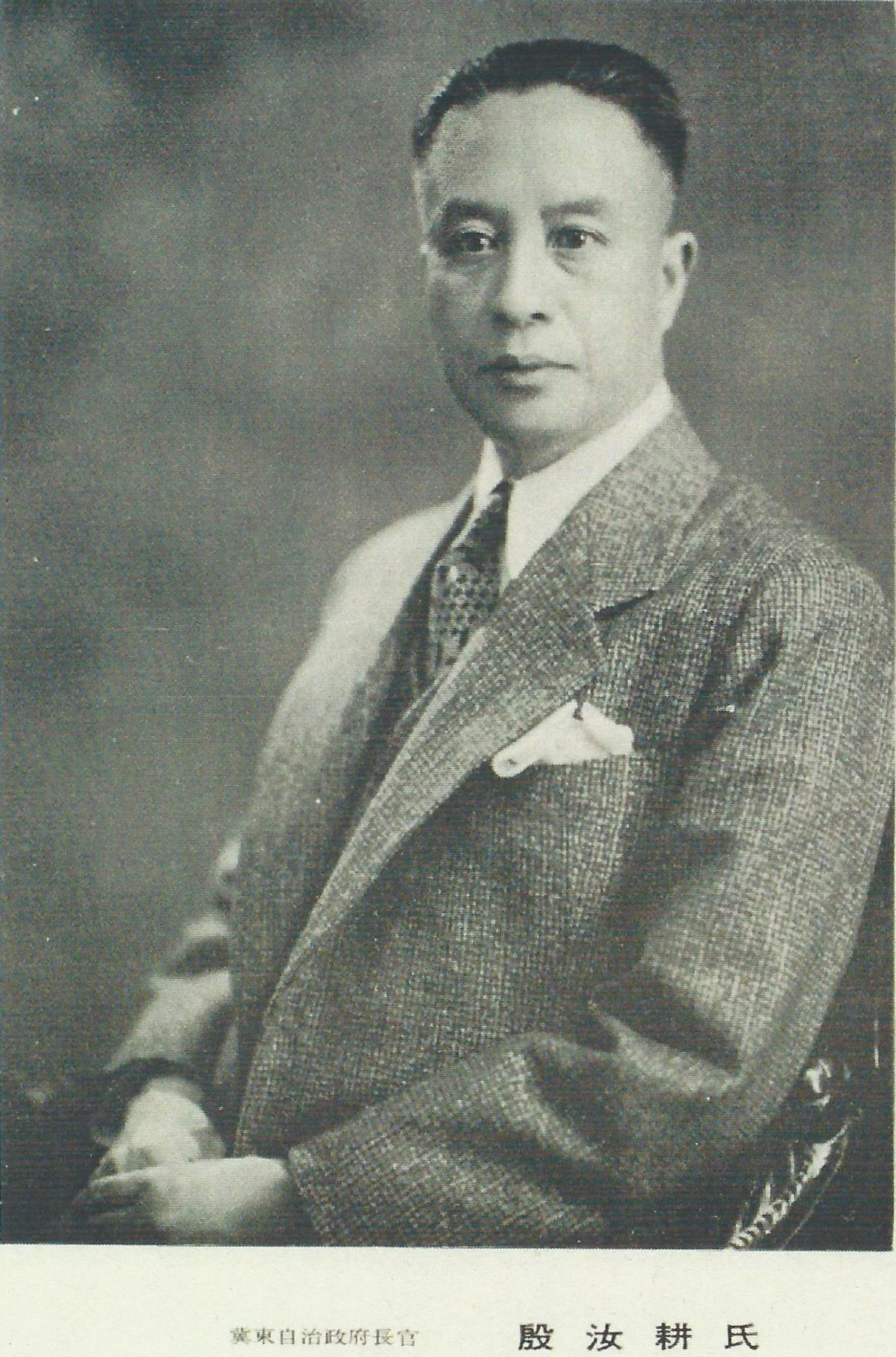

Chairman of the East Hebei Autonomous Government
- In office 25 November 1935 – 29 July 1937
- Preceded by: Position established
- Succeeded by: Chi Zongmo

Personal details
- Born: 1885 Fuzhou, Fujian, Qing China
- Died: December 1, 1947 (aged 61–62) Nanjing, Republic of China
- Education: University of Tokyo; Waseda University

Yin Ju-keng; (Chinese: 殷汝耕; pinyin: Yīn Rǔgēng; Wade–Giles: Yin Ju-keng; Hepburn: In Jyokou; 1885 - December 1, 1947) was a politician in the early Republic of China, later noted for his role as chairman in the Japanese-controlled East Hebei Autonomous Government and subsequent puppet regimes, such as the Wang Jingwei regime, during the Second Sino-Japanese War.

== Biography ==
Yin was a native of Fuzhou with ancestral roots in Wenzhou, Zhejiang province. In 1902, he was dispatched by his wealthy father to Japan, where he studied Japanese language and enrolled at the First Higher School (later absorbed by University of Tokyo), a preparatory school for Imperial Universities, in Tokyo in 1905. The following year, he enrolled in the Seventh Higher School Zoshikan (now Kagoshima University) in Kagoshima City. During his stay in Japan, he became an active member of the Tongmenghui movement to overthrown the Qing Dynasty, and also married a Japanese woman. Per the orders of Tongmenghui leader Huang Xing, he returned to China to oversee revolutionary activities in Hubei province. After the Republic of China had been established, he joined the Kuomintang. After participating in the 2nd Kuomintang party conference in 1913, he decided to return to Japan to complete his studies at Waseda University, where he majored in law. He returned to China in 1916, entering into service with the Beiyang Government, helping establish the Bank of China and playing an active role in opposing the Constitutional Protection Movement. After the Zhili–Anhui War, he fled briefly back to Japan. On his return to China, he found the country rapidly dissolving into warlordism. Yin went into the service of Fengtian clique General Guo Songling, and was assigned charge of foreign affairs. However, Guo was killed months later in a revolt against Manchurian warlord Zhang Zuolin, and Yin again sought refuge on Japanese territory.

In 1926, Yin joined Chiang Kai-shek's Northern Expedition, participating in the capture of Nanchang. He was appointed to the post of communications director for the National Revolutionary Army, and tasked with negotiations between Kuomintang forces and the Imperial Japanese Army. The following year, after the Shanghai massacre of 1927, he entered into the service of Shanghai mayor Huang Fu as chief secretary, and was again tasked with maintaining communications and relations with the Japanese. He was the chief negotiator on the Chinese side after the Jinan Incident in 1928. Later that year, he was recalled into service with the National Revolutionary Army. After the Shanghai Incident of 1932, he helped negotiate the Shanghai Ceasefire Agreement.

Yin became commissioner of the Luantung Area of the demilitarized zone created by this Agreement in Hebei Province in 1933. With the encouragement of Kwantung Army General Kenji Doihara, on November 15, 1935, Yin proclaimed the area under his administration as the East Hebei Autonomous Government, and independent of the Kuomintang government. However, in July 1937, a detachment of approximately 800 soldiers of the Chinese 29th Army under command of General Song Zheyuan and loyal to the Kuomintang (KMT) government, camped outside the walls of Yin’s capital of Tongzhou, and refused to leave despite protests from its Japanese garrison commander. Unknown to the Japanese, General Song had reached an agreement with Yin, in hope of using the Kuomintang troops to rid himself of Japanese presence in his government. The end result was a battle between the Japanese and KMT troops, mutiny of East Hebei Army troops against their Japanese overlords, and a subsequent massacre of the town's ethnic Japanese and ethnic Korean population (see Tongzhou mutiny).

Yin was captured by the Japanese Army after the mutiny's failure, but spared from execution by the Japanese through the personal intervention of Toyama Mitsuru. Allowed back to Beijing after a five-year exile in Japan, he returned to public life after the establishment of the Wang Jingwei Government, but was appointed to only a relatively minor position in Shanxi province in 1942. Appointed to the Legal Affairs Department of the Nanjing National Government from the January 1944, he remained dissatisfied with the positions he was assigned, and resigned from government. He returned to Beijing in June.

Yin was arrested by the Republic of China after the surrender of Japan and tried for treason against the Chinese people. At his trial in Nanjing he protested his arrest vehemently, stating that everything he had done had been out of patriotism for China. His case was decided by the Supreme Court, which sentenced him to death on November 8, 1947. Still protesting his innocence, Yin was executed by firing squad on December 1, 1947, at Nanjing.
