= Nanyuan Subdistrict, Beijing =

Nanyuan Subdistrict 南苑街道
- Subdistrict
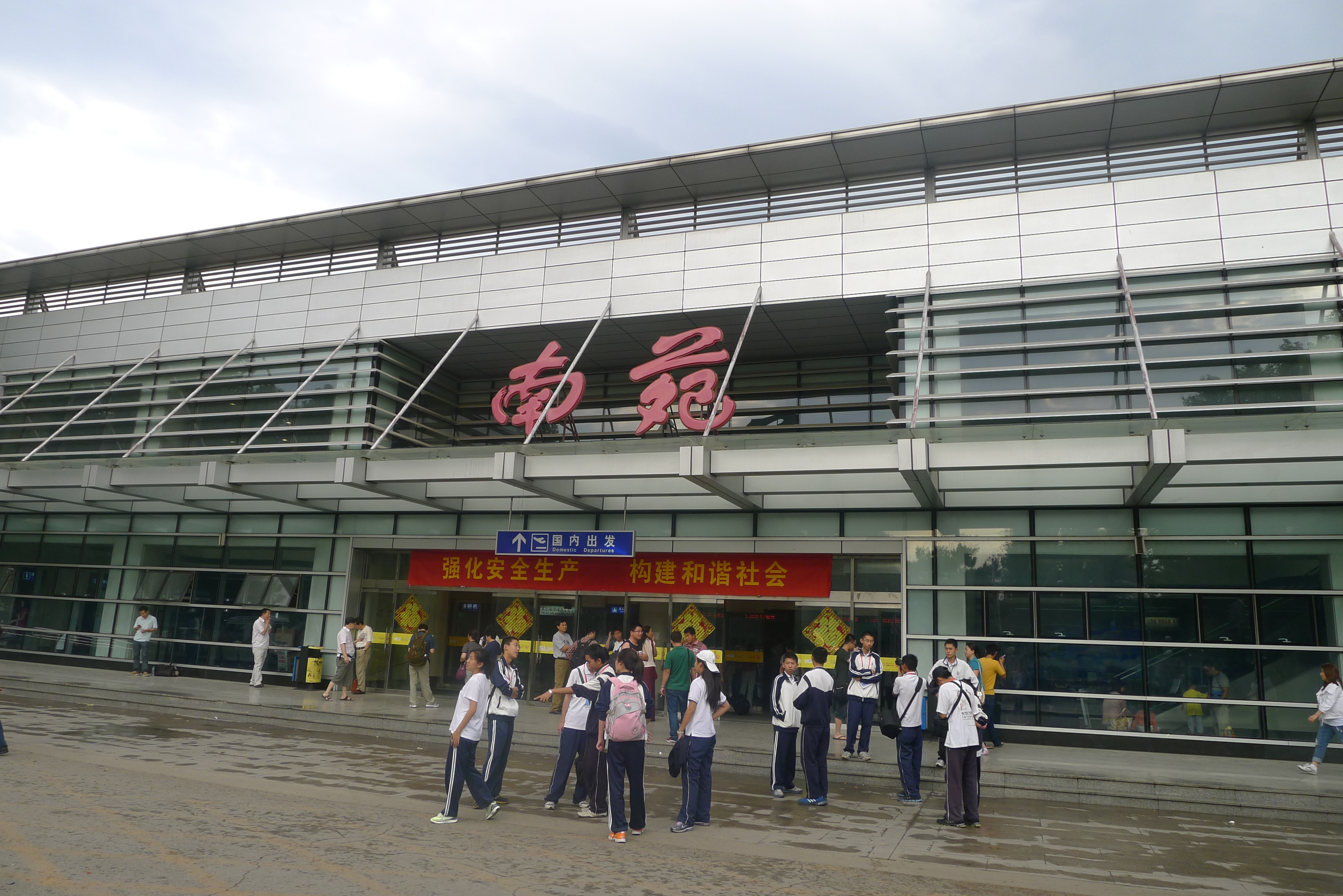
- Nanyuan Airport, 2011

- Location within Beijing Location within China
- Coordinates: 39°48′12″N 116°23′17″E
- Country: China
- Municipality: Beijing
- District: Fengtai
- Village-level Divisions: 17 communities 3 village

Area
  - Total: 17.8 km^{2} (6.9 sq mi)

Population (2020)
  - Total: 61,926
  - Density: 3,480/km^{2} (9,010/sq mi)
- Time zone: UTC+8 (China Standard)
- Postal code: 100076
- Area code: 010

Nanyuan Subdistrict (Chinese: 南苑街道; pinyin: Nányuàn Jiēdào) is one of the 14 subdistricts of Fengtai District, Beijing, China. It is located on the southeastern corner of Fengtai, neighbors Heyi Subdistrict and Nanyuan Township to the north, Donggaodi Subdistrict and Jiugong Township to the east, Xihongmen Township to the south, and Nanyuan Township to the west. The subdistrict has 61,926 residents as of 2020.

The subdistrict's current name (Chinese: 南苑; lit. 'South Pasture') comes from its location as southern part of the Imperial Garden of that used to exist in the region.

== History ==
History of changes in the status of Nanyuan Subdistrict
Year	Status
1935	Established as Nanyuan Town, Part of Daxing County
1948	Part of the 15th District of Beijing
1949	Started to host the government of Nanyuan District
1990	Transformed to Nanyuan Subdistrict

== Administrative Division ==
As of 2021, Nanyuan Subdistrict is made up of 20 subdivisions, with 17 communities and 3 villages:

Administrative Division Code	Community Names	Name Transliteration	Type
110106005002	东新华	Dongxinhua	Community
110106005005	红房子	Hongfangzi	Community
110106005006	西宏苑	Xihongyuan	Community
110106005007	诚苑	Chengyuan	Community
110106005008	槐房	Huaifang	Community
110106005009	机场	Jichang	Community
110106005010	翠海明苑	Cuihai Mingyuan	Community
110106005011	南庭新苑南区	Nanting Xinyuan Nanqu	Community
110106005012	南庭新苑北区	Nanting Xinyuan Beiqu	Community
110106005013	阳光星苑	Yangguang Xingyuan	Community
110106005014	阳光星苑南区	Yangguang Xingyuan Nanqu	Community
110106005015	合顺家园	Heshun Jiayuan	Community
110106005016	京粮悦谷	Jingliang Yuegu	Community
110106005017	德鑫嘉园	Dexin Jiayuan	Community
110106005018	新宫	Xingong	Community
110106005019	御槐园	Yuhuaiyuan	Community
110106005020	天悦佳苑	Tianyuejiayuan	Community
110106005200	南苑	Nanyuan	Village
110106005201	槐房	Huaifang	Village
110106005202	新宫	Xingong	Village

== See also ==
- List of township-level divisions of Beijing
