= Li Jizhun =

Li Jizhun (1875–?), a Chinese general from the beginning of the Republic of China, leader of a Japanese puppet force in southeast Manchukuo from 1933 -1935.

Li Jizhun, born in Hubei in 1875, became a general after serving in the Republican Army during the Xinhai Revolution. During the Warlord Era little is known of his activities. In early 1933, following the Japanese invasion of Manchuria and the establishment of Manchukuo Li appeared in southeast Liaoning province at the head of several thousand men calling themselves the "National Salvation Army", and flying the old five-barred flag of the Chinese Republic.

At first, Li's force was fighting the Anti-Japanese guerrillas, despite their claim to be ready to fight the Japanese. They then served with the Manchukuoan forces in the Japanese Operation Nekka in 1933. After that they began to make trouble in the disputed area between Manchukuo and northern China with the intent to establish an "independent" government there with the help of the Japanese, and they captured some small towns. However, with the Tanggu Truce, and the establishment of the demilitarized zone, Li's army, now about 10,000 strong, was no longer wanted. The Japanese disbanded it, with only 2,000 of its men being recruited to serve in the demilitarized zone's Peace Preservation Corps.

General Li disappeared. Reports at the time believed him to have retired to the Japanese Concession in Tianjin.

== Sources ==
- Jowett, Philip S., Rays of the Rising Sun: China & Manchukuo, Vol. 1, Helion & Co. Ltd. 2004, ISBN 9781874622215.
