= Yu Xuezhong =

Chinese general (1890–1964)

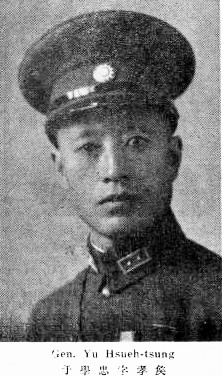
Yu Xuezhong (early 1930s)

Yu Xuezhong (simplified Chinese: 于学忠; traditional Chinese: 于學忠; pinyin: Yú Xuézhōng; Wade–Giles: Yu Hsueh-chung; 19 November 1890 - 22 September 1964) was a Chinese National Revolutionary Army general during the Second Sino-Japanese War and Kuomintang politician. He later served as a politician in the People's Republic of China after the establishment of the communist regime.

== Biography ==
Yu was born in Penglai, Shandong. His father was also a military officer, serving in the Qing Imperial Army. Yu graduated from the Beiyang Army Officers Academy in 1911, the final year of the Qing Dynasty, and initially was a loyalist of Yuan Shikai. After Yuan's death he joined Wu Peifu and later the Manchurian warlord Zhang Xueliang. This association was to prove important, as Yu was one of several military commanders of the Northeastern faction that favored resistance against Japan and collaboration with the Communists, and were highly distrustful of Chiang Kai-shek.

Among other posts, Yu Xuezhong served as commander of the Beijing–Tianjin Garrison Headquarters (1929–1931), Governor of Hebei (1932–1935) and Governor of Gansu (1935–1937). During the Second Sino–Japanese War he commanded the 51st Corps in the Battle of Tai'erzhuang, Battle of Xuzhou and Battle of Wuhan. He was in command of the guerrilla forces in the Shandong–Jiangsu War Area from 1939 to 1941 and also served in the Military Affairs Commission. Finally, he was vice president of the Military Advisory Council (1944–1945).

After the end of the war he was elected to the Central Executive Committee of the Kuomintang. In May 1947, he served as a member of the Strategic Advisory Committee of the Presidential Palace, under Chiang Kai-shek; he also became a member of the Presidium of the National Assembly in April of the following year.

In January 1949, as the Communist forces of Mao Zedong moved to achieve victory in the Chinese Civil War, Yu joined the Revolutionary Committee of the Chinese Kuomintang and actively collaborated with the Communists.

After the founding of the People's Republic of China, he served as a member of the Chinese People's Political Consultative Conference (1949–1964), member of the Central Military Commission, (1949–1964), and chairman of the Hebei Province Sports Commission (1952–1964).

He died in Beijing on 22 September 1964 at the age of 73.
