= Battle of Beiping–Tianjin =

1937 battle of the Second Sino-Japanese War

Battle of Beiping-Tianjin
- Part of the Second Sino-Japanese War and the interwar period
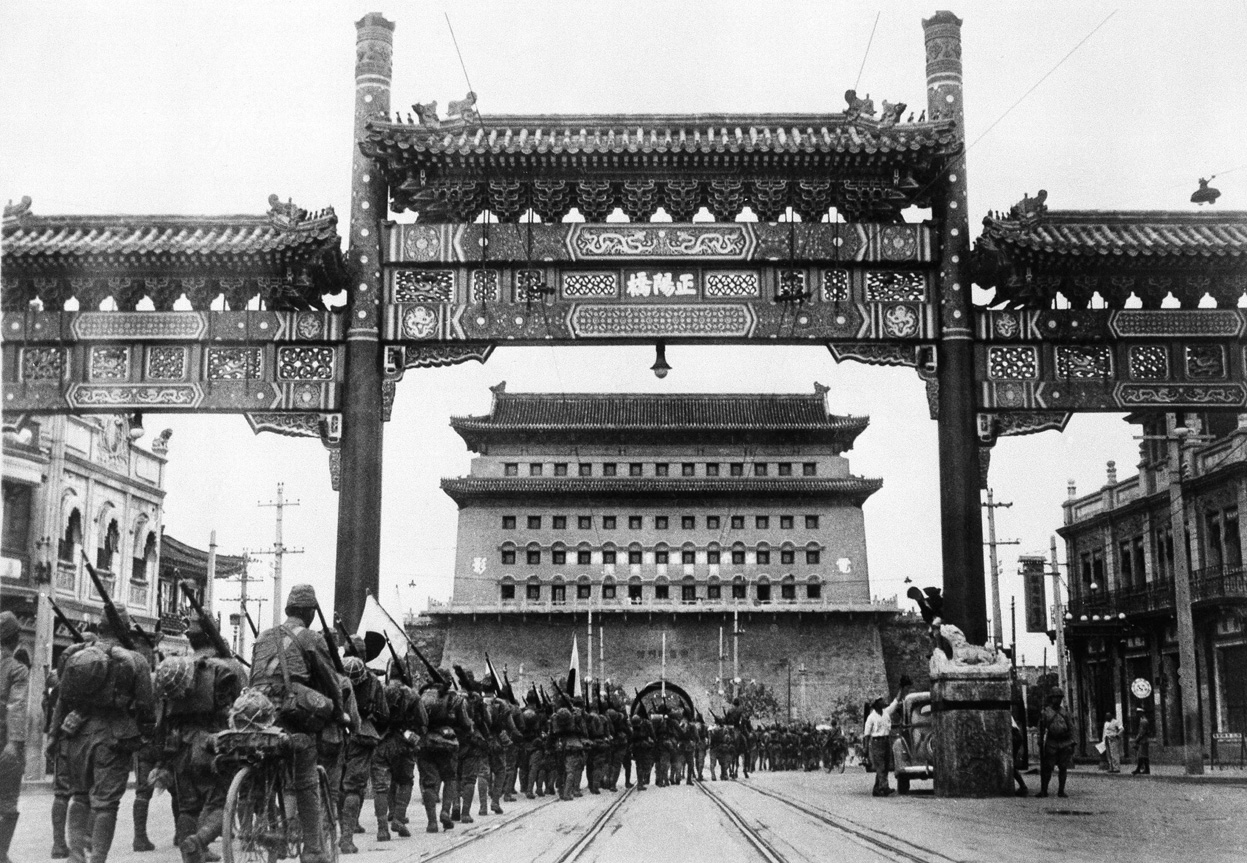
- Japanese troops march into the Zhengyangmen gate in Beijing after capturing the city.
Date	July 7 – August 8, 1937 (1 month and 1 day)
Location	Vicinity of Beiping city – Tianjin city in the Republic of China
Result	Japanese victory

Belligerents
(Empire of Japan) Japan: East Hebei	(Republic of China (1912–1949)) China

Commanders and leaders
Kanichiro Tashiro; Kiyoshi Katsuki	Song Zheyuan (Republic of China (1912–1949)) Zhao Dengyu † (Republic of China (1912–1949)) Tong Linge †

Strength
180,000+	~75,000+

Casualties and losses
Until July 30, 1937 : 1,241 casualties including approximately 400 killed, approximately 800 wounded.	29th Army from the Marco Polo Bridge incident until 3 August 1937 : 5,000+ casualties 5,000+ killed 29th Army and police forces from the Marco Polo Bridge incident until 3 August 1937 : approximately 15,000 casualties, 6,000+ soldiers of the 39th independent brigade in Beiping and 4,000+ Tianjin police members disarmed by the Japanese Army.

The Battle of Beiping–Tianjin (simplified Chinese: 平津作战; traditional Chinese: 平津作戰; pinyin: Píng Jīn Zùozhàn), also known as the Battle of Beiping, Battle of Peiping, Battle of Beijing, Battle of Peiking, the Peiking–Tientsin Operation, and by the Japanese as the North China Incident (北支事変, Hokushi jihen) (25–31 July 1937) was a series of battles of the Second Sino-Japanese War fought in the proximity of Beiping (now Beijing) and Tianjin. It resulted in a Japanese victory.

== Background ==
During the Marco Polo Bridge Incident on 8 July 1937, the Japanese China Garrison Army attacked the walled city of Wanping (宛平鎮) after an ultimatum to allow its forces to search for an allegedly missing soldier had elapsed. Wanping, in the neighborhood of Lugou Bridge, was on the main railway line west of Beijing and was of considerable strategic importance. Prior to July 1937, Japanese forces had repeatedly demanded the withdrawal of the Chinese forces stationed at this place.

Chinese General Song Zheyuan ordered his forces to hold their positions and attempted to avert war through diplomacy.

On 9 July 1937, the Japanese offered a ceasefire and truce, one of the conditions of which was that the Chinese 37th Division, which had proven "hostile" to Japan, be replaced with another division from the Chinese 29th Army. This condition was agreed to by the Chinese the same day. However, from midnight of 9 July, Japanese violations of the ceasefire began to increase and Japanese reinforcements continued to arrive. Lieutenant General Kanichiro Tashiro, commander of the Japanese China Garrison Army, fell ill and died on 12 July and was replaced by Lieutenant General Kiyoshi Katsuki.

Muslim General Ma Bufang of the Ma clique notified the Chinese government that he was prepared to lead his army into battle against the Japanese when they started the attack on Beijing. Immediately after the Marco Polo Bridge Incident, Ma Bufang arranged for a cavalry division under the Muslim General Ma Biao to be sent east to battle the Japanese. Ethnic Turkic Salar Muslims made up the majority of the first cavalry division which was sent by Ma Bufang.

== Diplomatic maneuverings ==
Meanwhile, the Japanese civilian government of Prime Minister Konoe in Tokyo held an extraordinary cabinet meeting on 8 July 1937, and resolved to attempt to defuse hostilities and settle the issue diplomatically. However, the Imperial Japanese Army General Staff authorized the deployment of an infantry division from the Chosen Army, two independent combined brigades from the Kwantung Army and an air regiment as reinforcements. This deployment was rescinded on 11 July on news that negotiations were being held by the commander of the Japanese Northern China Area Army and the Chinese 29th Army on location, and with Japanese diplomats at the Chinese capital of Nanjing. However, even after General Song Zheyuan, Commander of the 29th Army and head of the Hebei-Chahar Political Council, was reported to have come to terms on 18 July, the Japanese Army pushed forward the deployment of reinforcements citing lack of sincerity on part of the Chinese central government. This mobilization was strongly opposed by General Kanji Ishihara on the grounds that an unnecessary escalation in the conflict with China was endangering Japan's position in Manchukuo vis-à-vis the Soviet Union. At Ishihara's urging, the deployment was delayed while Konoe used his personal contacts with Japanese acquaintances of Sun Yat-sen in an effort to establish a direct diplomatic settlement with the Kuomintang central government in Nanjing. This secret diplomacy failed when elements within the Japanese military detained Konoe's emissary on 23 July, and the mobilization of reinforcements was restarted on 29 July.

One week later, the Commander of the Japanese Northern China Area Army reported that, having exhausted every means of peaceful settlement, he had decided to use force to "chastise" the Chinese 29th Army and requested approval from Tokyo. In the meantime, mobilization orders were issued for four more infantry divisions.

== Langfang Incident ==
Despite the nominal truce, numerous violations of the ceasefire continued, including another shelling of Wanping by Japanese artillery on 14 July 1937.

By 25 July, Japanese reinforcements in the form of the IJA 20th Division arrived and fighting reerupted first at Langfang, a city on the railroad between Beijing and Tianjin, between companies of Japanese and Chinese troops. A second clash occurred on 26 July 1937, when a Japanese brigade attempted to force its way through Guanghuamen Gate in Beijing to "protect Japanese nationals". The same day Japanese planes bombed Langfang.

The Japanese then issued an ultimatum to General Song demanding the withdrawal of all Chinese forces from the outskirts of Beijing to the west of the Yongding River within 24 hours. Song refused, ordered his units to prepare for action, and requested large reinforcements from the central government, which were not provided.

On 27 July 1937, as the Japanese laid siege to Chinese forces in Tongzhou, one Chinese battalion broke out and fell back to Nanyuan. Japanese planes also bombed Chinese forces outside Beiping and reconnoitered Kaifeng, Zhengzhou and Luoyang. On the same day Emperor Hirohito sanctioned an imperial order to bring stability to the strategic areas in the region.

On 28 July 1937, the IJA 20th Division and three independent combined brigades launched an offensive against Beijing, backed by close air support. The main attack was against Nanyuan and a secondary attack against Beiyuan. Bitter fighting ensued with both General Tong Linge Deputy Commander of Chinese 29th Army and General Zhao Dengyu commanding Chinese 132nd Division being killed, and their units suffering heavy casualties. However, a brigade of Chinese 38th Division under General Liu Chen-san pushed back the Japanese in the Langfang area while a brigade of the Chinese 53rd Army and a portion of the Chinese 37th Division recovered the railway station at Fengtai.

However, this was only a temporary respite, and by nightfall General Song admitted that further combat was futile and withdrew the main force of Chinese 29th Army south of the Yungging River. Tianjin Major General Zhang Zizhong was left in Beiping to take charge of political affairs in Hebei and Chahar provinces with virtually no troops. General Liu Ruzhen's New Separate 29th Brigade was left in Beijing to maintain public order.

== Tongzhou mutiny ==
On 29 July 1937, the Japanese collaborationist East Hebei Army troops mutinied against the Japanese in Tongzhou, killing most of their Japanese advisors and other civilians, including women and children.

== Fall of Tianjin ==
Meanwhile, on the coast at dawn of 29 July, the IJA 5th Division and Japanese naval forces separately attacked Tianjin and the port at Tanggu, which were defended by units of Chinese 38th Division and volunteers under acting commander Liu Wen-tien. General Huang Wei-kang's brigade defended the Taku Forts gallantly and also attacked a nearby Japanese airfield, destroying many aircraft. However, with increasing Japanese reinforcements his position was untenable, and that night (30 July) General Zhang Zizhong was ordered to withdraw toward Machang and Yangliuching south of Tianjin, abandoning the city and Taku Forts to the Japanese.

== Fall of Beijing ==
On 28 July 1937, Chiang Kai-shek ordered Song Zheyuan to retreat to Baoding in southern Hebei province. Over the next two days, intense fighting took place in Tianjin, where the Chinese forces put up a stiff resistance, but subsequently the Chinese retreated south along the lines of the Tianjin-Pukou Railway and the Beiping-Hankou Railway.

On 4 August, General Liu Ruzhen's remaining forces withdrew into Chahar. Isolated, Beiping was captured by the Japanese without further resistance on 8 August 1937. General Masakazu Kawabe entered the city on 18 August in a military parade, and posted proclamations at important points announcing that he was the new military governor of the city. Zhang was allowed to retain his position as mayor, but left the city secretly a week later.

== Aftermath ==
With the fall of Beijing and Tianjin, the North China Plain was helpless against the Japanese divisions which occupied it by the end of the year. The Chinese National Revolutionary Army was in constant retreat until the hard-fought Battle of Taierzhuang.

Zhang was vilified relentlessly by the Chinese press, and reviled as a traitor. Upon arrival at Nanjing he apologized publicly. Since he later died fighting against the Japanese, the Kuomintang posthumously pardoned Zhang for the events in Beijing.

== See also ==
- History of Beijing

== Sources ==
- Hsu Long-hsuen and Chang Ming-kai, History of The Sino-Japanese War (1937-1945) 2nd Ed., 1971. Translated by Wen Ha-hsiung, Chung Wu Publishing; 33, 140th Lane, Tung-hwa Street, Taipei, Taiwan Republic of China. Pg.177-180 Map 2
- Dorn, Frank (1974). The Sino-Japanese War, 1937-41: From Marco Polo Bridge to Pearl Harbor. MacMillan. ISBN 0-02-532200-1.
- Dryburgh, Marjorie (2000). North China and Japanese Expansion 1933-1937: Regional Power and the National Interest. RoutledgeCurzon. ISBN 0-7007-1274-7.
- Lu, David J (1961). From The Marco Polo Bridge To Pearl Harbor: A Study Of Japan's Entry Into World War II. Public Affairs Press. ASIN B000UV6MFQ.
- Furuya, Keiji (1981). The riddle of the Marco Polo bridge: To verify the first shot. Symposium on the History of the Republic of China. ASIN: B0007BJI7I.
