= He–Umezu Agreement =

1935 agreement between Japan and China

The He-Umezu Agreement (梅津・何應欽協定, Umezu-Ka Okin Kyōtei) (Chinese: 何梅協定) was a secret agreement between the Republic of China and the Empire of Japan that was concluded on 10 June 1935, two years prior to the outbreak of general hostilities during the Second Sino-Japanese War.

== Background ==
Since 1931, Japan had provoked numerous incidents and on multiple occasions, violated Chinese sovereignty. The Tanggu Truce established a demilitarized zone between Japanese-occupied territories and North China in 1933, but conflict continued unabated by proxy armies in Inner Mongolia. However, with the appointment of Kōki Hirota as Foreign Minister of Japan, the Japanese civilian government attempted to improve Sino-Japanese relations. On 22 January 1935, Japan announced a policy of nonaggression against China. In response, the Chinese government's Wang Jingwei announced a suspension of the Chinese boycott of Japanese goods, and both countries agreed to upgrade relations to the ambassadorial level.

However, the improved relations between Japan and China were counter to the aims of the Japanese Kwantung Army for further territorial expansion.

On 29 May 1935, General Takashi Sakai, Chief of Staff of the Japanese China Garrison Army, which was based in Tianjin, acted on the pretext that two pro-Japanese heads of a local news service had been assassinated and raised a formal protest to the Kuomintang General He Yingqin, Acting Chairman of the Peiping National Military Council. The Japanese Army demanded the dismissal of Hebei Provincial Chairman General Yu Xuezhong from his posts and for the Kuomintang to cease all political activities in Hebei, including the cities of Tianjin and Peiping (now Beijing).

On 30 May, Japanese armored forces paraded in front of the Chinese government offices in a show of force. On 4 June, Sakai repeated his demands and threatened drastic action if the demands were not fully accepted. However, on 5 June, additional demands were added:

- The replacement of Tianjin Mayor Chang Ting-ngo and Chief of Police Lee Chun-hsiang and the relief of Commander of the 3rd Military Police Regiment Chiang Hsiao-hsien and Director of the Political Training Department Ts'eng Kwang-ching.
- The withdrawal of the Kuomintang military force from Hebei.
- The disbarment of all anti-Japanese organizations throughout China, especially the Blue Shirts Society
- The dealing with the assassins of the heads of pro-Japanese news services to be apprehended, with compensation to be paid to the victims' families

On 7 June, forward units of the Kwantung Army moved to the front lines at the Great Wall. A verbal ultimatum was issued on 9 June, with a deadline for compliance set of 12 June.

Not prepared at the time to go to war with Japan since his forces were still tied down in a campaign to exterminate the Chinese Communist Party, Chiang Kai-shek agreed to comply. The agreement was between General Yoshijirō Umezu, who was commander in chief of the Kwantung Army for Japan, and He Yingqin for China.

== Aftermath ==
The agreement gave Japan virtual control over the Hebei Province under the aegis of the East Hebei Autonomous Council. Although the agreement had been reached in secret, its details were soon leaked to the press, which caused an upsurge in indignation and anti-Japanese sentiment in China. The truce lasted until 7 July 1937, when the Second Sino-Japanese War started.
