= Song Zheyuan =

20th-century Chinese army officer

Song Zheyuan 宋哲元
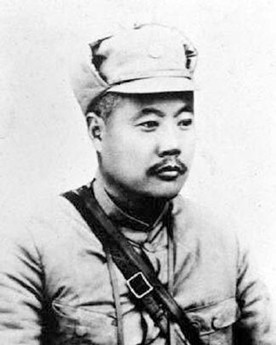
- General Song Zheyuan
- Born: October 30, 1885; Leling, Shandong, Qing dynasty
- Died: April 5, 1940 (aged 54); Mianyang, Sichuan, Republic of China
- Military career
- Allegiance: Qing Dynasty; China
- Service years: 1907–1940
- Rank: General
- Units: Guominjun
- Commands: 29th Army
- Conflicts: Xinhai Revolution; Northern Expedition; Central Plains War; Chinese Civil War; Defense of the Great Wall; Second Sino-Japanese War; Marco Polo Bridge Incident; Battle of Beiping–Tianjin
- Awards: Order of Blue Sky and White Sun
- Other work: military advisor

Song Zheyuan (Chinese: 宋哲元; pinyin: Sòng Zhéyuán; October 30, 1885 – April 5, 1940) was a Chinese general during the Chinese Civil War and Second Sino-Japanese War (1937–1945).

== Biography ==
=== Early life and education ===
Born in the village of Zhaohong, northwest of the seat of Laoling County, Shandong, he was educated under his uncle from his mother's side, a teacher of a traditional Confucian private school in Yanshan County. At the age of 20 (1904) he began studying in the military institute founded by Lu Jianzhang at Beijing and had since become Lu's favorite. In 1912 the troops of Lu and Feng Yuxiang, now subordinates of Yuan Shikai, were regrouped and Feng had then been Song's superior.

=== Military career ===
In 1917, a year after being appointed the head of 1st battalion of Feng's 2nd regiment, his battalion spearheaded the removal of Zhang Xun from his imperial restoration in 1917. As part of the Guominjun he became Governor of Jehol Province in 1926. Following the defeat of the Guominjun in the Anti–Fengtian War Feng Yuxiang participated in the Northern Expedition, Sòng assumed the Chairmanship of Shaanxi province in November 1927 and in April of the same year the head of 4th division under the II Corps of the National Revolutionary Army.

Switching sides to the Kuomintang after the abortive coup d'état in 1930 of Feng against Chiang Kai-shek, his troops were designated as the 29th Army and garrisoned in southern Shanxi province where he was responsible for the frontiers of the Rehe and Chahar provinces against the Japanese in Manchukuo.

== Chair of Chahar province ==
Song was the chairman of Chahar province when Japan invaded the provinces in the end of 1932. Though poorly equipped compared to the better armed Japanese, Song led the 29th army to resist the aggression in a war known as the Defense of the Great Wall (熱河長城之戰). Japanese troops then entered the suburbs of Beijing and Tianjin after the predictable victory. Song was relieved from his post but reinstalled as commander after the He–Umezu Agreement.

== Later years ==
In the Battle of Lugou Bridge, his 29th Army bore the brunt of the Japanese Kwantung Army. His troops were halved after the defeat and chased by the Japanese along the Jinpu Railway into Shandong Province during the Beiping–Hankou Railway Operation. However Han Fuqu, chairman of the province and suspected for his clandestine Japanese liaison, forbade Song to retreat across the Yellow River, resulting in the 29th Army being shattered at Shijiazhuang in December 1937 and January 1938. Remaining forces suffered various losses against the Imperial Japanese Army and were delegated to guerrilla combat after retreating into the mountainous regions at the borders of Henan and Shanxi province in February 1938.

He soon suffered various illnesses and died at the age of 54 in Mianyang County, Sichuan province after several unsuccessful medical treatments in Guilin, Chongqing, and Chengdu.

== See also ==
- History of the Republic of China
