= Incidents in interwar Japan =

Military and politics-related euphemism

During the interwar period in Japan, "incident" (Japanese: 事件, Hepburn: Jiken) became a common euphemism for wars, coups, and other events of a politically sensitive or sensational nature. Using "incident" rather than more specific terms allowed Japanese journalists to maintain the appearance of neutrality while avoiding potential censorship. Prominent examples include the "Manchurian Incident" (the invasion of Manchuria), the "China Incident" (the Second Sino-Japanese War), and the "Nanjing Incident" (the Nanjing Massacre).

== Explanation ==
Historian Sarah C. M. Paine gave the following explanation for the frequent usage of "incident":

The Japanese call these turning points "incidents," and the Chinese have adopted this nomenclature. They range from strikes to coup attempts, to assassinations, to regional wars. The word usage suggests a fork in the road and a choice that forever forecloses certain alternatives. Generally, such incidents are named by date or place, as if to absolve human beings of any responsibility for them.

This vague and abstract manner of describing events had its roots in the peculiar form of self-censorship common in the Japanese media of the time. During the rice riots of 1918, a newspaper named the Ōsaka Asahi shinbun had run an editorial criticizing press censorship directed against journalists reporting on the riots. The government responded by threatening to shut down the paper and the Ōsaka Asahi eventually issued an apology. That event, together with the attitude that taking a firm political stance was "civically unworthy partisanship", led most newspapers in Japan to maintain a strict "impartial and non-partisan" editorial line. Another factor encouraging the use of the vague language was the lack of information that the Japanese media had on the details of events as they occurred. In the immediate aftermath of the February 26 incident, for example, the government declared a total blackout of information to the press. (Note: Quoted from Ariyama Teruo, 2004)

Despite the general air of self-censorship, some Japanese journalists commented on the euphemistic naming of major events. In the political debate that followed the assassination of Zhang Zuolin by two Kwantung Army officers, the Tokyo Nichi Nichi Shimbun wrote:

Despite the fact that the incident in question quite clearly refers to the assassination of Zhang Zuolin, it is labeled "a certain grave incident," and the like. This in itself seems to suggest that there are already grave suspicions against our nation and it is to no small extent giving rise to disadvantageous implications for Japan's foreign affairs.

== List of "incidents" ==
Event	Date	Description
Nikolayevsk incident	March – June 1920	
Hunchun Incident	2 October 1920	According to contemporary Japanese reports, the Japanese consulate in the Chinese city of Hunchun was attacked and burned to the ground by the Korean Independence Army, who also killed thirteen Japanese. Historians are unsure whether this account was accurate, but the Japanese government used the attack to justify escalated military intervention in Manchuria.
Kantō incident	October 1920 – April 1921	Known in English as the Gando Massacre, the massacre lasted three weeks following the Hunchun Incident. Imperial Japanese Army (IJA) soldiers murdered at least 5,000 Korean civilians and committed numerous acts of rape.
Fukuda Village Incident	September 6, 1923	Immediately after the destructive Great Kantō Earthquake, rumors emerged that ethnic Koreans were planning to commit crimes across Japan. The rumors led to a series of massacres against Koreans and Japanese political dissents across Japan. The Fukuda Village Incident was the largest of these, in which a lynch mob murdered nine traveling merchants mistakenly identified as Koreans.
Amakasu Incident	September 16, 1923	Also part of the Kantō Massacre, this incident refers the Japanese military police's murder of two prominent anarchists and their young nephew.
Nanjing incident	March 21–27, 1927	As the Northern Expedition swept through southern China, popular anger at foreigners boiled over into riots. In Nanjing, foreign warships (including some from the Imperial Japanese Navy) bombarded the city to defend foreign residents against rioting and looting.
Hankou incident	3 April 1927	Rioting Chinese workers and a few National Revolutionary Army (NRA) units entered the Japanese concession in the city of Hankou, engaged in vandalism and looting, and attacked Japanese residents and consular staff. A number of servicemen of the Imperial Japanese Navy were injured, 150 homes were damaged and the total cost of the destruction was estimated at 920,000 yen. Japanese marines opened fire on the protestors and killed dozens of Chinese civilians.
A Certain Grave Incident in Manchuria	4 June 1928	Known more widely as the Huanggutun incident, this was the assassination of Chinese warlord Zhang Zuolin by two Kwantung Army officers. At the time, the Japanese media also referred to the event as the "Zhang Zuolin Explosion Death Incident" (Japanese: 張作霖爆殺事件, Hepburn: Chōsakurin bakusatsu jiken) or simply the "Manchurian incident". The latter name fell out of use after it started being used for the much more famous 1931 Japanese invasion of Manchuria.
Chinese Eastern Railway Incident	1929	It is better known in English as the Sino-Soviet conflict of 1929. In 1929, the Chinese Northeastern Army seized full control of the Chinese Eastern Railway which had been jointly administered by China and the Soviet Union. The Soviets responded by sending a large military force into China that forcefully reestablished the status quo ante bellum. (Note: For the usage of the name "East Chinese Railway Incident", see Sankei Shimbun (1976). 蔣介石秘録 8 日本帝国の陰謀 [Chiang Kai-shek's Secret Records Volume 8: The Conspiracy of the Japanese Empire] (in Japanese). Sankei Publishing. p. 128.; For details on the event itself, see Walker, Michael (2017). The 1929 Sino-Soviet War. Lawrence, Kansas: University Press of Kansas.)
Jinan incident	3–11 May 1928	Similar to the Nanjing and Hankou incidents that had taken place the previous year, this was a conflict touched off by the capture of a Chinese city by the NRA's Northern Expedition. A dispute between NRA and IJA soldiers led to the deaths of 13–16 Japanese civilians, which in turn caused a conflict between the two armies that left thousands of casualties on the NRA side. The NRA fled the area to continue northwards toward Beijing, and Jinan remained under Japanese occupation until March 1929.
Musha Incident	27 October – December 1930	The Seediq, an ethnic group indigenous to Taiwan, launched a rebellion against Japanese rule on the island. The Japanese authorities brutally repressed the uprising.
Nakamura incident	27 June 1931	The Northeastern Army arrested and summarily executed four Japanese nationals (including an IJA officer) traveling through Manchuria, on the charge that they were carrying narcotics for non-medical purposes. Although it occurred before the Wanpaoshan incident (see below), it only became public knowledge in Japan on August 17. It led to further straining of relations between Japan and China on the eve of the Japanese invasion of Manchuria.
Manpozan Incident	1 July 1931	Known in English as the Wanpaoshan Incident, this was a minor dispute between Chinese and Korean farmers along the border between China and Japanese-occupied Korea. Through a series of false reports, the issue was highly sensationalized in the Imperial Japanese and Korean press, and used for considerable propaganda effect to increase anti-Chinese sentiment in the Empire of Japan prior to the Japanese invasion of Manchuria.
Mukden incident	1931	Also called the Manchurian incident, Liutiaoukou incident or September 18 incident, a staged sabotage of a South Manchuria Railway track that led to the Japanese invasion of Manchuria. Japanese government officials argued that the invasion was not a war, so referred to it as an "incident". This language was adopted in the United States as well to avoid the Neutrality Acts' prohibition on selling arms to belligerent powers (the United States government wanted to sell arms to China)
Tientsin incident	1931	Not to be confused with the 1939 incident of the same name, this was a riot in Tianjin fomented by Col. Kenji Doihara to provide cover for the removal of Puyi to Manchuria. The Japanese had chosen to make Puyi the figurehead of their new puppet government in Manchuria.
March incident	March 1931	The March incident was a failed coup attempt by the Sakurakai, a secret society of extreme militarists in the IJA. Their goal was to elevate General Kazushige Ugaki to the post of prime minister. After their initial plan failed, the plotters reached out to Ugaki for military support and were rebuffed. Ugaki did help cover up the affair and ensured that the plotters received very mild punishments.
October incident	October 1931	Also known as the Imperial Colors incident. The Sakurakai society decided to try again to install a military government, this time to be headed by General Sadao Araki. Details about the plot leaked to government officials, and the plotters were arrested on 17 October 1931. The coup led a moderate coalition government to take power that attempted to reassert government control of the army. However, the lightness of the punishments for the plotters only encouraged more attempted military intervention in the government, cumulating with the February 26 Incident of 1936.
Shanghai incident	January 28 – March 3, 1932	In order to divert attention from the creation of Manchukuo and to increase its influence in Shanghai, Japan deliberately provoked anti-Japanese riots in the Shanghai International Settlement. It used the riots as a pretext for stationing troops in Shanghai. On January 28, these troops engaged the Chinese 19th Route Army. Heavy fighting continued for weeks until a truce was finally arranged on May 5.
League of Blood incident	1932	A secret civilian ultranationalist society led by Nisshō Inoue attempted to assassinate twenty wealthy businessmen and liberal politicians. They only succeeded in killing only two: former Finance Minister Junnosuke Inoue and the Director-General of the Mitsui Holding Company, Dan Takuma.
May 15 incident	May 15, 1932	The May 15 incident was another failed coup, this time led by radical militarists in the Navy. 11 young naval officers assassinated Prime Minister Inukai Tsuyoshi. The following trial and popular support of the Japanese population led to extremely light sentences for the assassins, strengthening the rising power of Japanese militarism and weakening democracy and the rule of law in the Empire of Japan.
Mount Mihara Incident	1933	Two homosexual students attempted a double suicide by jumping into the volcano of Mount Mihara.
Military Academy incident	November 1934	In January 1934 the Tōseiha ("Control Faction") of the Japanese military solidified its influence over the government by dismissing a prominent supporter of the rival Imperial Way Faction, Sadao Araki. Supporters of the Imperial Way plotted to launch a coup d'etat. One of the conspirators revealed the plan and the plotters were arrested by the Kempeitai (military police). However, they were let off with light sentences.
North Chahar incident	June 1935	A minor dispute between Chinese soldiers and a group of traveling Japanese soldiers over travel permits led to an official diplomatic complaint by the local Japanese Consul. Subsequent negotiations between the Kwangtung Army and Chinese 29th Army led to the Qin-Doihara Agreement.
Aizawa incident	12 August 1935	Lt. Colonel Saburō Aizawa, a leader of the Imperial Way Faction, assassinated Tetsuzan Nagata as revenge for the purge of Imperial Way sympathizer Jinzaburō Masaki.
February 26 incident	26–29 February 1936	The remaining supporters of the Imperial Way Faction, hoping to reverse the gains that the Tōseiha had made over the previous two years, attempted a coup. Although they assassinated several leading officials and seized a number of important government buildings in Tokyo, they failed to assassinate Prime Minister Keisuke Okada or secure control of the Imperial Palace. Their supporters in the army made attempts to capitalize on their actions, but divisions within the military, combined with Imperial anger at the coup, meant they were unable to achieve a change of government. Facing overwhelming opposition as the army moved against them, the rebels surrendered on 29 February. Nineteen of the Imperial Way's leaders were executed for leading the uprising, while another forty were imprisoned. Under the undisputed leadership of the Tōseiha faction, the military would go on to increase its control over the civilian government.
May 18 Incident	1936	Geisha Sada Abe accidentally murdered her lover, Kichizō Ishida, via strangulation before cutting off his genitals and carrying them around with her in her kimono. In a reference to the February 26 Incident or "Ni Ni-Roku Incident", the crime was satirically dubbed the "Go Ichi-Hachi" Incident ("5–18" or "May 18").
Suiyuan Incident	1936	An attempt by the Inner Mongolian Army and Grand Han Righteous Army, two forces founded and supported by Japan, to take control of the Suiyuan province from China. The attempted invasion occurred in 1936, shortly before the Second Sino-Japanese War. The Japanese government denied taking part in the operation, but the Inner Mongolians and the other collaborationist Chinese troops received air support from Japanese planes and were assisted by the IJA. The entire operation was overseen by Japanese staff officers. The campaign was unsuccessful, mostly due to lack of training and low morale among the Mongolians and other collaborators. The defense of Suiyuan, one of the first major successes of China's NRA over Japanese-supported forces, greatly improved Chinese morale.
China incident	July 7, 1937	Used to refer both to the Marco Polo Bridge Incident that started the Second Sino-Japanese War as well as the war itself.
Langfang incident	1937	
Guanganmen incident	1937	
Tongzhou incident	1937	
Nanjing incident	1937	A massacre of Chinese soldiers in civilians in the city of Nanjing after the city was captured by the Japanese. The phrase "Nanjing incident" was used after the war by deniers of the atrocity.
Panay incident	12 December 1937	Japanese air attack against American river patrol boat on the Yangtze
Tsuyama incident	21 May 1938	
Zhanggufeng incident	July – August, 1938	
Kweilin incident	1938	CNAC Chinese airline plane shot down by Japanese fighters over Pearl river
Tientsin incident	1939	
Nomonhan Incident	May – September, 1939	
Tutuila incident	31 July 1941	Japanese air strike against an American river patrol boat in Chongqing
Kyūjō incident (8-15 Incident)	1945	
