= Politics of the Empire of Japan (1914–1944) =

The political situation in Japan (1914–44) dealt with the realities of the two World Wars and their effect on Japanese national policy.

== Japanese policy from 1914 to 1918 ==
Since the Meiji Period, Japan had been a constitutional monarchy. However, the name did not obscure the fact that Japan's form of government was more akin to an aristocratic oligarchy.

In World War I, Japan fought alongside the Allied Powers. In 1915, Japan presented their Twenty-One Demands to China. The demands used the war as a pretense for gaining additional territorial holdings in China. When the United States entered the war in 1917, Japan signed the Lansing–Ishii Agreement, which prevented interference with the Open Door Policy that allowed all nations to engage in commerce with China. With the allied victory over the Central Powers, Japan gained many German possessions in China, including the Shandong Peninsula. Japan also received the South Seas Mandate from the League of Nations (a precursor to the United Nations) and also actively used the mandate to gain control over various islands in the South Pacific. Japan used economic development and immigration to push their expansionary goals as an empire.

== Japanese policy from 1919 to 1927 ==
This period of time is widely known as the "reconciliation period," during which great riots occurred (e.g., the Rice Revolution of 1918–19), menacing the dominion of government gangs.

In 1918, Hara Takashi, the leader of the conservative party Seiyūkai, assumed the position of Prime Minister. He was the first person of modest origins to take this role, and his success was taken as a good sign by Western observers. His success ultimately diminished the power of the feudal government's elder statesmen (Genro) and military leaders. The 1920 elections supported Hara, but Hara was assassinated by a fanatic on 4 November 1921. His Finance Minister Takahashi Korekiyo was then made party president and Prime Minister, serving for seven months before resigning. Two Genro members then dictated the election of Admiral Katō Tomosaburō as the new Prime Minister.

Kato represented Japan at the Washington Naval Conference (1921–1922), at which the Allied powers made an agreement fixing the proportional number of battleships that each could possess: five for the United States, five for England, and three for Japan. The Allies compensated Japan with a four-power pact, giving Japan the right of unlimited land armaments without restrictions and protection against Western intervention in East Asia. Kato's program strictly followed the Washington accords, which meant a guarantee of unrestrained Japanese action in the East at the expense of a relatively inferior naval position.

Kato's death in 1923, followed by a terrible earthquake that devastated Japan in the same year, made a necessary reorganization and reconstruction of the nation's damaged economy. At this time, one independent party was formed while the following governments included moderate elements. But in 1927, this short liberal period ended when Baron Giichi Tanaka—leader of the Seiyūkai, a minority party in the Diet—rose to power.

The Imperial Japanese Army was impatient for control of the Diet while the political class was anxious to gain power over industrial expansion; previously, the rotation of parties in power had permitted each party a turn at benefiting from generous contracts and corruption, leading to an informal accord between them. A whole sequence of scandals, however, led to an appreciation of the Imperial Army's National Feudal Honour Code (Bushi-Do, the War Code), as a bulwark against the fraudulent politics of the traditional parties.

== The Road to Imperialism in Japan: 1927 to 1931 ==
The more moderate elements, meeting to form the Minseito democratic party, presented a challenge to the military. In 1930, the Minseito Party obtained a decisive majority in the Diet: 273, against 174 for the military followers. Minseito fielded two prime ministers, Osachi Hamaguchi, who was already serving as prime minister since July 2, 1929, and Wakatsuki Reijiro, who took over after Hamaguchi retired due to wounds from an assassination attempt (which occurred earlier on 14 November 1930). Wakatsuki retired on 13 December 1931 after he could no longer control the army in Manchuria. The Seiyukai Party then took control, installing Inukai Tsuyoshi as Prime Minister.

The world situation remained unsettled, causing some effects in Japan, which remained in a heavy-industrial crisis. Needing to display some drastic action, the military decided to invade Manchuria. One of the military's principal motives was to eliminate the rising spirit of social criticism and insecurity. In 1925, universal suffrage for men was granted, which led to the formation of the Laborists and the Peasant Party. There were more liberals and radicals in the universities. Very few of them accepted the religious myth about the Mikado as the descendant of eternal ages of Amaterasu Omikami and the religious paraphernalia related to Emperor worship. These Japanese were more modern in their viewpoints on the economy, politics, science, and Western ideas; the militarists and their supporters said they upheld "pernicious and dangerous ideas."

In reality, power passed to General Sadao Araki, a military man with feudal ideas profoundly hostile to Western civilization. During his administration, the police reprisals and prosecutions of independent and advanced thinkers were reminiscent of the days of Tsarism in Imperial Russia. A large proportion of the intellectual class was detained while books and newspapers were reduced to the authoritarian formula.

At the same time in 1931, with some guerrilla opposition, the Japanese conquest of Manchuria succeeded without difficulties. Later, this success and the collapse of organized resistance gained much sympathy for the reactionaries and Nationalists, and in the next elections they defeated the moderates by a majority of two to one.

In a display of political mockery of the Chinese Kuomintang revolution, Japan installed the last Manchu emperor of China, Puyi, as the regent for Manchukuo. China reported what they saw as "Japanese aggression" to the League of Nations. The report of the Lytton Commission created to investigate the incident condemned the Japanese action in Manchuria, motivating the Japanese to declare Manchukuo "independent". The report declared that Manchukuo remained part of China, but several other countries granted it diplomatic recognition as an independent state before World War II. In February 1933, when the findings of the Report were announced, the Japanese delegation walked out of the League of Nations; Japan gave formal notice of its withdrawal on March 27, 1933.

The real drivers of this movement were the generals of the Autonomous Kwantung Army. They applied pressure to have the oldest diplomat in Japan, Prince Saionji, nominated to the Inukai. In the wake of the electoral triumph a wave of political assassinations plagued the nation, aimed largely at ministers still in the cabinet who displayed some independence. In March 1932 ex-minister Inouye and Baron Takuma Dan, a leader of the banking interest Mitsui and one of the most powerful financial figures in Japan, were killed by shooting. These crimes were actions of the Brotherhood of Blood League, formed by a fanatical lieutenant and a Buddhist priest. This and other secret groups, particularly the Black Dragon Society of Mitsuru Toyama, were attractive to the sons of discarded citizens, small merchants and industrialists left to ruin by the great zaibatsus. Their embittered descendants became the backbone of the Japanese Army, many of their officers being of lower rank than the Zaibatsu families. This Radical movement took its ideas from Fascism, combined with right wing socialist elements. It hated the plutocracy but believed in rights for labor and a severely militarized state with strong controls over commercial monopolies and a hierarchical system, leading to the imperial conquest of vast new territories, providing wealth and successful careers for its members. The Assassins of the Brotherhood of Blood are aided, and receiving only some cases. The terror reached its highest point with the assassination of the leader of the Seiyukai, Prime Minister Inukai. This caused industrial concentration and supported monopolies, which raised large sums from loans to obtain the resources for factories and military industries, which rationalized their processes to reduce the low costs of Japanese production.

However, the farming situation still continued to be in danger. The taxes on peasants increased significantly while industrialists received economic bonuses. To prevent open rebellion in rural areas, the government allowed some 5,500,000 farmers to organize farming cooperatives as a method of containing their resentment.

The Choshu Clan dominated the Army and Satsuma managed the Navy. The unique form of reconciling the claims of older members of Choshu Clan with new elements of the new clan are extended the imperialists conquests in form. But the raising of nationalist consciousness in China and one perspective of united and patriotic China, appearing how one serious menace to any expansion why the militarists and ind considered important.

== Russian-Japanese successes: 1929–39 ==
The Soviet Union was frequently provoked by the Japanese from 1929 to 1939, but most particularly since 1931 when the Japanese conquered Manchuria. During the 1929 successes, the Japanese blocked the China Eastern Railway en route to Vladivostok. In 1935, the Russians sold this railway to Japan.

Then the Soviets raised an industrial center east of Lake Baikal, to augment the railways to Pacific areas. The Soviets also defeated the Japanese in various frontier skirmishes (1929–39). The Russians had an autonomous army in the far east for safeguarding their territory against the Kwantung Army.

== Japanese pressures over China: 1932–37 ==
In 1932, Admiral Saitō Makoto and War Minister General Araki formed one government with no political parties. Admiral Keisuke Okada succeeded Saito as Prime Minister, continuing the revocation of moderate policy in 1920 when they denounced the then-unpopular Washington Naval Treaty.

The Japanese continued to increase their diplomatic pressures over China. The Emperor of Manchukuo gave Henry Puyi the title of Kang Ten; and commenced their advance in North China, threatening Peking and Tientsin. Hostilities began in 1932, with one attack on Shanghai, but the Tanggu Truce (1933) between Japan and China fixed a demilitarized zone at the south of the Great Wall were the Chinese prohibited stationed troops.

In 1934, the Japanese challenged China with a sovereign demand over North China, which included Japanese advisers in the Chinese central government. With these successes, the Japanese government called for general elections in 1936. Despite strong police suppression of "dangerous ideas," the most moderate party, Minseito, defeated the government with a vote of 205 to 124, and they also gained support from the Labor party. The extremist Militarist party, supported by the Fascists, elected 20 members, or 15% of Diet.

Six days after the elections, there was a wave of political assassinations in Japan. Among the victims were Admiral Saito, Viscount Takahashi, General Jōtarō Watanabe. Prime Minister Okada was saved when one of the assassins confused him for another person. The Emperor was alarmed at the magnitude of these actions.

The army, concerned about losing control, reorganized itself. Kōki Hirota became Prime Minister, but the Army controlled the War Ministerium. Hirota knew why the Chinese situation would wait no longer. The Manchukuo disillusionment over the economical needs of Japan, still with their railway developed, establishing petrol and coal monopolies and some intents of colonization, the Japanese buying of Soviet Russia of East Chinese Railway, and other developments. But the double way in Soviet line in the Trans-Siberian Railway, and industrial expansion in the Far East and Siberia meant Japan had to go into debt in order to maintain a presence on the Russian frontier.

The fight against "bandits" had a cost in money and lives, maintain for all these country in virtual disorder situation how times of the "warlord" Zhang Zuolin before at 1928. Diplomatic pressures of Prime Minister Hirota over China caused the Militarists to overthrow him in 1936.

== Chinese–Japanese conflict and Axis coalition: 1937–41 ==
Japan signed the Anti-Comintern Pact in November 1936, becoming an ally of Germany. The treaty, a provocation to the Soviets, added to a number of incidents between Japan and Russia and Senjūrō Hayashi formed a right-wing government. In the 1937 elections, the Japanese electorate indicated its opposition to expansionism. The government then abolished elections, and Fumimaro Konoe formed a government on May 31, 1937.

In July 1937 Prime Minister Konoe began open hostilities against China which escalated into a full-scale, undeclared war the following month. The Japanese called it the "Chinese Incident" to downplay their invasion. In October 1937, Konoe approved the National Mobilization Law.

Since 1935, Japanese leaders had declared the country's intention to establish "a new order in Asia". China wanted to replace Chiang Kai-shek, and Western interests wanted the Soviets to retreat west of Lake Baikal. The Japanese government and the military proposed the Greater East Asia Co-Prosperity Sphere. Despite efforts to "put ... the aggressor in quarantine" (as Franklin D. Roosevelt said in Chicago in October 1937), the USS Panay (an American river-patrol boat) was deliberately sunk by Japanese Navy dive bombers in the Yangtze River (1938).

Two Japanese incursions were made into Soviet territory during the spring of 1938 and 1939: the Battle of Lake Khasan and the Manchurian-Mongolian; both were Japanese defeats. More right-wing activity began when Hiranuma Kiichirō became prime minister and the August 23, 1939 Molotov–Ribbentrop Pact rattled Japanese diplomacy. Nobuyuki Abe became prime minister, and the United States denounced the defunct Anglo-Japanese Alliance. Mitsumasa Yonai succeeded Abe as prime minister. In turn, Fumimaro Konoe succeeded Yonai as prime minister and formed a totalitarian, right-wing government in July 1940.

On September 27, 1940 Japan signed the Tripartite Pact, primarily directed against the United States. Foreign Minister Yōsuke Matsuoka, who withdrew Japan from the League of Nations in 1933, engineered the April 13, 1941 Soviet–Japanese Neutrality Pact. Special envoy Saburō Kurusu and Japanese ambassador to the United States Kichisaburō Nomura attempted to negotiate peace in Washington weeks before the December 7, 1941 attack on Pearl Harbor. The Japanese were initially successful in the Pacific and Southeast Asia, sinking the Royal Navy's Prince of Wales and the Repulse three days after Pearl Harbor, invading the Philippines, the Dutch East Indies, Malaya and Burma and threatening northern Australia and eastern India. Hideki Tojo had become prime minister on October 17, 1941; before his replacement by Kuniaki Koiso on July 22, 1944 the war had turned against Japan in the summer of 1943, except for some aspects of the Chinese campaign.

== Bibliography ==
- Jansen, Marius B. (2002). The Making of Modern Japan. Cambridge: Harvard University Press. ISBN 0-674-00991-6.
- Jansen, Marius B.; John Whitney Hall; Madoka Kanai; Denis Twitchett (1989). The Cambridge History of Japan. Cambridge University Press. ISBN 0-521-22356-3.
- Porter, Robert P. (2001). Japan: The Rise of a Modern Power. Adamant Media Corporation. ISBN 1-4021-9690-3.
