= Katsuma Dan =

Japanese embryologist and cell biologist

- 團 勝磨
- Born: October 16, 1904; Tokyo
- Died: May 18, 1996 (aged 91)
- Occupation: embryologist
- Relatives: Takuma Dan (father), Inou Dan (brother), Ikuma Dan (nephew)

Katsuma Dan (團 勝磨, Dan Katsuma; October 16, 1904 – May 18, 1996) was a Japanese embryologist and cell biologist. He was born in 1904 in Tokyo, the youngest son of Baron Dan Takuma, president of the Mitsui Gomei Kaisha Corporation. Takuma Dan was educated in the United States, graduating from MIT in 1878. He was one of the first foreign students to be educated at MIT and later, as president of the Japan Steel Works, he initiated and maintained close research ties with The Institute.

After receiving his undergraduate degree in Japan, Katsuma Dan also came to the United States where he studied embryology with Prof. L.V. Heilbrunn at the University of Pennsylvania. In addition Dan worked and studied at the Marine Biological Laboratory at Woods Hole (MBL) from 1931 to 1934, and later in 1936. It was here that he met his future wife (and longtime scientific collaborator) Jean M. Clark. Clark, who was also a student of Heilbrunn's, studied fertilization in marine invertebrates. The couple raised five children. They also maintained lasting ties to the MBL and returned often in later years as summer researchers and lecturers in embryology.

In March 1932, while Dan was studying at the MBL, his father was assassinated in Japan by ultra-nationalist radicals in the 'League of Blood Incident'. Katsuma Dan returned to Japan in the late 1930s and worked at the Misaki Marine Biological Station in Morioso Bay. He and his students maintained a remarkable degree of scientific productivity during World War II. His spirit is reflected in a letter written after the war to a friend in the United States: “...ducking under bombs was not so bad. Rather it was a great excitement. Hide and seek at the expense of your life can't help being exciting. There was, however, an awful side to it too.” Near the end of the war the Japanese Navy took over the Misaki Marine Station and converted it into a base for miniature submarines. Although displaced, Dan and his students set up a crude laboratory nearby and continued their work. At the end of the war Dan posted a hand-written note on the door of Misaki, addressed to advancing US forces, in which he said: “... you can destroy the weapons and the war instruments but save the civil equipments [sic] for the Japanese students. When you are through with your job here notify to the university [sic] and let us come back to our scientific home.” The note was signed, “The last one to go.” The obvious humanity and the mention of American marine biological laboratories appealed to a US Naval officer who passed the note on to the MBL. It was later published in Time Magazine under the headline, “Appeal to the Goths”.

Dan's scientific work focused on using marine invertebrates as model organisms to study fundamental questions in cell biology and embryonic development. He and his students focused on direct observation of cell behavior using light microscopy and discovered many of the fundamental aspects of fertilization, development, and morphogenesis (e.g., Dan and Okazaki, 1956). To settle a long-standing debate over the existence of the mitotic spindle, he encouraged his student, Shinya Inoué, to construct polarized light microscopes and look for evidence of organized polymer networks in living cells. And, together with Daniel Mazia, he was the first to isolate the mitotic apparatus and subject it to biochemical study. This work demonstrated conclusively the existence of the mitotic spindle and initiated the modern biochemical study of mitosis.

Dan and his students also developed methods for measuring small, local movements of the cell surface during division. This enabled detailed, quantitative studies of the process of cell cleavage (cytokinesis). Based on this work, Dan proposed the novel idea that cell cleavage is driven directly by elongation of the mitotic spindle. That is, the spindle itself attaches to the cell surface via 'astral rays' (microtubules) and physically draws in the cleavage furrow (Dan, 1943). Subsequent work indicated that cleavage is actually driven by contraction of an actin filament network in the cortex rather than by expansion of the spindle but this idea was the forerunner of the current view of cytokinesis, in which interaction of spindle microtubules with the cell cortex determines the position of the cleavage furrow.

Katsuma Dan was professor of zoology at the Tokyo Metropolitan University from 1949-1968. He also served as president of the university from 1964 until his retirement in 1972. Dan was president of both the Zoological Society of Japan and the Japanese Society of Developmental biologists. In 1976 he received the Second Order Imperial Medal, and in 1987 he received the Emperor's Award for Cultural Merit. A fellowship honoring Katsuma and Jean Clark Dan was established in 1979 for cultural exchange between the United States and Japan.

Katsuma Dan died in 1996 in Osaka, Japan, at the age of 91.

== Sources ==
- Obituary, Falmouth Enterprise, May 24, 1996.
- Schneider, M. (Personal Communication) MBL/WHOI Archives, Woods Hole MA.
- Inoue, S. (1989) Achievements of Professor Katsuma Dan. MBL/WHOI Archives, Woods Hole MA.
- Ewick, D. 2003. Untitled note. Japanisme, Orientalism, Modernism: An archive of Japan in English-language verse.
