= Jean Clark Dan =

American Biologist (1910–1978)

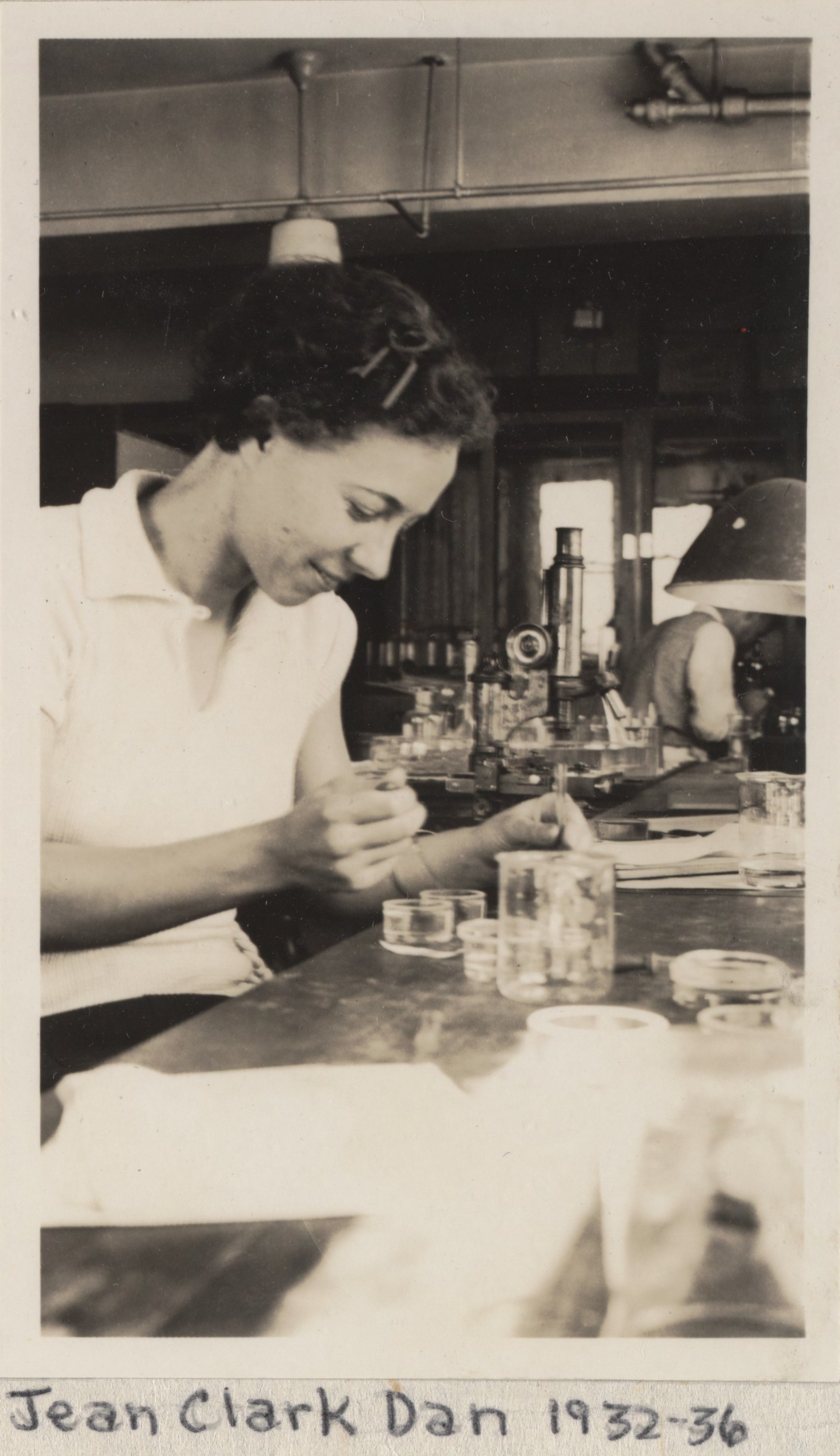
Dan at the Marine Biological Laboratory

Jean Clark Dan née Clark (May 20, 1910 – November 13, 1978) was an American embryologist who pioneered research into the acrosomal reaction. Born in 1910 to a family of staunch Presbyterians in Westfield, New Jersey, Jean Clark Dan graduated from Wilson College in Pennsylvania in 1932 where she studied biology. She pursued her graduate studies in invertebrate zoology at the University of Pennsylvania and spent her summers at the Marine Biological Laboratory in Woods Hole, Massachusetts. At the Marine Biological Laboratory she met her future husband and scientific collaborator Katsuma Dan, the son of a prominent Japanese statesman. They were engaged in 1934, the same year that Katsuma Dan received his PhD. Jean received her PhD in 1936 and she and Katsuma were married that same year. Jean and Katsuma then moved to Japan where they continued their research at the Misaki Marine Biological Station of Tokyo University.

Located 40 miles from Tokyo, the first three years of World War II limited the supplies available to the Dans. In 1945, the Misaki Marine Station was taken over by the Japanese military for use as a midget submarine base. This forced Jean and her colleagues to relocate to temporary facilities. Jean and Katsuma also raised their five children during the war. After the war, while Katsuma restarted work at Misaki, Jean moved with her children to Nagai. Here she negotiated with the occupying U.S. forces to return land that had been seized by the Japanese military to local farmers. She also negotiated to use garbage from the U.S. army to rehabilitate Japanese villages. Because of this work to improve local living conditions she was nicknamed the “God of Nagai”.

Jean Clark Dan returned to the United States and the Marine Biological institute in a 1947 visit. Through her network of scientific colleagues she acquired the first phase contrast microscope. She brought this microscope back to Japan as a gift for her husband who refused the gift, insisting that she use it to return to her research. Jean would use a combination of electron microscopy and optical microscopy in her research. Electron microscopy allows for a much higher resolution than optical microscopy but the methods used in specimen preparation kill the cells under observation and can introduce artifacts. By combining these two types of microscopy along with electron photography Jean was able to make and document detailed qualitative observations about the process of fertilization in invertebrates. Both of Jean’s Studies on the Acrosome (the second being published in 1954) pioneered the use of the electron microscope and served as the basis for Jean’s initially disputed discovery of the acrosomal reaction. The acrosomal reaction is now recognized as a crucial part of the fertilization process in marine invertebrates.

Throughout her research Jean Clark Dan won grants and fellowships from both the United States and Japan. She held an additional Japanese PhD, held a position on the editorial board of the Japanese journal Development Growth & Differentiation, and was recognized with an award by the Zoological Society of Japan in 1958.

In addition to her work as a researcher Jean Clark Dan also worked as an educator. She worked first as a lecturer then as a professor at Ochanomizu University. Eventually, in 1975, she became the director of Ochanomizu University’s Tateyama Marine Biological Station before retiring in 1976.

Jean also worked as a translator, translating the work of Japanese biologists into English for publication. She also translated the book Children of the A-Bomb and assisted in English translations of the publications of Emperor Hirohito.

Writing in her obituary for Nature, Arthur L. Colwin and Laura Hunter Colwin, who like Katsuma and Jean were a husband-wife team of embryonic researchers, described Jean on a personal level as a “warm and vital” woman, “a strong swimmer”, a fan of wild mushrooms and sweet potatoes, the owner of a dog and a “whole family of Siamese cats”, an enthusiastic idealist and educator, and the type of scientist who would decorate her laboratory with a flower in a beaker.

Jean Clark Dan died of asthma in Tateyama, Japan on November 13, 1978, at the age of 68.
