= Japanese War Crimes: Murder Under the Sun =

Historical film

Japanese War Crimes: Murder Under The Sun is a historical film about Japanese war crimes before and during World War II. It was shown on the History Channel.

According to Hulu, "Over 14 dreadful years between 1932 and 1945, Japan went on a rampage of war and atrocity beyond comprehension." This film goes into great detail about how American and many other Allied soldiers were treated during these war crimes. By the summer of 1942 the Japanese had taken over more than 320,000 allied prisoners. Interviews of prisoners of war in Japan were also featured in the film.

== See also ==
- Japanese militarism
