= DGD =

DGD can refer to:

- Di-Gata Defenders, a 52 episode Canadian cartoon series that ran from 2006 to 2008
- Dance Gavin Dance, a musical group
- Dworkin's Game Driver, a MUD server software platform
- Differential group delay, a term from optics
- Development, Growth & Differentiation, a scientific journal
