= Daniel Mazia =

American cell biologist (1912–1996)

- Born: December 18, 1912; Scranton, Pennsylvania
- Died: June 9, 1996 (aged 83); Monterey, California
- Education: University of Pennsylvania (Ph.D., 1937)
- Known for: Work in nuclear and cell physiology as well as mechanisms in mitosis
- Awards: E.B. Wilson Medal (1981)
- Scientific career
- Fields: Cell Biology; Nuclear and Cellular physiology
- Workplaces: University of Missouri (1938–1950); University of California, Berkeley (1951–1979); Stanford University

Daniel Mazia (December 18, 1912 – June 9, 1996) was an American cell biologist, best known for his research that isolated the cell structures responsible for mitosis. His research was the gateway for many later discoveries about the cell cycle, cell division, and many other areas in cell biology.

== Biography ==
Mazia grew up in Scranton, Pennsylvania, in a Russian-Jewish family. He earned a bachelor's degree in 1933 and a Ph.D. in 1937 from the University of Pennsylvania. In 1937–38, he was a National Research Council fellow at Princeton University and at the Marine Biological Laboratory at Woods Hole, Massachusetts. Here, he worked with sea urchins which were the organism he focused on in his doctoral research. He then joined the zoology faculty of the University of Missouri, where he taught from 1938 to 1950. During the first few months of his job there, he served in the United States Army throughout World War II. In 1938, he married Gertrude Greenblatt and had two children, Judith and Rebecca.

From 1951 until his retirement in 1979, he was a professor at the University of California, Berkeley, where he taught Physical Chemical Biology for much of his stint as a professor at Berkeley. Due to his profound research in Woods Hole, many graduate students as well as postdoctoral students flooded his laboratory in California.

After leaving Berkeley until his death in 1996, Mazia was an emeritus professor at Stanford University. He died of heart failure and complications due to cancer.

== Research ==
=== Isolating the mitotic spindle ===
Mazia's research focused mainly on processes of mitosis, and was the first to isolate a spindle apparatus from a cell undergoing cell division. This research was done in conjunction with Katsuma Dan where they completed the first successful isolation of a mitotic apparatus from sea urchin eggs. This was a discovery that shocked the cell biology community. This discovery ended doubt of what the apparatus looked like, as well as opened a variety of new questions about the makeup of the apparatus, and how the appearance and disappearance of the structure was controlled. He never lost interest in the apparatus, and continued to research it throughout his career.

=== Other Research ===
Mazia's doctoral research worked mainly with sea urchins, and focused on the calcium ions involved in cell regulation. He introduced many ideas about a free calcium during fertilisation, which linked the idea that redistributing Ca^{2+} ions help to activate the egg to form the offspring.

When he went to work with the University of Missouri, his research focused on the structure of the nucleus.

After his retirement from Berkeley, he went to work for Stanford University at the Hopkins Marine Station, where he researched the structure and replication of the centrosomal complex and proposed ideas as to how it might function as a regulator of cell structure.

Some other research was focused on the cell theory in which he concluded that the eukaryotic cell is a whole unit in which the structure contains the basic needs of living for any unit.

== Accomplishments ==
Mazia was a member of the National Academy of Sciences and a fellow of the American Academy of Arts and Sciences. He was awarded the E. B. Wilson Medal in 1981 for his contributions to cell biology along with George Emil Palade and Keith R. Porter.

== Quote ==
The gift of the great microscopist is the ability to think with the eyes and see with the brain

— Daniel Mazia

Excerpt from Daniel Mazia speech, Jan. 1996 (source for quote)
