= Japanese militarism =

Militaristic ideology espoused by the Empire of Japan (1873–1945)

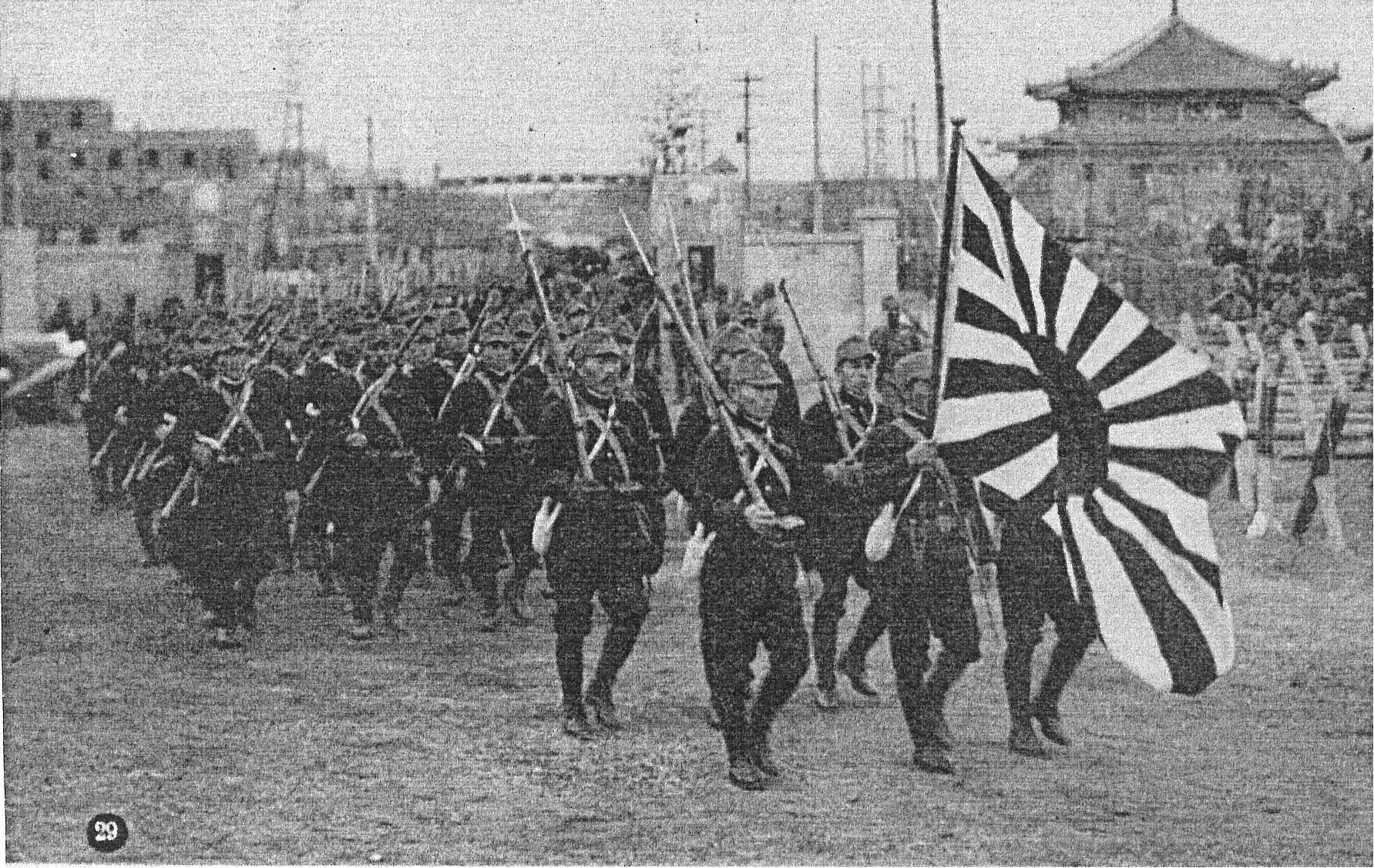
Imperial Japanese Navy land forces marching in occupied Nanking, 1937

Japanese militarism (日本軍国主義, Nihon gunkoku shugi) was the ideology in the Empire of Japan which advocated the belief that militarism should dominate the political and social life of the nation, and the belief that the strength of the military is equal to the strength of a nation. It was most prominent from the start of conscription after the Meiji Restoration until the Japanese defeat in World War II, roughly 1873 to 1945. Since then, pacifism has been enshrined in the postwar Constitution of Japan as one of its key tenets.

== History ==
=== Rise of militarism ===
The military had a very strong influence on Japanese society during the Meiji Restoration, starting in 1868, lasting until 1889. Almost all leaders in Japanese society during the Meiji period (whether in the military, politics or business) were ex-samurai or descendants of samurai, and shared a set of values and outlooks. The early Meiji government viewed Japan as threatened by western imperialism, and one of the prime motivations for the Fukoku Kyohei policy ("Enrich the Country, Strengthen the Armed Forces") was to strengthen Japan's economic and industrial foundations, so that a strong military could be built to defend Japan against outside powers.

The rise of universal military conscription, introduced by Yamagata Aritomo in 1873, along with the proclamation of the Imperial Rescript to Soldiers and Sailors in 1882, enabled the military to indoctrinate thousands of men from various social backgrounds with military-patriotic values and the concept of unquestioning loyalty to the Emperor as the basis of the Japanese state (kokutai). Yamagata, like many Japanese, was strongly influenced by the recent striking success of Prussia in transforming itself from an agricultural state to a leading modern industrial and military power. He accepted Prussian political ideas, which favored military expansion abroad and authoritarian government at home. The Prussian model also devalued the notion of civilian control over the independent military, which meant that in Japan, as in Germany, the military could develop into a state within a state, thus exercising greater influence on politics in general.

Following the German victory in the Franco-Prussian War, the Army Staff College and the Japanese General Staff paid close attention to Major Jakob Meckel's views on the superiority of the German military model over the French system as the reason for German victory. In response to a Japanese request, Prussian Chief of Staff Helmuth von Moltke sent Meckel to Japan to become an O-yatoi gaikokujin (foreign advisor). In Japan, Meckel worked closely with future prime ministers General Katsura Tarō and General Yamagata Aritomo, and with army strategist General Kawakami Soroku. Meckel made numerous recommendations which were implemented, including reorganization of the command structure of the army into divisions and regiments, thus increasing mobility, strengthening the army logistics and transportation structure with the major army bases connected by railways, establishing artillery and engineering regiments as independent commands, and revising the universal conscription system to abolish virtually all exceptions. A bust of Meckel was sited in front of the Japanese Army Staff College from 1909 through 1945.

Although his period in Japan (1885–1888) was relatively short, Meckel had a tremendous impact on the development of the Japanese military. He is credited with having introduced Clausewitz's military theories and the Prussian concept of war games (Kriegsspiel) in a process of refining tactics. By training some sixty of the highest-ranking Japanese officers of the time in tactics, strategy and organization, he was able to replace the previous influences of the French advisors with his own philosophies. Meckel especially reinforced Hermann Roesler's ideal of subservience to the Emperor, as expressly codified in Articles XI-XIII of the Meiji Constitution, by teaching his pupils that Prussian military success was a consequence of the officer class's unswerving loyalty to their sovereign Emperor.

The rise of political parties in the late Meiji period was coupled with the rise of secret and semi-secret patriotic societies, such as the Gen'yōsha (1881) and Kokuryukai (1901), which coupled political activities with paramilitary activities and military intelligence, and supported expansionism overseas as a solution to Japan's domestic issues. Japan felt looked down on by Western countries during the late 19th century. The phrase fukoku kyōhei (rich nation, strong army) was created during this time and shows how Japanese officials saw imperialism as the way to gain respect and power. With a more aggressive foreign policy, and victory over China in the First Sino-Japanese War and over Russia in the Russo-Japanese War, Japan joined the imperialist powers. The need for a strong military to secure Japan's new overseas empire was strengthened by a sense that only through a strong military would Japan earn the respect of western nations, and thus revision of the unequal treaties.

=== Economic factors ===
During the 19th century, Great Power status was considered dependent on resource-rich colonial empires, both as a source of raw materials for military and industrial production, and international prestige. Due to the lack of resources in Japanese home islands, raw materials such as iron, oil, and coal largely had to be imported. The success of Japan in securing Taiwan (1895) and Korea (1910) had brought Japan primarily agricultural colonies. In terms of resources, the Japanese military looked towards Manchuria's iron and coal, Indochina's rubber, and China's vast resources. However, the army was at variance with the zaibatsu financial and industrial corporations on how to manage economic expansion, a conflict also affecting domestic politics.

=== Independence of the military ===
Also forming part of the basis for the growth of militarism was the freedom from civilian control enjoyed by the Japanese armed forces. In 1878, the Imperial Japanese Army established the Imperial Japanese Army General Staff office, modelled after the German General Staff. This office was independent of, and equal (and later superior) to the Ministry of War of Japan in terms of authority. The Imperial Japanese Navy soon followed with the Imperial Japanese Navy General Staff. These General Staff offices were responsible for the planning and execution of military operations, and reported directly to the emperor. As the Chiefs of the General Staff were not cabinet ministers, they did not report to the Prime Minister of Japan, and were thus completely independent of any civilian oversight or control.

The Army and the Navy also had decisive say on the formation (and survival) of any civilian government. Since the law required that the posts of Army Minister and Navy Minister be filled by active-duty officers nominated by their respective services, and since the law also required that a prime minister resign if he could not fill all of his cabinet posts, both the Army and the Navy had final say on the formation of a cabinet, and could bring down the cabinet at any time by withdrawing their minister and refusing to nominate a successor. In reality, while this tactic was used only one time (ironically to prevent a general, Kazushige Ugaki, from becoming prime minister in 1937), the threat always loomed large when the military made any demands on the civilian leadership.

=== Expansionism ===
During the Taishō period, Japan saw a short period of democratic rule (the so-called "Taisho democracy"), and several diplomatic attempts were made to encourage peace, such as the Washington Naval Treaty and participation in the League of Nations. However, with the beginning of the Shōwa era, the apparent collapse of the world economic order with the Great Depression starting in 1929, coupled with the imposition of trade barriers by western nations and an increasing radicalism in Japanese politics including issues of domestic terrorist violence (including an assassination attempt on the emperor in 1932 and a number of attempted coups d'état by ultra-nationalist secret societies) led to a resurgence of so-called "jingoistic" patriotism, a weakening of democratic forces and a belief that the military could solve all threats both domestic and foreign. Patriotic education also strengthened the sense of a hakko ichiu, or a divine mission to unify Asia under Japanese rule.

Those who continued to resist the "military solution" including nationalists with unquestionable patriotism, such as generals Jotaro Watanabe and Tetsuzan Nagata and ex-Foreign Minister Kijūrō Shidehara were driven from office or an active role in the government. A turning point came with the ratification of the London Naval Treaty of 1930. Prime Minister Osachi Hamaguchi and his Minseito party agreed to a treaty which would severely limit Japanese naval power. This treaty was strongly opposed by the military, who claimed that it would endanger national defense, and was portrayed by the opposition Rikken Seiyukai party as having been forced upon Japan by a hostile United States, which further inflamed growing anti-foreign sentiment. The Japanese system of party government finally met its demise with the May 15 Incident in 1932, when a group of junior naval officers and army cadets assassinated Prime Minister Inukai Tsuyoshi. Although the assassins were put on trial and sentenced to fifteen years' imprisonment, they were seen popularly as having acted out of patriotism and the atmosphere was set where the military was able to act with little restraint.

=== Growth of military adventurism ===
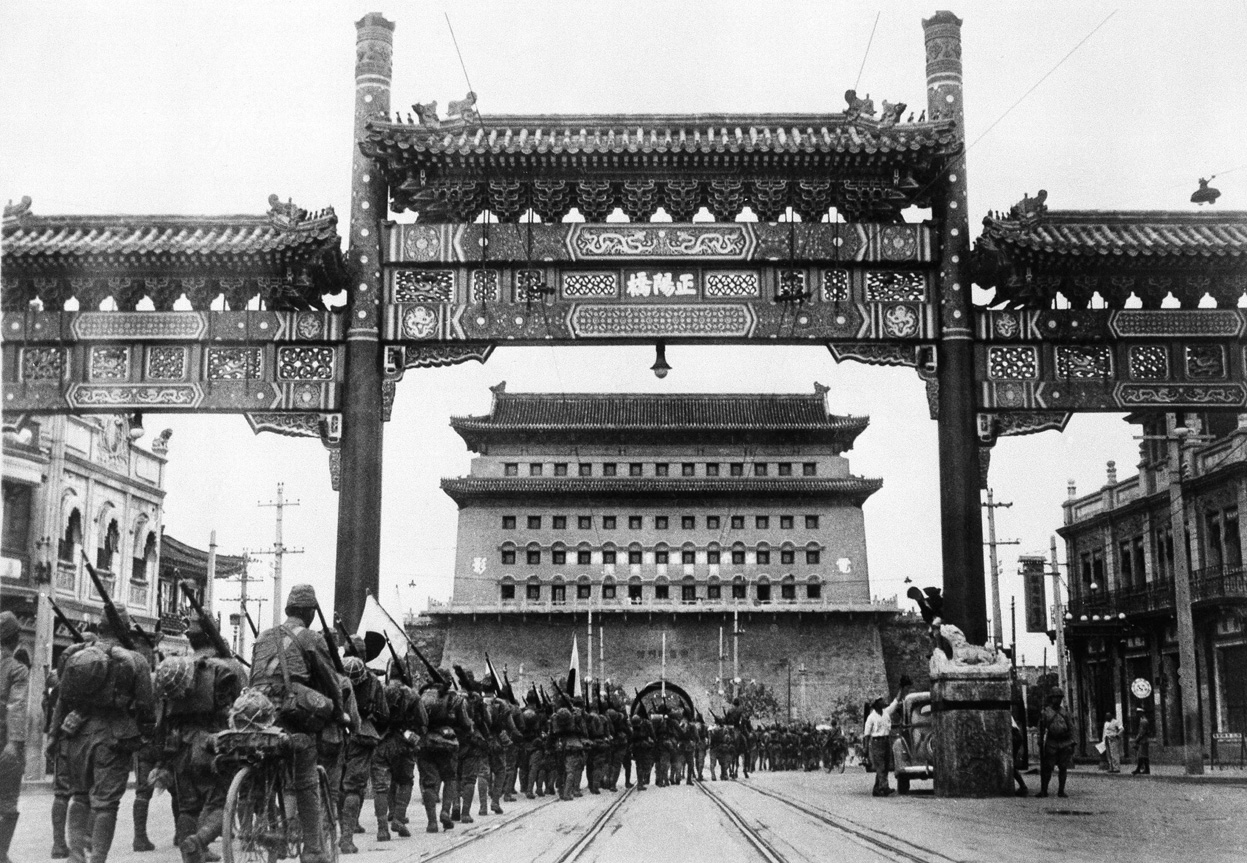
Japanese troops march into Zhengyangmen of Beijing after capturing the city in July 1937.

Japan had been involved in the Asian continent continuously from the First Sino-Japanese War, Boxer Rebellion, Russo-Japanese War, World War I and the Siberian Intervention. During the term of Prime Minister Tanaka Giichi from 1927 to 1929, Japan sent troops three times to China to obstruct Chiang Kai-shek's unification campaign. In June 1928, adventurist officers of the Kwantung Army embarked on unauthorized initiatives to protect Japanese interests in Manchuria, including the assassination of a former ally, warlord Zhang Zuolin, in hopes of sparking a general conflict.

The Manchurian Incident of September 1931 did not fail, and it set the stage for the Japanese military takeover of all of Manchuria. Kwantung Army conspirators blew up a few meters of the South Manchurian Railway Company track near Mukden, blamed it on Chinese saboteurs, and used the event as an excuse to invade and seize the vast territory. In Tokyo one month later, in the Imperial Colors Incident, military figures failed in an attempt to establish a military dictatorship, but again the news was suppressed, and the military perpetrators were not punished. In January 1932, Japanese forces attacked Shanghai in the First Shanghai Incident, waging a three-month undeclared war there before a truce was reached. The civilian government in Tokyo was powerless to prevent these military adventures, and instead of being condemned, the Kwangtung Army's actions enjoyed considerable popular support.

The Empire of Japan in 1939

Inukai's successors, military men chosen by Saionji Kinmochi, the last surviving genrō, recognized Manchukuo and generally approved the army's actions in securing Manchuria as an industrial base, an area for Japanese emigration, and a potential staging ground for war with the Soviet Union. Various army factions contended for power amid increasing suppression of dissent and more assassinations. In the February 26 Incident of 1936, the Army's elite First Infantry Division staged an attempted coup d'état in yet another effort to overthrow civilian rule. The revolt was put down by other military units, and its leaders were executed after secret trials. Despite public dismay over these events and the discredit they brought to numerous military figures, Japan's civilian leadership capitulated to the army's demands in the hope of ending domestic violence. Increases were seen in defense budgets, naval construction (Japan announced it would no longer accede to disarmament treaties), and patriotic indoctrination as Japan moved toward a wartime footing.

In November 1936, the Anti-Comintern Pact, an agreement to exchange information and collaborate in preventing communist activities, was signed by Japan and Germany (Italy joined a year later). War was launched against China with the Marco Polo Bridge Incident of July 7, 1937, in which a clash near Beijing between Chinese and Japanese troops quickly escalated into the full-scale warfare of the Second Sino-Japanese War, followed by the Soviet-Japanese Border Wars and the Pacific War.

The Greater East Asia Co-Prosperity Sphere in 1942

Despite the military's long tradition of independence from civilian control, its efforts at staging a coup d'état to overthrow the civilian government, and its forcing Japan into war through insubordination and military adventurism, the military was ultimately unable to force a military dictatorship on Japan.

Under Prime Minister Konoe Fumimaro, the Japanese government was streamlined to meet war-time conditions, and through the National Mobilization Law, it was given absolute power over the nation's assets. In 1940, all political parties were ordered to dissolve into the Imperial Rule Assistance Association, forming a one-party state based on totalitarian values. Even so, there was much entrenched opposition from the government bureaucrats, and in the 1942 general election for the Japanese Diet, the military was still unable to do away with the last vestiges of party politics. This was partly due to the fact that the military itself was not a monolithic structure, but was rent internally with its own political factions. Even Japan's wartime Prime Minister, Hideki Tōjō, had difficulty controlling portions of his own military.

Japan's overseas possessions, greatly extended as a result of early successes in the Pacific War were organized into a Greater East Asia Co-Prosperity Sphere, which was to have integrated Asia politically and economically—under Japanese leadership—against Western domination. Militarism was even reflected in the clothing trends of the 1930s. Male kimono designs adopted explicitly militaristic imagery, including soldiers, bombers, and tanks. These designs were not on public display but on linings and undergarments. They symbolised – or in the case of boy's clothes, were hoped to bring about – the alignment of the individual's goals with those of Japan as a whole.

=== Opposition to militarism ===
Despite the apparently monolithic national consensus on the official aggressive policies pursued by the Imperial government in the first part of the Shōwa era, some substantial opposition did exist. This was one of various forms of Japanese dissidence during the Shōwa period. The most organized open opposition to militarism was from the Japanese Communist Party. In the early 1930s Communist activists attempted to influence army conscripts, but the party was suppressed during the mid-1930s within Japan. Personal opposition included individuals from the fields of party politics, business and culture. Some notable examples include:

- Hara Takashi, a commoner and liberal thinker of the Rikken Seiyūkai, had become prime minister in 1918 with the rallying cry of "Militarism is dead." Three years later, however, Hara was assassinated.
- Kijūrō Shidehara followed a non-interventionist policy toward China, attempting to stabilize its relations with Great Britain and the United States. The term "Shidehara diplomacy" came to describe Japan's liberal foreign policy during the 1920s, and was assailed by military interests who believed it was weakening the country.
- Baron Takuma Dan, director of Mitsui Bank, was an important opponent of Japan overseas interventions and was known for his pro-American views. He was murdered on March 5, 1932, in the League of Blood Incident.
- Minobe Tatsukichi, a respected professor at Tokyo Imperial University declared the emperor to be a part of the constitutional structure of Japan rather than a sacred power beyond the state itself in 1935. His constitutional interpretation was overwhelmingly accepted by bureaucrats until the 1930s. In the increasingly militant 1930s, these ideas led to attacks against Minobe in the House of Peers and his resignation from that body.
- Saitō Takao, a graduate of Yale University was a member of the Rikken Minseito party. On February 2, 1940, he made a speech in the Diet in which he sharply questioned the prosecution and justification of Japan's "holy war" in China. He was expelled from the Diet on March 7, 1940, and his speech also led to the creation of the League of Diet Members Believing the Objectives of the Holy War by Fumimaro Konoe.
- Admiral Sōkichi Takagi, an opponent of Japan's decision to declare war on the United States, was asked by Navy Minister Shigetarō Shimada to compile a report analyzing Japanese defeats during the Pacific campaign of 1942. His analysis convinced Takagi of Japan's inevitable defeat. Believing that the only solution for Japan was the elimination of the Tojo-led government and a truce with the United States, Takagi began planning for the assassination of Prime Minister Hideki Tōjō before his removal from office in July 1944.
- Kanō Jigorō, creator of Judo and founder of the modern Japanese educational system, member of Japan's Olympic Committee, and de facto foreign minister for Japan was allegedly a staunch opponent of militarism. Concerned that his Judo school, the Kodokan, would be used as a military training center, he obtained a promise from the Emperor that it would not be. Alternate sources list different causes of death, and some consider his passing to be suspicious.
- Tokugawa Iesato, an aristocrat and politician who was the first head of the Tokugawa clan after the overthrow of the Tokugawa shogunate in 1868. He was President of the House of Peers from 1903 to 1933. As President of the House of Peers, Tokugawa promoted democratic principles and international goodwill. From late 1933 and into 1934, he went on a world tour to further strengthen Japan's relationship with its allies in the U.S. and Europe so as to better resist a rising global militarism and fascism. While in the U.S., Prince Tokugawa delivered a radio address to the American public describing the long enduring and friendly relations between United States and Japan; he also met with President Franklin Delano Roosevelt, as well as other U.S. congressional leaders, encouraging a united front to prevent a potential upcoming war. It was only after his death in 1940 that Japanese militants were able to push Japan into joining the Axis Powers in World War II.

=== Japan attacking Pearl Harbor ===
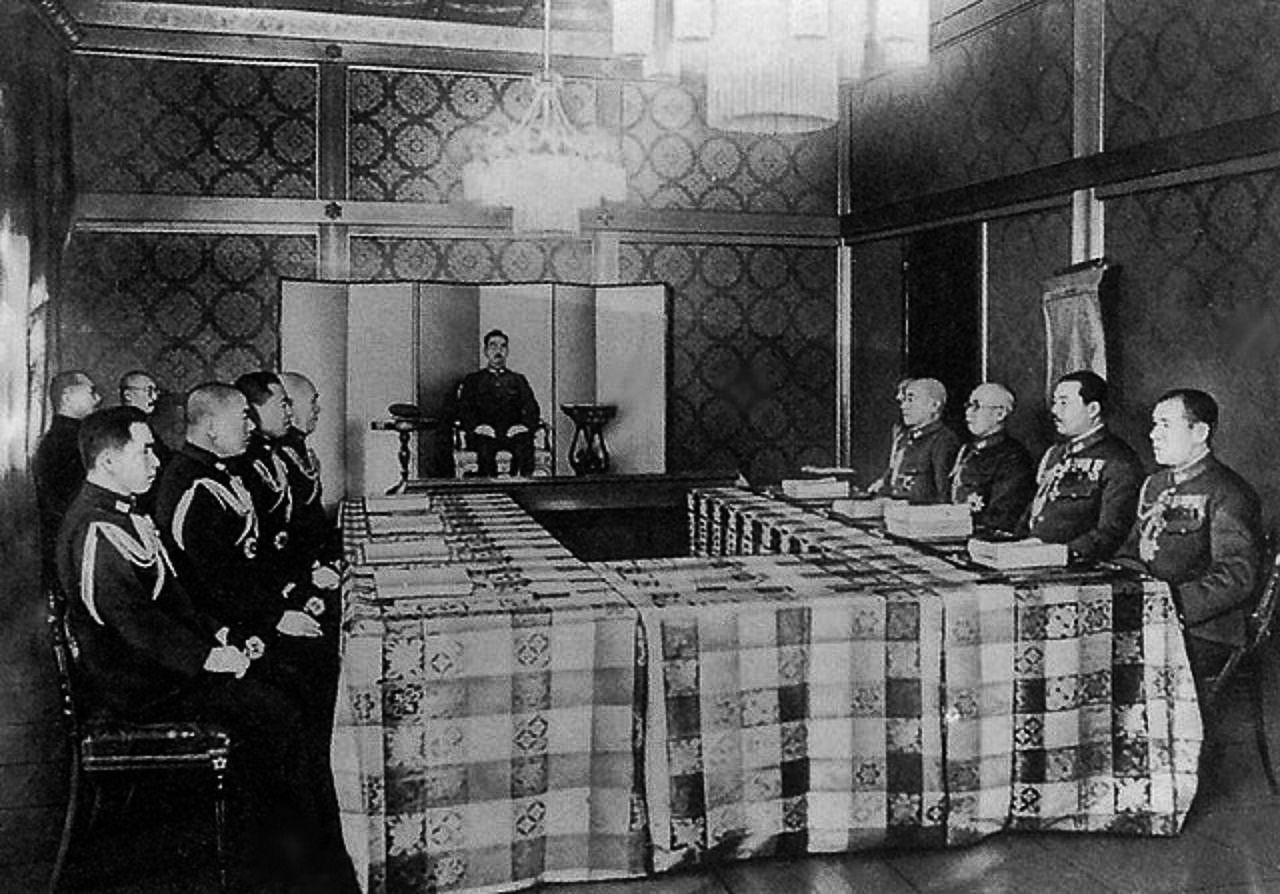
Japanese Emperor Hirohito as head of the Imperial General Headquarters on 29 April 1943

The surprise attack on Pearl Harbor happened on December 7, 1941. Multiple events led to the attack, such as the Japanese peoples' opposition to Westernism and the breaking off of negotiations between Japan and the United States. Japan had plans to take over other Asian countries, which resulted in the US stripping any war materials and resources to be sold to the Japanese and freezing all Japanese assets and bank accounts in the US. The US fleet moved from being stationed in California to be moved to Pearl Harbor to somewhat control Japan's aggression and imposed on an embargo of essential materials, because Japan was trying to take over and control more territories.

=== Postwar Japan ===
Despite efforts to totally militarize Japanese society during the war, including such measures as the National Service Draft Ordinance and the National Spiritual Mobilization Movement, Japanese militarism was discredited by the failure of Japan's military in World War II and by the American occupation. After the surrender of Japan, many of its former military leaders were tried for war crimes before the Tokyo tribunal. Furthermore, its government and educational system were revised and pacifism was written into the postwar Constitution of Japan as one of its key tenets.

== Timeline ==
- 1926: Hirohito (Emperor Shōwa) became emperor upon his father's death (December 25).
- 1927: Tanaka Giichi becomes prime minister (April 20).
- 1928: Hirohito is enthroned as the Emperor (November 10).
- 1929: Osachi Hamaguchi becomes prime minister (July 2).
- 1930: Hamaguchi is wounded in an assassination attempt (November 14).
- 1931: Hamaguchi dies and Wakatsuki Reijirō becomes prime minister (April 14). Inukai Tsuyoshi becomes prime minister (December 13) and increases funding for the military in China. Mukden Incident occurs (18 September).
- 1932: After an attack on Japanese monks in Shanghai (January 18), Japanese forces shell the city (January 29). Manchukuo is established with Henry Pu Yi as emperor (February 29). Inukai is assassinated during a coup attempt and Saitō Makoto becomes prime minister (May 15). Japan is censured by the League of Nations (December 7).
- 1933: Japan leaves the League of Nations (March 27).
- 1934: Keisuke Okada becomes prime minister (July 8). Japan withdraws from the Washington Naval Treaty (December 29).
- 1936: Coup attempt, the February 26 Incident, crushed by Hirohito. Kōki Hirota becomes prime minister (March 9). Japan signs its first pact with Nazi Germany (November 25) and occupies Qingdao (December 3). Mengjiang established in Inner Mongolia.
- 1937: Senjūrō Hayashi becomes prime minister (February 2). Prince Konoe Fumimaro becomes prime minister (June 4). The Second Sino-Japanese War starts with the Battle of Lugou Bridge (July 7). Japan captures Beiping (July 31). Japanese troops occupy Nanjing (December 13), beginning the Nanjing massacre.
- 1938: Battle of Taierzhuang (March 24). Canton falls to Japanese forces (October 21).
- 1939: Hiranuma Kiichirō becomes prime minister (January 5). Japanese forces suffer a military defeat at Battles of Khalkhin Gol against Soviet forces (September 15). Nobuyuki Abe becomes prime minister (August 30).
- 1940: Mitsumasa Yonai becomes prime minister (January 16). Konoe becomes prime minister for his second term (July 22). Hundred Regiments Offensive (August–September). Japan occupies French Indochina in the wake of the fall of Paris to the Germans, and signs the Tripartite Pact (September 27).
- 1941: Japan and Soviet Union sign a non-aggression pact (April 13). General Hideki Tōjō becomes prime minister (October 18). Japanese naval forces attack Pearl Harbor, Hawaii (December 7) (see Attack on Pearl Harbor), prompting the United States to declare war on Japan (December 8) (see Pacific War). Japan conquers Hong Kong (December 25).
- 1942: Singapore surrenders to Japan (February 15). Japan bombs Australia (February 19). Indian Ocean raid (March 31-April 10). Doolittle Raid on Tokyo (April 18). Battle of the Coral Sea (May 4 – 8). Sanko sakusen implemented in North China. American forces in the Philippines surrender (May 8). Japan defeated at the Battle of Midway (June 6).
- 1943: Japan defeated at Guadalcanal campaign (February 9) and Battle of Tarawa (November 23).
- 1944: Japan defeated at Battle of Saipan (July 9). Tojo resigns and Kuniaki Koiso becomes prime minister (July 22).
- 1945: U.S. bombers begin firebombing of major Japanese cities. Japan defeated at Battle of Iwo Jima (March 26). Admiral Kantarō Suzuki becomes prime minister (April 7). Manila massacre. Japan defeated at Battle of Okinawa (June 21). U.S. drops atomic bombs on Hiroshima (August 6) and Nagasaki bomb (August 9). Telegram sent to Allied Nations agreeing Potsdam terms (7am August 10). USSR declares war on Japan (August 8) and invades Manchuria (August 9) and break through at the Battle of Mutanchiang (August 12–16). Hirohito broadcasts Japan's acceptance of the Potsdam Declaration (August 15). The official surrender ceremony in Tokyo bay follows on September 2: Occupation of Japan begins (until April 28, 1952, upon the Treaty of San Francisco)

== See also ==
- Statism in Shōwa Japan
- List of Japanese political and military incidents
- List of Japanese political figures in early Shōwa period
- State Ultranationalism
- Japanese war crimes
- Greater East Asia Co-Prosperity Sphere
- Imperialism in Asia (disambiguation)
- Japanese dissidence during the early Shōwa period for Japanese opponents to Japanese militarism.
- Article 9 of the Japanese Constitution
- Neo-militarism
