= Lewis Victor Heilbrunn =

American biologist

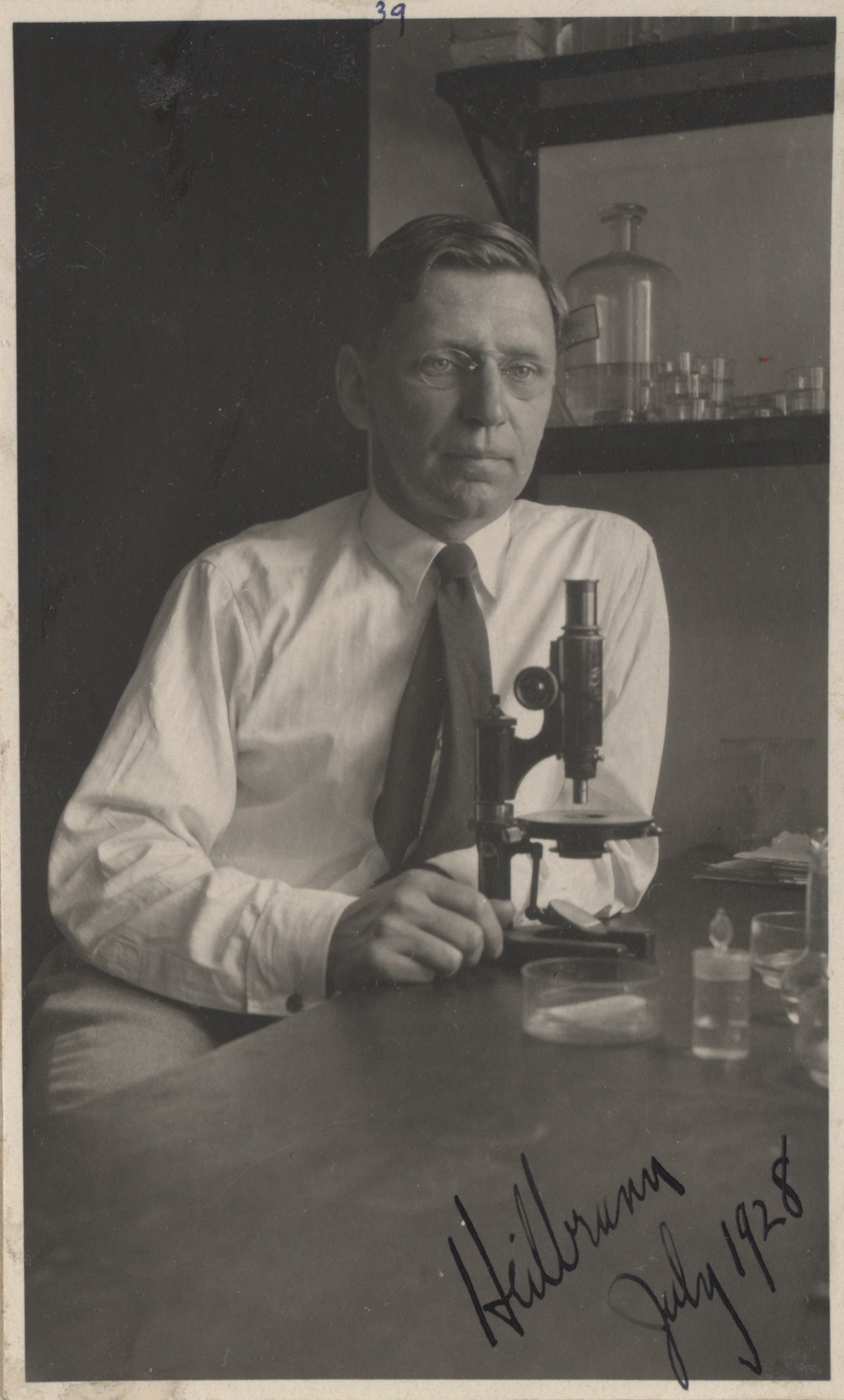
Heilbrunn, July 1928

Lewis Victor Heilbrunn (January 24, 1892 – October 1959) was an influential American biologist.

Heilbrunn was awarded a Guggenheim Fellowship in 1927, and on his return from Europe began teaching at the University of Pennsylvania, a position he would hold for 30 years. His Outline of General Physiology (first edition 1937) became a standard foundational text in the field.

== Selected works ==
- The colloid chemistry of protoplasm, Berlin, Gebrüder Borntraeger, 1928
- An outline of general physiology, Philadelphia, W.B. Saunders, 1937 (second edition 1943; third edition 1952)
- Protoplasmatologia; Handbuch der Protoplasmaforschung, Vienna, Springer, 1953
- The dynamics of living protoplasm, New York, Academic Press 1956
