= Tientsin Incident (1931) =

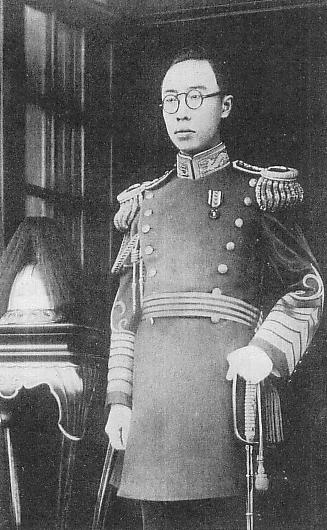
Puyi, as Emperor of Manchukuo, 1932

The Tientsin incident (Chinese: 天津事變) of 1931 was the operation planned by the Kwantung Army of the Empire of Japan to place Puyi on the throne of the Japanese-controlled Manchuria. The plan, orchestrated by Colonel Kenji Doihara and Colonel Itagaki Seishiro was successful, and Puyi became the Chief Executive of Manchukuo the following year. Puyi was subsequently enthroned as the Kangde Emperor in 1934.

== Background ==
After the Xinhai Revolution of 1912 overthrew the Qing Dynasty in China, the last Qing Emperor, Puyi, continued to live in the Forbidden City in Beijing. He was expelled by the warlord Feng Yuxiang in 1924, and found refuge within the extraterritorial Japanese concession in Tientsin.

In 1931, the Imperial Japanese Army invaded Manchuria without prior authorization from either the Imperial General Headquarters or the civilian government in Tokyo. After quickly overrunning the territory, and carving out a new state theoretically independent of Japan, the Japanese Army needed to find symbols of legitimacy, whereby the new state would be accorded international diplomatic recognition. Restoration of Puyi to the throne of his Manchu ancestors provided one such symbol, and emphasized Japan's stance in favor of tradition over communism and republicanism, and had tremendous propaganda value.

== Implementation ==
Puyi had occasion to meet with many Japanese military and civilian leaders during his stay in Tientsin, and his distant relative (and occasional house guest) Yoshiko Kawashima was a close confidant of Doihara. Puyi was receptive to the scheme, which he saw as a potential stepping stone to restoration of his rule over all of China; on the other hand, he feared becoming a pawn of the Japanese, and the dangers to himself should such a plan fail.

Doihara was on a tight schedule. For the plan to succeed, it was necessary to land Puyi at Yingkow before that port became frozen; therefore, it was imperative that the operation be brought to a successful conclusion before 16 November 1931.

Japanese Foreign Minister Kijuro Shidehara had learned of the scheme to return Puyi to Manchuria and had instructed the Japanese Consul-General at Tientsin to oppose the plan. On the afternoon of 1 November 1931, the Consul-General contacted Doihara, but Doihara was determined and stated that if the Emperor was willing to risk his life by returning to Manchuria, it would be easy to make the whole affair appear to be instigated by Chinese royalists; he further stated that he would confer with the Emperor; and if the Emperor was not willing, then he would dispatch a telegram to the military authorities at Mukden to call off the operation.

During the evening of 2 November 1931, Doihara visited Puyi and informed him that conditions were favorable and that such an opportunity should not be missed. Japan would recognize him as Emperor of an independent state and conclude defensive and offensive alliances with his new country to defend against the possibility that Chinese Nationalist armies would attack. Puyi appeared willing to follow Doihara's advice upon being told that the Imperial House of Japan favored his restoration, but still refused to give a definite answer.

The Japanese Consul-General continued his efforts to dissuade Doihara, but without results. Some difficulty was encountered by Doihara when a Chinese newspaper in Shanghai published an account of the operation and alleged that Puyi had refused Doihara's offer.

To hasten Puyi's decision, Doihara resorted to various schemes. Puyi received a bomb concealed in a basket of fruit; he also received threatening letters from the "Headquarters of the Iron Blood Group", as well as from others. Doihara instigated a riot in Tientsin on 8 November 1931 with the assistance of underworld characters, secret societies and rogues of the city, whom he paid and supplied with arms furnished by Itagaki. Arrested rioters swore later that they had been paid forty Mexican dollars each by Japanese agents provocateurs.

The Japanese Consul-General, in a further attempt to carry out Shidehara's orders, warned the Chinese police of the impending riot and they were able to prevent it from being a complete success; but it threw Tientsin into disorder. A Chinese mob of 2,000 clashed with Chinese police near the border between the Chinese city and the foreign concession. The Japanese garrison commander repulsed rioters from the vicinity of the Japanese concession with warning bursts of machine gun fire, but fired his field pieces into the Chinese quarter of Tientsin to create further confusion.

The riots continued into the night of 10 November 1931, when Doihara secretly removed Puyi from his residence to a pier in a motor car guarded by a party equipped with machine guns, entered a small Japanese military launch with a few plainclothed men and four or five armed Japanese soldiers and headed down the river to Tanggu District. At Tanggu, the party boarded the ship Awaji Maru bound for Yingkow. Puyi arrived at Yingkow on 13 November 1931. A statement was issued to the news agencies that Puyi had fled for his life as a result of threats and the riots in Tientsin.

On 1 March 1932, Puyi was installed as Chief Executive of Manchukuo. On 1 March 1934, he was inaugurated as Emperor of Manchukuo.

=== References ===
- Barrett, David (2001). Chinese Collaboration with Japan, 1932-1945: The Limits of Accommodation. Stanford University Press. ISBN 0-8047-3768-1.
- Beasley, W.G. (1991). Japanese Imperialism 1894-1945. Oxford University Press. ISBN 0-19-822168-1.
- Behr, Edward (1977). The Last Emperor. Bantam. ISBN 0-553-34474-9.
- Cotter, Edward (2007). Kids Who Rule: The Remarkable Lives of Five Child Monarchs. Annick Press. ISBN 978-1-55451-062-7.
