= Development, Growth & Differentiation =

Development Growth & Differentiation
- Discipline: Developmental biology
- Language: English
- Edited by: Masanori Taira

Publication details
- Former name: Embryologia
- History: 1950–present
- Publisher: Wiley on behalf of the Japanese Society of Developmental Biologists
- Frequency: 9/year
- Open access: Delayed, after 12 months
- Impact factor: 3.063 (2021)

Standard abbreviations
- ISO 4: Dev. Growth Differ.

Indexing
- Development, Growth & Differentiation
- CODEN: DGDFA5
- ISSN: 1440-169X (print); 1440-169X (web)
- LCCN: 92645804
- OCLC no.: 01566536
- Embryologia
- CODEN: EBYLA2
- ISSN: 0367-0228
- OCLC no.: 01567820

Links
- Journal homepage; Online access; Online archive

Development Growth & Differentiation is a peer-reviewed scientific journal published by Wiley on behalf of the Japanese Society of Developmental Biologists. It was established in 1950 as Embryologia, obtaining its current title in 1969. The editor-in-chief is Masanori Taira (Chuo University). According to the Journal Citation Reports, the journal has a 2021 impact factor of 3.063.

== Awards ==
Since 2017, the journal gives three annual awards. The "Editor-in-Chief Prize" is awarded to the most cited article of the last three years, while the "Wiley Prize" has been awarded to the most downloaded article of the previous year. Since 2011, the "Young Investigator Paper Award" have been awarded to a post-doc or graduate student's first author.

== DGD Awards ==
Editor-in-Chief Prize (Most cited)
Year	Author	vol.	page	published	Title	citation
2022	Kono, N. & Arakawa, K.	61	316- 326	2019	Nanopore sequencing: Review of potential applications in functional genomics	54
2021	Nagata, R. and Igaki, T.	60	522- 530	2018	Cell competition: Emerging mechanisms to eliminate neighbors.	11
2020	Sasaki, Hiroshi	59	12-20	2017	Roles and regulations of Hippo signaling during preimplantation mouse development.	13
2019	Niwa, Yuko S., Niwa, Ryusuke	58	94-105	2016	Transcriptional regulation of insect steroid hormone biosynthesis and its role in controlling timing of molting and metamorphosis.	12
2018	Kazumasa Ohashi	57	275-290	2015	Roles of cofilin in development and its mechanisms of regulation.	9
2017	Noriyuki Kishi, Kenya Sato, Erika Sasaki and Hideyuki Okano	56	53-62	2014	Common marmoset as a new model animal for neuroscience research and genome editing technology	18
2016	Masamitsu Konno, Atsushi Hamabe, Shinichiro Hasegawa, Hisataka Ogawa, Takahito Fukusumi, Shimpei Nishikawa, Katsuya Ohta, Yoshihiro Kano, Miyuki Ozaki, Yuko Noguchi, Daisuke Sakai, Toshihiro Kudoh, Koichi Kawamoto, Hidetoshi Eguchi, Taroh Satoh, Masahiro Tanemura, Hiroaki Nagano, Yuichiro Doki, Masaki Mori and Hideshi Ishii	55	309-318	2013	Adipose-derived mesenchymal stem cells and regenerative medicine.	32
2015	Ramesh S Pillai and Shinichiro Chuma	54	78-92	2012	piRNAs and their involvement in male germline development in mice	39
2014	Erina Kuranaga	53	137-148	2011	Caspase signaling in animal development.	
2013	Shibata N, Rouhana L, Agata K	52	27-41	2010	Cellular and molecular dissection of pluripotent adult somatic stem cells in planarias	
2012	Yoshihiko Umesono & Kiyokazu Agata	51	185-195	2009	Evolution and regeneration of the planarian central nervous system.	
2011	Nagahama, Yoshitaka, Yamashita, Masakane	50	195-219	2008	Regulation of oocyte maturation in fish	32
2010	Agata K, Saito Y, Nakajima E.	49	73-78	2007	Unifying principles of regeneration I: Epimorphosis versus morphallaxis.	
2009	Agata K, Saito Y, Nakajima E.	49	73-78	2007	Unifying principles of regeneration I: Epimorphosis versus morphallaxis.	
2008	Zhao, CT; Meng, AM.	47	201-211		Sp1-like transcription factors are regulators of embryonic development in vertebrates.	
2007	Kojima, T.	46	115-129	2004	The mechanism of Drosophila leg development along the proximodistal axis.	

Wiley Prize (Most downloaded)
Year	Author	vol	page	Published	Title	Download#
2022	Thompson, W. L. & Takebe, T.	63	47- 58	2021	Human liver model systems in a dish	2766
2021	Sakano, H.	62	199- 213	2020	Developmental regulation of olfactory circuit formation in mice.	1495
2020	Kono, Nobuaki, Kono and Kazuharu, Arakawa	61	316-326	2019	Nanopore sequencing: Review of potential applications in functional genomics.	8171
2019	Masaki Kinoshita, Austin Smith	60	44-52	2018	Pluripotency Deconstructed.	1519
2018	Hiroshi Sasaki	59	12-20	2017	Roles and regulations of Hippo signaling during preimplantation mouse development.	1135
2017	Luan Wen and Yun-Bo Shi	58	106-115	2016	Regulation of growth rate and developmental timing by Xenopus thyroid hormone receptor α.	
2016	Kwok Yeung Tsang, Danny Chan and Kathryn S. E. Cheah	57	179-192	2015	Fate of growth plate hypertrophic chondrocytes: Death or lineage extension?	733
2015	Daisuke Mashiko, Samantha A. M. Young, Masanaga Muto, Hirotaka Kato, Kaori Nozawa, Masaki Ogawa, Taichi Noda, Yeon-Joo Kim, Yuhkoh Satouh, Yoshitaka Fujihara and Masahito Ikawa	56	122-129	2014	Feasibility for a large scale mouse mutagenesis by injecting CRISPR/Cas plasmid into zygotes.	3237
2014	Ken-ichi Nishijima and Shinji Iijima	55	207-216	2013	Transgenic chickens	
2013	Ramesh S Pillai and Shinichiro Chuma	54	78-92	2012	piRNAs and their involvement in male germline development in mice.	
2012	Erina Kuranaga	53	137-148	2011	Caspase signaling in animal development	
2011	Kazutoshi Takahashi	52	181-193	2010	Direct reprogramming.	1073
2010	Katsube K, Sakamoto K, Tamamura Y, Yamaguchi A.	51	55-67	2009	Role of CCN, a vertebrate specific gene family, in development.	
2009	Katsube K, Sakamoto K, Tamamura Y, Yamaguchi A.	51	55-67	2009	Role of CCN, a vertebrate specific gene family, in development.	
2008	Tadahiro Iimura, Olivier Pourquie	49	265-275	2007	Hox genes in time and space during vertebrate body formation.	
2007	Baharvand H, Jafary H, Massumi M, and Ashtiani SK.	48	323-332	2006	Generation of insulin-secreting cells from human embryonic stem cells.	

Young Investigator Paper Award
Year	Authors・Awardee(bold)	vol	page	published	Title
2022	Seya, Daiki, Ihara, D., Shirai, M., Kawamura, T., Watanabe, Y. & Nakagawa, O.	63	82- 92	2021	A role of Hey2 transcription factor for right ventricle development through regulation of Tbx2-Mycn pathway during cardiac morphogenesis
2022	Hiraga, Hirokuni, Ishita, Y., Chihara, T. & Okumura, M.	63	488- 500	2021	Efficient visual screening of CRISPR/Cas9 genome editing in the nematode Pristionchus pacificus
2022	Diaz-Cuadros, Margarete & Pourquie, O.	63	140- 153	2021	In vitro systems: A new window to the segmentation clock
2021	Inamori, S., Fujii, M., Satake, S., Iida, H., Teramoto, M., Sumi, T., Meno, C., Ishii, Y. and Kondoh, H.	62	243- 259	2020	Modeling early stages of endoderm development in epiblast stem cell aggregates with supply of extracellular matrices.
2021	Das, P., Salazar, J. L., Li-Kroeger, D., Yamamoto, S., Nakamura, M., Sasamura, T., Inaki, M., Masuda, W., Kitagawa, M., Yamakawa, T., and Matsuno, K.	62	80- 93	2020	Maternal almondex, a neurogenic gene, is required for proper subcellular Notch distribution in early Drosophila embryogenesis.
2021	Enny, A., Flaherty, K., Mori, S., Turner, N. and Nakamura, T.	62	311- 325	2020	Developmental constraints on fin diversity.
2021	Onimaru, K.	62	326- 333	2020	The evolutionary origin of developmental enhancers in vertebrates: Insights from non-model species.
2020	Shiori Yamamoto, Yuji Uchida, Tomomi Ohtani, Erina Nozaki, Chunyang Yin, Yoshihiro Gotoh, Nayuta Yakushiji-Kaminatsui, Tetsuya Higashiyama, Takamasa Suzuki. Tatsuya Takemoto, Yo-ichi Shiraishi, Atsushi Kuroiwa	61	228-251	2019	Hoxa13 regulates expression of common Hox target genes involved in cartilage development to coordinate the expansion of the autopodal anlage.
2020	Misaki Shirahama, Ichie Steinfeld, Akari Karaiwa, Shigeru Taketani, Astrid Vogel-Höpker, Paul G. Layer, Masasuke Araki	61	252-262	2019	Change in the developmental fate of the chick optic vesicle from the neural retina to the telencephalon.
2020	Hirono Kina, Takashi Yoshitani, Kazuko Hanyu, Akira Nakamura	61	265-275	2019	Rapid and efficient generation of GFP-knocked-in Drosophila by the CRISPR-Cas9-mediated genome editing.
2019	Takebayashi-Suzuki, Kimiko, Konishi, H., Miyamoto, T., Nagata, T., Uchida, M., Suzuki, A	60	158-173	2018	Coordinated regulation of the dorsal-ventral and anterior-posterior patterning of Xenopus embryos by the BTB/POZ zinc finger protein Zbtb14.
2019	Tatsuya Kamimura, Toshiyuki Yamagishi, Yuji Nakajima	60	97-111	2018	Avian coronary endothelium is a mosaic of sinus venosus- and ventricle-derived endothelial cells in a region-specific manner.
2019	Kazutaka Hosoda, Minako Motoishi, Takuya Kunimoto, Osamu Nishimura, Byulnim Hwang, Sumire Kobayashi, Shigenobu Yazawa, Makoto Mochii, Kiyokazu Agata, Yoshihiko Umesono	60	341-353	2018	Role of MEKK1 in the anterior-posterior patterning during planarian regeneration.
2018	Hidetaka Katow, Teppei Kanaya, T. Ogawa, R. Egawa and H. Yawo	59	115-128	2017	Regulation of axon arborization pattern in the developing ciliary ganglion: Possible involvement of caspase 3.
2018	Mayoko Tsuji, M. Morishima, K. Shimizu, S. Morikawa, M. Heglind, S. Enerback, T. Ezaki and J. Tamaoki	59	501-514	2017	Foxc2 influences alveolar epithelial cell differentiation during lung development.
2018	Kanami Noguchi, Ryota Ishikawa, M. Kawaguchi, K. Miyoshi, T. Kawasaki, T. Hirata, M. Fukui, S. Kuratani, M. Tanaka and Y. Murakami	59	270-285	2017	Expression patterns of Sema3A in developing amniote limbs: With reference to the diversification of peripheral nerve innervation.
2017	Junming Chen, Xiuli Lian, Juan Du, Songhua Xu, Jianen Wei, Lili Pang, Chanchan Song, Lin He and Shie Wang	58	280-292	2016	Inhibition of phosphorylated Ser473-Akt from translocating into the nucleus contributes to 2-cell arrest and defective zygotic genome activation in mouse preimplantation embryogenesis.
2017	Yukika Saga, Tomoka Inamura, Nao Shimada and Takefumi Kawata	58	383-399	2016	Regulation of ecmF gene expression and genetic hierarchy among STATa, CudA, and MybC on several prestalk A-specific gene expressions in Dictyostelium.
2017	Yudai Tokumasu, Atsuo Iida, Zi Wang, Satoshi Ansai, Masato Kinoshita and Atsuko Sehara-Fujisawa.	58	409-421	2016	ADAM12-deficient zebrafish exhibit retardation in body growth at the juvenile stage without developmental defects.
2016	Eriko Nishitani, Chong Li, Jaehoon Lee, Hiroyo Hotta, Yuta Katayama, Masahiro Yamaguchi and Tsutomu Kinoshita	57	591-600	2015	Pou5f3.2-induced proliferative state of embryonic cells during gastrulation of Xenopus laevis embryo.
2016	Yasuhiko Tosa, Ayako Hirao, Ikumi Matsubara, Masahumi Kawaguchi, Makiko Fukui, Shigeru Kuratani and Yasunori Murakami	57	40-57	2015	Development of the thalamo-dorsal ventricular ridge tract in the Chinese soft-shelled turtle, Pelodiscus sinensis.
2016	Caixia Li, Pingping Zhang and Jieruo G.	57	264-237	2015	miR-29a modulates tumor necrosis factor-α-induced osteogenic inhibition by targeting Wnt antagonists.
2015	Maha Anani, Ikuo Nobuhisa, Mitsujiro Osawa, Atsushi Iwama, Kaho Harada, Kiyoka Saito and Tetsuya Taga	56	469-479	2014	Sox17 as a candidate regulator of myeloid restricted differentiation potential.
2015	Akiha Nishihara and Chikara Hashimoto	56	214-222	2014	Tail structure is formed when blastocoel roof contacts blastocoel floor in Xenopus laevis.
2015	Yoshiyuki Matsubara, Atsushi Sakai, Atsushi Kuroiwa and Takayuki Suzuki	56	573-582	2014	Efficient embryonic culture method for, and its early developmental stages.
2014	Yosuke Horikawa, Haruka Matsumoto, Fumika Yamaguchi, Satomi Ishida and Shigeki Fujiwara	55	776-785	2013	Transcriptional regulation in the early ectodermal lineage of ascidian embryos.
2014	Shoko Mori, Yuki Moriyama, Kumiko Yoshikawa, Tomoyo Furukawa and Hiroki Kuroda	55	350-358	2013	β-adrenergic signaling promotes posteriorization in Xenopus early development.
2014	Tong Sun, Bohye Kim and Lou W. Kim	55	207-216	2013	Glycogen Synthase Kinase 3 influences cell motility and chemotaxis by regulating PI3K membrane localization in Dictyostelium.
2013	Namiko Kamiyama, Ryohei Seki, Hitoshi Yokoyama and Koji Tamura	54	619-632	2012	Heterochronically early decline of Hox expression prior to cartilage formation in the avian hindlimb zeugopod.
2013	Emiko Yamanishi, Masanori Takahashi, Yumiko Saga and Noriko Osumi	54	785-800	2012	Penetration and differentiation of cephalic neural crest-derived cells in the developing mouse telencephalon.
2013	Hiroki Ohgami, Masateru Hiyoshi, Md. Golam Mostafa, Hideo Kubo, Shin-Ichi Abe and Kazufumi Takamune	54	660-671	2012	Xtr, a plural tudor domain-containing protein, is involved in the translational regulation of maternal mRNA during oocyte maturation in Xenopus laevis.
2012	Nariaki Yanagawa, Masahide Sakabe, Hirokazu Sakata, Toshiyuki Yamagishi, Yuji Nakajima	53	366-377	2011	Nodal signal is required for morphogenetic movements of epiblast layer in the pre-streak chick blastoderm.
2012	Junichi Tasaki, Norito Shibata, Toshihide Sakurai, Kiyokazu Agata, Yoshihiko Umesono	53	389-400	2011	Role of c-Jun N-terminal kinase activation in blastema formation during planarian regeneration.
2012	Noha Dabour, Tetsuya Bando, Taro Nakamura, Katsuyuki Miyawaki, Taro Mito, Hideyo Ohuchi and Sumihare Noji	53	857-869	2011	Cricket body size is altered by systemic RNAi against insulin signaling components and epidermal growth factor receptor.
2011	Hideyuki Dekimoto, Toshio Terashima and Yu Katsuyama	52	181-193	2010	Dispersion of the neurons expressing layer specific markers in the reeler brain.
2011	Nagamoto Kaneko, You Katsuyama, Kazuo Kawamura, and Shigeki Fujiwara	52	457-468	2010	Regenaration of the gut requires retinoic acid in the budding ascidian Polyandrocarpa misakinesis.
2011	Asaka Uejima, Takanori Amano, Naoki Nomura, Miyuki Noro, Taiji Yasue, Toshihiko Shiroishi, Kunimasa Ohta, Hitoshi Yokoyama1 and Koji Tamura	52	223-234	2010	Anterior shift in gene expression precedes anteriormost digit formation in amniote limbs.

== Editors-in-chief ==
The following persons are or have been editor-in-chief:

- Masanori Taira (starting 2020)
- Harukazu Nakamura (2007-2019)
- Sadao Yasugi (2003-2006)
- Makoto Asashima (2000-2002)
- Shimada Hikaru (1997-1999)
- Motonori Hoshi (1995-1996)
- Chiaki Katagiri (1990-1004)
- Mitsuki Yoneda (1987-1989)
- Kiyotaka Yamana (1982-1986)
- Tokindo Okada (1974-1981)
- Masao Sugiyama (1970-1973)
- Tadao Sato (1950-1969)
