= Dan Takuma =

Japanese noble (1858–1932)

Junior Fourth Rank Baron Dan Takuma
- 團 琢磨
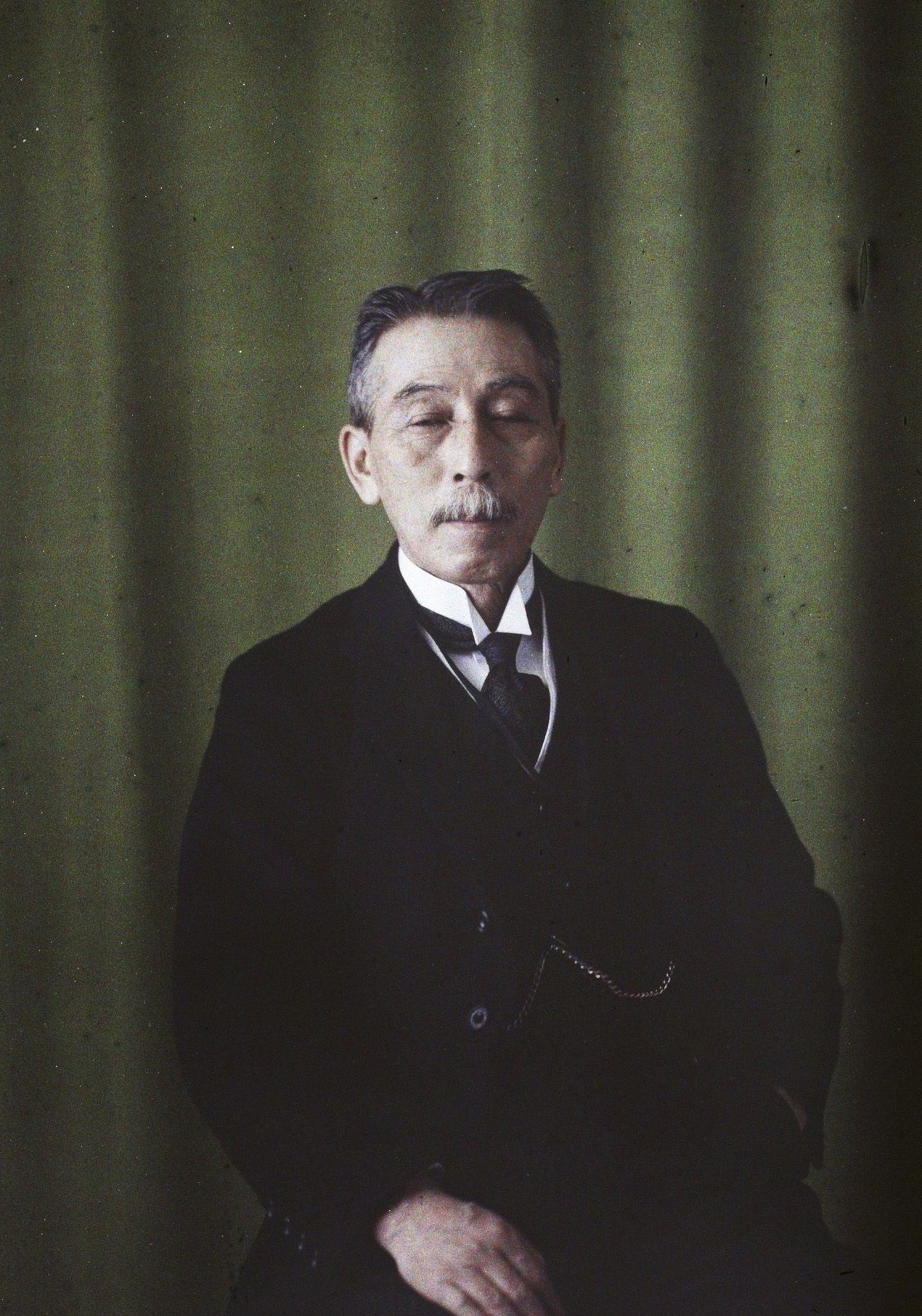
- 1922 Autochrome by Auguste Léon
- Born: September 7, 1858; Fukuoka, Japan
- Died: March 5, 1932 (aged 73); Nihonbashi, Tokyo, Japan
- Cause of death: Assassination by gunshot
- Occupations: businessman, statesman
- Relatives: Inou Dan (Children); Katsuma Dan; Ikuma Dan (Grandchildren)

Baron Dan Takuma (團 琢磨; September 7, 1858 – March 5, 1932) was a Japanese businessman who was Director-General of Mitsui, one of the leading Japanese zaibatsu (family conglomerates). He was a graduate of Massachusetts Institute of Technology and was married to the younger sister of statesman Kaneko Kentarō.

During the 1904-1905 Russo-Japanese War, there were some U.S. financiers who wished to profit by lending money to Russia so she could continue her war efforts against Japan. In contrast and in support of ending this war, Frank A. Vanderlip, Jacob Schiff and other U.S. financiers supported President Theodore Roosevelt's successful role as peacemaker between Russia and Japan. Their action was greatly appreciated by many of the leaders of Japan. The early decades of the 1900s were often challenging in terms of U.S. Japan relations. Frank A. Vanderlip and his American and Japanese allies strove to encourage increased business and trade between their nations, which could also enhance the mutual respect and understanding between the U.S. and Japan. The 1908 photo illustration to the right is linked to Frank A. Vanderlip during his U.S. business delegation’s visit to Japan, where they were greeted by Baron Shibusawa Eiichi, Prince Tokugawa Iesato (a.k.a. Prince Iyesato Tokugawa), and Baron Dan Takuma and other Japanese representatives. These statesmen often allied together to promote peace and international commerce.

During following year in 1909, in reciprocation for Frank A. Vanderlip’s 1908 business delegation’s visit to Japan, Baron Shibusawa accompanied by his approximately sixty member Japanese business/goodwill delegation toured the United States. During their U.S. visit, the Japanese were greeted by the Vanderlip family and top representatives of American Industry, such as General Electric and Westinghouse. As president of the Japan Society of Manhattan, Frank A. Vanderlip strove to maintain political goodwill and better understanding between the U.S. and Japan.

Takuma Dan continued the cultivation of closer relations between Japan and the Western powers. In 1921, he also led a Japanese Businessmen's Mission, in which a group of Japanese business leaders visited the United States, Great Britain, and France to discuss bilateral economic issues and to promote personal ties with businesspeople of those countries.

In 1927, Dan bought out Takasago Life Insurance and established Mitsui Life, as a subsidiary of Mitsui Group.

On March 5, 1932, Dan was assassinated by right-wing nationalist Gorō Hishinuma for his role in Mitsui's betting against the Japanese economy in favor of Britain, as part of the League of Blood Incident. Hishinuma was sentenced to life in prison for Dan's murder. He was released under an amnesty in 1940, and died in 1990.

Dan's son was embryologist Dan Katsuma, and his grandson was composer Dan Ikuma.

== Sources ==
- Masato Kimura, "The Contributions and Limitations of Japanese Business Diplomacy in the Interwar Period", The Suntory Center, London School of Economics, July 2002
- "Baron Takuma Dan" (obituary). The Times (London), 11 March 1932.
- Katz, Stan S. (2019). "The Art of Peace, an illustrated biography about Prince Tokugawa Iesato and his allies". TheEmperorAndTheSpy.com.
