= League of Blood Incident =

1932 assassination plot in Japan

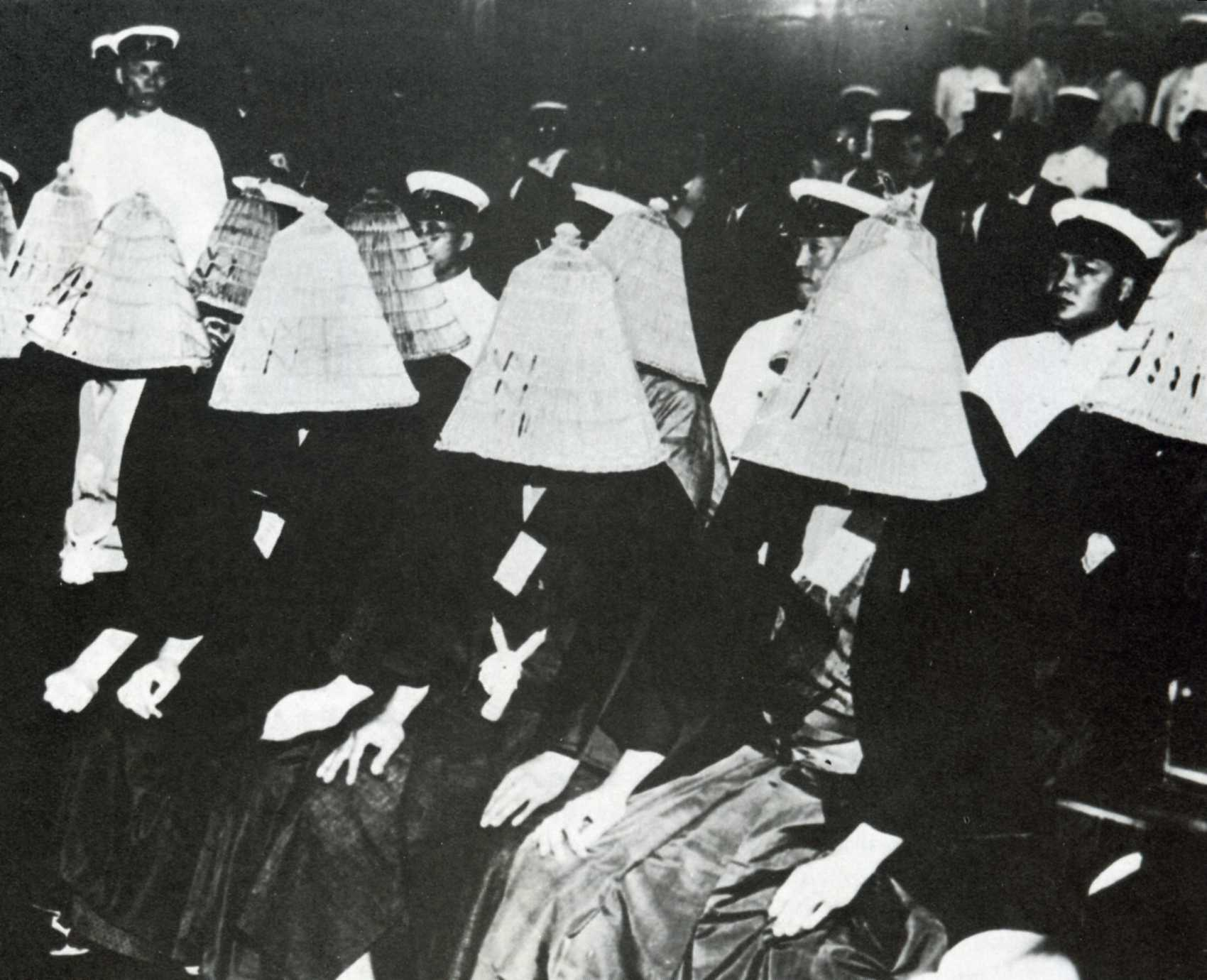
League of Blood defendants awaiting trial

The League of Blood Incident (血盟団事件, Ketsumeidan Jiken; also translated as Blood-Pledge Corps Incident) was a 1932 assassination plot in Japan in which extremists targeted wealthy businessmen and liberal politicians. The group chose twenty victims but succeeded in killing only two: former Finance Minister and head of the Rikken Minseitō political party, Junnosuke Inoue, and the Director-General of Mitsui Holding Company, Dan Takuma.

The arrest of the assassins led to the discovery of the existence of a civilian ultranationalist, fascist group led by self-styled Buddhist preacher, Nisshō Inoue.

== Background ==
Born as Inoue Shirō in 1886 in Gunma Prefecture, Nisshō spent his young adult life as a drifter and adventurer, eventually ending up in north and northeast China gathering information for the Japanese military. After a series of mystical experiences in 1923–24, Inoue became convinced that Japan required spiritual rebirth and that he was called to be its savior. He established a school in Ibaraki Prefecture to promote agrarianism and social reform, which gradually evolved into a training center for ultra-rightist radicals. He adopted the name Nisshō ("Called by The Sun") along with ideas and symbols derived from Nichiren Buddhism.

After the October incident, a failed coup d'état by rightist Army officers of the Sakurakai ultranationalist secret society in 1931, Inoue became convinced that national reform could be achieved only through violent confrontation with what he saw as the forces of evil: pro-Western liberal politicians and zaibatsu business interests. He devised the slogan "ichinin issatsu" ("one person, one kill") and drew up a list of twenty politicians and business leaders whose assassination would be the first step toward restoring supreme political power to the Emperor, a platform known as the "Shōwa Restoration".

Inoue's original group made contact with a group of extremist officers in the Imperial Japanese Navy, who strongly objected to Japan's acceptance of the Washington Naval Treaty of 1922, and a group of right-wing university students from Tokyo. Inoue distributed Browning automatic pistols to his followers; however, only two actually carried out their missions.

== Assassinations ==
On 9 February 1932, Shō Onuma gunned down Junnosuke Inoue as he stepped from his car at the Komamoto Elementary School in Tokyo, where he was scheduled to give a political speech. On 5 March 1932, Gorō Hishinuma waited outside the entrance to Mitsui Bank in Nihonbashi, Tokyo, with a picture of Takuma Dan in his pocket. When Dan arrived, he shot him dead on the spot. Both killers were apprehended immediately. On 11 March 1932, Inoue turned himself in at the Tokyo Metropolitan Police Department. Two months later, in the May 15 Incident, of 1932, Japanese naval officers, including some associated with the League of Blood, assassinated Prime Minister Inukai Tsuyoshi.

== Aftermath ==
The phrase "League of Blood" is somewhat of a misnomer, as it referred to an oath of loyalty supposedly taken by the conspirators, but there is no evidence that it was a "blood oath" in any technical sense. Nevertheless, the term "League of Blood" (血盟団, ketsumeidan) appeared in the popular press during the group's trial and was adopted by the lead prosecutor.

Historically, the most important consequences of the League of Blood Incident sprang from the trial, which gave Inoue and his co-defendants a platform from which to broadcast their ultra-nationalist views. Many in the Japanese public came to sympathize with the aims of the conspirators, if not their methods. Following the trial it became harder for courts to deal harshly with terrorists who claimed to be acting in the interests of the Emperor. In a more general sense, the trial and its aftermath contributed to the erosion of the rule of law in 1930s Japan.

Sentenced to life imprisonment in 1934, Inoue was released under a general amnesty in 1940, and died in 1967. This incident inspired the central plot of Yukio Mishima's novel Runaway Horses.

== Postwar investigation ==
In December 1945, following the defeat of Japan in World War II, the Supreme Commander for the Allied Powers (GHQ) required the Japanese government to turn over police records, trial records, and other materials related to incidents taking place between 1932 and 1940 that had been classified as terrorism, including the League of Blood Incident.
