= Wang (surname) =

Romanization of common Chinese surname

Wáng
- Romanization: Wáng (Mandarin); Wong (Hong Kong, Macau, Cantonese, Hakka); Wung (Shanghainese); Ong, Ung (Hokkien); Heng (Teochew); Uōng (Gan); Wang (Korean); Ō (Japanese); Vang, Uang, Vaaj (Hmong); Vương (Vietnamese); Heng (Thai)
- Language: Chinese, Korean, Japanese, Vietnamese, Taiwanese, Thai, Cantonese, Mandarin

Origin
- Language: Old Chinese
- Meaning: "King"

Other names
- Variant forms: Wung, Bong, Vuong Wong
- Popularity: see popular names

Chinese name
- Chinese: 王
Transcriptions
Standard Mandarin
- Hanyu Pinyin: wáng
Yue: Cantonese
- Yale Romanization: wong4
other Yue
- Taishanese: vong3
Southern Min
- Hokkien POJ: ông

Wang (/wɑːŋ/) is the pinyin romanization of the common Chinese surname 王 (Wáng). It has a mixture of various origin with uncertain lineage of family history. It is currently the most common surname in Mainland China and one of the most common surnames in Asia, with more than 107 million in Asia. It is the 8th name listed in the famous Hundred Family Surnames.

A separate surname 汪 (Wāng) is also romanized as Wang.

== Population and distribution ==
Wáng is one of the most common surnames in the world and was listed by the People's Republic of China's National Citizen ID Information System as the most common surname in mainland China in April 2007, with 92.88 million bearers and comprising 7.25% of the general population.

A 2018 survey found that there were over 100 million bearers in China, ranking first.

Wang was also the most common surname in Mainland China in 2019.

A 2013 study found the province with the most people sharing the name was Henan. Overall, the name is more prevalent in Northern China. In 2019, it was the most common surname in nearly every northern province or province-level division: Xinjiang, Gansu, Inner Mongolia, Shaanxi, Shanxi, Henan, Hebei, Anhui, Jiangsu, Shandong, Beijing, Tianjin, Liaoning, Jilin, and Heilongjiang, as well as the southern province of Hainan.

It was the 6th most common surname in Taiwan in 2018, comprising 4.10% of the general population.

Ong is the 5th-most-common surname among Chinese Singaporeans and Wong the 6th, although Wong can also include the surname 黃 (Huang in Mandarin). Singaporean Wangs are 78,000 and 1.5% of Singapore's population and 2.5% of Singapore's Chinese population.

There are 143,000 recorded Wangs in the United States as of 2014. This is a double increase from 2000, when 63,800 Wangs ranked 10th most common amongst Asian Americans and 440th amongst all Americans, respectively. There are 51,000 Wangs in California, 17,000 in New York, 10,400 in Texas, 5,900 in New Jersey, and 5,700 in Illinois. Californian Wangs rank 55th in the state, the highest rank for Wang for any state. Wang and Wong are sometimes interchangeable, as well as other Wang-based surnames so the number could vary.

Wang (Korean: 왕) is a fairly rare surname in South Korea. The 2000 South Korean Census listed only 23,447 Wangs.

== Origins ==
Wang 王 is the Chinese word for "king". William Baxter and Laurent Sagart reconstructed the Old Chinese form of Wáng as *‍ɢʷaŋ and the Middle Chinese as hjwang.

The modern bearers of the name Wang come from many different backgrounds, but there are four principal origins of the modern surname: Zi, Ji, Gui, and the adoption of the name from ethnic groups outside the Han Chinese.

=== House of Zi ===
The most ancient family name of Wang was originated from the surname Zi (子). The Chinese legend mentions that near the end of Shang dynasty, King Zhou of Shang's uncle Bi Gan, Ji Zi, and Wei Zi were called "The Three Kindhearted Men of Shang". King Zhou was violent in his rule, and Bi Gan repeatedly remonstrated to the king regarding his behavior. The king shunned his comments and killed Bi Gan instead. Bi's descendants used Wang as their surname as they are descendants of a prince and were known as "The Bi clan of the Wang family". The Zi clan has existed for about 3100 years through Qin dynasty to Tang dynasty and exists today. The Zi clan of Wang lived predominantly in modern-day Henan during these times and developed into the famous Wang family of Ji prefecture.

=== House of Ji ===
Other bearers of the surname Wang originated from the royal family of Zhou dynasty. The original surname of the royal family of Zhou dynasty was Ji (姬). However, many of them have separated out of the family due to the loss of power and land. Because they once belonged to the royal family, they used Wang as their surname. This family of Wang traced its ancestry to Wang Ziqiao.

According to the classical records, after King Wu of Zhou defeated the Shang dynasty, he established the Western Zhou dynasty. During the reign of the 21st king, King Ling of Zhou (571 - 545 BCE), the capital was in Chengzhou, present day Luoyang. A son of King Ling, Wangzi Qiao or Prince Qiao, was reduced to civilian status due to his remonstration to the king. His son Zong Jin remained as a Situ in the palace, and because of the people at the time recognized him as the descendant of the royal family, they called his family the "Wang family".

Another origin of the surname is from Crown Prince Jin, son of King Ling of Zhou of the Eastern Zhou dynasty. Jin criticized plans to divert the Gu and Luo rivers and was disowned by his father. His descendants adopted the surname Wang in commemoration of his former royal status.

In other cases, the name can also be traced back to Tian He, who usurped the throne of the Qi in 391 BC. After the annihilation of Qi by Qin in 221 BC, some descendants of nobles of Qi adopted the surname Wang in commemoration of royal ancestry.

Wang was also used as a surname by descendants of royal families in certain other states, like Wei, during the Warring States period.

The surname has also been adopted by some families of minorities like the Ke Yi (可颐) families of the Xianbei during the Northern Wei dynasty.

In some families, this surname is traced back to ancestors who either were endowed with it by an emperor or changed their original surname, claiming royal status.

During the Tang dynasty the Li clan of Zhaojun 赵郡李氏, the Cui clan of Boling 博陵崔氏, the Cui clan of Qinghe 清河崔氏, the Lu clan of Fanyang 范陽盧氏, the Zheng clan of Xingyang 荥阳郑氏, the Wang clan of Taiyuan 太原王氏, and the Li clan of Longxi 隴西李氏 were the seven noble families between whom marriage was banned by law. Moriya Mitsuo wrote a history of the Later Han-Tang period of the Taiyuan Wang. Among the strongest families was the Taiyuan Wang. The prohibition on marriage between the clans issued in 659 by the Gaozong Emperor was flouted by the seven families, since a woman of the Boling Cui married a member of the Taiyuan Wang, giving birth to the poet Wang Wei. He was the son of Wang Chulian who in turn was the son of Wang Zhou.

The marriages between the families were performed clandestinely after the prohibition was implemented on the seven families by Gaozong. The Zhou dynasty King Ling's son Prince Jin is assumed by most to be the ancestor of the Taiyuan Wang. The Longmen Wang were a cadet line of the Zhou dynasty descended Taiyuan Wang, and Wang Yan and his grandson Wang Tong hailed from his cadet line. Both Buddhist monks and scholars hailed from the Wang family of Taiyuan such as the monk Tanqian. The Wang family of Taiyuan included Wang Huan. Their status as "Seven Great surnames" became known during Gaozong's rule. The Taiyuan Wang family produced Wang Jun who served under Emperor Huai of Jin. A Fuzhou-based section of the Taiyuan Wang produced the Buddhist monk Baizhang.

== Other countries ==
=== East Asia ===
==== Korea ====
- Wang
- Hangul: 왕
- Hanja: 王
- RR: Wang
- MR: Wang

The surname Wang has a Goguryeo origin and was the royal surname of Goryeo dynasty which was founded by Wang Geon. It is said that when Goryeo fell, many changed their surname to Jeon (全) / Jeon (田) / Ok (玉) to avoid severe persecution from the succeeding Joseon dynasty. The Kaesong Wang lineage traces its ancestry to the Goryeo rulers.

==== Japan ====
Ō (Japanese: 王) is a rare Japanese name, mostly held by those of Chinese descent, such as the baseball player Sadaharu Oh (王貞治), also known as Wang Chen-chih, as well as Go player, Ō Rissei (王立誠).

=== Southeast Asia ===
==== Indonesia ====
In Indonesia, the surname is often romanized as "Heng", "Bong" or "Ong" for people of Hokkien descent, and more commonly as Ong by Chinese Peranakan. In some cases, the meaning of the names were translated into a name that sounds more like the area where these immigrant families settled in such as the surname Suraja, where in this case raja means king in Indonesian and Javanese and Su- is a common prefix within Javanese surnames.

==== Vietnam ====
In Vietnam, the name is rendered Vương (王), meaning King.

== Notable people surnamed Wang ==
=== Historical figures ===
- Wang Anshi (王安石), Song Dynasty politician
- Wang Bao (王褒), Han Dynasty poet and author
- Wang Bi (王弼), Three Kingdoms Taoist philosopher
- Wang Bo (王勃), a Tang dynasty Chinese poet
- Wong Chat Bong (王澤邦/王泽邦), founder of Wong Lo Kat (王老吉) a Chinese herbal tea
- Wang Chong (王充), Chinese philosopher during Han Dynasty
- Wang Chongyang (王重陽/王重阳), a Song Dynasty Taoist and founder of Quanzhen School
- Wang Chuzhi (王處直/王处直), a regional military governor for Dingzhou during the 5 Dynasties and 10 Kingdoms era
- Wang Cong'er (王聰兒/王聪儿), a female leader of the White Lotus Rebellion
- Wang Dao (王導/王导), Jin Dynasty pre-eminent statesman, premier and advisor
- Wang Dun (王敦), Jin Dynasty (266–420), a rebellious Jin general and later warlord
- Empress Wang (王皇后), an empress of the Chinese dynasty Tang Dynasty.
- Wang Fangqing (王方慶/王方庆), real name Wang Lin, served during the Tang Dynasty and Wu Zetian's Zhou Dynasty as a chancellor
- Wang Fu (王符), a philosopher from Gansu in the Eastern Han Dynasty
- Wang Fu (王甫), a Shu Han general serving under Liu Bei
- Wang Fu (王甫), an influential eunuch in Han Dynasty
- Wang Fu (王符), a painter from Ming Dynasty
- Wang Fuzhi (王紱/王绂), Chinese philosopher and historian
- Wang Gui (王珪) Chancellor of the Tang Dynasty
- Wang Guowei (王國維/王国维), late Qing Dynasty and early Republican Chinese scholar
- Wang Huizu (汪輝祖/汪辉祖), Chinese jurist.
- Wang Jian (王翦), a greatest general from Qin Dynasty
- Wang Jian (王儉/王俭), Liu Song and Southern Qi official
- Wang Jian (王建), founding emperor of Former Shu, posthumously known as Gaozu
- Wang Jian (王鑒/王鉴), a painter from Ming Dynasty
- Wang Jinghong (王景弘), Chinese Muslim admiral
- Wang Jishan (王及善), served during the Tang Dynasty and Wu Zetian's Zhou Dynasty as a chancellor
- Wang Jun (王濬/王浚), Jin dynasty general
- Wang Jun (王晙), a chancellor during Tang Dynasty
- Wang Lang (王朗), a Wei politician during the end of the Han Dynasty and Three Kingdoms
- Wang Mang (王莽), founder of the Xin Dynasty
- Wang Meng (王猛), known as Marquess Wu of Qinghe is a prime minister for Former Qin
- Wang Nangxian (王囊仙), another female leader of the White Lotus Rebellion
- Wang Rong (王戎), known as the 3rd East General, he served during the Jin Dynasty
- Wang Shenzhi (王審知/王审知), founder of the Min Kingdom in Fujian
- Wang Shichong (王世充), a general serving under the Sui Dynasty
- Wang Su (王肅/王肃), son of Wang Lang, adviser to Sima Shi
- Wang Wei (王維/王维), Tang Dynasty poet
- Wang Xianzhi (王仙芝), Tang Dynasty agrarian rebel
- Wang Xianzhi (王獻之/王献之), calligrapher
- Wang Xiaojie (王孝傑/王孝杰), a general served during Tang Dynasty and Wu Zetian's Zhou Dynasty
- Wang Xizhi (王羲之), calligrapher known as the Sage Calligrapher lived in Jin Dynasty
- Wang Xuan (王璿), an official of Wu Zetian's Zhou Dynasty, briefly serving as chancellor
- Wang Xuance (王玄策), a diplomat to India and guard that served during the Tang Dynasty
- Wang Yanhan (王延翰), son of Wang Shenzhi, second king of the Min Kingdom ruled from 925 to 926
- Wang Yanjun (王延鈞/王延钧), son of Wang Yanhan, third king of the Min Kingdom ruled from 926 to 935
- Wang Yangming (王陽明/王阳明), Ming Dynasty Neo-Confucian
- Wang Yi (王異/王异), official of Cao Wei
- Wang Yuanji (王元姬), Wife of Sima Zhao and Empress Dowager of Jin Dynasty
- Wang Zhaojun (王昭君), one of the Four Beauties of ancient China
- Wang Zhen (王禎/王祯), an official and an inventor for Yuan Dynasty known for the first wooden movable type printing
- Wang Zhen (王振), powerful eunuch during the Ming Dynasty
- Wang Zhen (Wang Yiting) (王震（王一亭）), well-known painter of the "Shanghai school" in the Qing Dynasty
- Wang Zhi (王直), a pirate leader in Ming Dynasty
- Wang Zhihuan (王之渙/王之涣), a Chinese poet of Tang Dynasty
- Wang Ziping (王子平), Chinese Muslim martial artist
- Wang Zongyan (王宗衍), son of Wang Jian, second ruler of the Qian Kingdom (Former Shu)
- Wang Zhihui (王志輝/王志辉), retired Chinese long jumper

=== Mainland China ===
- Wang Bingbing (王冰冰), Chinese ski mountaineer
- Charles Wang (王嘉廉), Chinese-American CEO of Computer Associates
- Charles Wang (physician) (王志偉/王志伟), Chinese physician and lawyer
- Wang Changyuan (王昌元), Chinese guzheng performer and composer
- Wang Chunchen (王春辰), Chinese art historian, curator, and critic
- Wang Churan (王楚然), Chinese actress
- Wang Daiyu (王岱輿/王岱舆), Chinese Hanafi-Maturidi scholar
- Wang Dan (王丹), Chinese activist, leader of the Chinese democracy movement
- Wang Danyi (王丹一), Chinese revolutionary activist and policy researcher
- Dylan Wang (王鶴棣/王鹤棣), Chinese actor
- Wang Fang (王芳), Chinese singer
- Wang Fanxi (王凡西), Chinese Trotskyist revolutionary
- Wang Feifei (王霏霏), Chinese singer and actress
- Wang Fengchao (王鳳朝/王凤朝), Chinese politician
- Wang Guangmei (王光美), Chinese politician
- Wang Guangya (王光亞/王光亚), Chinese diplomat
- Wang Guowei (王國維/王国维), Chinese historian and poet
- Wang Hai (王海), Chinese fighter pilot
- Wang Hanlun (王漢倫/王汉伦), Chinese actress
- Wang Hao (王皓), Chinese chess grandmaster
- Wang Hao (王皓), Chinese table tennis player
- Wang Hao (王浩), Chinese-American logician, philosopher and mathematician
- Haolu Wang (王昊鹭), Chinese film and television director
- Wang Hongwen (王洪文), Chinese labour activist and politician
- Wang Huning (王滬寧/王沪宁), Chinese politician
- Wang Jibing (王计兵), Chinese poet
- Wang Jiexi (王洁曦), Chinese actor
- Wang Jiujiang (王久江), Sichuanese painter
- Wang Jun (王軍/王军), Chinese businessman
- Wang Jun (王君), Chinese politician
- Wang Junkai (王俊凱/王俊凯), Chinese singer and actor
- Wang Kang (王康), Chinese footballer
- Wang Lin (王琳), Chinese badminton player
- Wang Ling (王鈴/王铃), Chinese historian and sinologist
- Wang Liqiang (王立強/王立强), Chinese defector and self-declared former spy
- Wang Liqin (王勵勤/王励勤), Chinese table tennis player
- Wang Ming (王明), Chinese activist, senior leader of the early Chinese Communist Party
- Wang Ming-chen (王明貞/王明贞), Chinese physicist and science educator
- Wang Nan (王楠), Chinese table tennis player
- Wang Qiang (王薔/王蔷), Chinese tennis player
- Wang Qing (王青), Chinese actor and singer
- Wang Qishan (王岐山), Chinese retired politician
- Wang Renzhi (王忍之), Chinese politician
- Wang Rong (王榮/王荣), Chinese politician
- Roy Wang (王源), Chinese singer and actor
- Wang Shiwei (王實味/王实味), Chinese journalist and literary writer
- Wang Shizhen (王士珍), Chinese general and politician
- Taddeo Wang Yuesheng (王躍勝/王跃胜), Chinese Catholic bishop
- Wang Tao (王韜/王韬), Chinese translator, reformer, political columnist, newspaper publisher and fiction writer
- Wang Xiaobo (王小波), Chinese novelist and essayist
- Wang Xinyu, a female Chinese tennis player
- Wang Xiyu, a female Chinese tennis player
- Wang Xuan (王選/王选), Chinese computer scientist
- Wang Yan (王妍), Chinese Olympic gymnast
- Yang Wang (王洋), Chinese high jumper
- Wang Yanbo (王彦博), Chinese professional wrestler
- Wang Yaowu (王耀武), Chinese high-ranking KMT general
- Wang Yeping (王冶坪), Chinese politician
- Wang Yi (王毅), Chinese diplomat and politician
- Wang Yihan (王儀涵/王仪涵), Chinese retired badminton player
- Wang Yibo (王一博), Chinese actor and singer
- Wang Yinglu (王影璐), Chinese actress
- Wang Yiren (王怡人), Chinese singer, member of girl group Everglow
- Yuja Wang (王羽佳), Chinese classical pianist
- Yunhong Wang (王蕴红), Chinese computer scientist and professor
- Wang Yunshan (王雲山/王云山) (aka Jizi, 姬子), Chinese painter
- Wang Yuwen (王玉雯), Chinese actress
- Wang Zhaoguo (王兆國/王兆国), Chinese politician
- Wang Zhen (王震), Chinese political figure and one of the Eight Elders of the Chinese Communist Party
- Wang Zhen, Chinese acrobatic gymnast
- Wang Zhengjun (王政君), Han Dynasty empress
- Wang Zhengwei (王正伟/王正偉), Chinese retired politician and economist
- Wang Zhijian (王志健), Chinese perpetrator of the Yishun triple murders
- Wang Zhizhi (王治郅), Chinese former professional basketball player
- Wang Zhongshu (王仲殊), Chinese archaeologist
- Wang Zisai (王梓賽/王梓赛), Chinese trampoline gymnast

=== Taiwan ===
- Andrew H. J. Wang (王惠鈞/王惠钧), Taiwanese biochemist
- Cyndi Wang (王心凌), Mandopop singer
- Joanna Wang (王若琳), Taiwanese-American singer-songwriter
- Leehom Wang (王力宏), Taiwanese-American singer-songwriter, actor and commercial model
- Ong Iok-tek (Wang Yude) (王育德), scholar and early leader of the Taiwan independence movement
- Wang Cheng-teng (王政騰/王政腾), Deputy Minister of the Council of Agriculture of the Republic of China
- Wang Chien-fa (王乾發/王乾发), Magistrate of Penghu County (2005–2014)
- Chien-Ming Wang (王建民), former professional baseball pitcher for the New York Yankees and Washington Nationals
- Wang Chien-shien (王建煊), Republic of China politician
- Wang Chung-yi (王崇儀/王崇仪), Minister of Coast Guard Administration of the Republic of China (2014–2016)
- Darren Wang (王大陸/王大陆), Taiwanese actor famous in the Mainland
- Wang Ginn-wang (王進旺/王进旺), Minister of the Coast Guard Administration of the Republic of China (2006–2014)
- Jimmy Wang Yu (王羽), Mainland-born Taiwanese actor, film director, producer, and screenwriter who started his career in Hong Kong as a Shaw Brothers Studio actor
- Wang Ju-hsuan (王如玄), Minister of Council of Labor Affairs of the Republic of China (2008–2012)
- Hsien Chung Wang (王宪锺/王宪钟), Chinese-American mathematician
- Wang Kwo-tsai (王國材/王国材), Political Deputy Minister of Transportation and Communications
- Wang Kai (王建隆), Taiwanese actor
- Wang Li-ling (王儷玲/王俪玲), Chairperson of Financial Supervisory Commission of the Republic of China (2016)
- Wang Mei-hua (王美花), former Vice Minister of Economic Affairs of the Republic of China
- Wang Yixiang (王美花), Taiwanese singer of boygroup &TEAM
- Wang Yu-chi (王郁琦), former Minister of Mainland Affairs Council of the Republic of China (2012–2015)
- Wang Yu-yun (王玉雲/王玉云), former mayor of Kaohsiung City (1973–1981)

=== Hong Kong ===
- Jackson Wang (王嘉爾/王嘉尔), Hong Kong rapper and singer based in Mainland China, and a member of South Korean boy group Got7
- Dave Wang (王傑/王杰), a Hong Kong-Taiwanese singer and actor

=== Korea ===
- Wang Bit-na (왕빛나, 王嫔娜), South Korean actress and model
- Wang Geon (왕건, 王建), founder of the royal family, the House of Wang of the Goryeo dynasty
- Wang Jeung-hun (왕정훈), South Korean professional golfer
- Wang Ji-hye (왕지혜, 王智慧), South Korean actress
- Jun Ji-hyun (born Wang Ji-hyun; 왕지현, 王智賢), South Korean actress and model
- Wang Ji-won (왕지원, 王智媛), South Korean actress and ballet dancer
- Wang Ki-Chun (왕기춘, 王機春), South Korean former judoka
- Wang Seok-hyeon (왕석현, 王晳鉉), South Korean actor
- Wang Yoo-sun (왕유선, 王裕善), South Korean actress

=== India ===
- Doma Wang, Indian chef

=== Indonesia ===
- Ong Eng Die (王永利), Indonesian politician and economist
- Ong Hok Ham (王福涵), Indonesian historian and academic
- Kimun Ongkosandjojo (Ong Kiem Oen; 王金溫/王金温), Indonesian businessman and inventor
- Susi Susanti (Ong Lien Hiang; 王蓮香/王莲香), retired badminton player, the first Indonesian Olympic gold medalist

=== Malaysia ===
- Wang Shujin (Ong Seok Kim) (王樹金/王树金), Malaysian educationist, social worker and philanthropist
- Wang Wenhua (Chin Peng)/(Ong Boon Hua)(王文華/王文华), Leader of the Malayan Communist Party
- Michael Wong (王光良), Malaysian singer and songwriter

=== Singapore ===
- Ong Teng Cheong (王鼎昌), Former President of the Republic of Singapore
- Heng Swee Keat (王瑞傑/王瑞杰), Deputy Prime Minister of the Republic of Singapore
- Ong Ye Kung (王乙康), Singaporean politician
- Daniel Ong (王盟友), Singaporean businessman, radio DJ and television host
- David Ong (王金發/王金发), Former Singaporean member of parliament
- Peter Ong (王文輝/王文辉), Government official in Singapore; Head of Civil Service
- Thomas Ong (王沺裁), Singaporean actor, television host and businessman
- Xavier Ong (王勝宇/王胜宇), Singaporean actor
- Wang Yuqing (王昱清), Singaporean actor
- Ong Eng Guan (王永元), Singaporean politician
- Ong Keng Sen (王景生), Singaporean director of the theatre group TheatreWorks
- Ong Keng Yong (王景榮/王景荣), Singaporean diplomat
- Ong Kim Seng (王金成), Singaporean artist
- Anthea Ong (王麗婷/王丽婷), former Singaporean Nominated Member of Parliament
- Ong Pang Boon (王邦文), former Singaporean politician
- Remy Ong (王雷明), Singaporean bowler
- Ong Soh Khim (王素琴), former Singaporean Nominated Member of Parliament
- Ong Teck Chin (王德進/王德进), Singaporean educator
- Melvyn Ong (王賜吉/王赐吉), Singapore army general and the current Chief of Defence Force of the Singapore Armed Forces
- Glenn Ong (王書佳/王书佳), Singaporean radio DJ
- Olivia Ong (王儷婷/王俪婷), Singaporean singer and actress
- Wang Sa (王沙), Singaporean comedian
- Wang Weiliang (王偉良/王伟良), Singaporean actor and singer
- Ong Yeow Tian (王耀添), Singaporean convicted killer
- Wang Xiuyun (王秀雲/王秀云), Singaporean actress

=== In non-Asian countries ===
==== Australia ====
- Beverley Wang, radio broadcaster and producer
- Wang Gungwu (王賡武/王赓武), historian, sinologist, and writer

==== Austria ====
- Cilli Wang, dancer and performer

==== Canada ====
- Janet Wang, Canadian visual artist and educator based in Vancouver
- Jeremy Wang (born 1991), better known by his pseudonym Disguised Toast, streamer and Internet personality
- Miranda Wang (born 1994), tech entrepreneur
- Richard Wang, chess player
- Riley Wang (王以綸), Canadian actor, singer and former member of Taiwanese boyband SpeXial
- Suning Wang (王蘇寧/王苏宁), Chinese-born chemist
- Vincent Wang, competitive video game player

==== Norway ====
- Sølvi Wang, singer, actress and comedian

==== United States ====
- Amy Wang, table tennis player
- An-Ming Wang, Chinese-American composer
- Angela Wang (born 1996), figure skater
- Alexander Wang (王大仁), fashion designer
- An Wang (王安), Chinese-American computer scientist who founded Wang Laboratories
- Daniel I.C. Wang (王義翹/王义翘), Chinese American professor
- Ed Wang (王凱/王凯), American football player
- Garrett Wang (王以瞻), Chinese American actor
- Iris Wang (born 1994), badminton player
- Izaac Wang (born 2007), American actor
- Joanna Wang (王若琳), Taiwanese-American singer-songwriter
- Wang Ju-Rong (王若琳), Chinese Muslim martial artist
- Kris Wang, former mayor of Cupertino, California
- Leehom Wang (王力宏), Taiwanese-American singer-songwriter, actor and commercial model
- Linda Wang (王憲苓/王宪苓), actress
- Lulu Wang (王子逸), filmmaker
- Qingde Wang (王青德), professor
- Shuping Wang (王淑平), Chinese-American medical researcher and public health whistleblower
- Stephen Wang, a founder of Rotten Tomatoes
- Taylor Wang (王赣骏/王贛駿), Chinese-American astronaut
- Vera Wang (王薇薇), fashion designer
- Wayne Wang (王穎/王颖), film director
- Xiaofeng Wang (王曉峯/王晓峰), computer scientist
- Yuan Wang (王沅), Chinese-American mathematician specializing in control theory

==== United Kingdom ====
- Phil Wang, comedian
- Stephen Wei-Jon Wang (born 1966), Roman Catholic bishop

== Fictional people ==
- Evelyn Quan Wang, character from Everything Everywhere All At Once (2022)
- Joy Wang, character from Everything Everywhere All At Once (2022)
- Lo Wang, character from video game Shadow Warrior
- Nina Wáng, character from anime My-Otome
- Paul Wang, character from Space: Above and Beyond (1995)
- Socqueline Wang, character from Miraculous: Tales of Ladybug & Cat Noir
- Waymond Wang, character from Everything Everywhere All At Once (2022)
- Wang Ai Ling, character from Lilo & Stitch (2002)
- Wang Chiang, character from Moorim School (2016)
- Wang Jinrei, character from video game Tekken
- Wang Liu Mei, character from anime Mobile Suit Gundam 00
- Wang Lung, character from the novel The Good Earth
- Wang Shizhen, character from manga Hikaru no Go
- Yao Wang, character from anime Hetalia (2009)

== See also ==
- List of common Chinese surnames
- Wang Wang and Funi, two pandas in Adelaide Zoo, South Australia
- Whang, surname
- Vương, the equivalent surname in Vietnamese
- Wang (disambiguation)

== Sources ==
- Yuan (袁), Yida (義達) (2002). Chinese Surnames, Group Heredity and Spread of Population (中国姓氏·群体遗传和人口分布). Huadong Training College Publishing Group (華東師範大學出版社). ISBN 7-5617-2769-0.
- Zhang (臧), Lihe (勵和) (1998). The Great Dictionary of Chinese Names (中國人名大辭典), updated by Xu Shitian (許師慎). The Commercial Press (商務印書館). ISBN 7-100-02555-9.
