= Jinjiazhuang Tunnel =

World's longest highway spiral tunnel

- Interactive map of Jinjiazhuang Tunnel

Overview
- Location: Chicheng, Zhangjiakou, China
- Coordinates: 40.8989°N 115.5486°E
- Status: Active
- Route: S3801 Beijing-Chongli Expressway
- Start: Zhuanlou village, Chicheng
- End: Zhuanlou village, Chicheng

Operation
- Operator: Hebei Expressways

Technical
- Length: 4,228 m (13,871 ft) (left tube) 4,104 m (13,465 ft) (right tube)
- No. of lanes: Two in each tunnel
- Operating speed: Speed limit: 80 km/h (50 mph)
- Grade: 2%

Jinjiazhuang Tunnel (Chinese: 金家庄隧道) or Jinjiazhuang Spiral Tunnel (Chinese: 金家庄螺旋隧道), is the world's longest highway spiral tunnel. The spiral has a curve radius of 860 metres (2,820 ft) and the elevation difference between the tunnel entrance and exit is 112 metres (367 ft).

The tunnel is on S3801 Beijing-Chongli Expressway. The Expressway is the main route from the Yanqing cluster to the Chongli cluster of the Beijing 2022 Winter Olympics.
