= Vuong =

Surname

Vương
- Language: Vietnamese

Vương or Vuong (Chữ Nôm: 王) is a Vietnamese surname

In the United States, Vuong was the 7,635th most common surname during the 1990 census and the 4,556th most common during the 2000 census.

== Notable people ==
- Vương Văn Đông, Army of the Republic of Vietnam colonel, staged the 1960 South Vietnamese coup attempt
- Vương Kiêm Toàn (born 1902), Vietnamese literacy educator
- Vương Tiến Dũng (born 1949), Vietnamese football coach
- Vương Đình Huệ (born 1957), Vietnamese politician, Minister of Finance (2011 – 2013), Deputy Prime Minister (from 2016)
- Vương Trung Hiếu (born 1959), Vietnamese writer
- Vương Anh Tuấn (born 1959), Vietnamese economist, General Director of Hotel Continental Saigon, deputy director of Saigontourist (Tổng công ty Du lịch Sài Gòn)
- Vương Thị Huyền (born 1992), Vietnamese Olympic weightlifter
- Ocean Vuong (born 1988), American poet
- Quang Vuong, American economist, creator of Vuong's closeness test
- Vương Quang Khải, founder of Zalo
- Vicky Vuong, Canadian sneaker artist
