= Wuhan Art Museum (Qintai) =

Art museum in Wuhan, China

- 武汉美术馆（琴台馆）
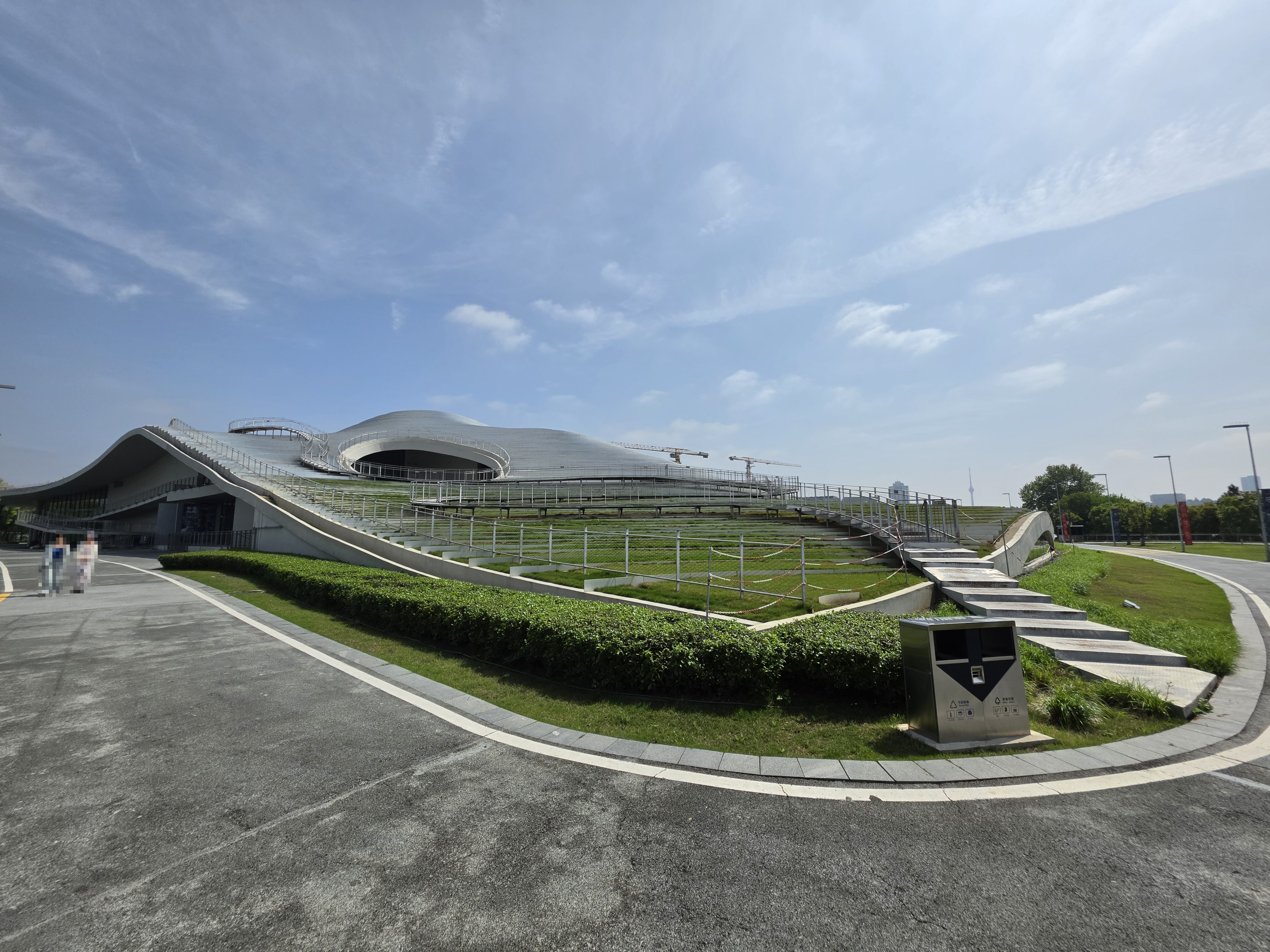
- View of the Wuhan Art Museum (Qintai) from the south
- Established: 2022
- Location: Hanyang District, Wuhan, Hubei, China
- Coordinates: 30.5635°N 114.2535°E
- Type: Art museum
- Website: Official website

Wuhan Art Museum (Qintai) (Chinese: 武汉美术馆（琴台馆）; pinyin: Wǔhàn Měishùguǎn (Qíntái Guǎn)) is an art museum in Wuhan, Hubei, China, located in Hanyang District close to Moon Lake. It opened on 28 December 2022. The museum is a branch of the Wuhan Art Museum in Jiang'an District. According to the China News Service, the building at the time of the museum's opening was "the largest single structure in China built using exposed concrete".
