= Baicao =

Baicao 白草镇
- Town
- Báicǎo Zhèn
- Location in Hebei Location in China
- Coordinates: 41°07′13″N 116°05′11″E
- Country: People's Republic of China
- Province: Hebei
- Prefecture-level city: Zhangjiakou
- County: Chicheng

Area
  - Total: 258.5 km^{2} (99.8 sq mi)

Population (2010)
  - Total: 7,512
  - Density: 29.06/km^{2} (75.3/sq mi)
- Time zone: UTC+8 (China Standard)

Baicao (Chinese: 白草镇; pinyin: Báicǎo Zhèn) is a town located in Chicheng County, Zhangjiakou, Hebei, China. According to the 2010 census, Baicao had a population of 7,512, including 3,934 males and 3,578 females. The population was distributed as follows: 1,333 people aged under 14, 5,016 people aged between 15 and 64, and 1,163 people aged over 65.

== See also ==
- List of township-level divisions of Hebei
