= Dahaituo Township =

Dahaituo Township 大海陀乡
- Rural Township
- Dàhăituó Xiāng
- Location in Hebei Location in China
- Coordinates: 40°40′23″N 115°43′34″E
- Country: People's Republic of China
- Province: Hebei
- Prefecture-level city: Zhangjiakou
- County: Chicheng

Area
  - Total: 251.4 km^{2} (97.1 sq mi)

Population (2010)
  - Total: 7,548
  - Density: 30.02/km^{2} (77.8/sq mi)
- Time zone: UTC+8 (China Standard)

Dahaituo Township (Chinese: 大海陀乡; pinyin: Dàhăituó Xiāng) is a rural township located in Chicheng County, Zhangjiakou, Hebei, China. According to the 2010 census, Dahaituo Township had a population of 7,548, including 4,022 males and 3,526 females. The population was distributed as follows: 1,219 people aged under 14, 5,269 people aged between 15 and 64, and 1,060 people aged over 65.

== See also ==
- List of township-level divisions of Hebei
