= Dongmao =

Dongmao 东卯镇
- Town
- Dōngmǎo Zhèn
- Location in Hebei Location in China
- Coordinates: 40°50′19″N 116°15′44″E
- Country: People's Republic of China
- Province: Hebei
- Prefecture-level city: Zhangjiakou
- County: Chicheng

Area
  - Total: 447.3 km^{2} (172.7 sq mi)

Population (2010)
  - Total: 15,743
  - Density: 35.2/km^{2} (91/sq mi)
- Time zone: UTC+8 (China Standard)

Dongmao (Chinese: 东卯镇; pinyin: Dōngmǎo Zhèn) is a town located in Chicheng County, Zhangjiakou, Hebei, China. According to the 2010 census, Dongmao had a population of 15,743, including 8,341 males and 7,402 females. The population was distributed as follows: 2,972 people aged under 14, 10,727 people aged between 15 and 64, and 2,044 people aged over 65.

== See also ==
- List of township-level divisions of Hebei
