= Diao'e =

Diao'e 雕鹗镇
- Town
- Diāo'è Zhèn
- Location in Hebei Location in China
- Coordinates: 40°43′19″N 115°48′49″E
- Country: People's Republic of China
- Province: Hebei
- Prefecture-level city: Zhangjiakou
- County: Chicheng

Area
  - Total: 382.8 km^{2} (147.8 sq mi)

Population (2010)
  - Total: 11,631
  - Density: 30.39/km^{2} (78.7/sq mi)
- Time zone: UTC+8 (China Standard)

Diao'e (Chinese: 雕鹗镇; pinyin: Diāo'è Zhèn) is a town located in Chicheng County, Zhangjiakou, Hebei, China. According to the 2010 census, Diao'e had a population of 11,631, including 6,213 males and 5,418 females. The population was distributed as follows: 2,107 people aged under 14, 7,958 people aged between 15 and 64, and 1,566 people aged over 65.

== See also ==
- List of township-level divisions of Hebei
