= Ciyingzi Township =

Ciyingzi Township 茨营子乡
- Rural Township
- Cíyíngzi Xiāng
- Location in Hebei Location in China
- Coordinates: 40°54′51″N 116°11′18″E
- Country: People's Republic of China
- Province: Hebei
- Prefecture-level city: Zhangjiakou
- County: Chicheng County

Area
  - Total: 255.3 km^{2} (98.6 sq mi)

Population (2010)
  - Total: 7,474
  - Density: 29.27/km^{2} (75.8/sq mi)
- Time zone: UTC+8 (China Standard)

Ciyingzi Township (Chinese: 茨营子乡; pinyin: Cíyíngzi Xiāng) is a rural township located in Chicheng County, Zhangjiakou, Hebei, China. According to the 2010 census, Ciyingzi Township had a population of 7,474, including 3,924 males and 3,550 females. The population was distributed as follows: 1,246 people aged under 14, 5,236 people aged between 15 and 64, and 992 people aged over 65.

== See also ==
- List of township-level divisions of Hebei
