= Jizi (artist) =

Chinese artist

- 姬子 (in Chinese)
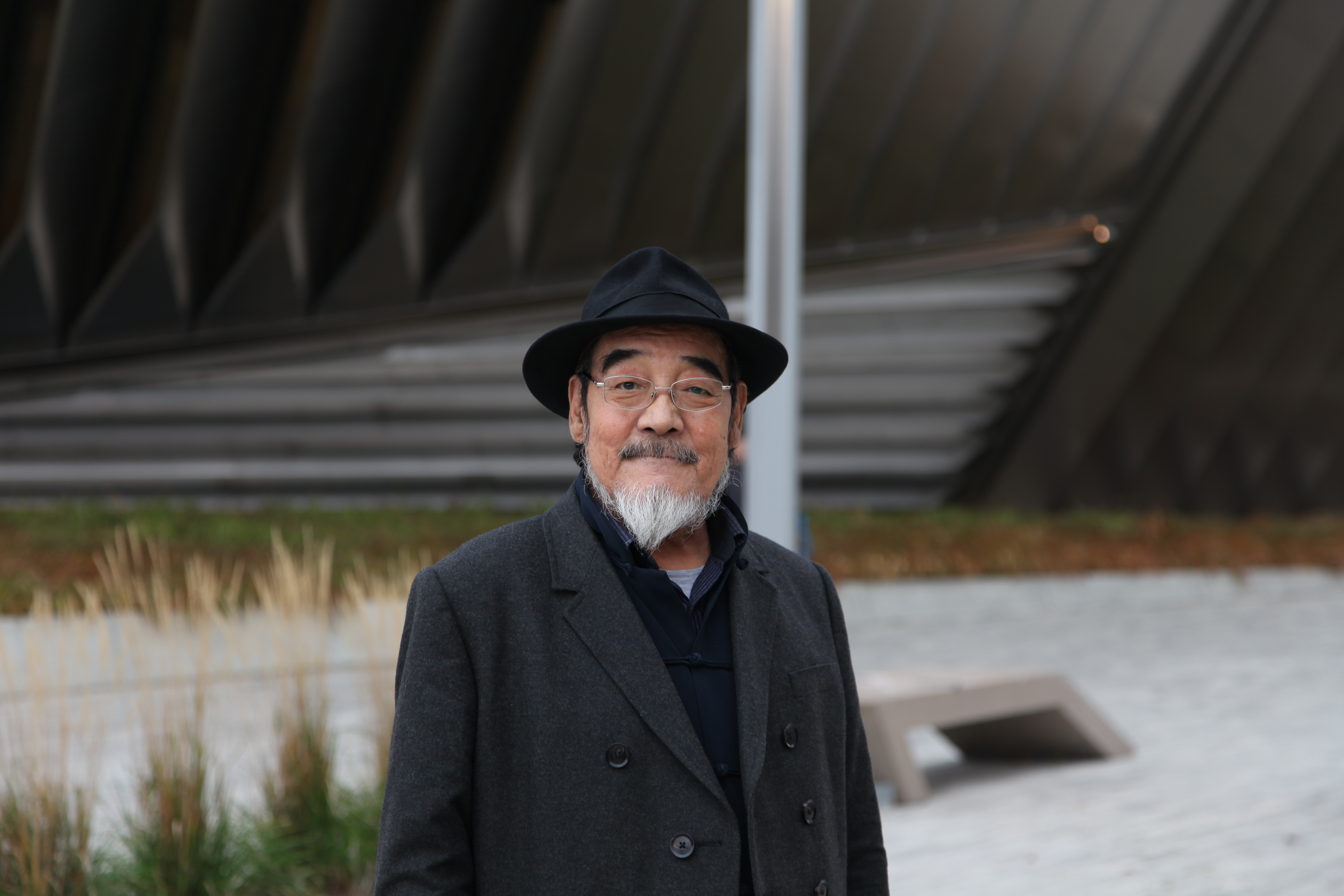
- Jizi in 2014
- Born: Yunshan Wang; March 3, 1941; Longguan County, Chahar Province (now Hebei), China
- Died: July 8, 2015 (aged 74); Beijing, China
- Known for: Ink painting
- Notable work: Original Beginnings (元初)
- Style: Landscape painting

Jizi (3 March 1941 – 8 July 2015, Chinese: 姬子, birth name Wang Yunshan) was a Chinese ink painter.

== Overview ==
Yunshan Wang was born in Longguan County of Chahar Province (which was merged into Hebei Province in 1952) on 3 March 1941, and died on 8 July 2015 in Beijing. In 1959, Jizi moved from Longguan County to Xuanhua. From 1959 until 2000, Jizi lived in Xuanhua. From 2000, he lived in Beijing until he died in 2015.

Jizi began painting in the late 1950s. During the Cultural Revolution, he made portraits of Chairman Mao. In the 1980s, Jizi, like many artists at the time, questioned the future of Chinese painting and the creative possibilities of brush and ink. This led him to explore what he called the "Dao of Ink Landscapes", referencing the philosophies of Laozi and Zhuangzi to emphasize the spirituality of Chinese landscape painting. He used layered ink, multiple optical effects, and a free assemblage of different forms in an attempt to capture the continuous transformation of natural phenomena such as water and clouds. His works have been described as "macroscopic".

== Career and philosophy ==
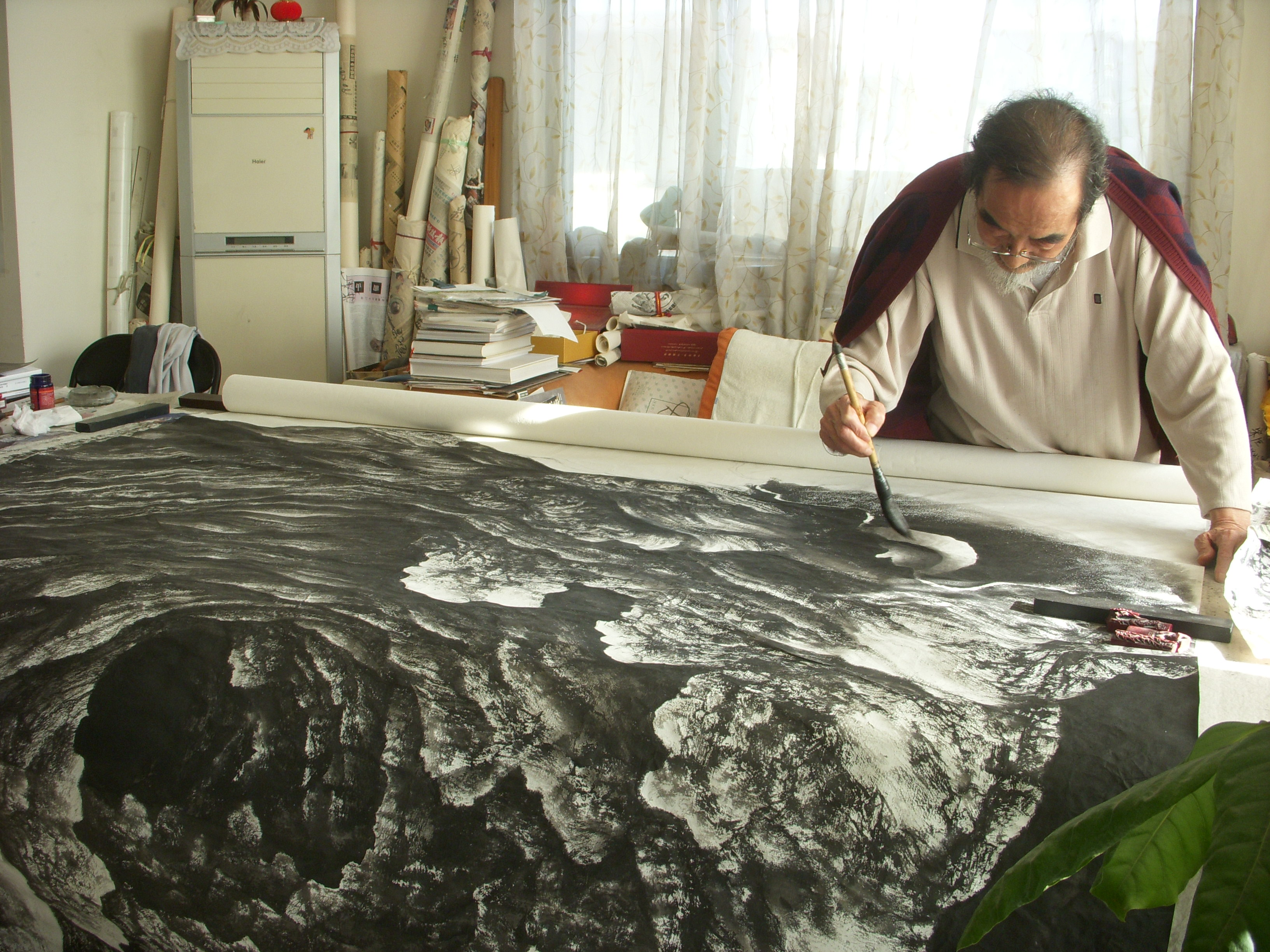
Jizi working in his Beijing studio in 2010

Jizi had an almost half-century career that spanned a dynamic period of Chinese history, in Xuanhua and Beijing. In the last quarter of the 20th century, some Chinese scholars, critics, and artists decried traditional Chinese painting as out of step with an increasingly global world culture. Jizi countered that assertion, arguing that painting could indeed be authentically Chinese in terms of traditional techniques and styles, and still address the present-day needs of individuals everywhere. The artworks displayed in the travelling exhibition "Jizi: Journey of the Spirit" reveal the artist's decades-long search for this synthesis of techniques, styles, philosophies, and ideas that honour tradition, reinforce the ideal of a universal oneness of all things, and embrace personal expression.

In his early years as an artist, Jizi embraced Maoist socialist realism—an ideology that rejected spirituality outright. In the aftermath of Mao's death in 1976 and the attendant shift in the nature of the Chinese Communist Party's concept of socialism, Jizi began exploring means to reintroduce the concept of spirit. After experimenting with a variety of theories and methods, Jizi settled on his own practice, which he called "Dao of Ink Painting". Dao (or Tao) is a fundamental principle of ancient Chinese philosophy that emphasizes harmony with nature. Ink painting is a traditional technique with origins in ancient China; it is a practice in which paintings are created with black ink and a brush. Caught up in the problem of contemporary art, often read as Western, and its relationship to the long and venerated tradition of Chinese painting, Jizi's journey was one of commitment to the time-honoured and to the inventive—the philosophical and material. Believing that the two approaches could meaningfully coexist, Jizi searched for a new way of painting.

In his writings, Jizi explained the intertwining of meanings in the series titled Dao of Ink Landscapes: "The Dao is the spirit of the great universe. What I seek as an artist is the unification of Heaven and Earth and Humanity, insight into the Dao, the material universe, and myself." Thus his work expresses the classical aesthetic principle that heaven and the human are one, as well as the thought that humans initiate relations that transform both the powers of heaven and earthly environments. Commentators emphasize that Jizi's paintings express Chinese traditional philosophy in ways that connect thoughts of unity or oneness with contemporary times: "Jizi seeks to remain true to the cultural, spiritual, and philosophical roots of his homeland and yet speaks forcefully and eloquently about the new realities of modern life." His art breaches conventions of both traditional Chinese art and modern western art "by going to the outer reaches of the cosmos and down to where matter is raw…" At the same time, his paintings "confront audiences with a sensuous apprehension of the world, one that forces the viewer to confront the meaning of individual existence…" This approach to painting, which connects the cosmos with individual human existence, "has transformed ink wash painting in ways that combine the philosophical position of the literati artist with a painting style of controlled chaos." One painting especially conveys the theme of energy: "The Epic of Nature is cinematic, a cavalcade of nature…offering a symbolic record of heaven and earth, and humanity." Jizi's hills have been compared to dragons: "When they do wake up, and stand on their heavy legs, the ground above them will split, and chasms will open up."

== Exhibitions and collections ==
Works by Jizi have been shown at the following exhibitions:

- Jizi: Journey of the Spirit, Weisman Art Museum, Minnesota, United States (2017)
- Jizi: Journey of the Spirit, WhiteBox, New York, United States (2018)
- Su Xinping, Weng Yunpeng & Jizi: A Moment In Beijing, Museum of Contemporary Art, Jacksonville, Florida, United States (2020)
- A Glimpse of Jizi's Ink World, Shandong Art Museum, Shandong, China (2021)
- Strange Wonders: Jizi and pioneers of contemporary ink from China, SOAS Gallery, London, United Kingdom (2024)

The work Original Beginnings (元初) was in Jizi's possession from its production in 2007 until his death. It was kept in Beijing and then donated to the British Museum collections in 2020.

== See also ==
- Ink painting
- Jizi

== Bibliography ==
- Brubaker, David Adam; Wang, Chunchen (2015). Jizi and His Art in Contemporary China: Unification. Chinese Contemporary Art Series. Springer. doi:10.1007/978-3-662-44929-5. ISBN 978-3-662-44928-8.
- Wang, Chunchen, ed. (2015). Jizi – When Spirituality Becomes Form. Guongdong Museum of Art and Whitebox Art Center. ISBN 978-7535673787.
