= Vương Kiêm Toàn =

Vietnamese literacy educator recognized by UNESCO (1902–1990)

Vuong Kiem Toan
- Vương Kiêm Toàn
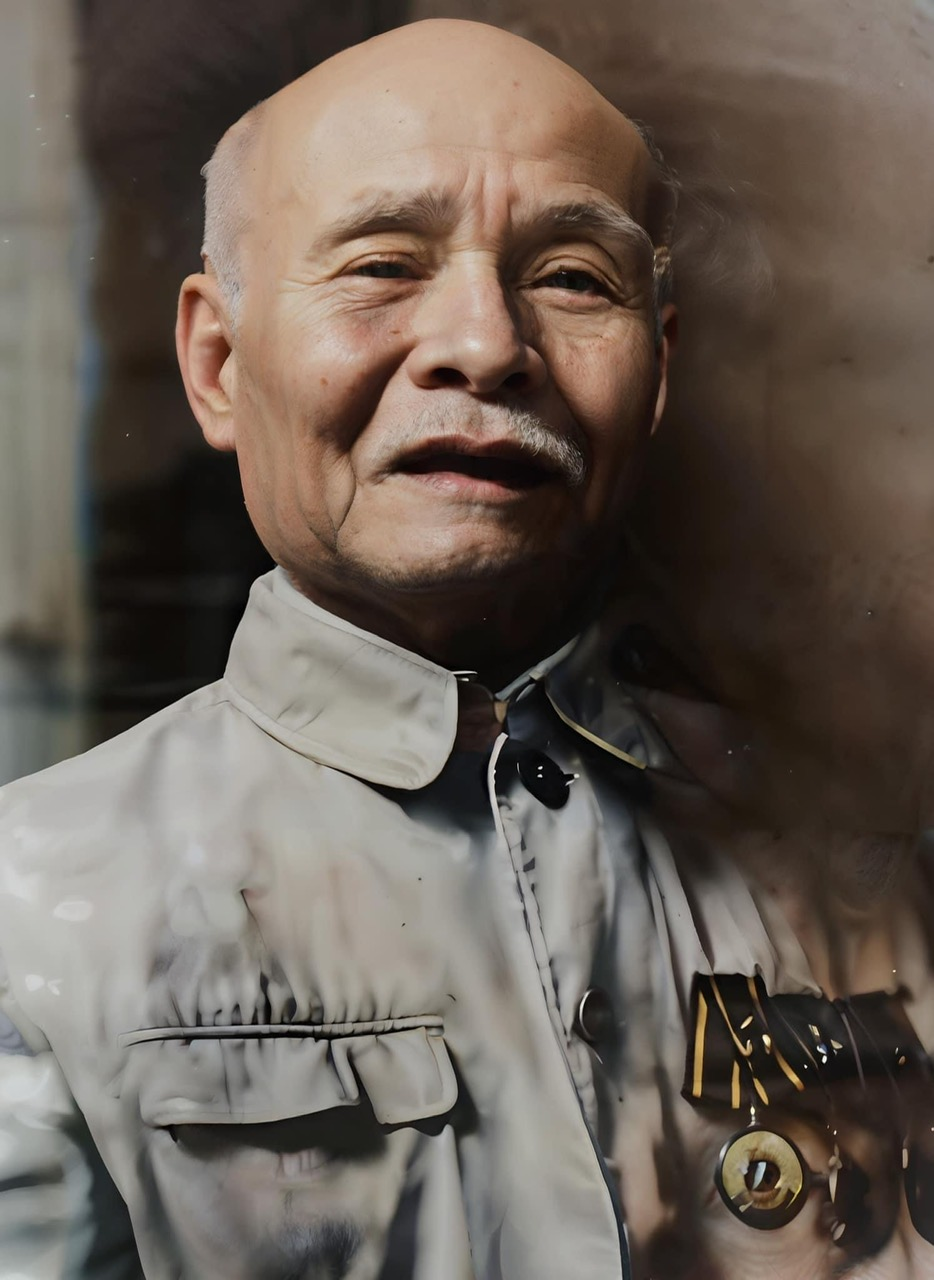
- Born: March 12, 1902; Hương Ngải commune, Thạch Thất district, Hà Tây province, French Indochina
- Died: March 30, 1990 (aged 88); Hà Nội, Vietnam
- Citizenship: Vietnamese
- Occupations: Educator; civil servant
- Known for: His role as the Director of the Bình dân học vụ (Bureau of Popular Education); His contribution to reducing illiteracy in Vietnam; UNESCO recognition (1983)

Vương Kiêm Toàn (12 March 1902 – 30 March 1990) was a Vietnamese educator who, for many decades, contributed to the fight against illiteracy, as well as to teaching and the publication of school books. He served as Director-General of the Nha Bình dân học vụ (Bureau of Popular Education) and received a bằng khen danh dự (honorary certificate) from UNESCO in 1983 for contributions to literacy.

== Early life ==
Vương Kiêm Toàn was born on 12 March 1902 in Hương Ngải commune, Thạch Thất district, Hà Tây province (now part of Hanoi), Vietnam.

== Career ==
After the August Revolution of 1945, more than 90% of the Vietnamese population was illiterate. The movement to combat illiteracy was initiated by the young Vietnamese government led by President Hồ Chí Minh to improve education and literacy across the country.

Following the death of the first director, Nguyễn Công Mỹ (1909–1949), who died due to French bombardment, Vương Kiêm Toàn was assigned as the second Director-General of the Nha Bình dân học vụ (Bureau of Popular Education) in 1949.

He worked on nationwide literacy campaigns associated with the Bình dân học vụ movement, focusing on adult education and eradication of illiteracy.

During his career, Vương Kiêm Toàn was financially awarded by President Hồ Chí Minh (date unknown) with 2,000 Vietnamese đồng. Part of this money was used to publish Vietnamese-language books for a minority community in Vietnam (the Thai people), and the remainder was dedicated to literacy campaigns in 21 northern mountainous provinces during the 1956–1958 period, helping to combat illiteracy in remote areas.

== UNESCO recognition ==
In 1983, UNESCO recognized Vương Kiêm Toàn with an honorary certificate associated with the UNESCO Nadezhda K. Krupskaya literacy prize program, highlighting his long service to literacy in Viet Nam.

== Awards ==
- Huân chương Lao động hạng nhất (First-class Labour Medal), awarded by the Government of Viet Nam.
- Honorary certificate from UNESCO (1983), associated with the Nadezhda K. Krupskaya Literacy Prize program.

== Legacy ==
Vương Kiêm Toàn has been referenced in Vietnamese media and commemorations of the Bình dân học vụ movement for his role in fighting with illiteracy and popular education.

In August and September 2025, the Vietnamese History Museum in Hanoi hosted an exhibition about Bình dân học vụ, featuring documents, photographs and other items, some of which were donated by Mr. Vuong's family.

== Death ==
Vương Kiêm Toàn died on March 30, 1990, in Hanoi.

== See also ==
- List of international literacy prizes
- UNESCO Nadezhda K. Krupskaya literacy prize
