= Wang Fengchao =

Chinese politician (born 1965)

- 王凤朝

Mayor of Chengdu
- In office September 2020 – November 2025
- Preceded by: Luo Qiang
- Succeeded by: Chen Shuping

Vice Governor of Sichuan
- In office September 2019 – August 2020
- Governor: Yin Li

Personal details
- Born: December 1965 (age 60) Zhongjiang County, Sichuan, China
- Party: Chinese Communist Party (1986-2026, expelled)
- Education: University of Electronic Science and Technology of China

Chinese name
- Simplified Chinese: 王凤朝
- Traditional Chinese: 王凤朝
Transcriptions
Standard Mandarin
- Hanyu Pinyin: Wáng Fèngcháo

Wang Fengchao (Chinese: 王凤朝; born December 1965) is a former Chinese politician who spent his entire career in his home-province Sichuan. As of November 2025 he was under investigation by China's top anti-graft watchdog. Previously he served as mayor of Chengdu and before that, vice governor of Sichuan.

Wang was a representative of the 20th National Congress of the Chinese Communist Party and a delegate to the 13th and 14th National People's Congress.

== Early life and education ==
Wang was born in Zhongjiang County, Sichuan in December 1965. He enrolled at the Chengdu Institute of Radio Engineering (now the University of Electronic Science and Technology of China), majoring in radio-specific mechanical equipment in the Department of Electronic Mechanics. Upon graduation, he joined the Chinese Communist Party (CCP) in January 1986.

== Career ==
After university in July 1986, Wang commenced his professional career as a trainee in Workshop No. 9 at Changhong Machine Factory, and advanced to the role of designer in the Structural Office of the Second Design Institute at Changhong by September 1987, a position he held until April 1993. His managerial career began in April 1993 when he was appointed deputy director of the 2nd Design Institute at Changhong Machine Factory and Changhong Electric Co., Ltd. He was certified as an engineer in November of the same year. In March 1994, he transitioned to operational management, serving successively as director of the Production Planning Department and director of the Quality and Production Department. In August 1996, he entered the senior leadership of the company, being promoted to vice factory director of Changhong Machine Factory and vice general manager of Changhong Electric Co., Ltd. His responsibilities expanded significantly during this period, concurrently heading the Air Conditioner Product Division from December 1996 and serving as chief dispatcher of the Production Planning and Dispatch Center from August 1999. He attained the title of senior engineer in November 1998. His executive roles continued to grow with his appointment as director of Sichuan Changhong Electronic Group Co., Ltd. and vice chairman and executive vice general manager of Changhong Electric Co., Ltd. in May 2000. He was further elevated to vice chairman and executive president of the listed company in February 2001. In July 2004, he was promoted again to vice chairman of the parent group and general manager of the listed subsidiary, a key leadership position he held until September 2005.

In September 2005, Wang got involved in politics, when he was appointed vice mayor of the Neijiang. In October 2007, he was made deputy director of the Sichuan Provincial State-owned Assets Supervision and Administration Commission (SASAC).

In November 2010, Wang moved into the aviation sector, joining Sichuan Airlines Group Co., Ltd. as vice chairman and general manager, concurrently serving as deputy party secretary since August 2011. He rose to the top leadership of Sichuan Airlines Group in December 2013, becoming its chairman and party secretary. In June 2015, he concurrently served as chairman and party secretary of Sichuan Development (Holdings) Co., Ltd. Since February 2017, he also concurrently served as chairman and party secretary of the newly established Sichuan Financial Holding Group Co., Ltd.

In September 2019, Wang was appointed vice governor of Sichuan, although he remained chairman and party secretary of Sichuan Development (Holdings) Co., Ltd. and chairman and party secretary of Sichuan Financial Holding Group Co., Ltd. In July 2020, his career took another pivotal turn. He became deputy party secretary of Chengdu, in addition to serving as vice mayor and acting mayor. He was confirmed as mayor in September 2020.

== Downfall ==
On 26 November 2025, Wang was suspected of "serious violations of laws and regulations" by the Central Commission for Discipline Inspection (CCDI), the party's internal disciplinary body, and the National Supervisory Commission, the highest anti-corruption agency of China. Wang was expelled from the party and dismissed from the public office on 5 June 2026.

Government offices
Preceded by Luo Qiang	Mayor of Chengdu; 2020–2025	Succeeded by Chen Shuping
