= Wuhan Art Museum =

- 武漢美術館
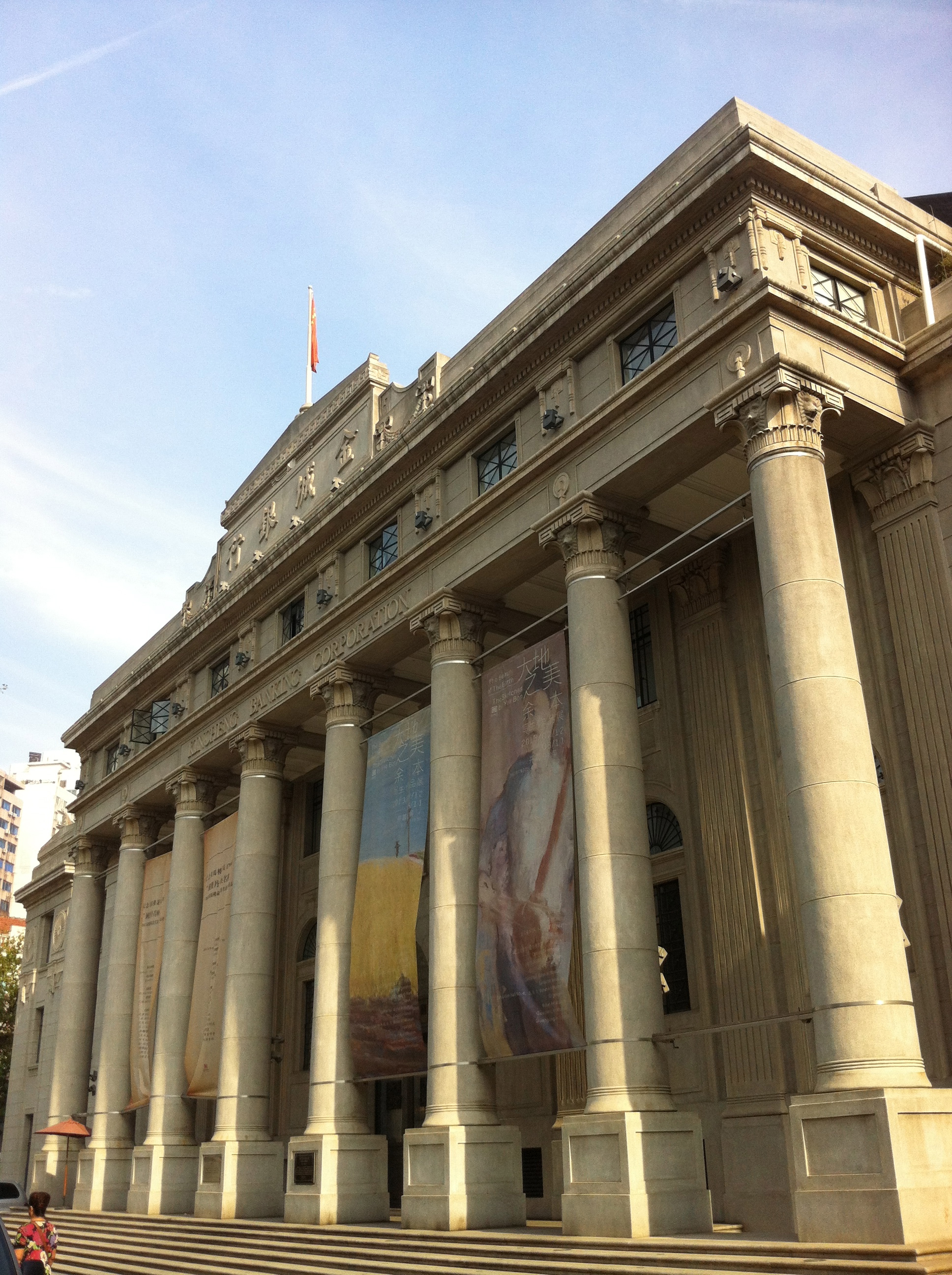
- Front facade of the museum
- Established: 12 December 1986; 39 years ago
- Location: Jiang'an District, Wuhan, Hubei, China
- Coordinates: 30.58372°N 114.29285°E
- Type: Public art museum
- Key holdings: Modern art, contemporary art
- Collections: Chinese art

Wuhan Art Museum (Chinese: 武漢美術館) is a publicly-run art museum in Wuhan, Hubei, China, covering Chinese contemporary art and modern art.

== Overview ==
Wuhan Art Museum was founded on 12 December 1986. In 2008, it moved to the new museum site where the former Kincheng Bank building was situated between Zhongshan Avenue and Baohua Street in the Hankou area of the city. The new museum building has five stories and a total area of 12,139m^{2}. The atrium on the first (ground-level) floor has a ring corridor structure, forming the architectural hub of the building. The second and the third floors provide the main exhibition areas, including seven exhibition halls, with an area of around 4,230m^{2}. The fourth and the fifth floors respectively include offices and a lecture hall. There are also a reading room, repair room, training classroom, and space to preserve artworks and undertake academic research, art education, etc.

== Collections ==
The museum maintains collections of contemporary and modern art. The museum's art collection is based on domestic artworks, with over a thousand works by nearly 200 artists from across China, especially from the Hubei province. Works cover traditional Chinese painting, oil painting, photography, sculpture, watercolors, etc.

== Exhibitions ==
The museum has special exhibitions. For example, the following biennale events on the ink and wash style of art were curated by Wang Chunchen:

- Ink Attack: The First Wuhan Ink and Wash Biennale (2017)
- Ink and Object: The Second Wuhan Ink and Wash Biennale (2019)

== See also ==
- Hubei Museum of Art in Wuhan
