= Wang Jibing =

Chinese poet (born 1969)

- 王计兵
- Wang in 2026
- Born: November 1969 (age 56–57); Xuzhou, Jiangsu, China
- Occupations: food delivery driver; poet
- Spouse: Guo Yiyun
- Children: 3
- Writing career
- Pen name: Shi Huang
- Language: Chinese
- Notable work: Man in a Hurry

Wang Jibing (Chinese: 王计兵; pinyin: Wángjìbīng; born November 1969), also known by his pen name Shi Huang (Chinese: 拾荒, "Scavenger"), is a Chinese poet and food delivery driver. Widely known as the "delivery rider poet", he won the Lu Xun Literary Prize in 2026.

Wang was born in Xuzhou to a peasant family was forced to drop out of high school to help support his family. After leaving his hometown, he worked multiple jobs before working as a food delivery driver in 2019. In 2022, his poem Man in a Hurry, inspired by an experience where a customer entered the wrong address, went viral on Chinese social media after another poet named Chen Chaohua shared his poem on Sina Weibo. Afterwards, he released many of his poetry collections under various publishing houses after his popularity boom.

== Early life ==
Wang was born in 1969 in Pizhou, Xuzhou, Jiangsu Province, to Wang Bingxian and Bao Chengzhen, a peasant family. Because of financial hardships, he was forced by his father to drop out of school at 14 during his second year in junior high to work on the family farm. In 1985, he left his hometown to work as a construction worker.

In 1992, in his early twenties, Wang returned to his hometown where he wrote a short story titled A Cart Enters the Village (Chinese: 小车进村), which was accepted and published on his first submission to the Zhengzhou-based magazine Baihuayuan (Hundred-Flower Garden). The story details the daily life of rural northern Jiangsu. Following this first success, he had more than a dozen works published in various magazines. In the same year, intent on writing a full-length novel, Wang devoted himself to writing and stayed indoors for several months instead of doing farm work. His father, viewing this as a neglect of his duties, burned his 200,000-character manuscript while Wang was away from the house. As a result, he did not speak to his father for several months.

Around 2002, nine years after his marriage to Guo Yiyun, Wang and his family left Pizhou and settled in Kunshan, where they stayed for at least 20 years. After several relocations, he opened up a small supermarket called "Jinyan Store" in the Xincheng Yu Garden near the Kunshan South railway station. Between 2009 and the years that followed, Wang work in a multitude of jobs, where he would collect scrap metal, build adobe houses, and sell fruit wholesale.

== Career ==
Wang started writing poetry around 2008. In 2009, his family purchased a computer, which provided a space for his manuscript. He started writing in Qzone (called QQSpace in China) under the online alias "Zhantai", (Note: Chinese: 站台; transl. "Platform") but would later be introduced to online poetry forums by a netizen named Hengzhi Lingxiang. In 2017, he began to submit his poems to various magazines, later adopting the pen name "Shi Huang", (Note: Chinese: 拾荒; transl. "Scavenger") to commemorate his years working as a scavenger. In 2018, Wang Jibing became a member of the Xuzhou Writers Association.

In 2019, facing difficulties in running his supermarket, Wang Jibing began working part-time as a food delivery rider in Kunshan. Tidying up his shop in the morning, he would take orders on the Ele.me platform (now Taobao Shangou) starting midday. At age 50, he was the oldest rider in his hub. In 2022, he wrote a poem titled Man in a Hurry, (Note: Chinese: 赶时间的人) which details the life of a food delivery driver. The poem was inspired by his experience in 2019, when he was given two wrong addresses and spent many hours running between three residential buildings and up multiple flights of stairs many times only to be greeted with an ungrateful customer. The poem quickly became viral, attracting 20 million views, 100,000 reposts, and tens of thousands of likes after being shared by poet Chen Chaohua on Sina Weibo. Users praised the poem, calling it a "song of the laborers", making it his most famous work. Several publishing houses approached Wang in the hopes of publishing a book; Wang picked Zhengu Books to release his poetry collection under the name Man in a Hurry: Poems of a Food Delivery Rider. The book contained over 180 poems made by Wang, and was later published in 2023. Later, two more poetry collections, titled I Clumsily Love This World (Note: Chinese: 我笨拙地爱着这个世界) and Low Flight (Note: Chinese: 低处飞行) would be released.

In December 2022, Wang announced in a People's Daily Online article that he became a member of the Chinese Communist Party in November of the same year.

In January 2025, Wang was invited by the production team for the 2025 CMG Spring Festival Gala to introduce Faye Wong's latest single My Gifts from the World. (Note: Chinese: 世界赠予我的) His fourth poem collection, titled Holding a Beam of Light from the World, (Note: Chinese: 手持人间一束光) was released that same month. In June 2025, he was nominated to serve as the vice president of the Xuzhou City National Reading Promotion Association.

At the end of January 2026, Wang's collection of non-fiction essays titled Chingzen, (Note: Chinese: 成珍) after his mother, was officially released. On July 15 that same year, Low Flight won him the poetry prize in the 9th Lu Xun Literary Prize. Despite winning the award, he said he is not willing to quit his job and is planning to work until he's 60.

Chow, explaining how Wang's work A Man In A Hurry resonated with many people, exclaimed that it's "because everybody has this experience".

== Personal life ==
Wang is married to Guo Yiyun. As of 2022, they have three children, with his eldest daughter having two children.

== Publications ==
- 2023: Man in a Hurry: Poems of a Food Delivery Rider, Zhengu Books
- 2023: I Clumsily Love This World, Jiangsu Phoenix Literature and Art Publishing House Co., Ltd.
- 2023: Flying Low, China National Publications Import and Export Co., Ltd.
- 2025: Holding a Beam of Light from the World, People's Literature Publishing House
- 2026: Chengzhen, Guangxi Normal University Press
