= Yunhong Wang =

Chinese computer scientist

Yunhong Wang (Chinese: 王蕴红) is a Chinese computer scientist and image processing researcher focused on the applications of computer vision in biometrics. She is a professor at Beihang University in its School of Computer Science and Engineering, and the director of the Laboratory of Intelligent Recognition and Image Processing and Beijing Key Laboratory of Digital Media.

== Education and career ==
Wang has a 1989 bachelor's degree in electronics engineering, from the Northwestern Polytechnical University in Xi'an. She continued her studies at the Nanjing University of Science and Technology, receiving a master's degree in 1995 and 1998.

From 1998 until 2004 she worked as a researcher in the National Laboratory of Pattern Recognition in the Institute of Automation of the Chinese Academy of Sciences. She has been a faculty member at Beihang University since 2004.

== Recognition ==
Wang was named as a Fellow of the International Association for Pattern Recognition in 2018, "for contributions to biometrics, computer vision, and pattern recognition". She was elected as an IEEE Fellow, in the 2020 class of fellows, "for contributions to iris and face recognition".
