= Vicky Vuong =

Vicky Vuong is a Canadian sneaker artist and former scientist who specializes in custom hand-painted footwear. She transitioned from a career in materials engineering to establishing her art practice, Cestlavic, where she creates wearable designs and collaborates with brands and public figures.

== Early life ==
Vuong was born in Canada to Chinese immigrant parents. She completed her undergraduate studies in molecular biology and later pursued a master's degree in materials engineering. Her upbringing emphasized a strong work ethic, though she expressed concern about disappointing her parents by not adhering to traditional career paths.

During her master's studies, Vuong began exploring her artistic interests. On a family vacation, she customized a pair of sneakers using fabric markers, which reignited her creativity and initiated her interest in sneaker art.

== Career ==
In 2014, Vuong sold her first pair of custom sneakers while balancing her art with her scientific career. Initially operating out of her basement apartment, she gradually built a clientele and gained attention online for her designs. Her side business eventually gained enough traction that in 2020 she transitioned to full-time sneaker artistry, establishing her company Cestlavic.

During the COVID-19 pandemic, Vuong leveraged social media to share her creative process and interact with a global audience. She collaborated with brands such as Froot Loops, eBay, Microsoft, Xbox, and Allbirds, and worked with clients including athletes like Cooper Kupp and Stephen Curry, and public figures like Viola Davis. Her sneakers have been displayed in a Toronto museum, the Bata Shoe Museum.

Vuong shared a studio in San Francisco with fellow sneaker artist Ann Duskus in 2021. They equipped the space as a workshop and content creation studio. Vuong co-hosts the podcast Best Foot Forward, where she discusses challenges faced by artists in the sneaker industry.
