= Longguan, Hebei =

Longguan 龙关镇
- Town
- Location in Hebei
- Coordinates: 40°47′10″N 115°34′43″E
- Country: People's Republic of China
- Province: Hebei
- Prefecture-level city: Zhangjiakou
- County: Chicheng
- Village-level divisions: 35 villages
- Elevation: 1,069 m (3,507 ft)
- Time zone: UTC+8 (China Standard)
- Area code: 0313

Longguan, Hebei
- Traditional Chinese: 龍關
- Simplified Chinese: 龙关
- Literal meaning: Dragon Pass
Transcriptions
Standard Mandarin
- Hanyu Pinyin: Lóngguān

Former names

Longmen
- Traditional Chinese: 龍門
- Simplified Chinese: 龙门
- Literal meaning: Dragon Gate
Transcriptions
Standard Mandarin
- Hanyu Pinyin: Lóngmén

Longguan, formerly known as Longmen, is a town in Chicheng County in northwestern Hebei Province, China, situated along China National Highway 112 around 58 kilometres (36 mi) east of downtown Zhangjiakou and 25 km (16 mi) southwest of the county seat as the crow flies. As of 2011, it has 35 villages under its administration.

== History ==
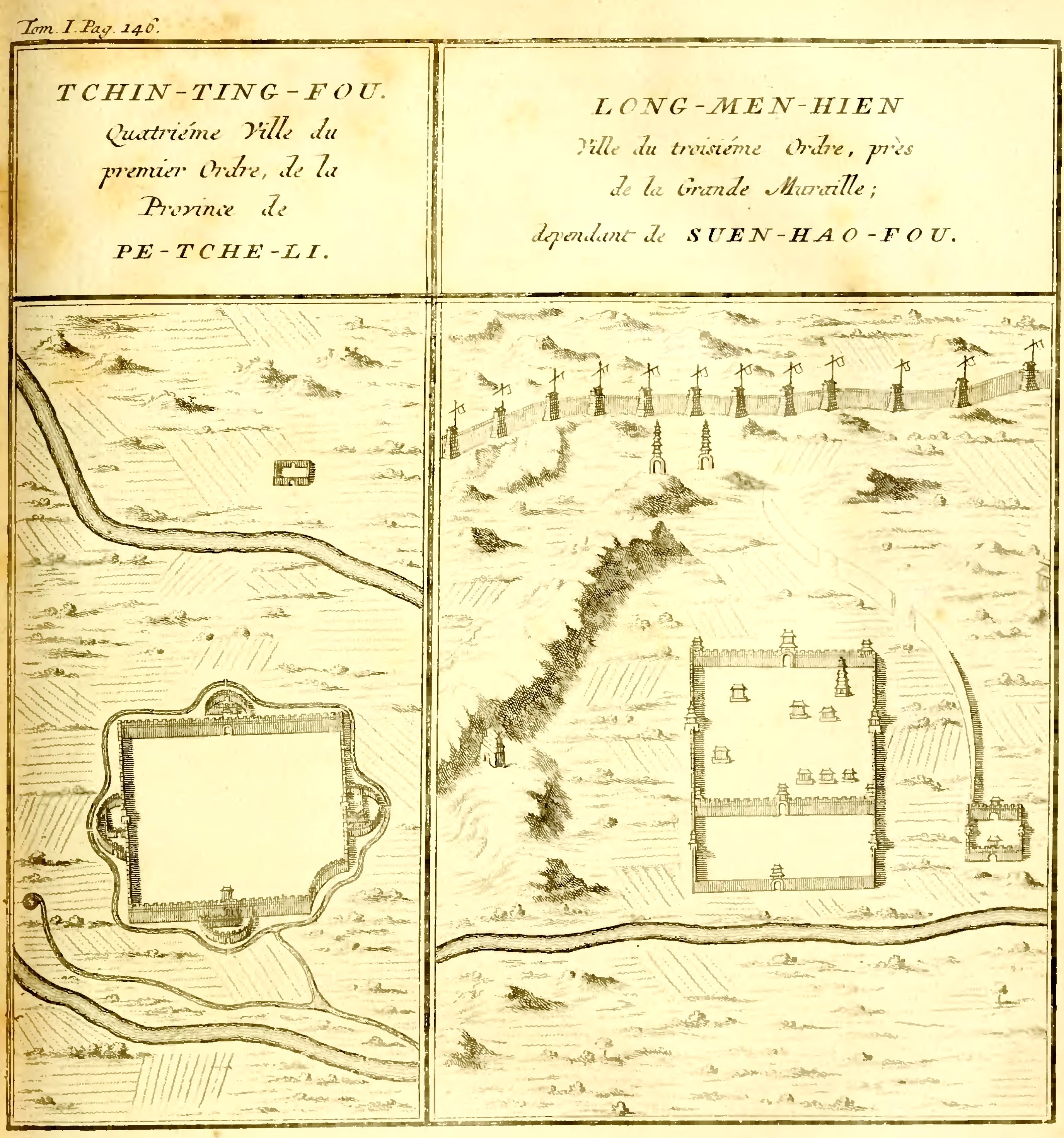
Maps of "Tchin-ting-fou" and "Long-men-hien" from Du Halde's 1735 Description of China, based on the accounts of Jesuit missionaries.

Under the name Longmen, the town was formerly the seat of a county under the administration of Xuanhua Prefecture during imperial times.

== See also ==
- List of township-level divisions of Hebei
