= Chicheng County =

Chicheng County 赤城县 Chihcheng
- County
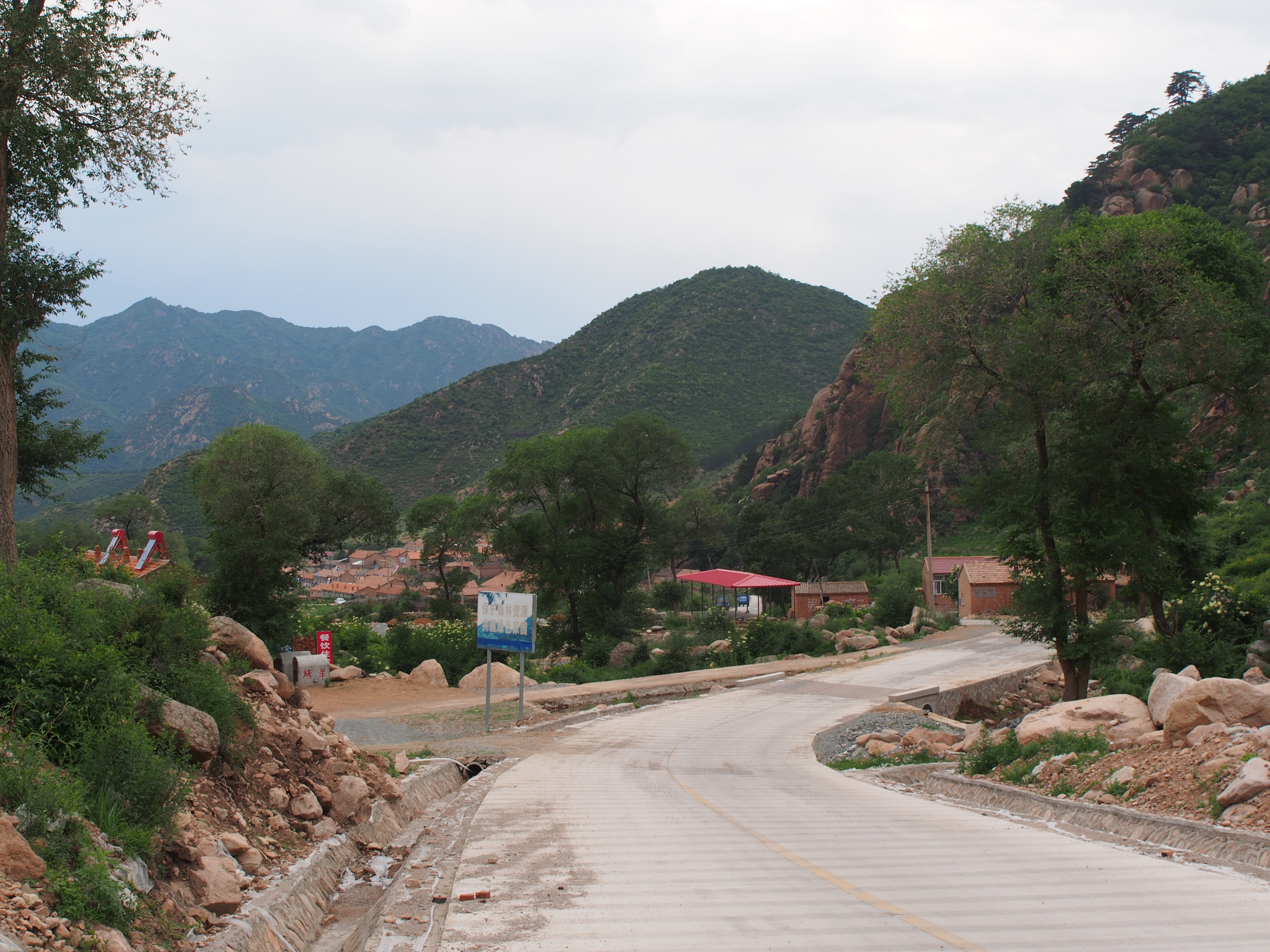
- Dahaituo

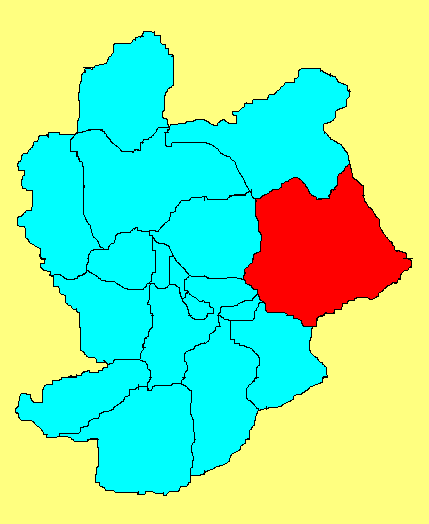
- Location in Zhangjiakou

- Location in Hebei
- Coordinates: 40°55′N 115°50′E
- Country: People's Republic of China
- Province: Hebei
- Prefecture-level city: Zhangjiakou
- County seat: Chicheng Town (赤城镇)

Area
  - Total: 5,287 km^{2} (2,041 sq mi)
- Elevation: 882 m (2,894 ft)

Population (2020)
  - Total: 197,919
  - Density: 37.44/km^{2} (96.96/sq mi)
- Time zone: UTC+8 (China Standard)
- Postal code: 075500
- Area code: 0313

Chicheng (Chinese: 赤城; pinyin: Chìchéng), or Ch’ih-ch’eng, is a county under the administration of Zhangjiakou City, northwestern Hebei province, bordering Beijing to the southeast. The total area of the county is 5,287 square kilometres (2,041 sq mi). The easternmost county-level division of Zhangjiakou, it administrates 9 towns and 9 townships, and as of 2010, has a population of 238,169. China National Highway 112 passes through the county just south of the county seat, Chicheng Town (赤城镇).

It was the setting of Zhang Yimou's 1999 film Not One Less.

== History ==
It was formerly in the far southeast of Chahar province.

== Administrative divisions ==
Chicheng County is divided into the following 18 divisions:

Towns:

- Chicheng (赤城镇)
- Tianjiayao (田家窑镇)
- Longguan (龙关镇)
- Diao'e (雕鹗镇)
- Dushikou (独石口镇)
- Baicao (白草镇)
- Longmensuo (龙门所镇)
- Houcheng (后城镇)
- Dongmao (东卯镇)

Townships:

- Paoliang Township (炮梁乡)
- Dahaituo Township (大海陀乡)
- Zhenningbu Township (镇宁堡乡)
- Maying Township (马营乡)
- Yunzhou Township (云州乡)
- Sandaochuan Township (三道川乡)
- Dongwankou Township (东万口乡)
- Ciyingzi Township (茨营子乡)
- Yangtian Township (样田乡)

== Climate ==
Climate data for Chicheng, elevation 868 m (2,848 ft), (1991–2020 normals, extremes 1981–present)
Month	Jan	Feb	Mar	Apr	May	Jun	Jul	Aug	Sep	Oct	Nov	Dec	Year
Record high °C (°F)	10.3 (50.5)	17.3 (63.1)	25.0 (77.0)	30.3 (86.5)	36.6 (97.9)	37.4 (99.3)	39.4 (102.9)	36.5 (97.7)	35.7 (96.3)	27.6 (81.7)	19.4 (66.9)	15.1 (59.2)	39.4 (102.9)
Mean daily maximum °C (°F)	−2.9 (26.8)	1.4 (34.5)	8.2 (46.8)	16.5 (61.7)	22.8 (73.0)	26.5 (79.7)	27.8 (82.0)	26.9 (80.4)	22.2 (72.0)	15.1 (59.2)	5.7 (42.3)	−1.6 (29.1)	14.0 (57.3)
Daily mean °C (°F)	−10.6 (12.9)	−6.8 (19.8)	0.2 (32.4)	8.5 (47.3)	15.3 (59.5)	19.5 (67.1)	21.7 (71.1)	20.2 (68.4)	14.6 (58.3)	7.1 (44.8)	−1.8 (28.8)	−8.9 (16.0)	6.6 (43.9)
Mean daily minimum °C (°F)	−16.4 (2.5)	−13.4 (7.9)	−7.0 (19.4)	0.7 (33.3)	7.3 (45.1)	12.9 (55.2)	16.4 (61.5)	14.6 (58.3)	8.1 (46.6)	0.6 (33.1)	−7.6 (18.3)	−14.4 (6.1)	0.2 (32.3)
Record low °C (°F)	−28.2 (−18.8)	−26.6 (−15.9)	−23.8 (−10.8)	−12.1 (10.2)	−3.3 (26.1)	3.3 (37.9)	7.6 (45.7)	0.4 (32.7)	−3.6 (25.5)	−12.6 (9.3)	−22.1 (−7.8)	−25.5 (−13.9)	−28.2 (−18.8)
Average precipitation mm (inches)	1.1 (0.04)	2.9 (0.11)	8.2 (0.32)	18.0 (0.71)	38.7 (1.52)	76.0 (2.99)	113.9 (4.48)	79.3 (3.12)	55.8 (2.20)	23.5 (0.93)	8.3 (0.33)	1.9 (0.07)	427.6 (16.82)
Average precipitation days (≥ 0.1 mm)	1.2	2.2	3.7	5.4	8.6	13.3	13.9	11.3	9.6	5.5	2.6	1.3	78.6
Average snowy days	3.0	4.1	4.4	2.2	0.2	0	0	0	0	0.9	3.3	2.7	20.8
Average relative humidity (%)	47	44	41	41	46	60	72	73	67	57	52	49	54
Mean monthly sunshine hours	207.7	202.4	238.9	248.5	268.1	237.2	227.5	235.0	224.5	225.5	195.3	196.9	2,707.5
Percentage possible sunshine	70	67	64	62	60	53	50	56	61	66	67	69	62
Source: China Meteorological Administrationall-time May high
