= Wang Chunchen =

Chinese art historian, curator, and critic

- 王春辰 (in Chinese)
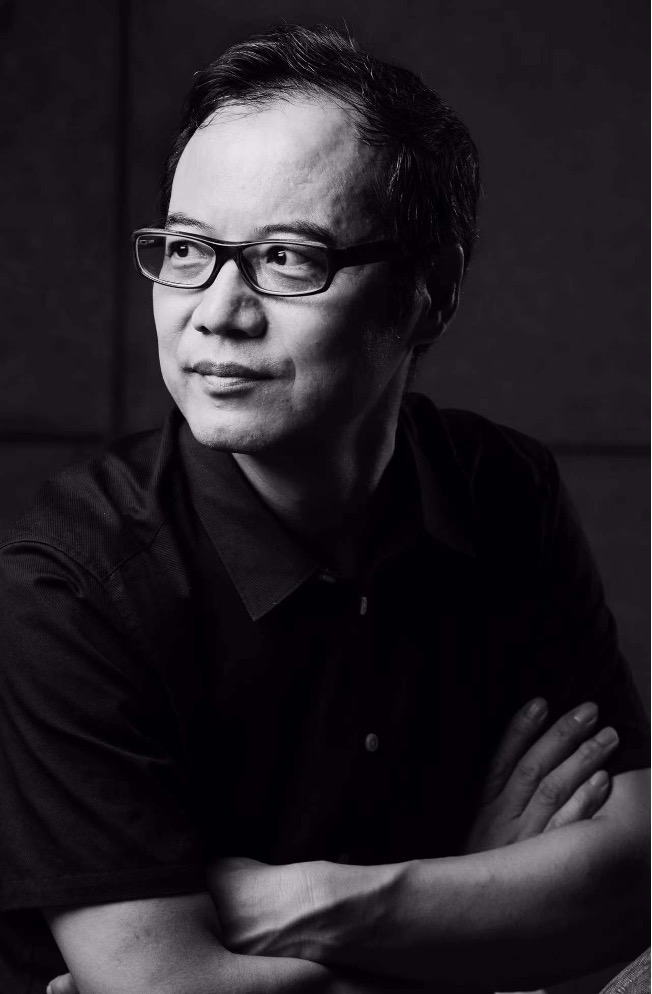
- Photographic portrait of Wang Chunchen
- Born: 1964 (age 61–62); Zhangjiakou, Hebei, China
- Education: Central Academy of Fine Arts
- Occupations: Art historian; author; critic; curator
- Employer: Central Academy of Fine Arts Art Museum
- Awards: China Contemporary Art Award (CCAA) Critics Award (2009)

Wang Chunchen (Chinese: 王春辰, born 1964 in Zhangjiakou, Hebei province) is a Chinese curator, critic, and art historian. He has been described as "one of China's most distinguished curators, art critics and historians".

== Education ==
Wang was educated at the Central Academy of Fine Arts in Beijing, China.

== Career ==
Dr Wang is employed by the Central Academy of Fine Arts Art Museum, formerly the CAFA Art Museum, where he is Head of the Department of Curatorial Research. He is engaged in modern art history and contemporary art theory and criticism.

In 2012, Wang was hired as a special adjunct curator to curate Chinese contemporary art exhibitions by the Eli and Edythe Broad Art Museum at Michigan State University in the United States, the first Chinese curator to be so employed at an America art museum. In 2013, he was appointed as curator of the Chinese pavilion at the 55th International Art Exhibition – la Biennale di Venezia and deputy principal editor of the Journal of Contemporary Chinese Art in the United Kingdom. He is also the editor-in-chief of the Chinese Contemporary Art Series, published by Springer.

== Books ==
Wang has written and translated the following books:

- Art Intervenes in Society (Timezone Publishing House, 2010)
- Artistic Democracy (China Youth Publishing House, 2013)
- The Politics of Images (China Youth Publishing House, 2013)
- Jizi and His Art in Contemporary China: Unification (with David Adam Brubaker, Springer, Chinese Contemporary Art Series, ISBN 978-3662449288, 2015)
- Future Returns: Contemporary Art from China (Art Media Resources, ISBN 978-1588861184, 2015)

Translations

- Art Since 1940 (Renmin University Press of China, 2006)
- Phenomena of Painting (Jiangsu Fine Arts Publishing House, 2006)
- New Thinking of Decoration (Jiangsu Fine Arts Publishing House, 2006)
- After the End of Art (Jiangsu People's Publishing House, 2007)
- The Abuse of Beauty (Jiangsu People's Publishing House, 2007)
- The Interpretation of Art (Hunan Fine Arts Publishing House, 2008)
- The Language of Art History (Jiangsu Fine Arts Publishing House, 2008)
- Cai Guoqiang: I Want to Believe (People's Publishing House, 2008)
- Contemporary Art Theory Since 1985 (Shanghai People's Fine Arts Publishing House, 2009)
- A Brief History of Art [Beauty] (Shanghai People's Fine Arts Publishing House, 2013)

== Awards ==
Wang received the 2009 China Contemporary Art Award (CCAA) Critics Award. In 2011, he was funded by the Overseas Training Project of Chinese Young Artist Theorists to investigate the development status of art museums in the United States. In 2012, he was selected to participate in the Art Management Project co-organized by the British Council for Cultural Exchange and the Chinese Ministry of Culture, visiting the Royal College of Art and the University of East Anglia in the United Kingdom.

== Selected curation ==
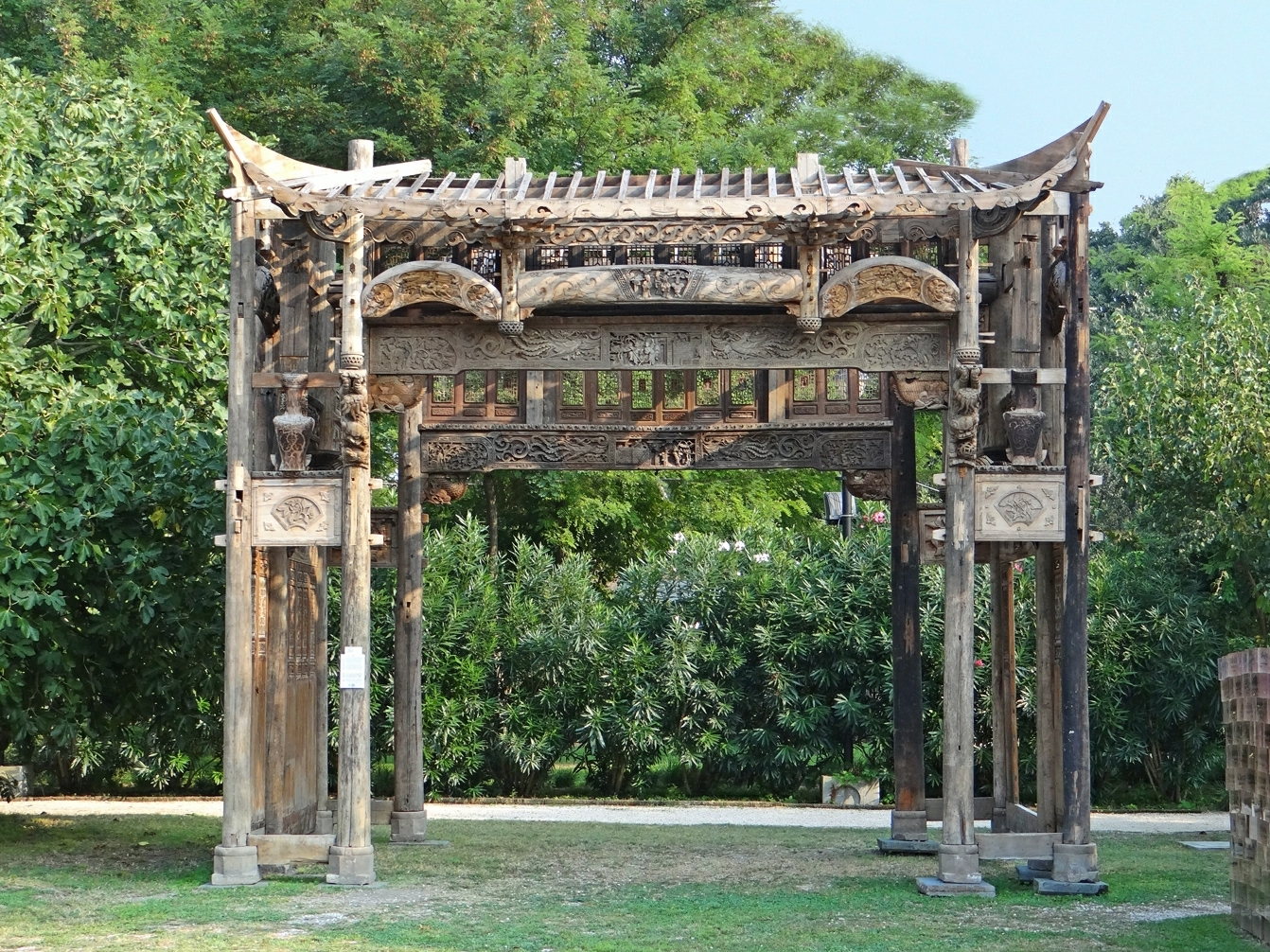
The Chinese pavilion at the 55th Venice Biennale (2013), curated by Wang Chunchen

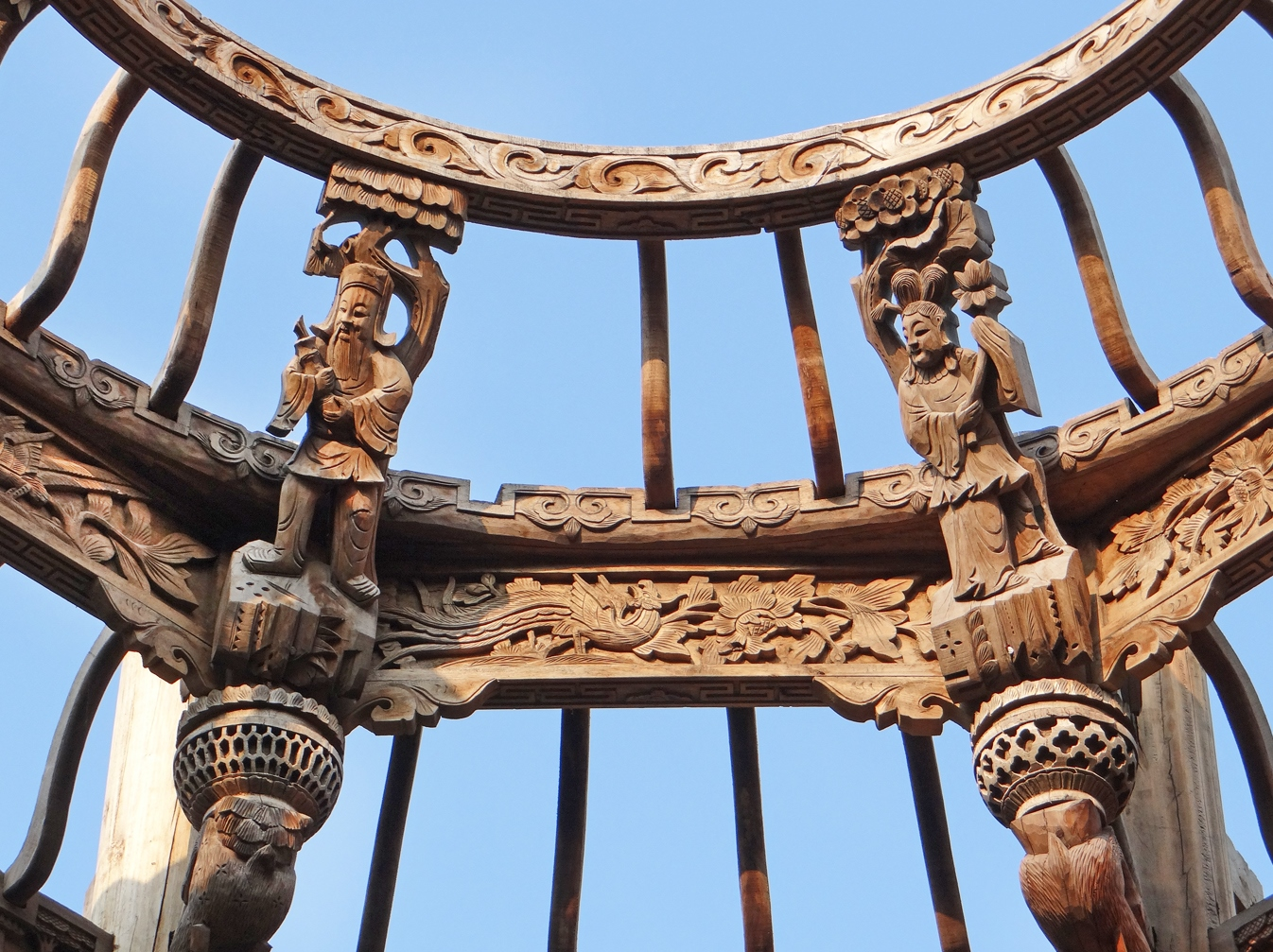
Detail of the Chinese pavilion at the 55th Venice Biennale

Wang has curated the following exhibitions in China and elsewhere:

2008

- Mixed Maze, London, United Kingdom
- Supernatural – China’s Photography in the New Century, New York, United States

2011

- CAFAM Biennale 2011: Super-Organism, CAFA Art Museum, Beijing, China

2012

- Conceptual Renewal: A Brief History of Chinese Contemporary Photography, Beijing, China

2013

- Transfiguration: The Presence of Chinese Artistic Methods, Venice Biennale, Venice, Italy

2014

- Future Returns: Contemporary Art from China, Broad Art Museum, Chicago, United States

2016

- Time Test-International Video Art Research Observation Exhibition, CAFA Art Museum, Beijing, China
- Internal Combustion – A New Generation of Female Artists in China, Central Academy of Fine Arts Art Museum, Beijing, China
- Coincidence of Time – Spanish Artist Naranjo's Printmaking Exhibition, Central Academy of Fine Arts Art Museum, Beijing, China

2017

- Dating: Youth Art Exhibition from China and France, CAFA Art Museum, Beijing, China
- Ink Attack – The First Wuhan Ink and Wash Biennale, Wuhan Art Museum, Wuhan, China

2018

- Harmony-Buddhism and Art Exhibition, Putian Art Museum, Putian, Fujian, China
- Jizi: Journey of the Spirit, WhiteBox, New York, United States

2019

- The Gaze of History: Revisiting Contemporary Chinese Art, Jupiter Museum of Art, Shenzhen, China
- Ink and Object: The Second Wuhan Ink and Wash Biennale, Wuhan Art Museum, Wuhan, China
- Anish Kapoor, first solo exhibition in China, Central Academy of Fine Arts Art Museum, Beijing, China
- Photography in China 180 Years, exhibition of contemporary photography, Yinchuan Museum of Contemporary Art, Yinchuan, China
- Jizi: Spiritual Journey, solo exhibition, Shijiazhuang Art Museum, Shijiazhuang
- Pop-up Biennale – Beijing Art District Studio History Document Exhibition, Nine Art District Art Museum, Beijing, China
- Huang Zhiyang: Hun Sheng Solo Exhibition, White Box Art Museum, Beijing, China
- The Passion of Color: The Art of Tang Chenghua, Tianjin Binhai Art Museum, Tianjin, China
- The Logical Line of Painting – Invitation Exhibition of the Generation and Significance of Contemporary Painting, Jinji Lake Art Museum, Suzhou, China
- Marc Quinn – Under the Skin, Central Academy of Fine Arts Art Museum, Beijing, China

2020

- In Thought – The History and Methodology of Chinese Contemporary Art, Guangdong Museum of Art, Guangzhou, China

2021

- Liao Bangming: Hardcore Tackling the Tough, Baiyu Art Space, Beijing, China
