= Puyi =

Emperor of China (1908–1912) and of Manchukuo (1934–1945)

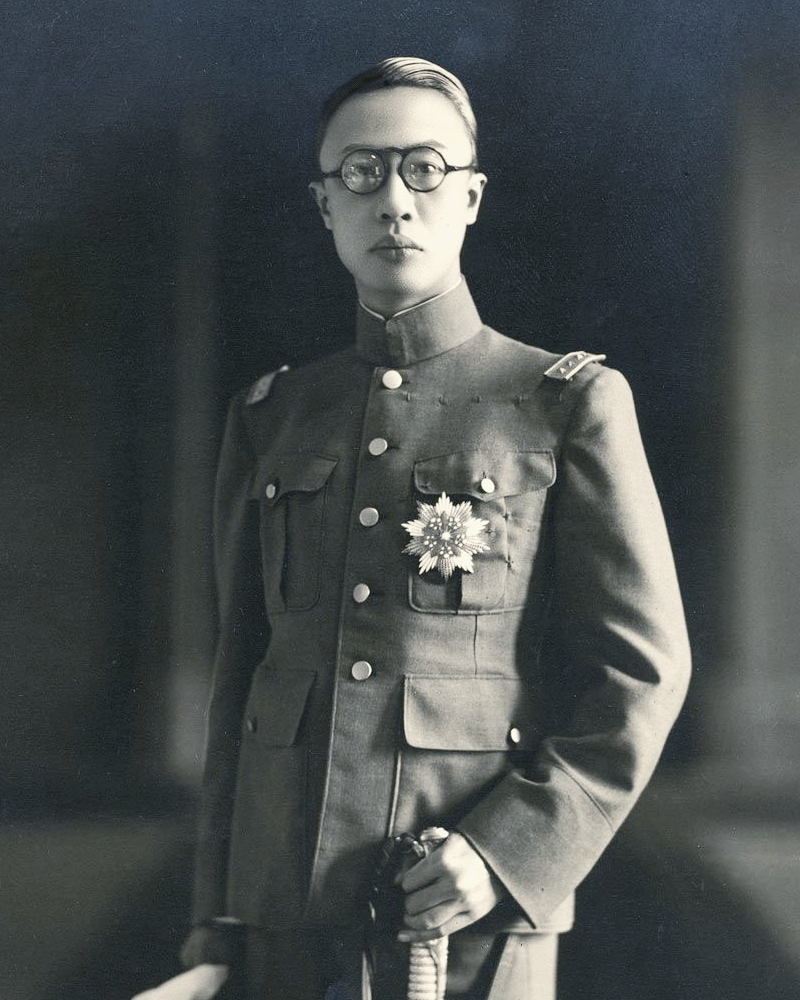
- Puyi during the Manchukuo period

Emperor of the Qing dynasty
- First reign: 2 December 1908 – 12 February 1912 (3 years, 72 days)
- Predecessor: Guangxu Emperor
- Successor: Monarchy abolished (Sun Yat-sen as President)
- Regents: Zaifeng, Prince Chun (1908–1911); Empress Dowager Longyu (1911–1912)
- Prime Ministers: Yikuang; Yuan Shikai
- Second reign: 1–12 July 1917 (Note: Between 1 July 1917 and 12 July 1917, during the Manchu Restoration, Puyi retook the throne and proclaimed himself the restored emperor of the Qing dynasty, supported by Zhang Xun, the self-proclaimed prime minister of the Imperial Cabinet. However, Puyi and Zhang Xun's proclamations in July 1917 were never recognised by the Republic of China (at the time, the sole legitimate government of China), the general populace or any foreign countries.) (11 days)
- Prime Minister: Zhang Xun

Emperor of Manchukuo
- Reign: 1 March 1934 – 17 August 1945 (11 years, 169 days)
- Predecessor: Himself (as Chief Executive)
- Successor: Position abolished
- Prime Ministers: Zheng Xiaoxu; Zhang Jinghui

Chief Executive of Manchukuo
- In office 18 February 1932 – 1 March 1934 (2 years, 11 days)
- Prime Minister: None; Zheng Xiaoxu
- Preceded by: Zhang Jinghui (as Chairman of the Northeast Supreme Administrative Council)
- Succeeded by: Himself (as Emperor)
- Born: 7 February 1906; Prince Chun's Mansion (in present-day Beijing)
- Died: 17 October 1967 (aged 61); Beijing, China
- Burial: Babaoshan Revolutionary Cemetery, later reburied in the Hualong Imperial Cemetery, Yi County, Hebei
- Consorts: Wanrong (m. 1922; died 1946) Wenxiu (m. 1922; div. 1931) Tan Yuling (m. 1937; died 1942) Li Yuqin (m. 1943; div. 1957) Li Shuxian (m. 1962)
Era dates
- Qing Xuantong (宣統; 1909–1912, 1917) Manchukuo Datong (大同; 1932–1934) Kangde (康德; 1934–1945)
- House: Aisin-Gioro
- Dynasty: Qing (1908–1912, 1917); Manchukuo (1932–1945)
- Father: Zaifeng, Prince Chun of the First Rank
- Mother: Youlan
- Religion: Buddhism
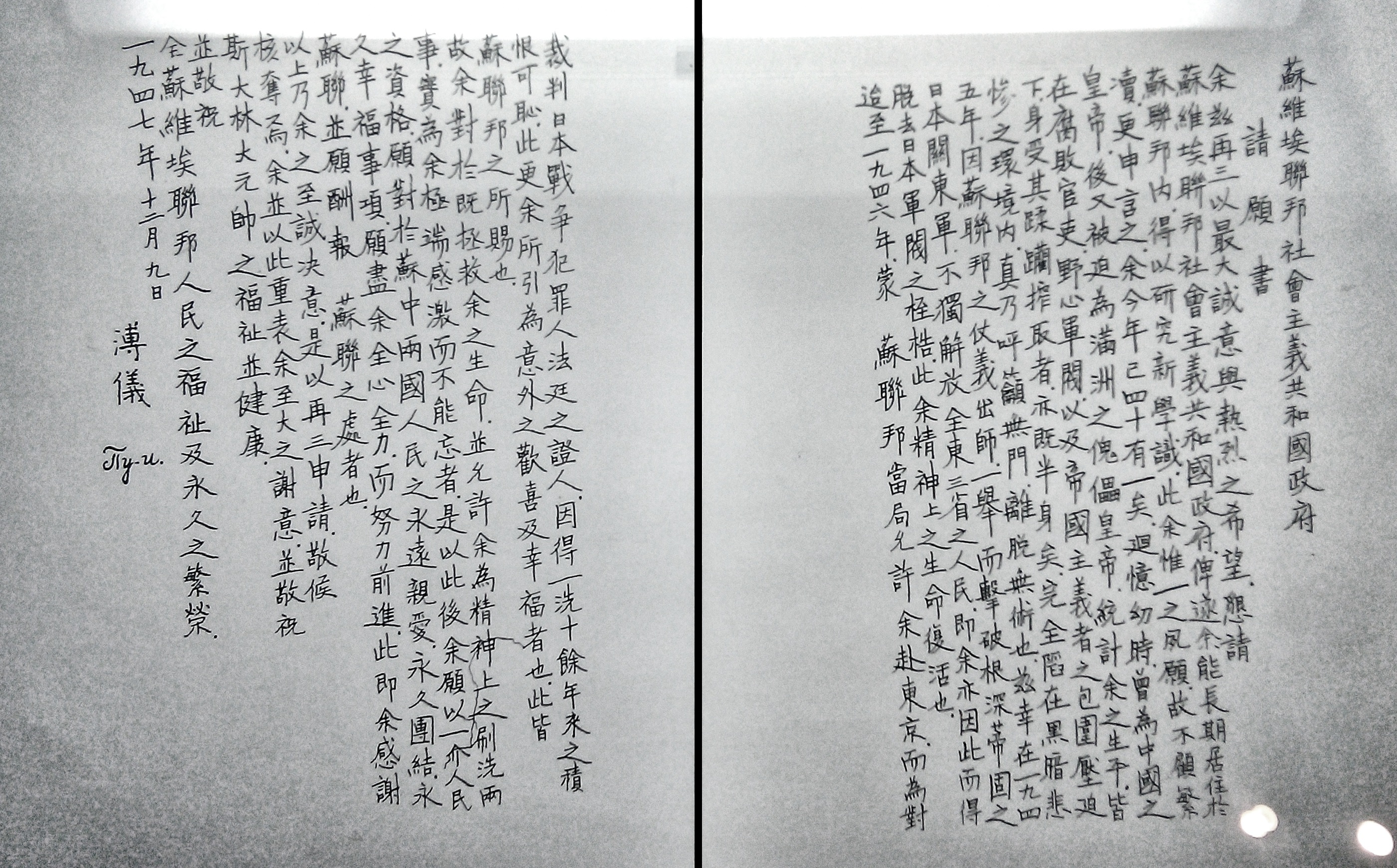
- Signature

Chinese name
- Traditional Chinese: 溥儀
- Simplified Chinese: 溥仪
Transcriptions
Standard Mandarin
- Hanyu Pinyin: Pǔyí
- Bopomofo: ㄆㄨˇ ㄧˊ
- Wade–Giles: Pʻu^{3}-i^{2}
- Tongyong Pinyin: Pǔ-yí
- IPA: [pʰù.ǐ]
Yue: Cantonese
- Jyutping: pou2 ji4

Xuantong Emperor
- Traditional Chinese: 宣統帝
- Simplified Chinese: 宣统帝
Transcriptions
Standard Mandarin
- Hanyu Pinyin: Xuāntǒng Dì
- Bopomofo: ㄒㄩㄢ ㄊㄨㄥˇ ㄉㄧˋ
- Wade–Giles: Hsüan^{1}-tʻung^{3} Ti^{4}
- Tongyong Pinyin: Syuan-tǒng Dì
- IPA: [ɕɥɛ́n.tʰʊ̀ŋ tî]
Yue: Cantonese
- Jyutping: syun1 tung2 dai3
- IPA: [syn˥ tʰʊŋ˧˥ tɐj˧]

Puyi (Note: Courtesy name: Yaozhi (曜之)) (Chinese: 溥儀; pinyin: Pǔ Yí; Wade–Giles: P'u-i; 7 February 1906 – 17 October 1967) was the last emperor of China, having reigned as the Xuantong Emperor of the Qing dynasty (1908–1912, with a brief restoration in 1917) and later as the Kangde Emperor of Manchukuo, a Japanese puppet state during World War II. After the war, he was held as a war criminal in the Soviet Union and China until 1959, when the Chinese Communist Party granted him amnesty and presented him as a model of successful reeducation.

In 1908, chosen by Empress Dowager Cixi to succeed the childless Guangxu Emperor, Puyi ascended the throne at age two with his father Prince Chun as regent. Following the Xinhai Revolution, Empress Dowager Longyu signed the abdication edict on Puyi's behalf; in return, the Articles of Favorable Treatment allowed him to retain his imperial title and remain in the Forbidden City. From 1 to 12 July 1917, the loyalist general Zhang Xun restored him to the throne. In 1924, warlord Feng Yuxiang expelled him from the palace, and Puyi took refuge in Tianjin.

Following the Japanese invasion of Manchuria, Puyi was installed as chief executive of Manchukuo in 1932 and he was crowned emperor of Manchukuo in 1934. At the end of the Second Sino-Japanese War in 1945, he was captured by the Soviet Red Army, testified at the Tokyo War Crimes Tribunal in 1946, and he was repatriated to the People's Republic of China in 1950. After his release in 1959, Puyi published an autobiography (ghostwritten by Li Wenda) and he worked as a gardener before he became a researcher at the Central Research Institute of Culture and History. In 1964, he was selected as a member of 4th Chinese People's Political Consultative Conference. After the Cultural Revolution broke out in 1966, he was protected by Zhou Enlai, and he died without issue in 1967.

== Childhood and reign (1908–1912) ==
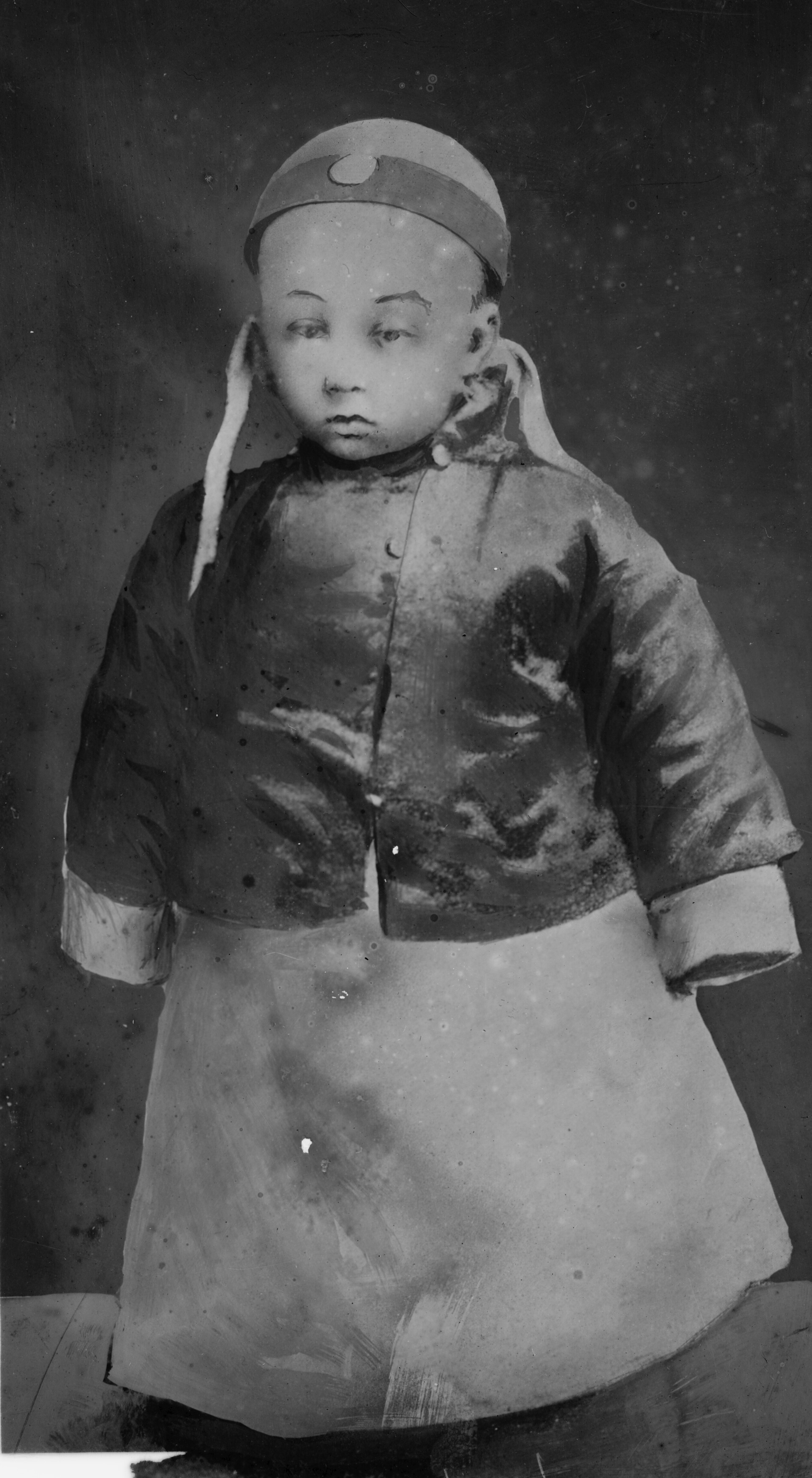
Puyi in 1908

Puyi was born on 7 February 1906 in Beijing. His father was Zaifeng, the Prince Chun. Zaifeng was a Manchu prince. His great-grandfather was the Daoguang Emperor, his great-uncle was the Xianfeng Emperor, and his grandfather was Yixuan, the first person to hold the title of Prince Chun. Puyi's uncle, the Guangxu Emperor, was Puyi's immediate predecessor.

Puyi's mother was Youlan, of the Manchu Plain White Banner Gūwalgiya clan. Her father was Ronglu, who held the minor rank of Qiduyu in the nobility, and who was a close ally of Empress Dowager Cixi. He held a number of important positions in the government, including Minister of War and Chief Grand Councillor (1895–1898). He was also commandant of the Peking Field Force (1870–1879) and Beiping Police (1877–1879), a lieutenant-general of the Plain White Banner (1887), and chamberlain of the Imperial Bodyguard (1888). In 1895, he founded the Army of North China, the dominant military force in China until 1927. Zaifeng married Youlan in 1902.

Chosen by Empress Dowager Cixi, Puyi became emperor at the age of 2 years 10 months and 25 days in December 1908 after the Guangxu Emperor, Puyi's half-uncle, died childless on 14 November. Titled the Xuantong Emperor, Puyi's introduction to the life of an emperor began when palace officials arrived at his family residence to take him. On the evening of 13 November, without any advance notice, a procession of eunuchs and guardsmen led by the palace chamberlain left the Forbidden City for the Northern Mansion to inform Prince Chun that they were taking away his two-year-old son Puyi to be the new emperor. The toddler Puyi screamed and resisted as the officials ordered the eunuch attendants to pick him up. Puyi's parents said nothing when they learned that they were losing their son. As Puyi wept, screaming that he did not want to leave his parents, he was forced into a palanquin that took him to the Forbidden City. Wang Lianshou, Puyi's wet nurse, was the only person from the Northern Mansion allowed to go with him. Upon arriving at the Forbidden City, Puyi was taken to see Cixi. Puyi later wrote:

I still have a dim recollection of this meeting, the shock of which left a deep impression on my memory. I remember suddenly finding myself surrounded by strangers, while before me was hung a drab curtain through which I could see an emaciated and terrifying, hideous face. This was Cixi. It is said that I burst out into loud howls at the sight and started to tremble uncontrollably. Cixi told someone to give me some sweets, but I threw them on the floor and yelled, "I want nanny, I want nanny", to her great displeasure. "What a naughty child," she said. "Take him away to play."

Cixi died on 15 November, less than two days after the meeting. Puyi's father, Prince Chun, became Prince Regent. During Puyi's coronation in the Hall of Supreme Harmony on 2 December 1908, the young emperor was carried onto the Dragon Throne by his father. Puyi was frightened by the scene before him and the deafening sounds of ceremonial drums and music, and started crying. His father could do nothing except quietly comfort him: "Don't cry, it'll be over soon." Puyi wrote in his autobiography:

Two days after I entered the palace [Cixi] died, and on December 2, the "Great Ceremony of Enthronement" took place, a ceremony that I ruined with my crying.

Puyi did not see his biological mother, Princess Consort Chun, for the next seven years. He developed a special bond with Wang and credited her as the only person who could control him. She was sent away when he was eight years old. After Puyi married, he would occasionally bring her to the Forbidden City, and later Manchukuo, to visit him.

Growing up with scarcely any memory of a time when he was not indulged and revered, Puyi quickly became spoiled. The adults in his life, except for Wang, were all strangers, remote, distant, and unable to discipline him. Wherever he went, grown men would kneel down in a ritual kowtow, averting their eyes until he passed. Soon he discovered the absolute power he wielded over the eunuchs, and he frequently had them beaten for small transgressions. As an emperor, Puyi's every whim was catered to while no one ever said no to him, making him into a sadistic boy who loved to have his eunuchs flogged or forced to eat dirt. Puyi later said, "Flogging eunuchs was part of my daily routine. My cruelty and love of wielding power were already too firmly set for persuasion to have any effect on me."

Every day, Puyi had to visit five former imperial concubines, called his "mothers", to report on his progress. He hated his "mothers", not least because they prevented him from seeing his real mother until he was 13. Their leader was the autocratic Empress Dowager Longyu, who successfully conspired to have Puyi's beloved wet nurse Wang expelled from the Forbidden City when he was 8 on the grounds that Puyi was too old to be breast-fed. Puyi especially hated Longyu for that. Puyi later wrote, "Although I had many mothers, I never knew any motherly love." Empress dowager Longyu ruled with paramount authority over the Qing imperial court, and though she was not the de jure "regent", she was the de facto ruler of the Qing empire.

Puyi had a standard Confucian education, being taught the various Chinese classics and nothing else. He later wrote: "I learnt nothing of mathematics, let alone science, and for a long time I had no idea where Peking was situated". When Puyi was 13, he met his parents and siblings, all of whom had to kowtow before him as he sat upon the Dragon Throne. By this time, he had forgotten what his mother looked like. Such was the awe in which the emperor was held that his younger brother Pujie never heard his parents refer to Puyi as "your elder brother" but only as "The Emperor". Pujie told the journalist Edward Behr his image of Puyi prior to meeting him was that of "a venerable old man with a beard. I couldn't believe it when I saw this boy in yellow robes sitting solemnly on the throne". Although Puyi could now see his family again, this happened rarely, and always under the stifling rules of imperial etiquette. The consequence was that the relationship of the emperor with his parents was distant. Later, Puyi began to receive visits from his brothers and cousins, who provided a certain air of normality to his unique childhood.

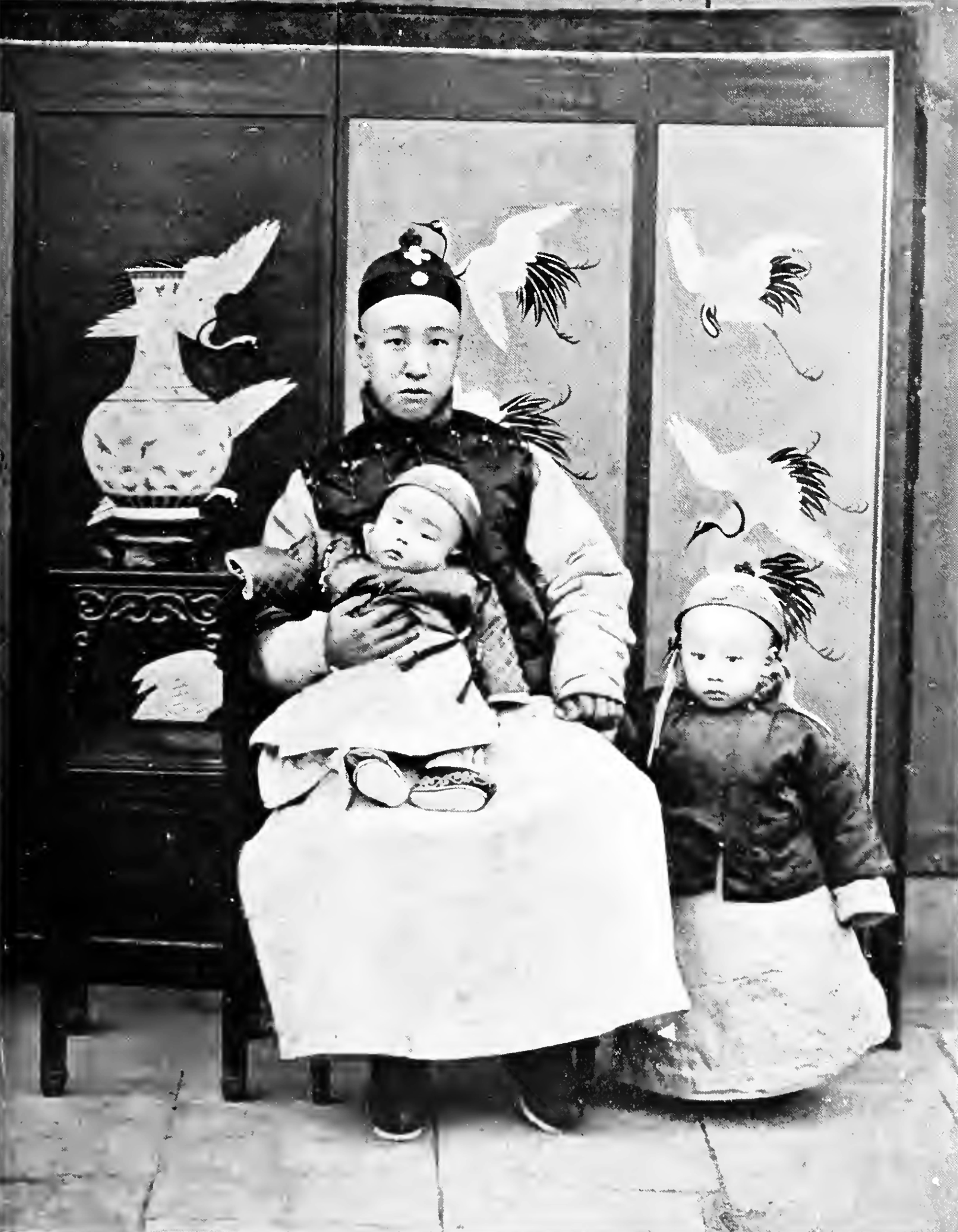
Prince Chun with his two sons, Puyi (standing) and Pujie

=== Abdication ===
On 10 October 1911, the army garrison in Wuhan mutinied, sparking a widespread revolt in the Yangtze river valley and beyond, demanding the overthrow of the Qing dynasty, which had ruled China since 1644. The strongman general Yuan Shikai was dispatched by the court to crush the revolution, but was unable to, as by 1911 public opinion had turned decisively against the Qing, and many Chinese had no wish to fight for a dynasty that was seen as having lost the mandate of heaven. Puyi's father, Prince Chun, resigned as regent on 6 December, when Empress Dowager Longyu took over with Yuan Shikai as Prime Minister.

Empress Dowager Longyu endorsed the "Imperial Edict of the Abdication of the Qing Emperor" on 12 February 1912, under a deal brokered by Yuan with the imperial court in Beijing and the Republicans in southern China. Puyi recalled in his autobiography the meeting between Longyu and Yuan:

The Dowager Empress was sitting on a kang [platform] in a side room of the Mind Nature Palace, wiping her eyes with a handkerchief as a fat old man [Yuan] knelt before her on a red cushion, tears streaming down his face. I was sitting to the right of the widow and wondering why both adults were crying. There was no one in the room other than the three of us and everything was very quiet; the fat man snorted as he spoke and I couldn't understand what he was saying... This was the time when Yuan directly raised the question of abdication.

== Life in the Forbidden City (1912–1924) ==
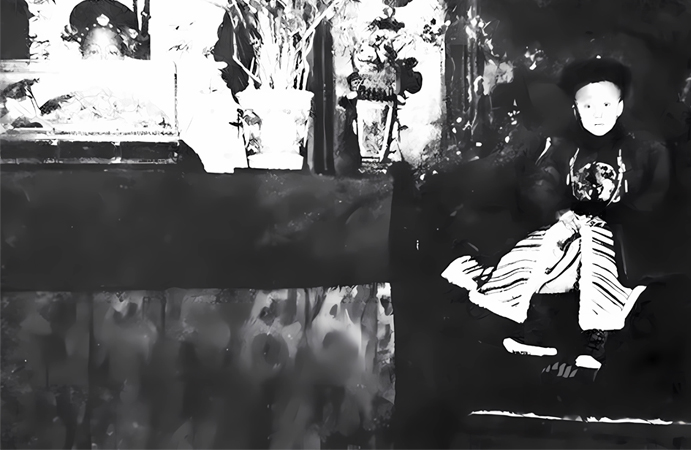
Young Puyi, the Xuantong Emperor (seated right) and his regent, the Empress Dowager Longyu.

Under the "Articles of Favourable Treatment of the Great Qing Emperor after His Abdication", signed with the new Republic of China, Puyi was to retain his imperial title and be treated by the government of the Republic with the protocol attached to a foreign monarch. Puyi and the imperial court were allowed to remain in the northern half of the Forbidden City (the Private Apartments) as well as in the Summer Palace. An annual subsidy of four million silver taels was granted by the Republic to the imperial household, although it was never fully paid and was abolished after just a few years. Puyi was not informed in February 1912 that his reign had ended and China was now a republic, and continued to believe that he was still emperor for some time. In 1913, when Empress Dowager Longyu died, President Yuan arrived at the Forbidden City to pay his respects, which Puyi's tutors told him meant that major changes were afoot.

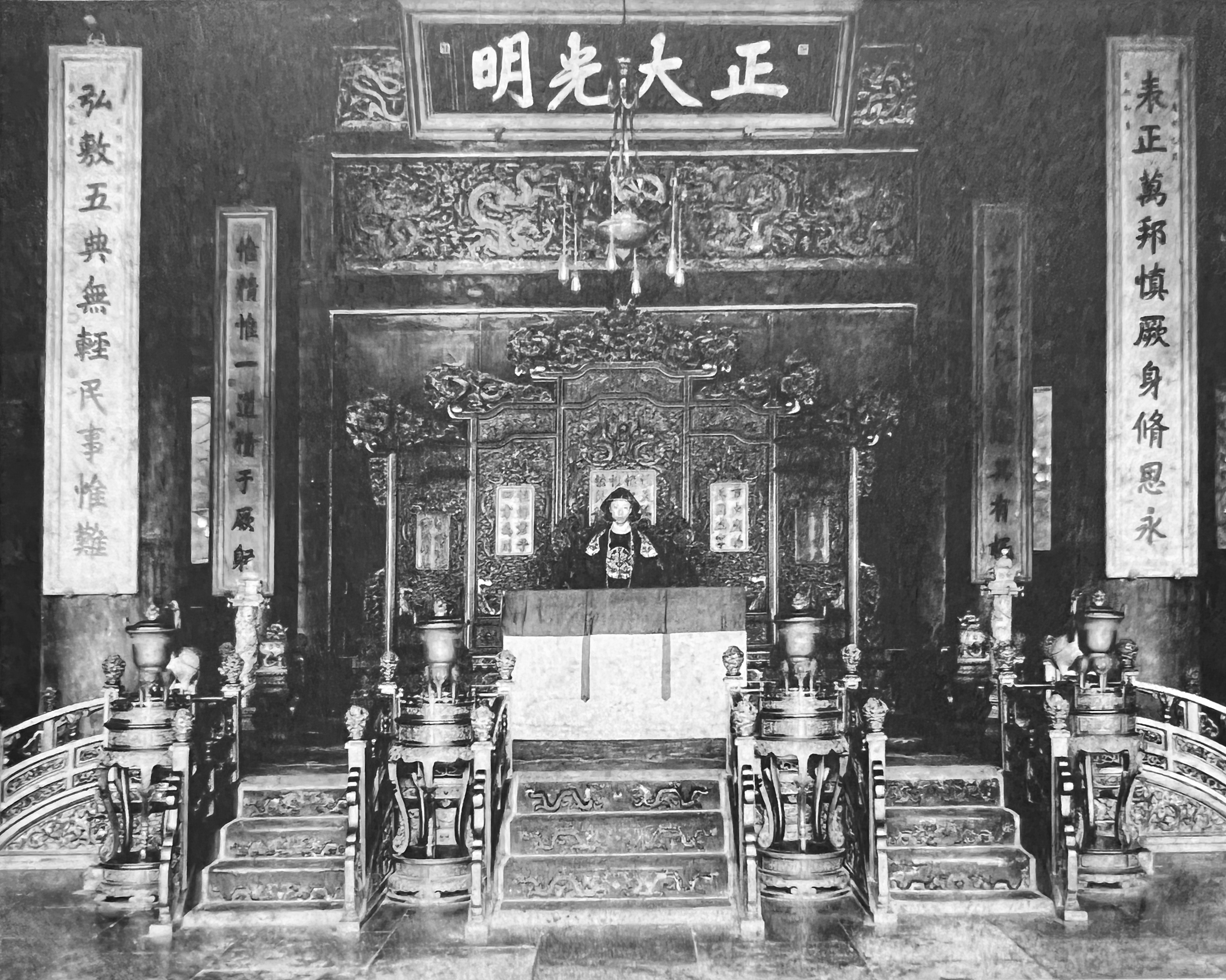
Titular emperor Puyi in the Forbidden City.

Puyi soon learned that the real reasons for the Articles of Favourable Settlement was that President Yuan was planning on restoring the monarchy with himself as the emperor of a new dynasty, and wanted to have Puyi as a sort of custodian of the Forbidden City until he could move in. Puyi first learned of Yuan's plans to become emperor when he brought in army bands to serenade him whenever he had a meal, and he started on a decidedly imperial take on the presidency. Puyi loathed Yuan as a "traitor" and decided to sabotage his plans to become emperor by hiding the Imperial Seals, only to be told by his tutors that he would just make new ones. In 1915, Yuan proclaimed himself as emperor, and he was planning to marry his daughter to Puyi, but had to abdicate in the face of popular opposition.

=== Brief restoration (1917) ===
In 1917, the warlord Zhang Xun restored Puyi to the throne from 1 to 12 July. Zhang Xun ordered his army to keep their queues to display loyalty to the emperor. However, the then-Premier of the Republic of China, Duan Qirui, ordered a Caudron Type D plane, piloted by Pan Shizhong (潘世忠) with bombardier Du Yuyuan (杜裕源) from Nanyuan airfield, to drop three bombs over the Forbidden City as a show of force against Zhang Xun, causing the death of a eunuch, but otherwise inflicting minor damage. This is the first aerial bombardment recorded by a Chinese Air Force, and the restoration failed due to extensive opposition across China.

=== Relationship with Reginald Johnston ===
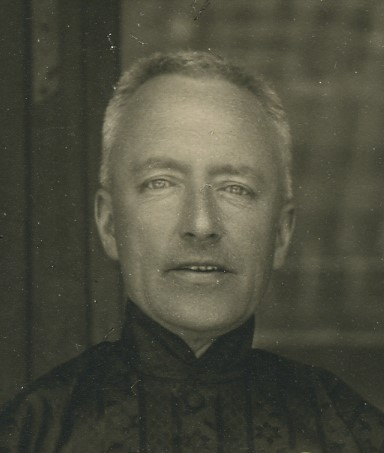
Reginald Johnston, who became Puyi's tutor in 1919.

On 3 March 1919, the Scottish scholar and diplomat Reginald Johnston arrived in the Forbidden City to serve as Puyi's tutor. President Xu Shichang believed the monarchy would eventually be restored, and to prepare Puyi for the challenges of the modern world had hired Johnston to teach Puyi "subjects such as political science, constitutional history and English". Johnston was allowed only five texts in English to give Puyi to read: Alice in Wonderland and translations into English of the "Four Great Books" of Confucianism; the Analects, the Mencius, the Great Learning and the Doctrine of the Mean. But he disregarded the rules, and taught Puyi about world history with a special focus on British history. Besides history, Johnston taught Puyi philosophy and about what he saw as the superiority of monarchies to republics. Puyi remembered that his tutor's piercing blue eyes "made me feel uneasy ... I found him very intimidating and studied English with him like a good boy, not daring to talk about other things when I got bored ... as I did with my other Chinese tutors".

As the only person capable of controlling Puyi, Johnston had much more influence than his title of English tutor would suggest, as the eunuchs began to rely on him to steer Puyi away from his more capricious moods. Under the Scotsman's influence, Puyi started to insist that his eunuchs address him as "Henry" and later his wife Wanrong as "Elizabeth" as Puyi began to speak "Chinglish", a mixture of Mandarin and English that became his preferred mode of speech. Puyi recalled of Johnston: "I thought everything about him was first-rate. He made me feel that Westerners were the most intelligent and civilised people in the world and that he was the most learned of Westerners" and that "Johnston had become the major part of my soul". In May 1919, Puyi noticed the protests in Beijing generated by the May Fourth Movement as thousands of Chinese university students protested against the decision by the great powers at the Paris peace conference to award the former German concessions in Shandong together with the former German colony of Qingdao to Japan. For Puyi, the May Fourth Movement, which he asked Johnston about, was a revelation as it marked the first time in his life that he noticed that people outside the Forbidden City had concerns that were not about him. After his first interview with the emperor, the British academic recorded his impressions in a report addressed to the British authorities; in this document Johnston mentions:

He appears to be physically robust and well developed for his age. He is a very "human" boy, with liveliness, intelligence and an enthusiastic sense of humour. Furthermore, he has excellent manners and is totally free from arrogance ... Although the emperor does not seem to have been spoiled yet, from the nonsense and futility that surrounds him, I am afraid there is no hope that he will emerge unscathed from the moral dangers through the next few years of his life (very critical years necessarily for a boy in his early adolescence), unless he can be removed from the influence of the hordes of eunuchs and other useless officials who are now almost his only companions. I am inclined to think that the best course of action to take in the interest of the boy himself would be to remove him from the harmful atmosphere of the "Forbidden City" and send him to the Summer Palace. There it would be possible for him to live a much less artificial and happier life than he can under the present conditions...

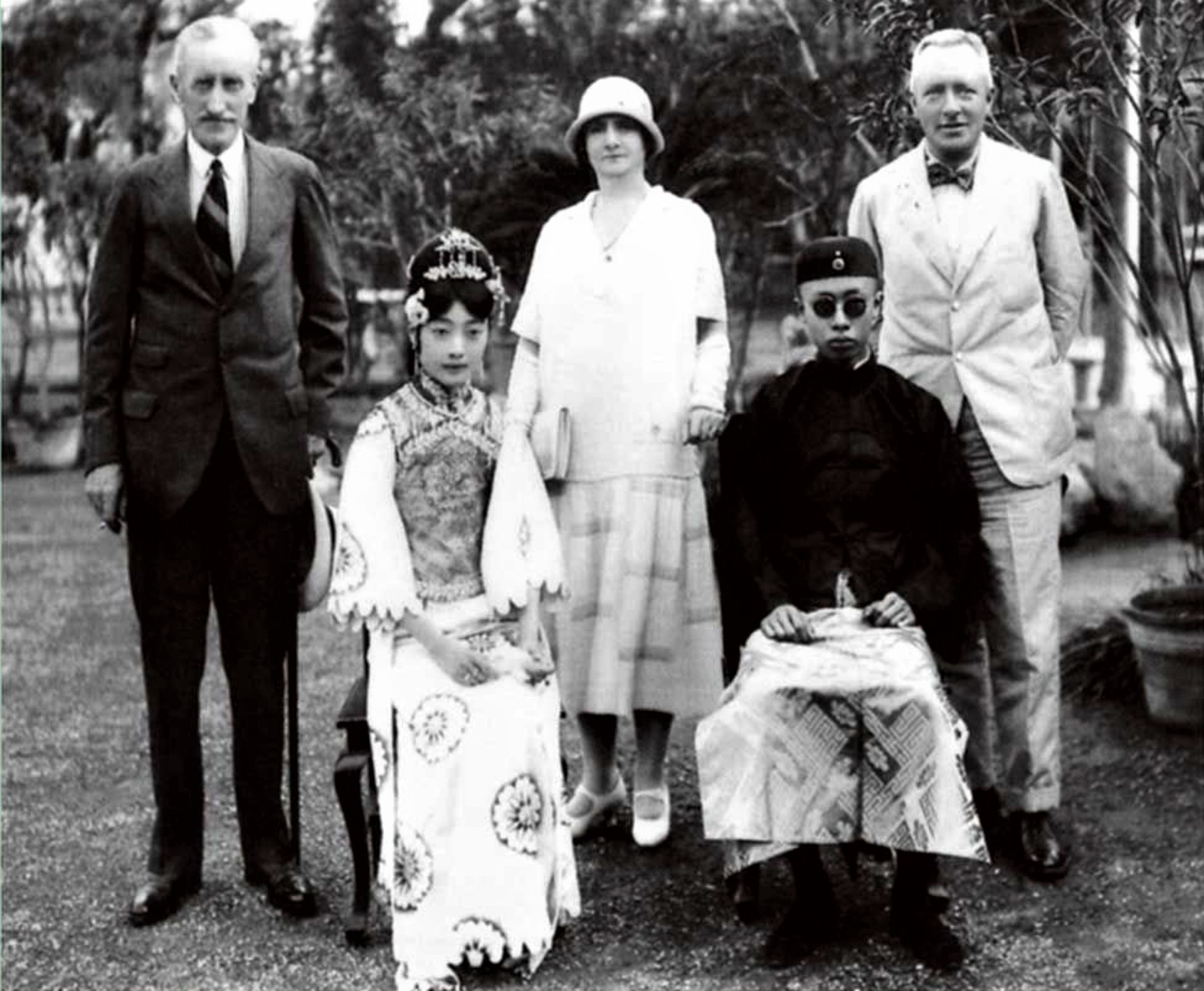
Puyi in the Zhang Garden with Wanrong and Johnston

Puyi could not speak Manchu; he only knew a single word in the language, yili ('arise'). Despite studying Manchu for years, he admitted that it was his "worst" subject among everything he studied. According to the journalist Syed Mohammad Ali, Puyi spoke Mandarin when interviewed, but Ali believed he could understand English. Johnston also introduced Puyi to the new technology of cinema, and Puyi was so delighted with the movies, especially Harold Lloyd films, that he had a film projector installed in the Forbidden City despite the opposition of the eunuchs. Johnston was also the first to argue that Puyi needed glasses since he had developed myopia, as he was extremely near-sighted, and after much argument with Prince Chun, who thought it was undignified for an emperor, finally prevailed. Johnston, who spoke fluent Mandarin, closely followed the intellectual scene in China, and introduced Puyi to the "new-style" Chinese books and magazines, which inspired Puyi so much that he wrote several poems that were published anonymously in "New China" publications. In 1922, Johnston had his friend, the writer Hu Shih, visit the Forbidden City to teach Puyi about recent developments in Chinese literature. Under Johnston's influence, Puyi embraced the bicycle as a way to exercise, cut his queue and grew a full head of hair, and wanted to study at the University of Oxford, Johnston's alma mater. Johnston also introduced Puyi to the telephone, which Puyi soon became addicted to, phoning people in Beijing at random just to hear their voices on the other end. Johnston also pressured Puyi to cut down on the waste and extravagance in the Forbidden City and encouraged him to be more self-sufficient.

=== Marriage and sexuality ===
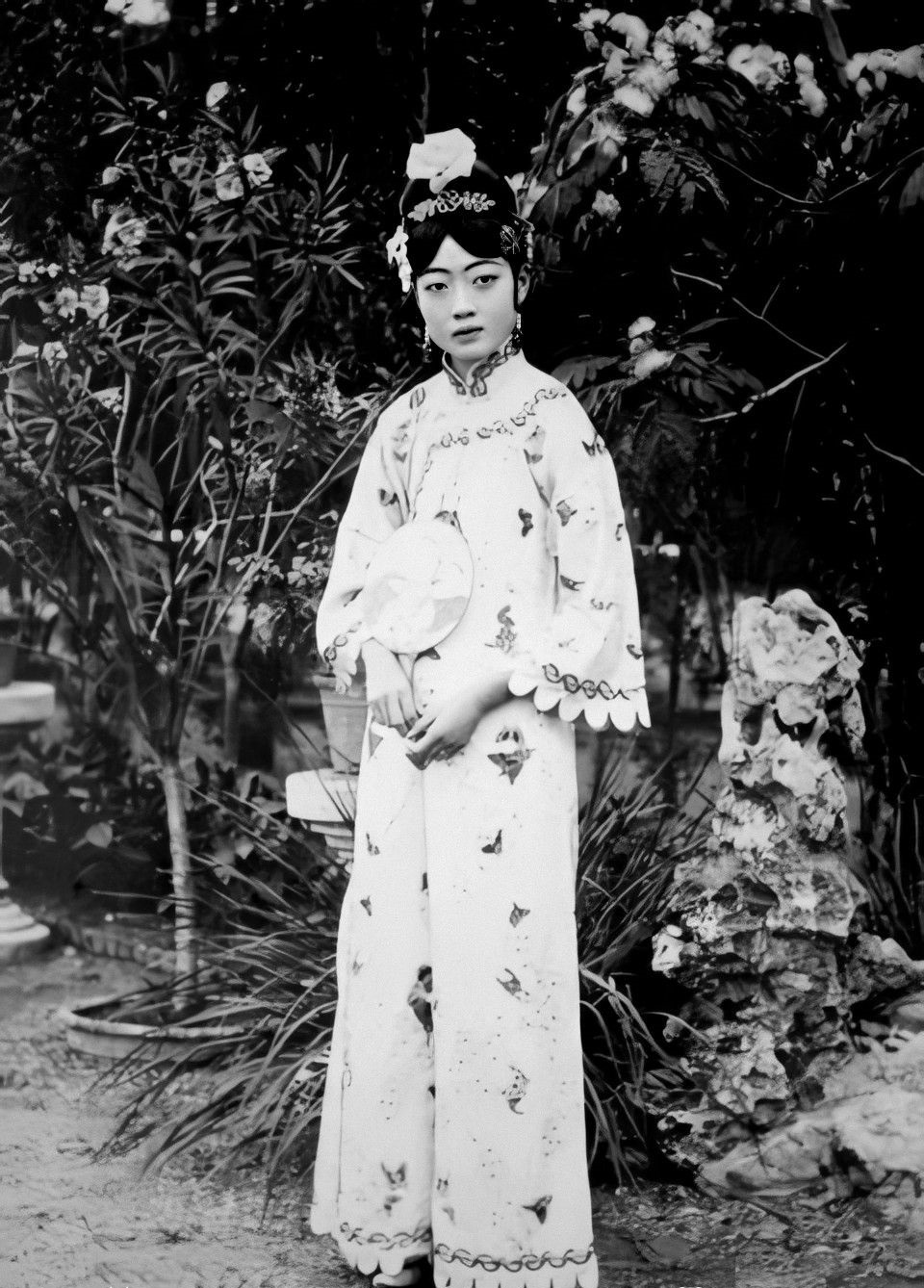
Wanrong, Puyi's wife and Empress of China

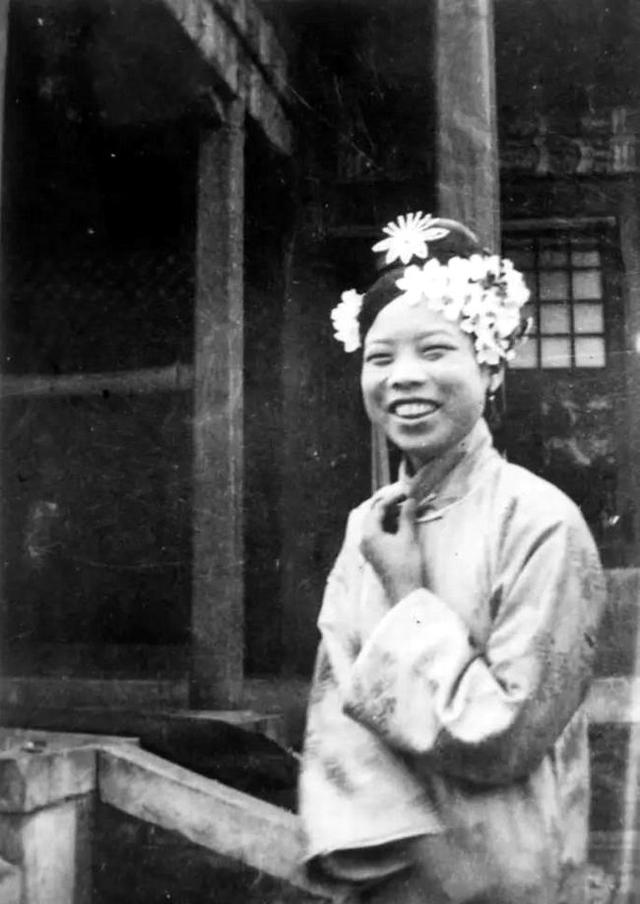
Secondary consort Wenxiu

In March 1922, the Dowager Consorts decided that Puyi should be married, and gave him a selection of photographs of aristocratic teenage girls to choose from. Puyi first chose Wenxiu as his wife, but was told that she was acceptable only as a concubine, so he would have to choose again. Puyi later claimed that the faces were too small to distinguish between. Puyi then chose Wanrong, the daughter of one of Manchuria's richest aristocrats, who had been educated in English by American missionaries in Tianjin, who was considered to be an acceptable empress by the Dowager Consorts. On 15 March 1922, the betrothal of Puyi and Wanrong was announced in the newspapers. On 17 March, Wanrong took the train to Beijing, and on 6 April, Puyi went to the Qing family shrine to inform his ancestors that he would be married to her later that year. Puyi did not meet Wanrong until their wedding.

In an interview in 1986, Prince Pujie told Behr: "Puyi constantly talked about going to England and becoming an Oxford student, like Johnston." On 4 June 1922, Puyi attempted to escape from the Forbidden City and planned to issue an open letter to "the people of China" renouncing the title of Emperor before leaving for Oxford. The escape attempt failed when Johnston vetoed it and refused to call a taxi, and Puyi was too frightened to live on the streets of Beijing on his own. Pujie said of Puyi's escape attempt: "Puyi's decision had nothing to do with the impending marriage. He felt cooped up, and wanted out." Johnston later recounted his time as Puyi's tutor between 1919 and 1924 in his 1934 book Twilight in the Forbidden City, one of the main sources of information about Puyi's life in this period, though Behr cautioned that Johnston painted an idealised picture of Puyi, avoiding all mention of Puyi's sexuality, merely average academic ability, erratic mood swings, and eunuch-flogging. Pujie told Behr of Puyi's moods: "When he was in a good mood, everything was fine, and he was a charming companion. If something upset him, his dark side would emerge." On 21 October 1922, Puyi's wedding to Princess Wanrong began with the "betrothal presents" of 18 sheep, 2 horses, 40 pieces of satin, and 80 rolls of cloth, marched from the Forbidden City to Wanrong's house, accompanied by court musicians and cavalry. Following Manchu traditions where weddings were conducted under moonlight for good luck, an enormous procession of palace guardsmen, eunuchs, and musicians carried the Princess Wanrong in a red sedan chair called the Phoenix Chair within the Forbidden City, where Puyi sat upon the Dragon Throne. Later Wanrong kowtowed to him six times in her living quarters to symbolise her submission to her husband as the decree of their marriage was read out.

Wanrong wore a mask in accordance with Chinese tradition and Puyi, who knew nothing of women, remembered: "I hardly thought about marriage and family. It was only when the Empress came into my field of vision with a crimson satin cloth embroidered with a dragon and a phoenix over her head that I felt at all curious about what she looked like." After the wedding was complete, Puyi, Wanrong, and his secondary consort Wenxiu (whom he married the same night) went to the Palace of Earthly Tranquility, where everything was red – the colour of love and sex in China – and where emperors had traditionally consummated their marriages. Puyi, who was sexually inexperienced and timid, fled from the bridal chamber, leaving his wives to sleep in the Dragon Bed by themselves.

Wanrong's younger brother Runqi recalled how Puyi and Wanrong loved to race their bicycles through the Forbidden City and told Behr in an interview: "There was a lot of laughter, she and Puyi seemed to get on well, they were like kids together." In 1986, Behr interviewed one of Puyi's two surviving eunuchs, an 85-year-old who was reluctant to answer the questions asked of him, but finally said of Puyi's relationship with Wanrong: "The Emperor would come over to the nuptial apartments once every three months and spend the night there ... He left early in the morning on the following day and for the rest of that day he would invariably be in a very filthy temper indeed." A eunuch who served in the Forbidden City as Wanrong's personal servant later wrote in his memoir that there was a rumour among the eunuchs that Puyi was gay, noting a strange situation where he was asked by Puyi to stand inside Wanrong's room while Puyi groped her. Another eunuch claimed that Puyi preferred the "land-way" of the eunuchs to the "water-way" of the Empress, implying he was gay.

Puyi rarely left the Forbidden City, knew nothing of the lives of ordinary Chinese people, and was somewhat misled by Johnston, who told him that the vast majority of the Chinese wanted a Qing restoration. Johnston, a Sinophile scholar and a romantic conservative with an instinctive preference for monarchies, believed that China needed a benevolent autocrat to guide the country forward. He was enough of a traditionalist to respect that all major events in the Forbidden City were determined by the court astrologers. Johnston disparaged the superficially Westernised Chinese republican elite who dressed in top hats, frock coats, and business suits as not authentically Chinese, and praised to Puyi the Confucian scholars with their traditional robes as the ones who were authentically Chinese.

=== Imperial Household reforms ===
The Forbidden City had long suffered from corruption and theft by the eunuchs. According to Puyi, by the end of his wedding ceremony, the pearls and jade in the empress's crown had been stolen. After his wedding, Puyi began to take control of the palace and reform the household. Inspired by Johnston, Puyi ordered an inventory of the Forbidden City's treasures, but on 27 June 1923, a fire destroyed the area around the Palace of Established Happiness. Puyi suspected it was arson to cover theft. In response, a month after the fire, he evicted almost all the eunuchs from the palace with the support of the Beiyang Army. Runqi recalled: "But after the eunuchs went, many of the palaces inside the Forbidden City were closed down, and the place took on a desolate, abandoned air."

After the Great Kantō earthquake on 1 September 1923 destroyed the cities of Tokyo and Yokohama, Puyi donated jade antiques worth some £33,000 to pay for disaster relief, which led a delegation of Japanese diplomats to visit the Forbidden City to express their thanks. To continue reform efforts, Puyi appointed Zheng Xiaoxu as minister of Household Department, and Zheng hired Tong Jixu, a former Beiyang Army officer, as chief of operations. These efforts did not last long before Puyi was forced out of the Forbidden City by Feng Yuxiang.

== Expulsion from the Forbidden City (1924) ==
Wanrong and Puyi after their expulsion, 30 November 1924

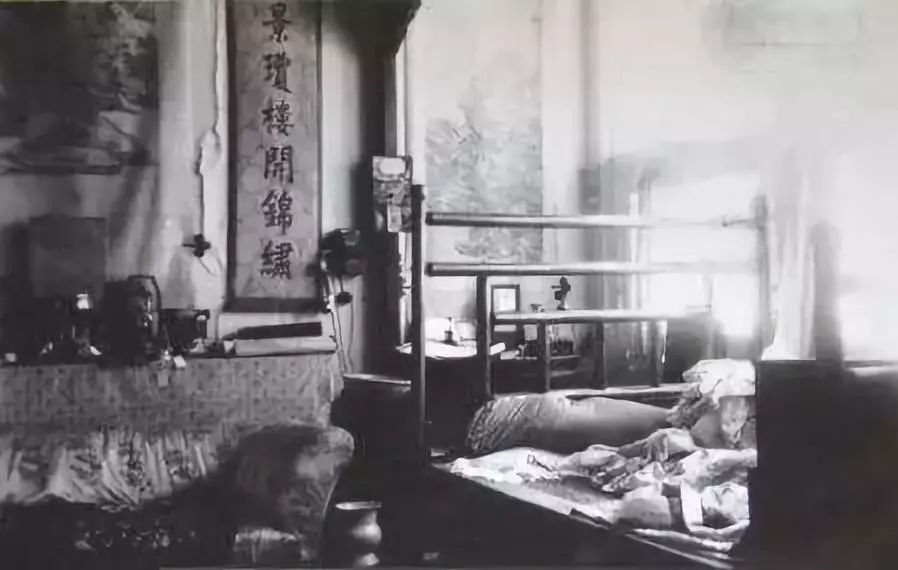
Puyi's bedroom in the Forbidden City shortly after his expulsion

On 23 October 1924, a coup led by the warlord Feng Yuxiang took control of Beijing. Feng, the latest of the warlords to take Beijing, was seeking political legitimacy and decided that abolishing the unpopular Articles of Favourable Settlement was an easy way to win the crowd's approval. His contemporary supporters stated that Marshal Feng wanted to make clear to the people that China was an established republic. Feng unilaterally revised the "Articles of Favourable Treatment" on 5 November 1924, abolishing Puyi's imperial title and privileges and reducing him to a private citizen of the Republic of China. Puyi was expelled from the Forbidden City the same day. He was given three hours to leave. He spent a few days at the house of his father Prince Chun, and then temporarily resided in the Japanese embassy in Beijing. Puyi left his father's house together with Johnston and his chief servant Big Li without informing Prince Chun's servants, slipped his followers, and went to the Japanese legation. Puyi had originally wanted to go to the British Legation, but Johnston had insisted that he would be safer with the Japanese. For Johnston, the system where the Japanese people worshipped their emperor as a living god was much closer to his ideal than the British constitutional monarchy, and he constantly steered Puyi in a pro-Japanese direction.

However, Johnston tried to get the British diplomatic legation in Beijing to host Puyi, and although the British authorities were not very interested in welcoming the former emperor, the British representative eventually gave Johnston his consent. However, Johnston later discovered that Puyi – in view of the situation and that Johnston was not returning from his efforts – had taken refuge in the Japanese legation after being advised by Zheng Xiaoxu. The Japanese diplomat Kenkichi Yoshizawa gave Puyi the regards of the Japanese government, saying, "Our government has formally acknowledged Your Majesty's taking refuge in our legation and will provide protection for you." Puyi's adviser Lu Zongyu, who was secretly working for the Japanese, suggested that Puyi move to Tianjin, which he argued was safer than Beijing, though the real reason was that the Japanese felt that Puyi would be easier to control in Tianjin without the embarrassment of having him live in the Japanese Legation, which was straining relations with China. On 23 February 1925, Puyi left Beijing for Tianjin wearing a simple Chinese gown and skullcap as he was afraid of being robbed on the train. Puyi described his train journey to Tianjin, saying, "At every stop between Beijing and Tianjin several Japanese policeman and special agents in black suits would get on the train so that, by the time we reached Tianjin, my special car was almost half occupied by them."

== Residence in Tianjin (1925–1931) ==
In February 1925, Puyi moved to the Japanese concession of Tianjin, first into the Zhang Garden, and in 1929 into the former residence of Lu Zongyu known as the Garden of Serenity. A British journalist, Henry Woodhead, called Puyi's court a "doggy paradise" as both Puyi and Wanrong were dog lovers who owned several very spoiled dogs while Puyi's courtiers spent an inordinate amount of time feuding with one another. Woodhead stated that the only people who seemed to get along at Puyi's court were Wanrong and Wenxiu, who were "like sisters". Tianjin was, after Shanghai, the most cosmopolitan Chinese city, with large British, French, German, Russian and Japanese communities. As an emperor, Puyi was allowed to join several social clubs that normally only admitted whites. During this period, Puyi and his advisers Chen Baochen, Zheng Xiaoxu, and Luo Zhenyu discussed plans to restore Puyi as Emperor. Zheng and Luo favoured enlisting assistance from external parties, while Chen opposed the idea. In June 1925, Puyi was visited by Zhang Zuolin the warlord who ruled Manchuria. Zhang promised to restore the Qing in exchange for financial assistance for his army. Zhang warned Puyi in a "roundabout way" not to trust his Japanese friends. Zhang received funds from the Japanese, but by this time his relations with the Kwantung Army were becoming strained. In June 1927, Zhang captured Beijing and Behr observed that if Puyi had returned to Beijing, he might have been restored to the Dragon Throne. Puyi was quoted to have said, in a 1927 article in The Illustrated London News, that "I never wish to be Emperor again".

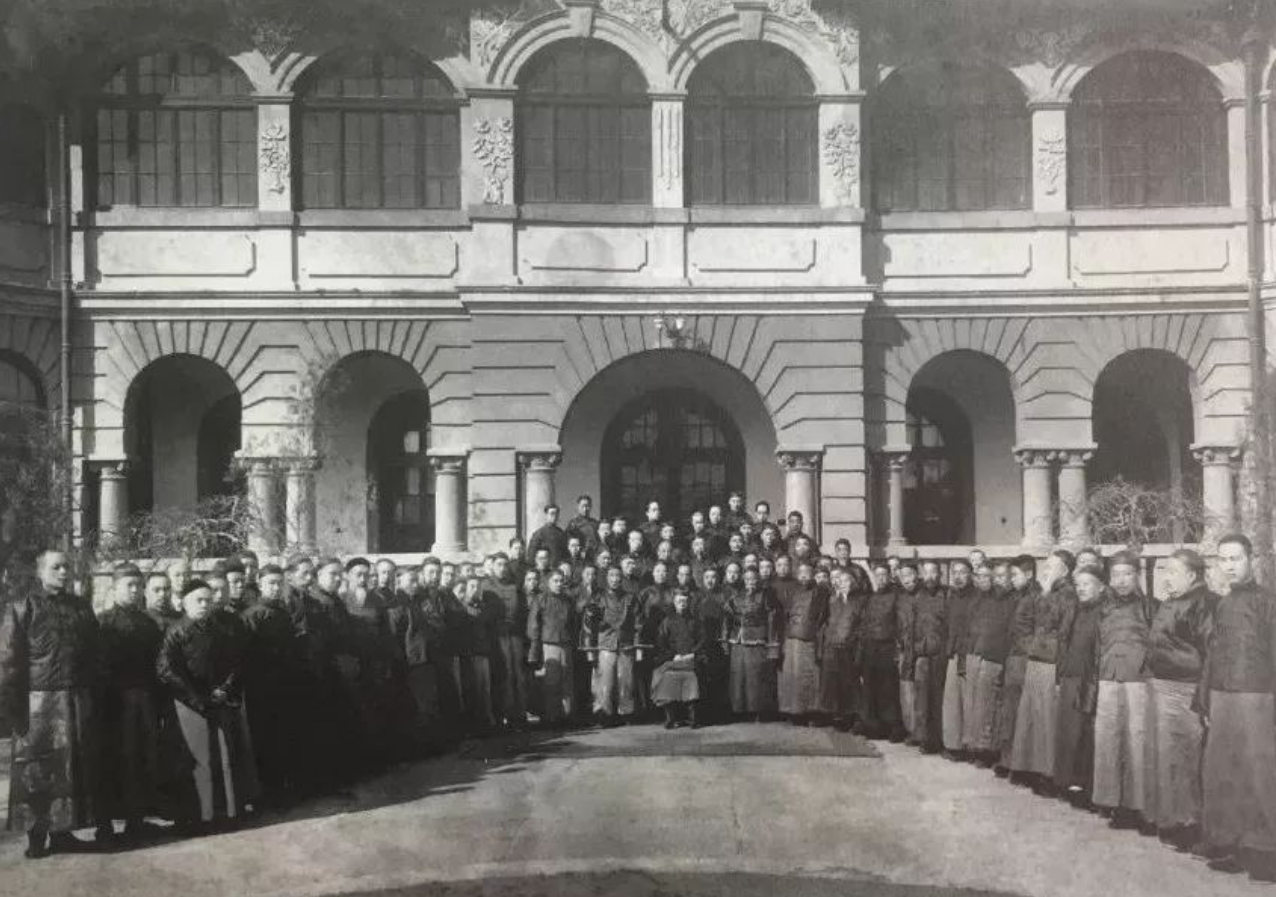
Puyi in the Garden of Serenity, as it looked in the late 1920s and early 1930s

Puyi's court was prone to factionalism and his advisers were urging him to back different warlords, which gave him a reputation for duplicity as he negotiated with various warlords, which strained his relations with Marshal Zhang. At various times, Puyi met Zhang Zongchang, the "Dogmeat General", and the White Russian émigré general Grigory Semyonov at his Tianjin house; both of them promised to restore him to the Dragon Throne if he gave them enough money, and both of them kept the money he gave them for themselves. Another visitor was Colonel Kenji Doihara, a Japanese army officer fluent in Mandarin, who flattered Puyi and encouraged him to seek restoration in Manchuria.

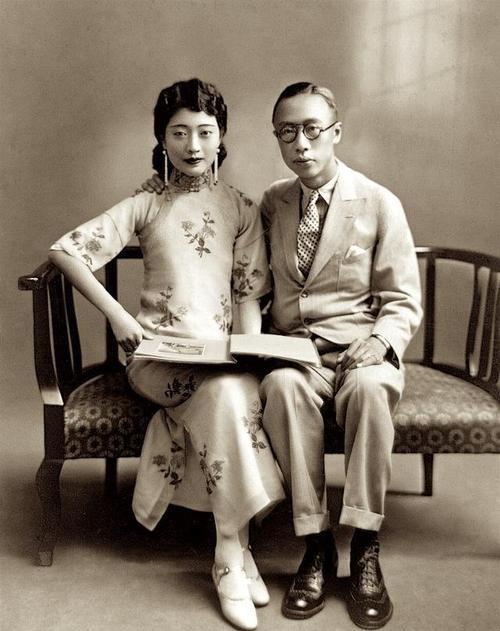
Puyi and Wanrong in Tianjin, 1920s

In 1928, during the Northern Expedition to reunify China, Sun Dianying, a warlord who had switched allegiances from Zhang to Chiang Kai-shek after the latter's Kuomintang army took Beijing from Zhang, sacked the Qing tombs outside Beijing. The news that the Qing tombs had been plundered and the corpse of Empress Dowager Cixi desecrated deeply offended Puyi. He never forgave the Kuomintang and held Chiang personally responsible—partly due to allegations that Kuomintang leaders, including Madame Chiang, had accepted bribes from Sun's looting. The incident underscored Puyi’s painful realization of his lack of powerful support and contributed to his decision to turn to the Japanese.

During his time in Tianjin, Puyi was besieged with visitors asking him for money, including various members of the vast house of Aisin-Gioro, old Manchu bannermen, journalists prepared to write articles calling for a Qing restoration for the right price, and eunuchs who had once lived in the Forbidden City and were now living in poverty. Puyi was often bored with his life, and engaged in maniacal shopping to compensate, recalling that he was addicted to "buying pianos, watches, clocks, radios, Western clothes, leather shoes, and spectacles".

Puyi's first wife, Wanrong, continued to smoke opium recreationally during this period. Their marriage began to fall apart as they spent more and more time apart, meeting only at mealtimes. Puyi wrote in his memoir:

Even if I had had only one wife she would not have found life with me interesting since my preoccupation was my restoration. Frankly, I did not know anything about love. In other marriages husband and wife were equal, but to me wife and consort were both the slaves and tools of their master.

Wanrong complained that her life as an "empress" was extremely dull as the rules for an empress forbade her from going out dancing as she wanted, instead forcing her to spend her days in traditional rituals that she found to be meaningless, all the more so as China was a republic and her title of empress was symbolic only. The westernised Wanrong loved to go out dancing, play tennis, wear western clothes and make-up, listen to jazz music, and to socialise with her friends, which the more conservative courtiers all objected to. She resented having to play the traditional role of a Chinese empress, but was unwilling to break with Puyi. Puyi's sister Yunhe noted in her diary in September 1930, that Puyi had told her that "yesterday the Empress flew into rage saying that she had been bullied by me and she poured out terrible and absurd words". In 1931, Puyi's concubine Wenxiu declared that she had had enough of him and his court and simply walked out, filing for divorce.

== Captive in Manchuria (1931–1932) ==
In September 1931, Puyi sent a letter to Jirō Minami, the Japanese Minister of War, expressing his desire to be restored to the throne. On the night of 18 September 1931, the Mukden incident began when the Japanese Kwantung Army blew up a section of railroad belonging to the Japanese-owned South Manchurian Railroad company and blamed the warlord Marshal Zhang Xueliang. On this pretext the Kwantung Army began a general offensive with the aim of conquering all of Manchuria. Puyi was visited by Kenji Doihara, head of the espionage office of the Japanese Kwantung Army, who proposed establishing Puyi as head of a Manchurian state. The Japanese further bribed a café worker to tell Puyi that a contract was out on his life in an attempt to frighten Puyi into moving.

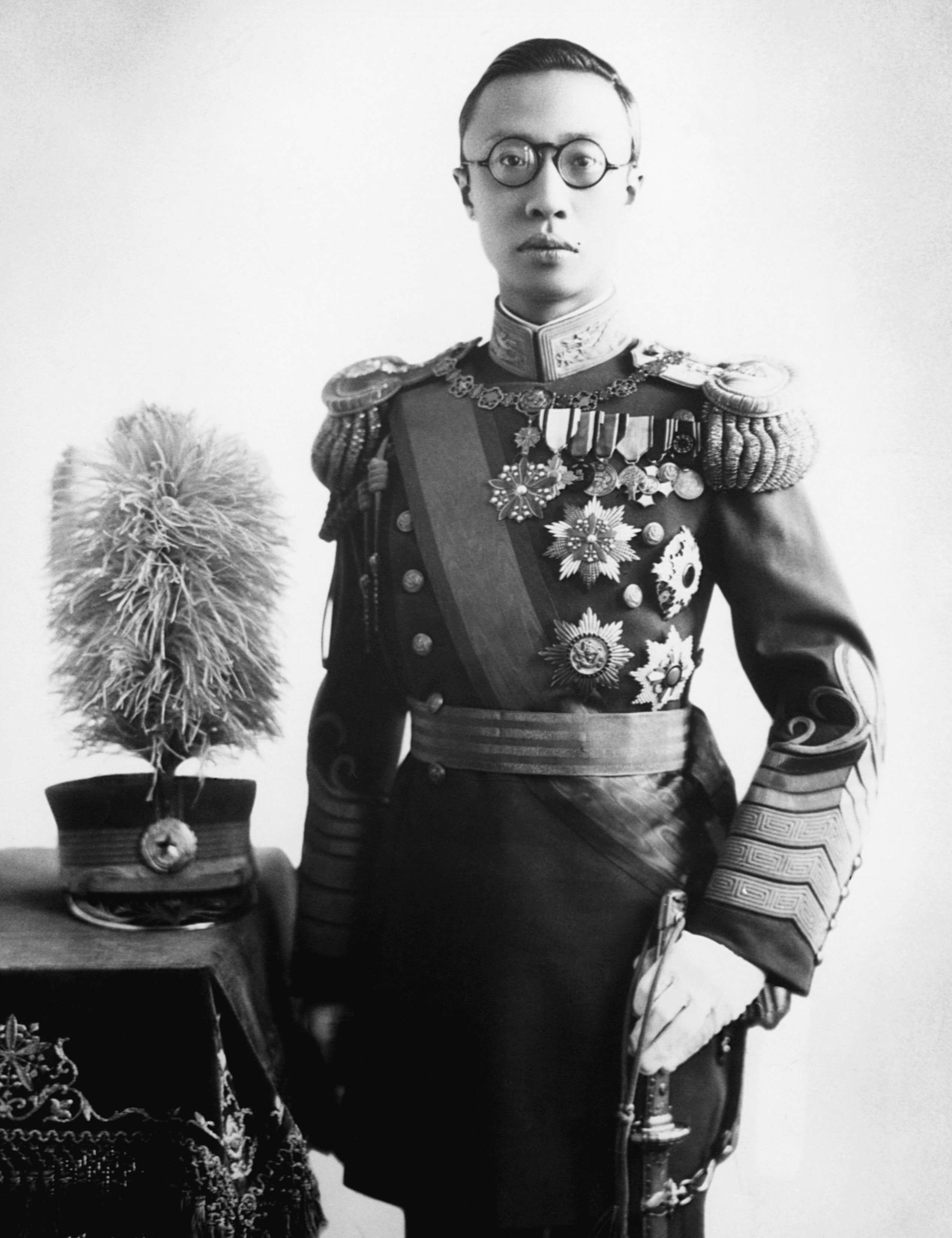
Formal portrait, c. 1930s

The Empress Wanrong was firmly against Puyi's plans to go to Manchuria, which she called treason, and for a moment Puyi hesitated, leading Doihara to send for Puyi's relative, the very pro-Japanese Yoshiko Kawashima (also known as "Eastern Jewel", Dongzhen), to visit him to change his mind. In the Tientsin Incident of November 1931, Puyi and Zheng Xiaoxu travelled to Manchuria to complete plans for the puppet state of Manchukuo. Puyi left his house in Tianjin by hiding in the trunk of a car. The Chinese government ordered his arrest for treason, but was unable to breach the Japanese protection. Puyi boarded a Japanese ship that took him across the Bohai, and when he landed in Port Arthur (modern Lüshun), he was greeted by the Japanese agent Masahiko Amakasu, who escorted him to a resort owned by the South Manchurian Railroad company. Chen Baochen returned to Beijing, where he died in 1935.

Once he arrived in Manchuria, Puyi discovered that he was a prisoner and was not allowed outside the Yamato Hotel, ostensibly to protect him from assassination. Wanrong had stayed in Tianjin, and remained opposed to Puyi's decision to work with the Japanese, requiring her friend Kawashima to visit numerous times to convince her to go to Manchuria. Wanrong ultimately accepted Kawashimas's argument that it was her duty as a wife to follow her husband, and six weeks after the Tientsin incident, she too crossed the East China Sea to Port Arthur escorted by Kawashima.

In early 1932, General Seishirō Itagaki informed Puyi that the new state was to be a republic with him as Chief Executive; the capital was to be Changchun; his form of address was to be "Your Excellency", not "Your Imperial Majesty"; and that Manchukuo would have a national assembly, all of which displeased Puyi, as it went against his idea of a restored Qing empire. When Puyi objected to these plans, Itagaki suggested that in a few years Manchukuo might adopt the monarchy. The next day Itagaki told Puyi there would be no alternative to this proposal. Zheng Xiaoxu, who had been promised the position of prime minister of Manchukuo, persuaded Puyi to accept these terms. In Japanese propaganda, Puyi was always celebrated both in traditionalist terms as a Confucian "Sage King" out to restore virtue and as a revolutionary who would end the oppression of the common people by a program of wholesale modernisation.

== Chief Executive of Manchukuo (1932–1934) ==
Puyi and Wanrong travelling to Changchun in March 1932

Puyi accepted the Japanese offer and on 1 March 1932 was installed as the Chief Executive of Manchukuo, a puppet state of the Empire of Japan, under the era name Datong. One contemporary commentator, Wen Yuan-ning, quipped that Puyi had now achieved the dubious distinction of having been "made emperor three times without knowing why and apparently without relishing it." An article by the Associated Press in 1933 stated: "There is probably no more democratic or friendlier ruler in the world than Henry Pu-yi, former Emperor of China and now Chief Executive of the new State of Manchukuo."

Puyi believed that his reign over Manchukuo was just the beginning, and he believed that within a few years, he would reign as Emperor of China again, having the yellow imperial dragon robes which were used for the coronation of Qing emperors brought from Beijing to Changchun. At the time, Japanese propaganda depicted the birth of Manchukuo as a triumph of Pan-Asianism, with the "five races" of Japanese, Chinese, Koreans, Manchus, and Mongols coming together, which marked nothing less than the birth of a new civilisation and a turning point in world history. A press statement issued on 1 March 1932 stated: "The glorious advent of Manchukuo with the eyes of the world turned on it was an epochal event of far-reaching consequence in world history, marking the birth of a new era in government, racial relations, and other affairs of general interest. Never in the chronicles of the human race was any State born with such high ideals, and never has any State accomplished so much in such a brief space of its existence as Manchukuo".

On 8 March 1932, Puyi made his ceremonial entry into Changchun, sharing his car with Zheng, who was beaming with joy, Amakasu, whose expression was stern as usual, and Wanrong, who looked miserable. Puyi also noted he was "too preoccupied with my hopes and hates" to realise the "cold comfort that the Changchun citizens, silent from terror and hatred, were giving me". Puyi's friend, the British journalist Woodhead wrote, "outside official circles, I met no Chinese who felt any enthusiasm for the new regime", and that the city of Harbin was being terrorised by Chinese and Russian gangsters working for the Japanese, making Harbin "lawless ... even its main street unsafe after dark". In an interview with Woodhead, Puyi said he planned to govern Manchukuo "in the Confucian spirit" and that he was "perfectly happy" with his new position.

On 20 April 1932, the Lytton Commission arrived in Manchuria to begin its investigation of whether Japan had committed aggression. Puyi was interviewed by Victor Bulwer-Lytton, 2nd Earl of Lytton, and recalled thinking that he desperately wanted to ask him for political asylum in Britain, but as General Itagaki was sitting right next to him at the meeting, he told Lytton that "the masses of the people had begged me to come, that my stay here was absolutely voluntary and free". After the interview, Itagaki told Puyi: "Your Excellency's manner was perfect; you spoke beautifully". The diplomat Wellington Koo, who was attached to the commission as its Chinese assessor, received a secret message saying "... a representative of the imperial household in Changchun wanted to see me and had a confidential message for me". The representative, posing as an antique dealer, "... told me he was sent by the Empress: She wanted me to help her escape from Changchun. He said she found life miserable there because she was surrounded in her house by Japanese maids. Every movement of hers was watched and reported". Koo said he was "touched" but could do nothing to help Wanrong escape, which her brother Runqi said was the "final blow" to her, leading her into a downward spiral. Right from the start, the Japanese occupation had sparked much resistance by guerrillas, whom the Kwantung Army called "bandits". General Doihara was able in exchange for a multi-million dollar bribe to get one of the more prominent guerrilla leaders, the Manchu general Ma Zhanshan, to accept Japanese rule, and had Puyi appoint him Defence Minister. Much to the intense chagrin of Puyi and his Japanese masters, Ma's defection turned out to be a ruse, and only months after Puyi appointed him Defence Minister, Ma took his troops over the border to the Soviet Union to continue the struggle against the Japanese.

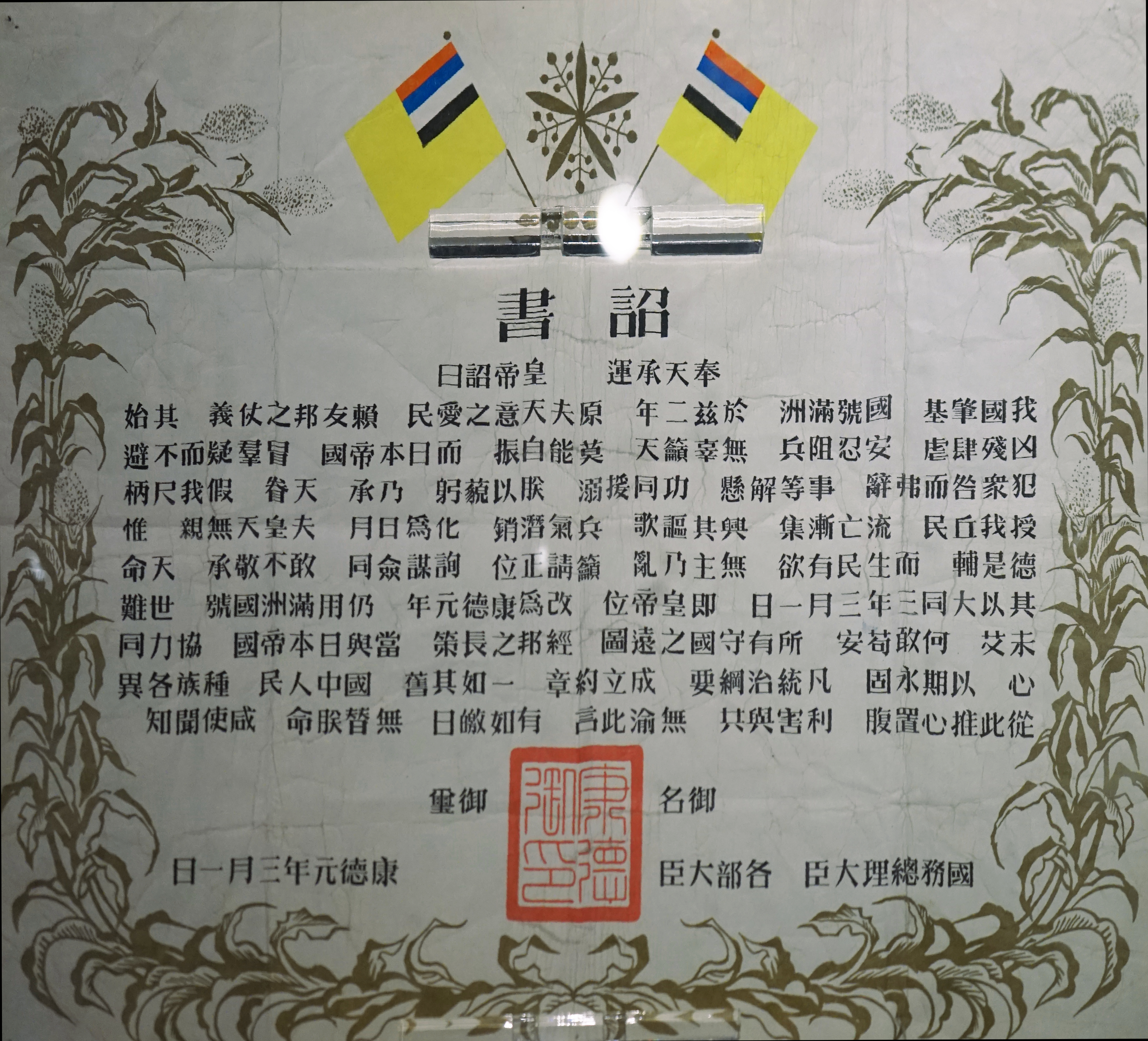
Puyi's edict upon ascending to the throne

Japanese emperor Hirohito wanted to see if Puyi was reliable before giving him an imperial title, and it was not until October 1933 that General Doihara told him he was to be an emperor again, causing Puyi to go, in his own words, "wild with joy", though he was disappointed that he was not given back his old title of "Great Qing Emperor". At the same time, Doihara informed Puyi that "the Emperor [of Japan] is your father and is represented in Manchukuo as the Kwantung army which must be obeyed like a father". Manchukuo was immediately infamous for its high crime rate, as Japanese-sponsored gangs of Chinese, Korean, and Russian gangsters fought one another for the control of opium houses, brothels, and gambling dens. There were nine different Japanese or Japanese-sponsored police/intelligence agencies operating in Manchukuo, who were all told by Tokyo that Japan was a poor country and that they were to pay for their own operations by engaging in organised crime. The Italian adventurer Amleto Vespa remembered that General Kenji Doihara told him Manchuria was going to have to pay for its own exploitation. In 1933, Simon Kaspé, a French Jewish pianist visiting his father in Manchukuo, who owned a hotel in Harbin, was kidnapped, tortured, and murdered by an anti-Semitic gang from the Russian Fascists. The Kaspé case became an international cause célèbre, attracting much media attention around the world, ultimately leading to two trials in Harbin in 1935 and 1936, as the evidence that the Russian fascist gang who had killed Kaspé was working for the Kempeitai, the military police of the Imperial Japanese Army, had become too strong for even Tokyo to ignore. Puyi was portrayed as having saved the people from the chaotic Zhang family rule, with the help of the Kwantung Army. Manchukuo's high crime rate, and the much publicised Kaspé case, made a mockery of the claim that Puyi had saved the people of Manchuria from a lawless and violent regime.

== Emperor of Manchukuo (1934–1945) ==
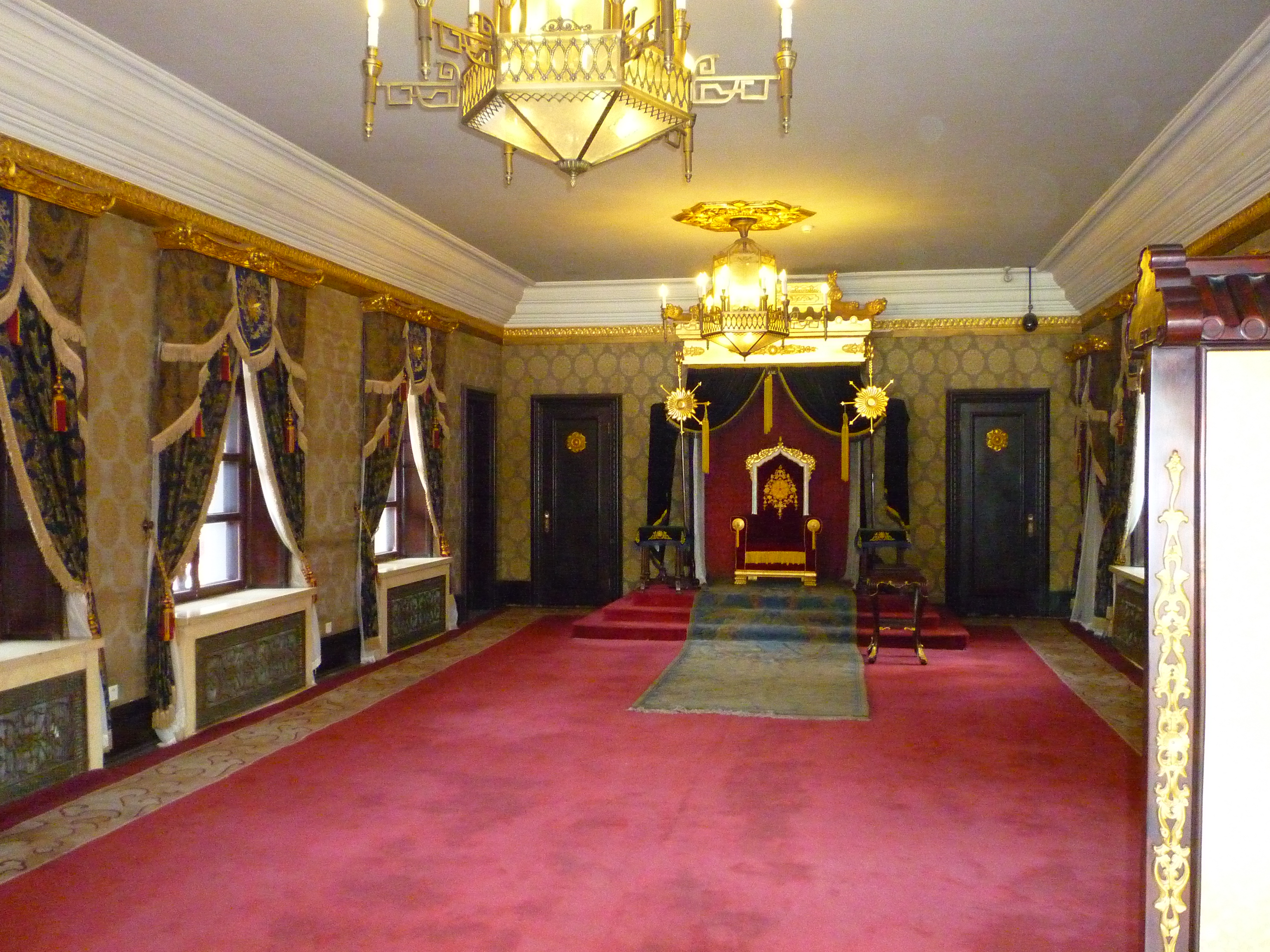
The imperial throne room, in the Museum of the Imperial Palace of Manchukuo

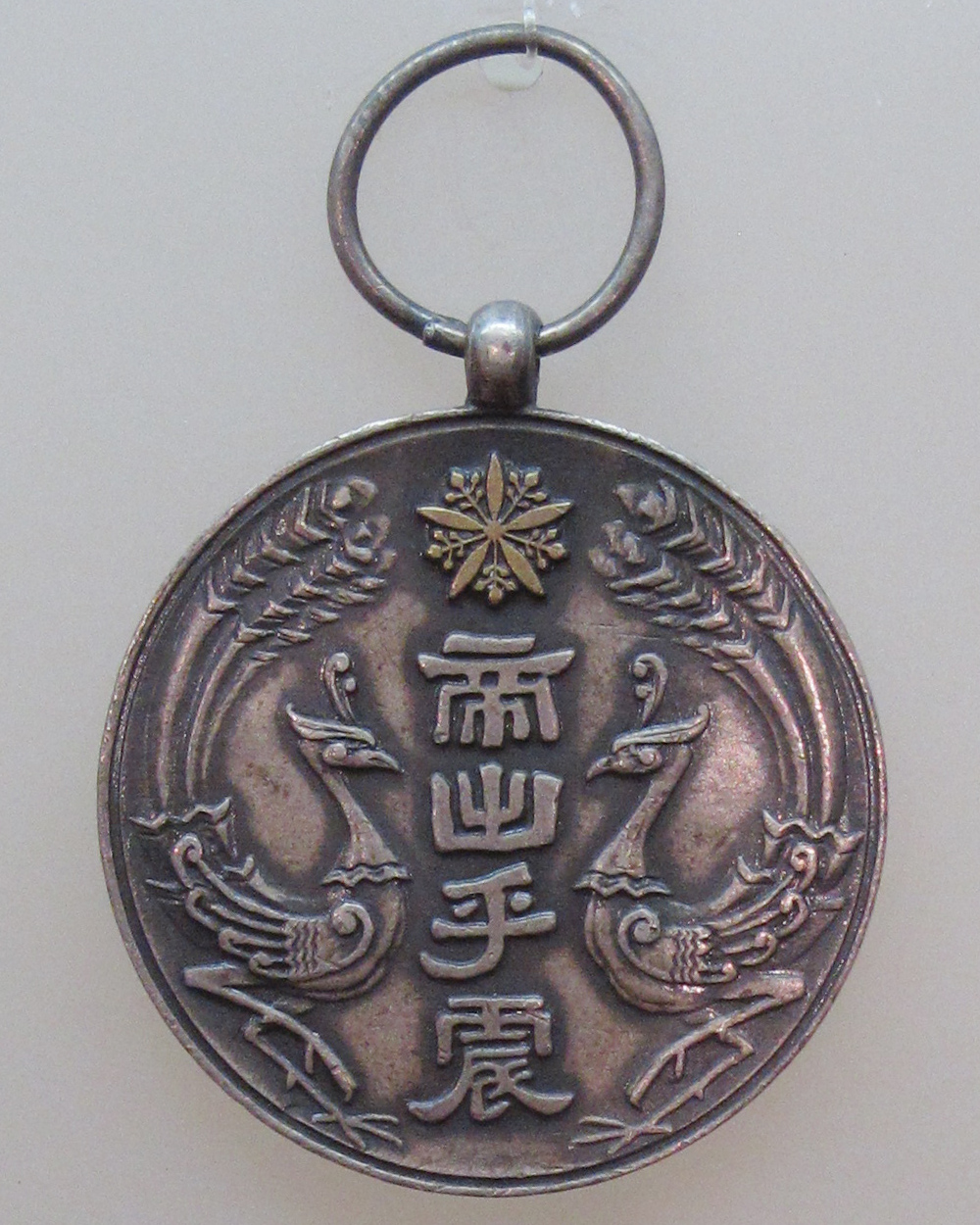
Commemorative medal from Puyi's enthronement

Imperial seal as the Kangde Emperor.

On 1 March 1934, Puyi was crowned Emperor of Manchukuo, under the regnal title "Kangde" in Changchun. Wanrong was excluded from the coronation: her addiction to opium and anti-Japanese feelings had made her embarrassing for Puyi. Though submissive in public to the Japanese, Puyi was constantly at odds with them in private. He resented being "Chief Executive" and then "Emperor of Manchukuo" rather than being fully restored as a Qing Emperor. At his enthronement, he clashed with Japan over dress; they wanted him to wear a military uniform, whereas he wanted to wear the traditional Manchu robes. In a typical compromise, he wore a Western military uniform to his enthronement and a dragon robe to the announcement of his accession at the Temple of Heaven. Puyi was driven to his coronation in a Lincoln limousine with bulletproof windows followed by nine Packards, and during his coronation scrolls were read out while sacred wine bottles were opened for the guests to celebrate the beginning of a "Reign of Tranquillity and Virtue". The invitations for the coronation were issued by the Kwantung Army and 70% of those who attended Puyi's coronation were Japanese. Time magazine published an article about Puyi's coronation in March 1934.

The Japanese chose Changchun as Manchukuo's capital, which was renamed Xinjing. Puyi had wanted the capital to be Mukden (modern Shenyang), which had been the Qing capital before the conquest of the Ming in 1644, but was overruled by his Japanese masters. Puyi hated Xinjing, which he regarded as an undistinguished industrial city that lacked the historical connections with the Qing that Mukden had. As there was no palace in Changchun, Puyi moved into what had once been the office of the Salt Tax Administration during the Russian period, and as result, the building was known as Salt Tax Palace, which is now the Museum of the Imperial Palace of Manchukuo. Puyi lived there as a virtual prisoner and could not leave without permission. Shortly after Puyi's coronation, his father arrived at the Xinjing railroad station for a visit. Prince Chun told his son that he was an idiot if he really believed that the Japanese were going to restore him to the Dragon Throne, and warned him that he was just being used. The Japanese embassy issued a note of diplomatic protest at the welcome extended to Prince Chun, stating that the Xinjing railroad station was under the Kwantung Army's control, that only Japanese soldiers were allowed there, and that they would not tolerate the Manchukuo imperial guard being used to welcome visitors at the Xinjing railroad station again.

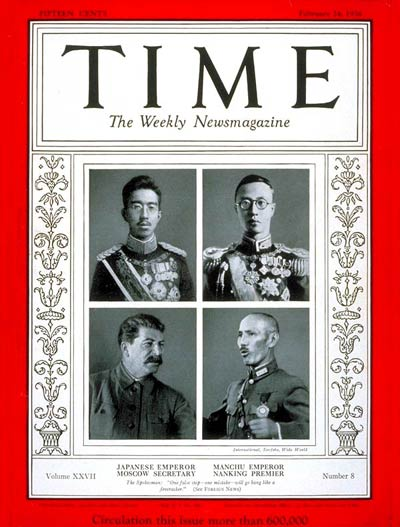
February 1936 cover of Time depicting Hirohito, Puyi, Joseph Stalin and Chiang Kai-shek

In this period, Puyi frequently visited the provinces of Manchukuo to open factories and mines, took part in the birthday celebrations for Hirohito at Kwantung Army headquarters and, on the Japanese holiday of Memorial Day, formally paid his respects with Japanese rituals to the souls of the Japanese soldiers killed fighting the "bandits"—as the Japanese called all the guerrillas fighting against their rule of Manchuria. Following the example in Japan, schoolchildren in Manchukuo at the beginning of every school day kowtowed first in the direction of Tokyo and then to a portrait of Puyi in the classroom. Puyi found this "intoxicating". He visited a coal mine and in his rudimentary Japanese thanked the Japanese foreman for his good work, who burst into tears as he thanked the emperor; Puyi later wrote that "The treatment I received really went to my head."

Whenever the Japanese wanted a law passed, the relevant decree was dropped off at Salt Tax Palace for Puyi to sign, which he always did. Puyi signed decrees expropriating vast tracts of farmland to Japanese colonists and a law declaring certain thoughts to be "thought crimes", leading Behr to note: "In theory, as 'Supreme Commander', he thus bore full responsibility for Japanese atrocities committed in his name on anti-Japanese 'bandits' and patriotic Chinese citizens." Behr further noted the "Empire of Manchukuo", billed as an idealistic state where the "five races" of the Chinese, Japanese, Koreans, Manchus, and Mongols had come together in Pan-Asian brotherhood, was in fact "one of the most brutally run countries in the world – a textbook example of colonialism, albeit of the Oriental kind". American historian Carter Eckert wrote that the differences in power could be seen in that the Kwantung Army had a "massive" headquarters in downtown Xinjing while Puyi had to live in the "small and shabby" Salt Tax Palace close to the main railroad station in a part of Xinjing with numerous small factories, warehouses, and slaughterhouses, the chief prison, and the red-light district.

Behr commented that Puyi knew from his talks in Tianjin with General Kenji Doihara and General Seishirō Itagaki that he was dealing with "ruthless men and that this might be the regime to expect". Puyi later recalled that: "I had put my head in the tiger's mouth" by going to Manchuria in 1931.

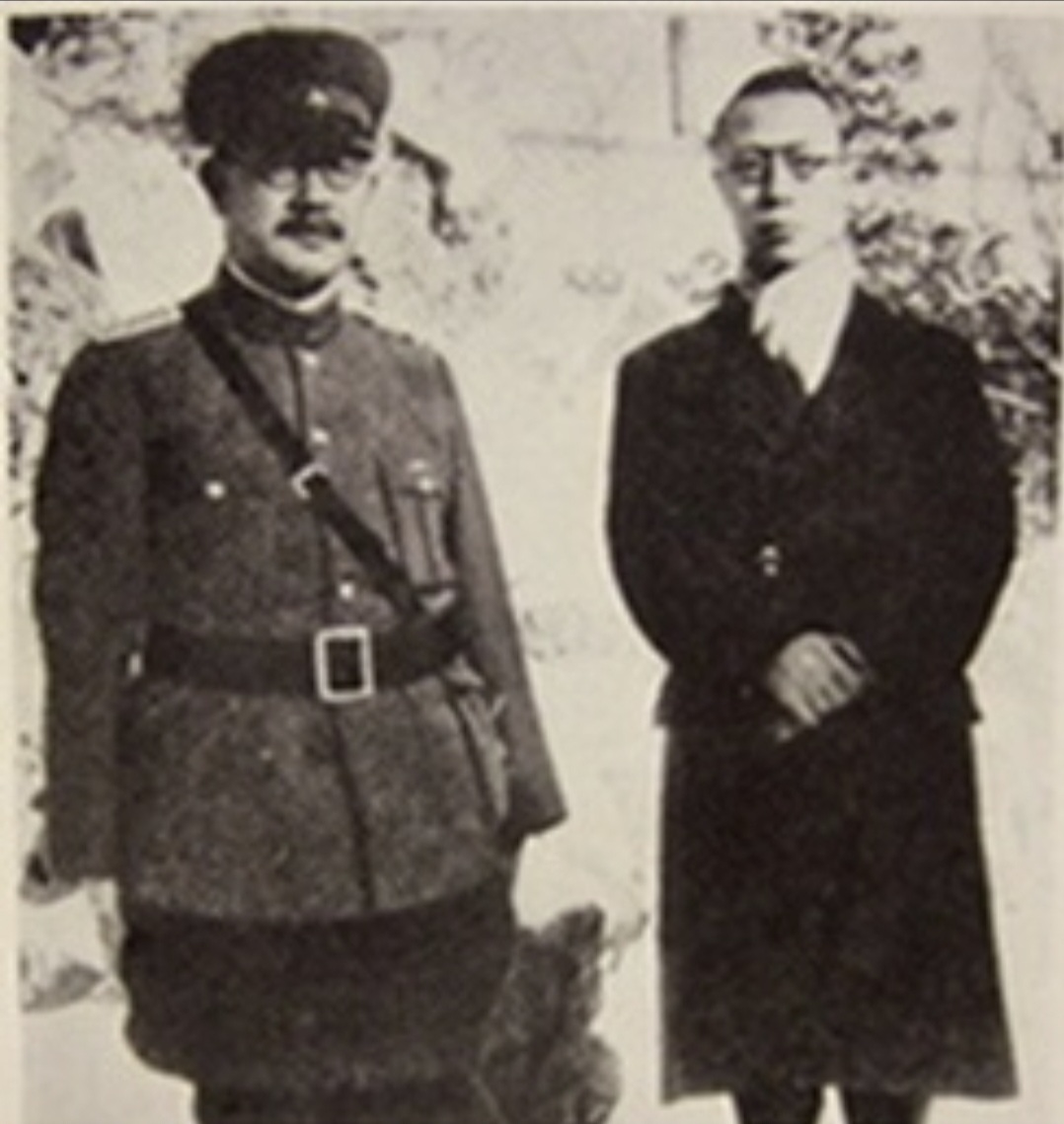
Puyi (right) as Emperor of Manchukuo, with Chū Kudō

From 1935 to 1945, Kwantung Army senior staff officer Yoshioka Yasunao (吉岡 安則) was assigned to Puyi as attaché to the Imperial Household in Manchukuo. He acted as a spy for the Japanese government, controlling Puyi through fear, intimidation, and direct orders. There were many attempts on Puyi's life during this period, including a 1937 stabbing by a palace servant.

In 1935, Puyi visited Japan. The Second Secretary of the Japanese Embassy in Xinjing, Kenjiro Hayashide, served as Puyi's interpreter during this trip, and later wrote what Behr called a very absurd book, The Epochal Journey to Japan, chronicling this visit, where he managed to present every banal statement made by Puyi as profound wisdom, and claimed that he wrote an average of two poems per day on his trip to Japan, despite being busy with attending all sorts of official functions. Hayashide had also written a booklet promoting the trip in Japan, which claimed that Puyi was a great reader who was "hardly ever seen without a book in his hand", a skilled calligrapher, a talented painter, and an excellent horseman and archer, able to shoot arrows while riding, just like his Qing ancestors. Hirohito took this claim that Puyi was a hippophile seriously, and presented him with a gift of a horse for him to review the Imperial Japanese Army with; in fact, Puyi was a hippophobe who adamantly refused to get on the horse, forcing the Japanese to hurriedly bring out a carriage for the two emperors to review the troops.

After his return to Xinjing, Puyi hired an American public relations executive, George Bronson Rea, to lobby the U.S. government to recognise Manchukuo. In late 1935, Rea published a book, The Case for Manchukuo, in which Rea castigated China under the Kuomintang as hopelessly corrupt, and praised Puyi's wise leadership of Manchukuo, writing Manchukuo was "... the one step that the people of the East have taken towards escape from the misery and misgovernment that have become theirs. Japan's protection is its only chance of happiness". Rea continued to work for Puyi until the bombing of Pearl Harbor, but he ultimately failed in lobbying Washington to recognise Xinjing. At the second trial relating to the long-running Kaspé case in Harbin in March–June 1936, the Japanese prosecutor argued in favour of the six defendants, calling them "Russian patriots who raised the flag against a world danger – communism". Much to everyone's surprise, the Chinese judges convicted and sentenced the six Russian fascists who had tortured and killed Kaspé, which led to a storm as the Russian Fascist Party called the six men "martyrs for Holy Russia", and presented to Puyi a petition with thousands of signatures asking him to pardon the six men. Puyi refused to pardon the Russian fascists, but the verdict was appealed to the Xinjing Supreme Court, where the Japanese judges quashed the verdict, ordering the six men to be freed, a decision that Puyi accepted without complaint. The handling of the Kaspé case, which attracted much attention in the Western media, did much to tarnish the image of Manchukuo and further weakened Puyi's already weak hand as he sought to have the rest of the world recognise Manchukuo.

In 1936, Ling Sheng, an aristocrat who was serving as governor of one of Manchukuo's provinces and whose son was engaged to marry one of Puyi's younger sisters, was arrested after complaining about "intolerable" Japanese interference in his work, which led Puyi to ask Yoshioka if something could be done to help him out. The Kwantung Army's commander Kenkichi Ueda visited Puyi to tell him the matter was resolved as Ling had already been convicted by a Japanese court-martial of "plotting rebellion" and had been executed by beheading, which led Puyi to cancel the marriage between his sister and Ling's son. During these years, Puyi began taking a greater interest in traditional Chinese law and religion (such as Confucianism and Buddhism), but this was disallowed by the Japanese. Gradually his old supporters were eliminated and pro-Japanese ministers put in their place. During this period Puyi's life consisted mostly of signing laws prepared by Japan, reciting prayers, consulting oracles, and making formal visits throughout his state.

Puyi was extremely unhappy with his life as a virtual prisoner in the Salt Tax Palace, and his moods became erratic, swinging from hours of passivity staring into space to indulging his sadism by having his servants beaten. Puyi later wrote that his orphaned page boy servants, most of whom had had their parents killed by the Japanese, experienced such "wretched" lives in the palace they were the size of 10-year-olds at the age of 18. Puyi was obsessed by the fact that the vast majority of Puyi's "loving subjects" hated him, and as Behr observed, it was "the knowledge that he was an object of hatred and derision that drove Puyi to the brink of madness". Puyi always had a strong cruel streak, and he imposed harsh "house rules" on his staff; servants were flogged in the basement for such offences as "irresponsible conversations". The phrase "Take him downstairs" was much feared by Puyi's servants as he had at least one flogging performed a day, and everyone in the Salt Tax Palace was caned at one point or another except the Empress and Puyi's siblings and their spouses. Puyi's experience of widespread theft during his time in the Forbidden City led him to distrust his servants and he obsessively went over the account books for signs of fraud. To further torment his staff of about 100, Puyi drastically cut back on the food allocated for his staff, who suffered from hunger; Big Li told Behr that Puyi was attempting to make everyone as miserable as he was. Besides tormenting his staff, Puyi's life as Emperor was one of lethargy and passivity, which his ghostwriter Li Wenda called "a kind of living death" for him.

Puyi became a devoted Buddhist, a mystic and a vegetarian, having statues of the Buddha put up all over the Salt Tax Palace for him to pray to while banning his staff from eating meat. His Buddhism led him to ban his staff from killing insects or mice, but if he found any insects in his food, the cooks were flogged. One day, when out for a stroll in the gardens, Puyi found that a servant had written in chalk on one of the rocks: "Haven't the Japanese humiliated you enough?" When Puyi received guests at the Salt Tax Palace, he gave them long lectures on the "glorious" history of the Qing as a form of masochism, comparing the great Qing Emperors with himself, a miserable man living as a prisoner in his own palace. Wanrong, who detested her husband, liked to mock him behind his back by performing skits before the servants by putting on dark glasses and imitating Puyi's jerky movements. During his time in Tianjin, Puyi had started wearing dark glasses at all times. During the interwar period, dark glasses were worn by Tianjin's homosexual "tiny minority" to signify their orientation. Although Puyi likely knew this, surviving members of his court said that he "really was subject to eye strain and headaches from the sun's glare".

Tan Yuling, Puyi's concubine

On 3 April 1937, Puyi's younger full brother Prince Pujie was proclaimed heir presumptive after marrying Lady Hiro Saga, a distant cousin of Hirohito. The Kwantung Army general Shigeru Honjō had politically arranged the marriage. Puyi thereafter would not speak candidly in front of his brother and refused to eat any food Lady Saga provided, believing she was out to poison him. Puyi was forced to sign an agreement that if he himself had a male heir, the child would be sent to Japan to be raised by the Japanese. Puyi initially thought Lady Saga was a Japanese spy, but came to trust her after the Sinophile Saga discarded her kimono for cheongsams and repeatedly assured him that she came to the Salt Tax Palace because she was Pujie's wife, not as a spy. Behr described Lady Saga as "intelligent" and "level-headed", and noted the irony of Puyi snubbing the one Japanese who really wanted to be his friend. Later in April 1937, the 16-year-old Manchu aristocrat Tan Yuling moved into the Salt Tax Palace to become Puyi's concubine. Lady Saga tried to improve relations between Puyi and Wanrong by having them eat dinner together, which was the first time they had shared a meal in three years.

Based on his interviews with Puyi's family and staff at the Salt Tax Palace, Behr wrote that it appeared Puyi had an "attraction towards very young girls" that "bordered on paedophilia" and "that Pu Yi was bisexual, and – by his own admission – something of a sadist in his relationships with women". Puyi was very fond of having handsome teenage boys serve as his pageboys and Lady Saga noted he was also very fond of sodomising them. Lady Saga wrote in her 1957 autobiography Memoirs of A Wandering Princess:

Of course I had heard rumours concerning such great men in our history, but I never knew such things existed in the living world. Now, however, I learnt that the Emperor had an unnatural love for a pageboy. He was referred to as "the male concubine". Could these perverted habits, I wondered, have driven his wife to opium smoking?

When Behr questioned him about Puyi's sexuality, Prince Pujie said he was "biologically incapable of reproduction", a polite way of saying someone is gay in China. When one of Puyi's pageboys fled the Salt Tax Palace to escape his homosexual advances, Puyi ordered that he be given an especially harsh flogging, which caused the boy's death and led Puyi to have the floggers flogged in turn as punishment.

In July 1937, when the Second Sino-Japanese War began, Puyi issued a declaration of support for Japan. All that Puyi knew of the outside world was what General Yoshioka told him in daily briefings. When Behr asked Prince Pujie how the news of the Nanjing Massacre in December 1937 affected Puyi, his brother replied: "We didn't hear about it until much later. At the time, it made no real impact." On 4 February 1938, the strongly pro-Japanese and anti-Chinese Joachim von Ribbentrop became the German foreign minister, and under his influence German foreign policy swung in an anti-Chinese and pro-Japanese direction. On 20 February 1938, Adolf Hitler announced that Germany was recognising Manchukuo. In one of his last acts, the outgoing German ambassador to Japan Herbert von Dirksen visited Puyi in the Salt Tax Palace to tell him that a German embassy would be established in Xinjing later that year to join the embassies of Japan, El Salvador, the Dominican Republic, Costa Rica, Italy and Nationalist Spain, the only other countries that had recognised Manchukuo. In 1934, Puyi had been excited when he learned that El Salvador had become the first nation other than Japan to recognise Manchukuo, but by 1938, he did not care much about Germany's recognition of Manchukuo.

In May 1938, Puyi was declared a god by the Religions Law, and a cult of emperor-worship very similar to Japan's began with schoolchildren starting their classes by praying to a portrait of the god-emperor while imperial rescripts and the imperial regalia became sacred relics imbued with magical powers by being associated with the god-emperor. Puyi's elevation to a god was due to the war, which caused the Japanese state to begin a program of totalitarian mobilisation of society for total war in Japan and places ruled by Japan. His Japanese handlers felt that ordinary people in Japan, Korea, and Taiwan were more willing to bear the sacrifices for total war because of their devotion to their god-emperor, and it was decided that making Puyi a god-emperor would have the same effect in Manchukuo. After 1938, Puyi was hardly ever allowed to leave the Salt Tax Palace, while the creation of the puppet regime of President Wang Jingwei in November 1938 crushed Puyi's spirits, as it ended his hope of one day being restored as the Great Qing Emperor. Puyi became a hypochondriac, taking all sorts of pills for various imagined ailments and hormones to improve his sex drive and allow him to father a boy, as Puyi was convinced that the Japanese were poisoning his food to make him sterile. He believed the Japanese wanted one of the children Pujie had fathered with Lady Saga to be the next emperor, and it was a great relief to him that their children were both girls.

In 1935, Wanrong engaged in an affair with Puyi's chauffeur Li Tiyu that left her pregnant. To punish her, Wanrong's baby was killed. It is unclear what happened, but there are two accounts of what happened to Wanrong after her baby's murder. One account said that Puyi lied to Wanrong and that her daughter was being raised by a nanny, and she never knew about her daughter's death. The other account said that Wanrong had found out or knew about her daughter's infanticide and lived in a constant daze of opium consumption thereafter. Puyi had known of what was being planned for Wanrong's baby. Puyi's ghostwriter for Emperor to Citizen, Li Wenda, told Behr that when interviewing Puyi for the book that he could not get Puyi to talk about the killing of Wanrong's child, as he was too ashamed to speak of his own cowardice.

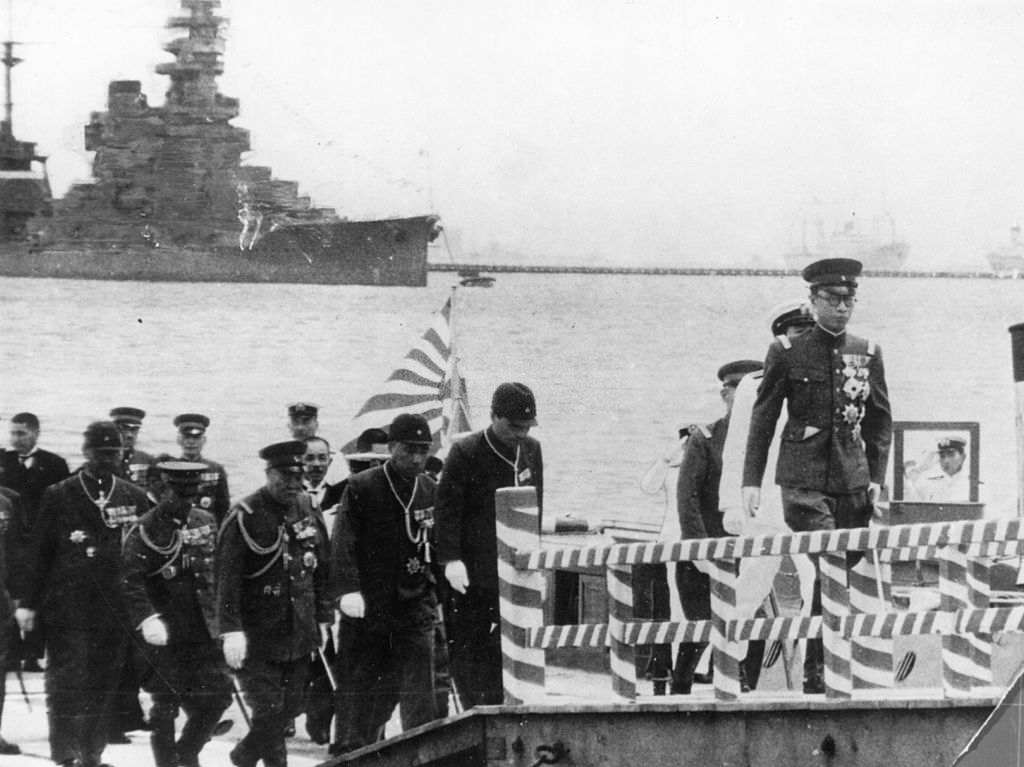
Puyi disembarks during his state visit to Japan, June 1940

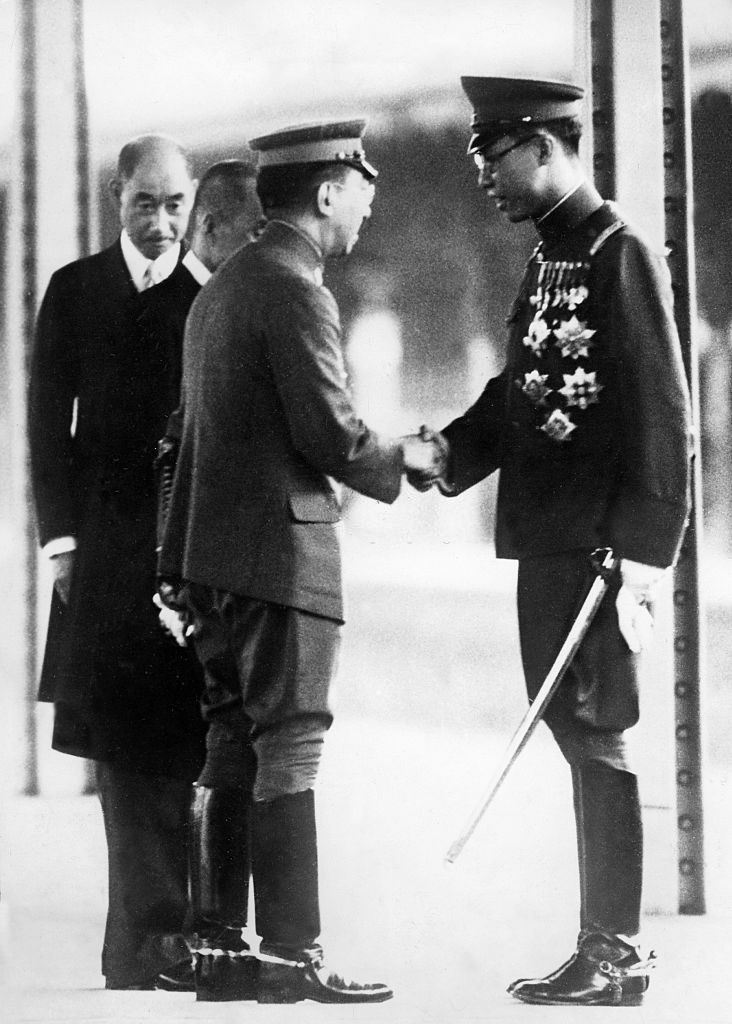
Puyi shakes hands with Emperor Hirohito at Tokyo Station

In December 1941, Puyi followed Japan in declaring war on the United States and Great Britain, but as neither nation had recognised Manchukuo, there were no reciprocal declarations of war in return. During the war, Puyi was an example and role model for at least some in Asia who believed in the Japanese pan-Asian propaganda. U Saw, the Prime Minister of Burma, was secretly in communication with the Japanese, declaring that as an Asian his sympathies were completely with Japan against the West. U Saw further added that he hoped that when Japan won the war that he would enjoy exactly the same status in Burma that Puyi enjoyed in Manchukuo as part of the Greater East Asia Co-Prosperity Sphere. During the war, Puyi became estranged from his father, as his half-brother Pu Ren stated in an interview:

... after 1941 Puyi's father had written him off. He never visited Puyi after 1934. They rarely corresponded. All the news he got was through intermediaries, or occasional reports from Puyi's younger sisters, some of whom were allowed to see him.

Puyi complained that he had issued so many "slavish" pro-Japanese statements during the war that nobody on the Allied side would take him in if he did escape from Manchukuo. In June 1942, Puyi made a rare visit outside the Salt Tax Palace when he conferred with the graduating class at the Manchukuo Military Academy, and awarded the star student Takagi Masao a gold watch for his outstanding performance; despite his Japanese name, the star student was actually Korean and under his original Korean name of Park Chung Hee became the dictator of South Korea in 1961. In August 1942, Puyi's concubine Tan Yuling fell ill and died after being treated by the same Japanese doctors who murdered Wanrong's baby. Puyi testified at the Tokyo war crimes trial of his belief that she was murdered. Puyi kept a lock of Tan's hair and her nail clippings for the rest of his life as he expressed much sadness over her loss. He refused to take a Japanese concubine to replace Tan and, in 1943, took a Chinese concubine, Li Yuqin, the 16-year-old daughter of a waiter. Puyi liked Li, but his main interest continued to be his pageboys, as he later wrote: "These actions of mine go to show how cruel, mad, violent and unstable I was."

For much of World War II, Puyi, confined to the Salt Tax Palace, believed that Japan was winning the war, and it was not until 1944 that he started to doubt this after the Japanese press began to report "heroic sacrifices" in Burma and on Pacific islands while air raid shelters started to be built in Manchukuo. Puyi's nephew Jui Lon told Behr: "He desperately wanted America to win the war." Big Li said: "When he thought it was safe, he would sit at the piano and do a one-finger version of the Stars and Stripes." In mid-1944, Puyi finally acquired the courage to start occasionally tuning in his radio to Chinese broadcasts and to Chinese-language broadcasts by the Americans, where he was shocked to learn that Japan had suffered so many defeats since 1942.

Puyi had to give a speech before a group of Japanese infantrymen who had volunteered to be "human bullets", promising to strap explosives on their bodies and to stage suicide attacks to die for Hirohito. Puyi commented as he read out his speech praising the glories of dying for the Emperor: "Only then did I see the ashen grey of their faces and the tears flowing down their cheeks and hear their sobbing." Puyi commented that he felt terrified at the fanaticism of bushido which negated the value of human life, with dying for the emperor being all that mattered.

=== Collapse of Manchukuo (1945) ===
On 9 August 1945, the Kwantung Army's commander General Otozō Yamada told Puyi that the Soviet Union had declared war on Japan and the Red Army had entered Manchukuo. Yamada assured Puyi that the Kwantung Army would easily defeat the Red Army, when the air raid sirens sounded and the Red Air Force began a bombing raid, forcing all to hide in the basement. While Puyi prayed to the Buddha, Yamada fell silent as the bombs fell, destroying Japanese barracks next to the Salt Tax Palace. During the invasion, 1,577,725 Soviet and Mongol troops stormed into Manchuria in a combined arms offensive with tanks, artillery, cavalry, aircraft and infantry working closely together that overwhelmed the Kwantung Army, who had not expected a Soviet invasion until 1946 and were short of both tanks and anti-tank guns.

Puyi was terrified to hear that the Mongolian People's Army had joined Operation August Storm, as he believed that the Mongols would torture him to death if they captured him. The next day, Yamada told Puyi that the Soviets had already broken through the defence lines in northern Manchukuo, but the Kwantung Army would "hold the line" in southern Manchukuo and Puyi must leave at once. The staff of the Salt Tax Palace were thrown into panic as Puyi ordered all of his treasures to be boxed up and shipped out; in the meantime Puyi observed from his window that soldiers of the Manchukuo Imperial Army were taking off their uniforms and deserting. To test the reaction of his Japanese masters, Puyi put on his uniform of Commander-in-Chief of the Manchukuo Army and announced "We must support the holy war of our Parental Country with all our strength, and must resist the Soviet armies to the end, to the very end". With that, Yoshioka fled the room, which showed Puyi that the war was lost. At one point, a group of Japanese soldiers arrived at the Salt Tax Palace, and Puyi believed they had come to kill him, but they merely went away after seeing him stand at the top of the staircase. Most of the staff at the Salt Tax Palace had already fled, and Puyi found that his phone calls to the Kwantung Army HQ went unanswered as most of the officers had already left for Korea and the people of Changchun booed him when his car, flying imperial standards, took him to the railroad station.

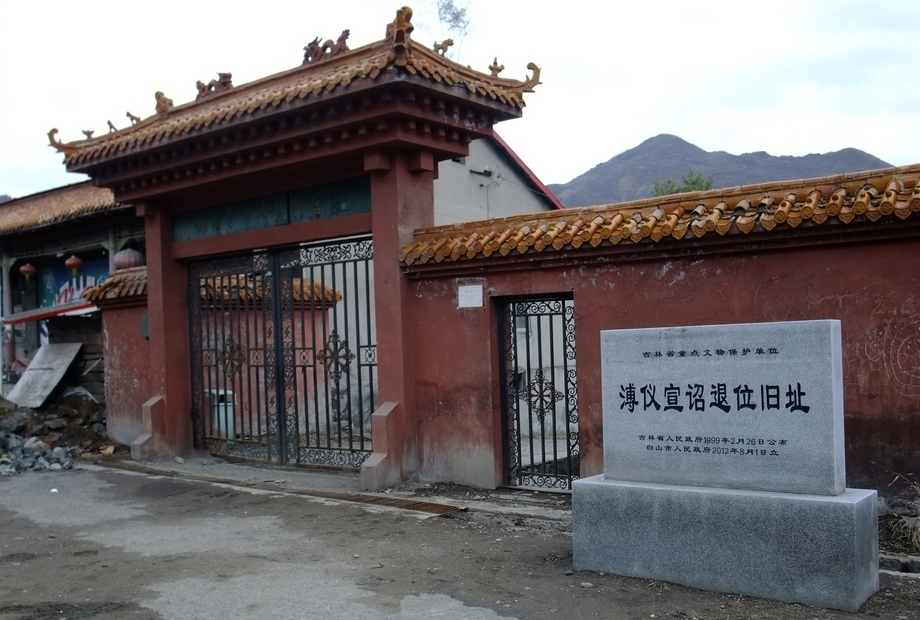
The site of Puyi's abdication in a small mining office complex in Dalizi, Baishan

Late on the night of 11 August 1945, a train carrying Puyi, his court, his ministers and the Qing treasures left Changchun. Puyi saw thousands of panic-stricken Japanese settlers fleeing south in vast columns across the roads of the countryside. At every railroad station, hundreds of Japanese colonists attempted to board his train; Puyi remembered them weeping and begging Japanese gendarmes to let them pass, and at several stations, Japanese soldiers and gendarmes fought one another. General Yamada boarded the train as it meandered south and told Puyi "the Japanese Army was winning and had destroyed large numbers of tanks and aircraft", a claim that nobody aboard the train believed. On 15 August 1945, Puyi heard on the radio the address of Hirohito announcing that Japan had surrendered. In his address, the Showa Emperor described the Americans as having used a "most unusual and cruel bomb" that had just destroyed the cities of Hiroshima and Nagasaki; this was the first time that Puyi heard of the atomic bombings of Hiroshima and Nagasaki, which the Japanese had not seen fit to tell him about until then.

The next day, Puyi abdicated as Emperor of Manchukuo and declared in his last decree that Manchukuo was once again part of China. Puyi's party split up in a panic, with former Manchukuo Premier Zhang Jinghui going back to Changchun. Puyi planned to take a plane to escape from Tonghua, taking with him his brother Pujie, his servant Big Li, Yoshioka, and his doctor while leaving Wanrong, his concubine Li Yuqin, Lady Hiro Saga, and Lady Saga's two children behind. The decision to leave behind the women and children was in part made by Yoshioka, who thought the women were in no such danger, and vetoed Puyi's attempts to take them on the plane to Japan.

Puyi asked for Lady Saga to take care of Wanrong, and he gave Lady Saga precious antiques and cash to pay for their way south to Korea. On 17 August, Puyi took a small plane to Mukden, where another larger plane was supposed to arrive to take them to Japan, but instead a Soviet Air Force plane landed. Puyi and his party were all promptly taken prisoner by the Red Army, who initially did not know who Puyi was. The opium-addled Wanrong together with Lady Saga and Li were captured by Chinese communist guerrillas on their way to Korea, after one of Puyi's brothers-in-law informed the communists who the women were. Wanrong, the former empress, was put on display in a local jail and people came from miles around to watch her. In a delirious state of mind, she demanded more opium, asked for imaginary servants to bring her clothing, food, and a bath, hallucinated that she was back in the Forbidden City or the Salt Tax Palace. The general hatred for Puyi meant that none had any sympathy for Wanrong, who was seen as another Japanese collaborator, and a guard told Lady Saga that "this one won't last", making it a waste of time feeding her. In June 1946, Wanrong starved to death in her jail cell. In his 1964 book From Emperor to Citizen, Puyi merely stated that he learned in 1951 that Wanrong "died a long time ago" without mentioning how she died.

== Later life (1945–1967) ==
=== Imprisonment in the Soviet Union and trial in Tokyo ===
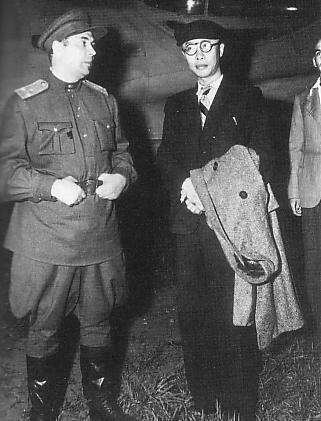
Puyi (right) and a Soviet military officer

The Soviets took Puyi to the Siberian town of Chita. He lived in a sanatorium, then later in Khabarovsk near the Chinese border, where he was treated well and allowed to keep some of his servants. As a prisoner, Puyi spent his days praying and expected the prisoners to treat him as an emperor and slapped the faces of his servants when they displeased him.

He learned about the outcome of the civil war in China by listening to Chinese-language broadcasts on Radio Moscow, but he did not seem to care. The Soviet government refused the Republic of China's repeated requests to extradite Puyi; the Kuomintang government had indicted him on charges of high treason, and the Soviet refusal to extradite him almost certainly saved his life, as Chiang Kai-shek had often spoken of his desire to have Puyi shot. The Kuomintang captured Puyi's cousin Dongzhen, who was publicly executed in Beijing in 1948 for high treason. Not wishing to return to China, Puyi wrote to Stalin several times asking for asylum in the Soviet Union, and that he be given one of the former tsarist palaces to live out his days.

In 1946, Puyi testified at the International Military Tribunal for the Far East in Tokyo, detailing his resentment at how he had been treated by the Japanese. At the Tokyo trial, he had a long exchange with defence counsel Major Ben Bruce Blakeney about whether he had been kidnapped in 1931, in which Puyi perjured himself by saying that the statements in Johnston's 1934 book Twilight in the Forbidden City about how he had willingly become Emperor of Manchukuo were all lies. When Blakeney mentioned that the introduction to the book described how Puyi had told Johnston that he had willingly gone to Manchuria in 1931, Puyi denied being in contact with Johnston in 1931, and that Johnston made things up for "commercial advantage".

Puyi had a strong interest in minimising his own role in history, because any admission of active control would have led to his execution. The Australian judge Sir William Webb, the President of the Tribunal, was often frustrated with Puyi's testimony, and chided him numerous times. Behr described Puyi on the stand as a "consistent, self-assured liar, prepared to go to any lengths to save his skin", and as a combative witness more than able to hold his own against the defence lawyers. Since no one at the trial but Blakeney had actually read Twilight in the Forbidden City or the interviews Woodhead had conducted with him in 1932, Puyi had room to distort what had been written about him or said by him. Puyi greatly respected Johnston, who was a surrogate father to him, and felt guilty about portraying him as a dishonest man.

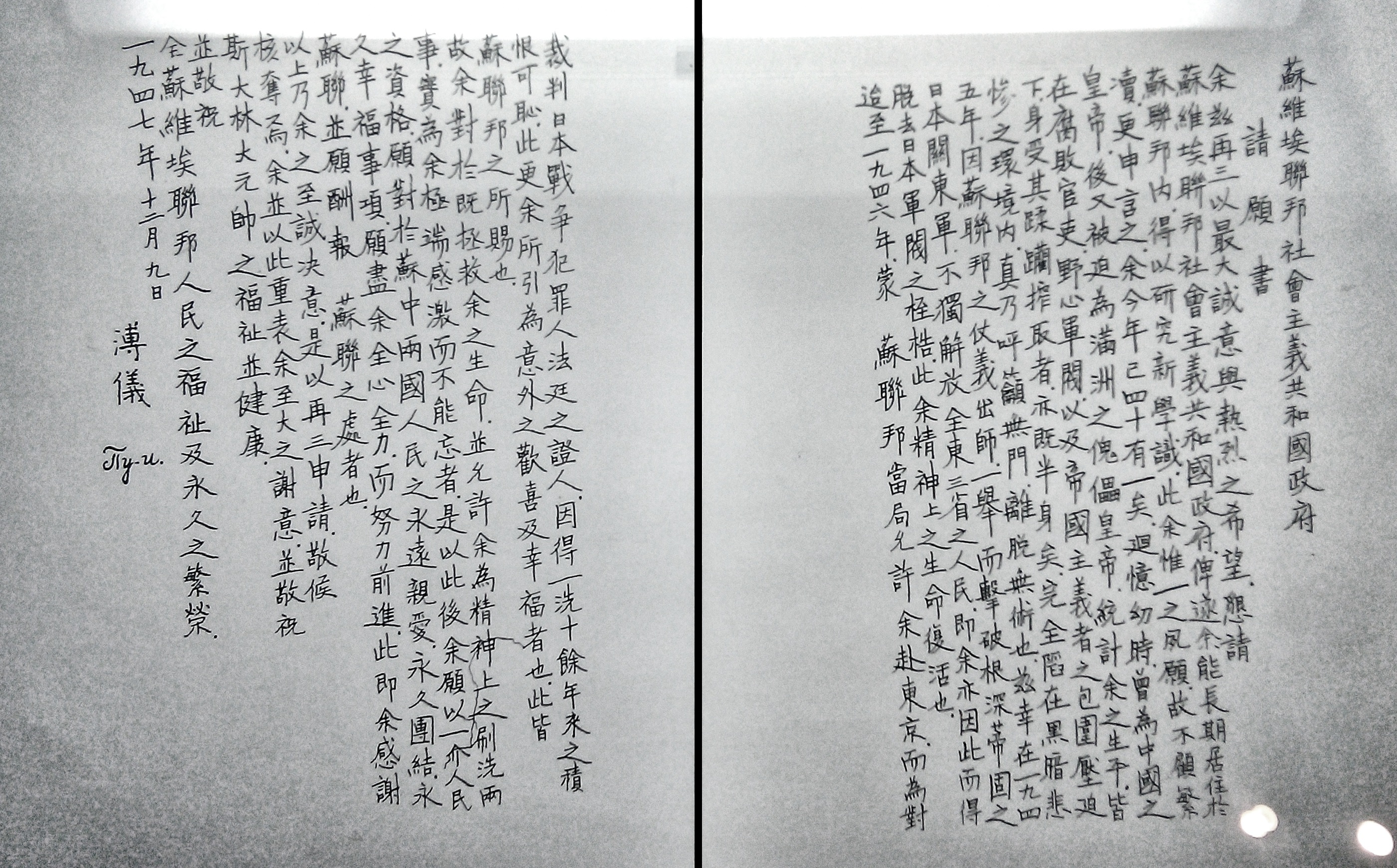
Puyi's letters to Joseph Stalin

After his return to the Soviet Union, Puyi was held at Detention Center No. 45, where his servants continued to make his bed, dress him and do other work for him. Puyi did not speak Russian and had limited contacts with his Soviet guards, using a few Manchukuo prisoners as translators. One prisoner told Puyi that the Soviets would keep him in Siberia forever because "this is the part of the world you come from". The Soviets had promised the Chinese communists that they would hand over the high value prisoners when the CCP won the civil war, and wanted to keep Puyi alive. Puyi's brother-in-law Runqi and some of his servants were not considered high value, and were sent to work at a Siberian rehabilitation camp.

=== In the People's Republic of China ===
==== Continued imprisonment ====
After the Chinese Communist Party won the Chinese Civil War and came to power in 1949, Puyi was repatriated to China after the completion of negotiations between the Soviet Union and China. Puyi was of considerable value to Mao, as Behr noted: "In the eyes of Mao and other Chinese communist leaders, Pu Yi, the last Emperor, was the epitome of all that had been evil in old Chinese society. If he could be shown to have undergone sincere, permanent change, what hope was there for the most diehard counter-revolutionary? The more overwhelming the guilt, the more spectacular the redemption-and the greater glory of the Chinese Communist Party." Puyi would be subjected to "remodelling" to make him into a communist.

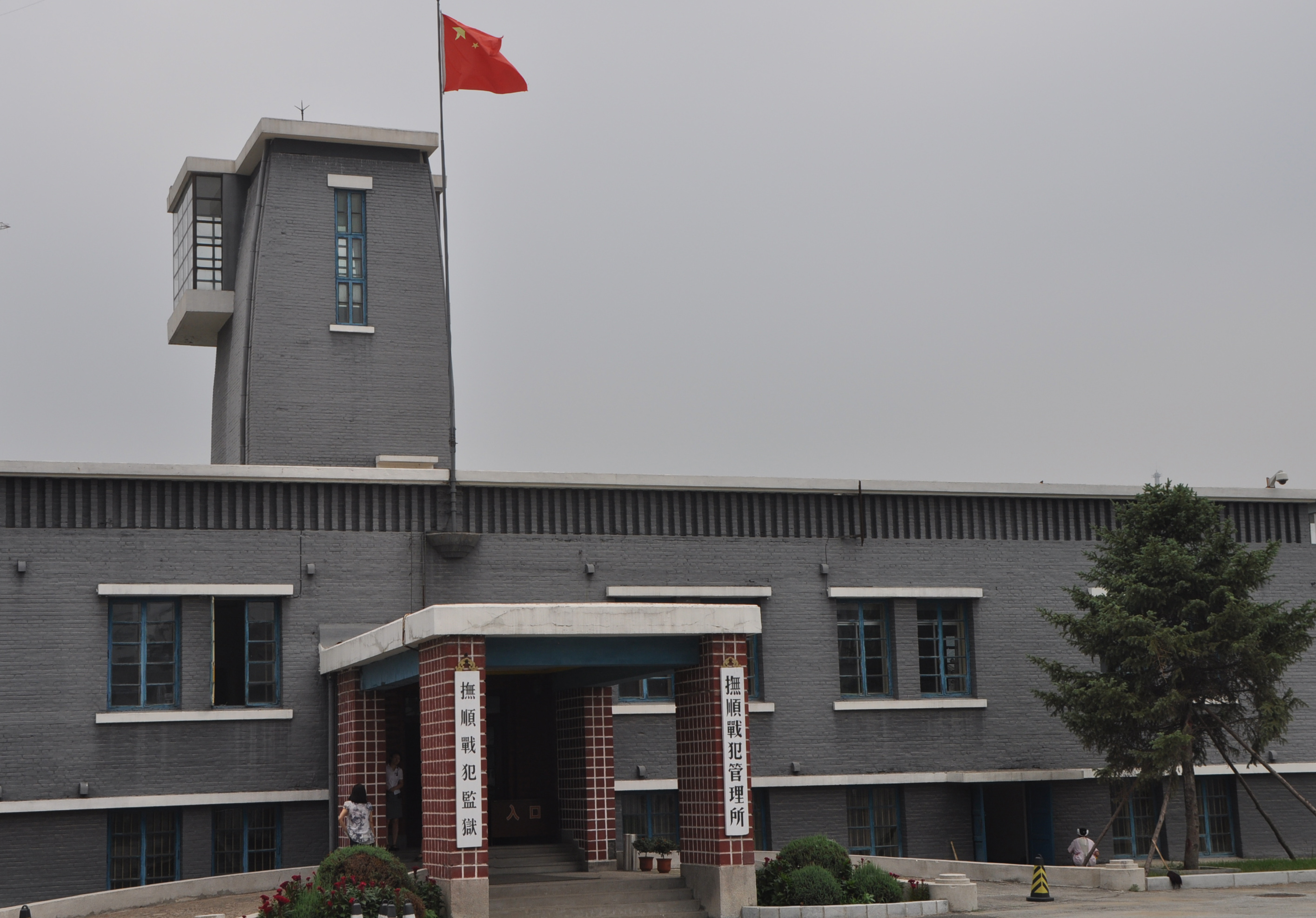
Fushun War Criminals Prison

Puyi testifying during the 1950s

In 1950, the Soviets loaded Puyi and the rest of the Manchukuo and Japanese prisoners onto a train that took them to China with Puyi convinced that he would be executed when he arrived. Puyi was surprised by the kindness of his Chinese guards, who told him that his arrival in China was the beginning of a new life for him. In an attempt to ingratiate himself with the guards and for the first time in his life, Puyi addressed commoners with the formal word for "you" (您; nín) instead of the informal word for "you" (你; nǐ).

Except for a period of time during the Korean War, when he was moved to Harbin, Puyi spent nine years in the Fushun War Criminals Management Centre in Liaoning until he was declared reformed. The prisoners at Fushun were senior Japanese, Manchukuo and Kuomintang officials and officers. Puyi was the weakest and the most hapless of the prisoners, and he was frequently bullied by the others, who liked to humiliate the former emperor; he might not have survived his imprisonment if the warden Jin Yuan had not gone out of his way to protect him. Before his imprisonment, Puyi had never brushed his teeth nor had he ever tied his own shoelaces, basic tasks which he had to perform in prison, subjecting him to the ridicule of other prisoners. In 1951 and for the first time, Puyi learned that Wanrong had died in 1946.

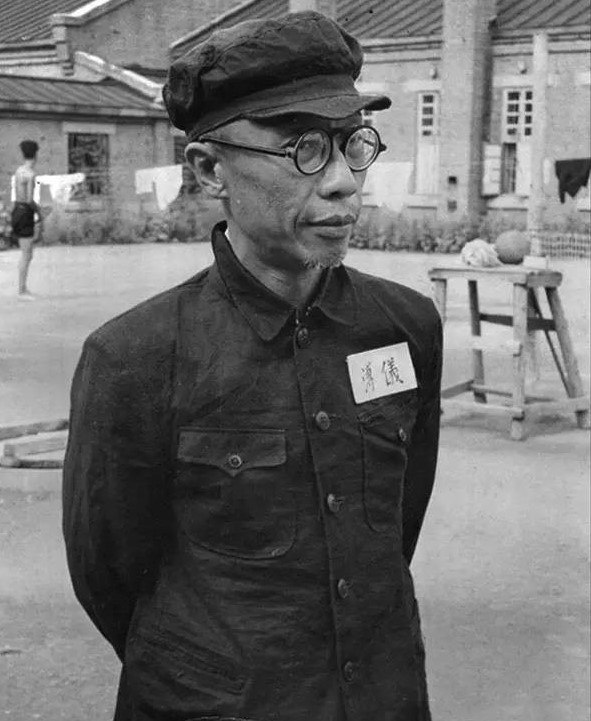
Puyi as a prisoner in Fushun

Much of Puyi's "remodelling" consisted of joining "Marxism–Leninism and Mao Zedong Thought discussion groups" and participating in meetings in which the prisoners would have discussions about what their lives were like before they were imprisoned. When Puyi protested by telling Jin that it had been impossible for him to resist Japan because there was nothing which he could have done, Jin confronted him by arranging meetings between him and people who had joined the resistance, fought against Japan and had been tortured, and he also asked Puyi why ordinary people who lived in Manchukuo resisted the Japanese occupation while an emperor did nothing. Puyi had to attend lectures in which a former Japanese civil servant spoke about the exploitation of Manchukuo while a former officer in the Kempeitai talked about how he rounded up people for slave labour and ordered mass executions.

At one point, Puyi was taken to Harbin and Pingfang to see where the infamous Unit 731, the chemical and biological warfare unit of the Imperial Japanese Army, had conducted gruesome experiments on people. Puyi noted in shame and horror: "All the atrocities had been carried out in my name". Puyi by the mid-1950s was overwhelmed with guilt and often told Jin that he felt utterly worthless to the point that he considered committing suicide. Jin told Puyi to express his guilt in writing. Puyi later recalled he felt "that I was up against an irresistible force that would not rest until it found out everything".

Sometimes, Puyi was taken out for tours of the countryside of Manchuria. On one tour, he met a farmer's wife whose family had been evicted to make way for Japanese settlers and had almost starved to death while her husband was working as a slave in one of Manchukuo's factories. When Puyi asked for her forgiveness, she told him "It's all over now, let's not talk about it", causing him to burst into tears. During another meeting, a woman described the mass execution of people from her village by the Japanese Army, and then, she stated that she did not hate the Japanese nor did she hate those who had served them because she retained her faith in humanity, which greatly moved Puyi. On another occasion, Jin confronted Puyi by arranging meetings between him and his former concubine Li in his office, where she attacked Puyi for only seeing her as a sex object, and she said that she was now pregnant by a man who loved her.

In late 1956, Puyi acted in a play, The Defeat of the Aggressors, about the Suez Crisis, playing the role of a left-wing Labour MP who challenges a former Manchukuo minister playing the Foreign Secretary Selwyn Lloyd in the House of Commons. Puyi enjoyed the role and continued acting in plays about his life and Manchukuo; in one he played a Manchukuo functionary and kowtowed to a portrait of himself as Emperor of Manchukuo. During the Great Leap Forward, when millions of people starved to death in China, Jin chose to cancel Puyi's visits to the countryside lest the scenes of famine undo his growing faith in communism. Behr wrote that many are surprised that Puyi's "remodelling" worked, with an Emperor brought up as almost a god becoming content to be just an ordinary man, but he noted that "... it is essential to remember that Puyi was not alone in undergoing such successful 'remolding'. Tough KMT generals, and even tougher Japanese generals ... became, in Fushun, just as devout in their support of communist ideals as Puyi".

==== Release ====
Puyi came to Beijing on 9 December 1959 with special permission from Mao and lived for the next six months in an ordinary Beijing residence with his sister before being transferred to a government-sponsored hotel. He had the job of sweeping the streets, and got lost on his first day of work, which led him to tell astonished passers-by: "I'm Puyi, the last Emperor of the Qing dynasty. I'm staying with relatives and can't find my way home". One of Puyi's first acts upon returning to Beijing was to visit the Forbidden City as a tourist; he pointed out to other tourists that many of the exhibits were the things he had used in his youth. He voiced his support for the communists and worked as a gardener at the Beijing Botanical Gardens. The role brought Puyi a degree of happiness he had never known as an emperor, though he was notably clumsy.

Behr noted that in Europe, people who played roles analogous to the role Puyi played in Manchukuo were generally executed; for example, the British hanged William Joyce for being the announcer on the English-language broadcasts of Radio Berlin, the Italians shot Benito Mussolini, and the French executed Pierre Laval, so many Westerners are surprised that Puyi was released from prison after only nine years to start a new life. Behr wrote that the communist ideology explained this difference, writing: "In a society where all landlord and 'capitalist-roaders' were evil incarnate, it did not matter so much that Puyi was also a traitor to his country: he was, in the eyes of the communist ideologues, only behaving true to type. If all capitalists and landlords were, by their very nature, traitors, it was only logical that Puyi, the biggest landlord, should also be the biggest traitor. And, in the last resort, Puyi was far more valuable alive than dead".

In early 1960, Puyi met Premier Zhou Enlai, who told him: "You weren't responsible for becoming Emperor at the age of three or the 1917 attempted restoration coup. But you were fully to blame for what happened later. You knew perfectly well what you were doing when you took refuge in the Legation Quarter, when you travelled under Japanese protection to Tianjin, and when you agreed to become Manchukuo Chief Executive." Puyi responded by merely saying that though he did not choose to be an emperor, he had behaved with savage cruelty as boy-emperor and wished he could apologise to all the eunuchs he had flogged during his youth.

At the age of 56, he married Li Shuxian, a hospital nurse, on 30 April 1962, in a ceremony held at the Banquet Hall of the Consultative Conference. From 1964 until his death, he worked as an editor for the literary department of the Chinese People's Political Consultative Conference, where his monthly salary was around 100 yuan. Li recalled in a 1995 interview that: "I found Puyi an honest man, a man who desperately needed my love and was ready to give me as much love as he could. When I was having even a slight case of flu, he was so worried I would die, that he refused to sleep at night and sat by my bedside until dawn so he could attend to my needs". Li also noted, like everybody else who knew him, that Puyi was an incredibly clumsy man, leading her to say: "Once in a boiling rage at his clumsiness, I threatened to divorce him. On hearing this, he got down on his knees and, with tears in his eyes, he begged me to forgive him. I shall never forget what he said to me: 'I have nothing in this world except you, and you are my life. If you go, I will die'. But apart from him, what did I ever have in the world?". Puyi showed remorse for his past actions, often telling her that "[y]esterday's Puyi is the enemy of today's Puyi".

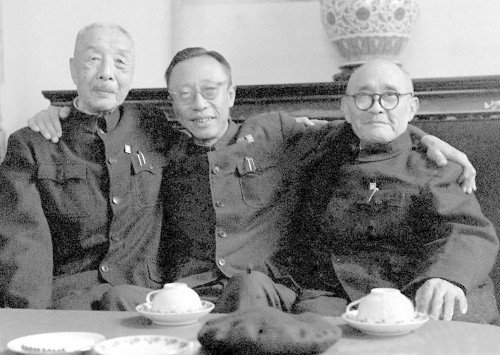
Puyi in 1961, flanked by two former military rivals: Xiong Bingkun, a commander in the Wuchang Uprising, and Lu Zhonglin, who took part in Puyi's expulsion from the Forbidden City in 1924

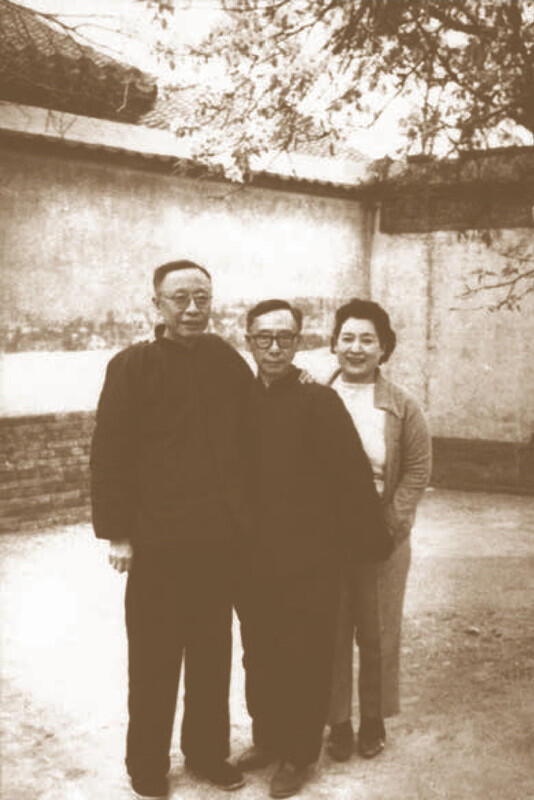
In the spring of 1967 Pujie and Hiro Saga visited Puyi, who was by then seriously ill.

In the 1960s, at the suggestion of Mao Zedong and Zhou Enlai and amid the Chinese government’s efforts to present him as a model of ideological reformation, Puyi published his autobiography From Emperor to Citizen (我的前半生; Wǒdè Qián Bànshēng; Wo Te Ch'ien Pan-Sheng; 'The First Half of My Life'), ghostwritten by Li Wenda, an editor at the People's Publishing Bureau, and polished by Lao She. Li had initially planned to use Puyi's "autocritique" written in Fushun as the basis of the book, expecting the job to take only a few months, but it used such wooden language as Puyi confessed to a career of abject cowardice, that Li was forced to start anew. It took four years to write the book. Puyi said of his testimony at the Tokyo War Crimes Tribunal:

I now feel very ashamed of my testimony, as I withheld some of what I knew to protect myself from being punished by my country. I said nothing about my secret collaboration with the Japanese imperialists over a long period, an association to which my open capitulation after 18 September 1931 was but the conclusion. Instead, I spoke only of the way the Japanese had put pressure on me and forced me to do their will. I maintained that I had not betrayed my country but had been kidnapped; denied all my collaboration with the Japanese; and even claimed that the letter I had written to Jirō Minami was a fake. I covered up my crimes to protect myself.

Puyi objected to Pujie's attempt to reunite with Lady Saga, who had returned to Japan, writing to Zhou asking him to block Lady Saga from coming back to China, which led Zhou to reply: "The war's over, you know. You don't have to carry this national hatred into your own family." Behr concluded: "It is difficult to avoid the impression that Puyi, in an effort to prove himself a 'remolded man', displayed the same craven attitude towards the power-holders of the new China that he had shown in Manchukuo towards the Japanese."

Many of the claims in From Emperor to Citizen, like the statement that it was the Kuomintang who stripped Manchuria bare of industrial equipment in 1945–46 rather than the Soviets, together with an "unreservedly rosy picture of prison life", are widely known to be false, but the book was translated into foreign languages and sold well. Behr wrote: "The more fulsome, cliché-ridden chapters in From Emperor to Citizen, dealing with Puyi's prison experiences, and written at the height of the Mao personality cult, give the impression of well-learned, regurgitated lessons."

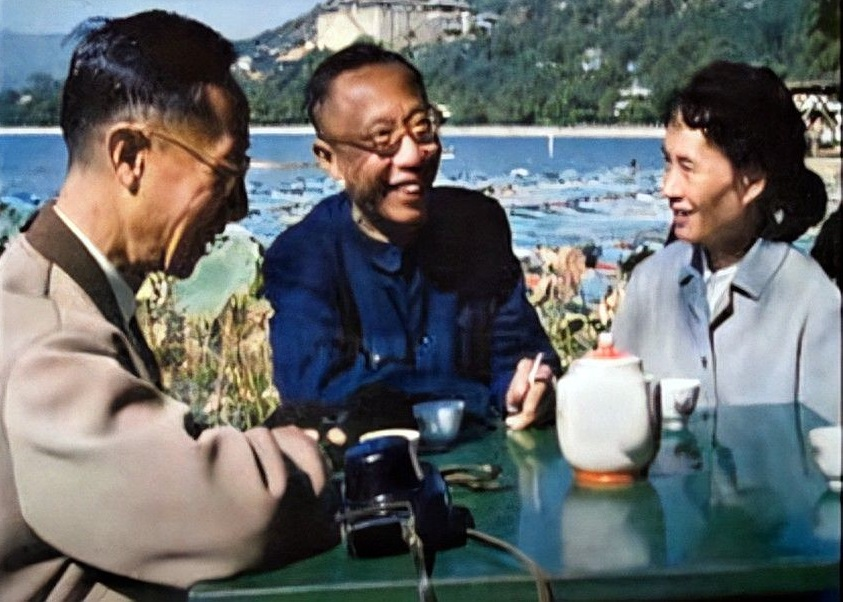
Puyi in the 1960s with Li Shuxian and Pujie at the Summer Palace in Beijing

From 1963 onward, Puyi regularly gave press conferences praising life in the People's Republic of China, and foreign diplomats often sought him out, curious to meet the famous "last emperor" of China. In an interview with Behr, Li Wenda told him that Puyi was a very clumsy man who "invariably forgot to close doors behind him, forgot to flush the toilet, forgot to turn the tap off after washing his hands, had a genius for creating an instant, disorderly mess around him". Puyi had been so used to having his needs catered to that he never entirely learned how to function on his own.

He tried very hard to be modest and humble, always being the last person to board a bus, which meant that on one occasion he missed the ride, mistaking the bus conductor for a passenger. In restaurants he would tell waitresses, "You should not be serving me. I should be serving you." During this period, Puyi was known for his kindness, and once after he accidentally knocked down an elderly lady with his bicycle, he visited her every day in the hospital to bring her flowers to make amends until she was released.

== Death ==
The Cultural Revolution broke out in 1966, and the Red Guards saw Puyi, who symbolized imperial China, as an easy target. Puyi was placed under protection by the local public security bureau and although his food rations, his salary, and various luxuries were removed, he was not publicly humiliated as was common at the time. The Red Guards attacked Puyi because his book From Emperor to Citizen had been translated into English and French and they burned copies of it in the streets. The homes of various members of the Qing family, including Pujie's home, were raided and burned by Red Guards, but Premier Zhou Enlai used his influence to protect Puyi and his family from the worst abuses which were inflicted by the Red Guards. Jin Yuan, the man who had "remodelled" Puyi in the 1950s, fell victim to the Red Guards and was imprisoned in Fushun for several years, while Li Wenda, who had ghostwritten From Emperor to Citizen, spent seven years in solitary confinement. Puyi's health began to decline in 1964 and he died of complications which arose from kidney cancer and heart disease in Beijing on 17 October 1967 at the age of 61.

In accordance with the PRC's law, Puyi's body was cremated and his ashes were initially interred at the Babaoshan People's Cemetery following a family discussion. His seventh uncle, Zaitao, noted that with the Cultural Revolution at its height, seeking placement in the Revolutionary Cemetery would cause unnecessary trouble for Zhou Enlai. On 29 May 1980, the Chinese government held a memorial service for Puyi and two others, after which his ashes were moved to the Babaoshan Revolutionary Cemetery, where they rested alongside the remains of other party members and state dignitaries. The Revolutionary Cemetery was the burial ground of imperial concubines and eunuchs prior to the establishment of the People's Republic of China. In 1995, Puyi's widow Li Shuxian transferred his ashes to the Hualong Imperial Cemetery (华龙皇家陵园). The cemetery is near the Western Qing Tombs, 120 km (75 mi) southwest of Beijing, where four of the nine Qing emperors preceding him are interred, along with three empresses and 69 princes, princesses, and imperial concubines. In 2015, some descendants of the Aisin-Gioro clan bestowed posthumous names upon Puyi and his wives. Wenxiu and Li Yuqin were not given posthumous names because their imperial status was removed upon divorce.

== Titles, honours, and decorations ==
=== Titles ===
Styles of Xuantong Emperor
- Reference style: His Imperial Majesty
- Spoken style: Your Imperial Majesty
- Alternative style: Son of Heaven (天子)

When he ruled as Emperor of the Qing dynasty (and therefore emperor of China) from 1908 to 1912 and during his brief restoration in 1917, Puyi's era name was "Xuantong", so he was known as the "Xuantong Emperor" (宣统皇帝; 宣統皇帝; Xuāntǒng Huángdì) during those two periods. Puyi was also allowed to retain his title as Emperor of the Great Qing, being treated like a foreign monarch by the Republic of China until 5 November 1924.

As Puyi was also the last ruling emperor of China, he is widely known as "the last emperor" (末代皇帝; Mòdài Huángdì) in China and throughout the rest of the world. Some refer to him as "the last emperor of the Qing dynasty" (清末帝; Qīng Mò Dì).

Due to his abdication, Puyi is also known as the "yielded emperor" (遜帝; Xùn Dì) or "abrogated emperor" (废帝; 廢帝; Fèi Dì). Sometimes, the character "Qing" (清) is added in front of the two titles to indicate his affiliation with the Qing dynasty.

When Puyi ruled the puppet state of Manchukuo and assumed the title of Chief Executive of the new state, his era name was "Datong". As Emperor of Manchukuo from 1934 to 1945, his era name was "Kangde", so he was known as the "Kangde Emperor" (康德皇帝; Kāngdé Huángdì, Japanese: Kōtoku Kōtei) during that period of time.

=== Qing ===
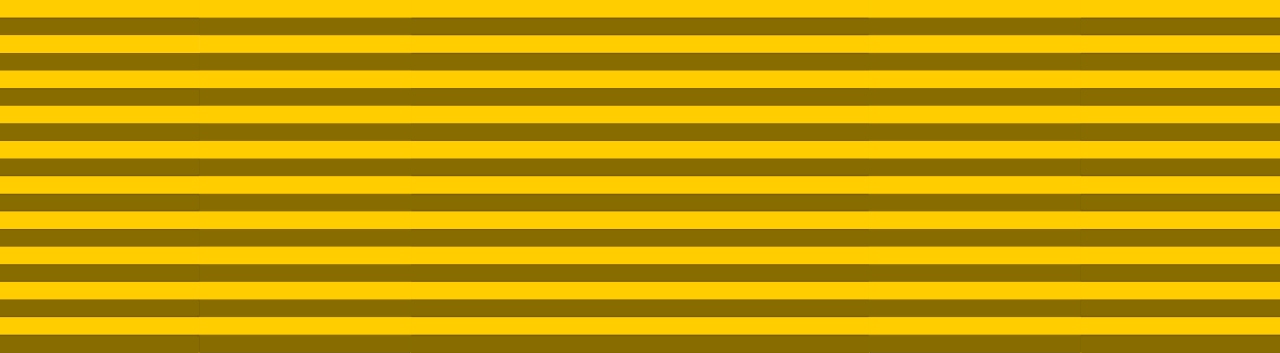
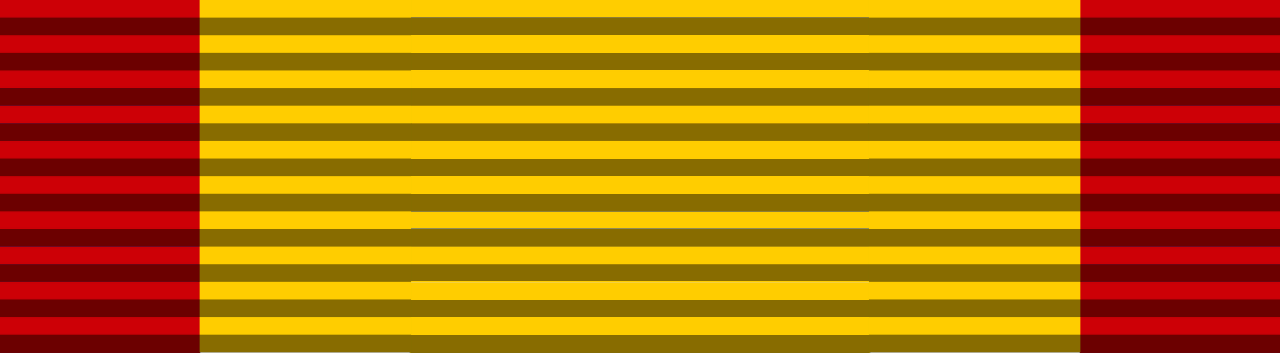
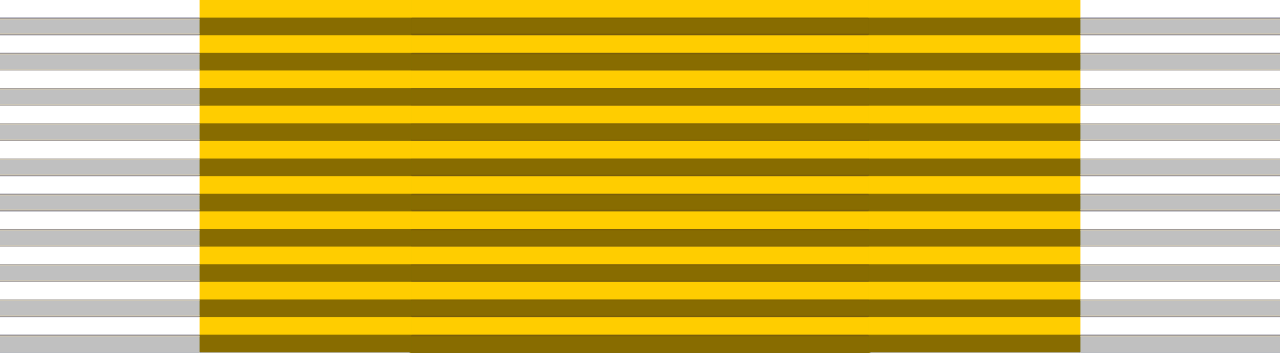
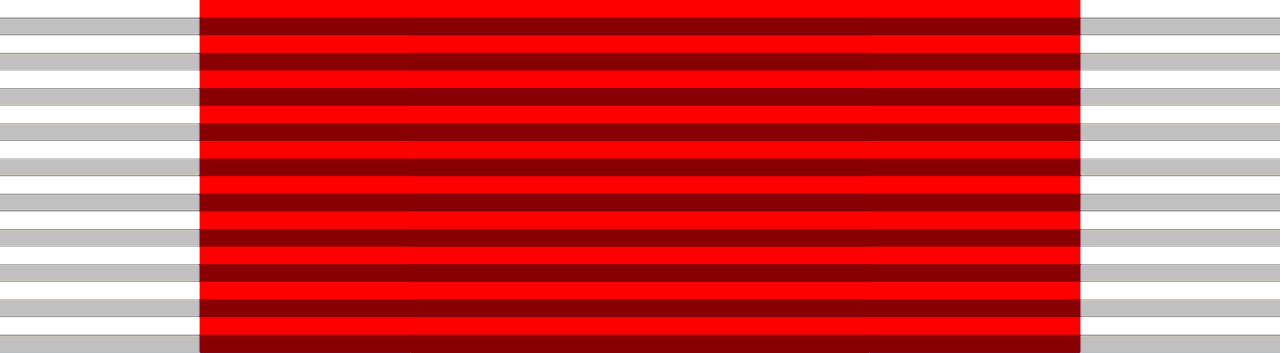
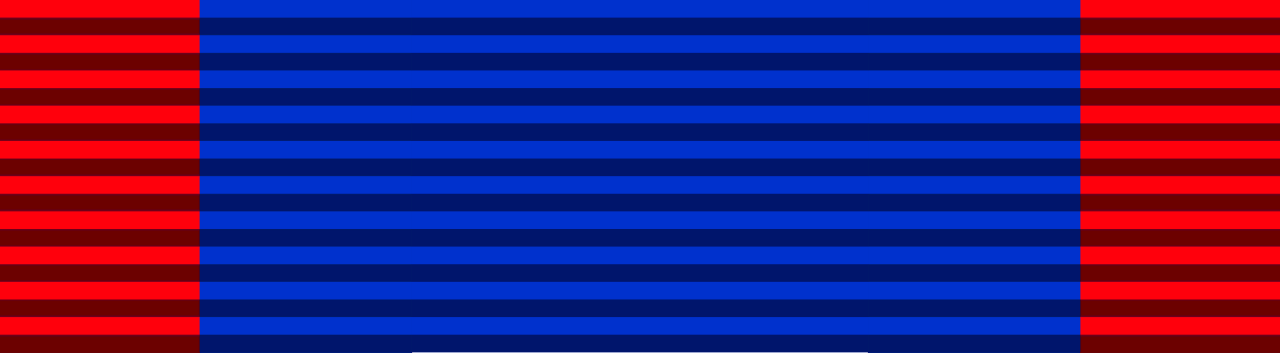
Order of the Peacock Feather
Order of the Blue Feather
Order of the Double Dragon
Order of the Imperial Throne
Order of the Yellow Dragon
Order of the Red Dragon
Order of the Blue Dragon
Order of the Black Dragon

=== Manchukuo ===
Grand Order of the Orchid Blossom
Order of the Illustrious Dragon
Order of the Auspicious Clouds
Order of the Pillars of State

=== Foreign ===
Supreme Order of the Most Holy Annunciation (Italy)
Order of Saints Maurice and Lazarus (Italy)
Knight Grand Cross of the Order of the Crown of Italy (Italy)
Grand Cordon of the Order of the Chrysanthemum (Japan)
Grand Cordon of the Order of the Rising Sun with Paulownia Flowers (Japan)

== See also ==
- Chinese emperors family tree (late)
- Dynasties in Chinese history
- List of heads of regimes who were later imprisoned
- List of monarchs who lost their thrones in the 20th century
- The Last Emperor

== Notes ==
Puyi House of Aisin-Gioro Born: 7 February 1906 Died: 17 October 1967
Regnal titles
Preceded by Guangxu Emperor	Emperor of China; Emperor of the Qing dynasty 2 December 1908 – 12 February 1912	Position abolished Qing dynasty was ended in 1912
New title Manchukuo was created in 1932	Chief Executive of Manchukuo; 9 March 1932 – 1 March 1934	Position abolished Manchukuo became an empire in 1934
New title Manchukuo became an empire in 1934	Emperor of Manchukuo; 1 March 1934 – 17 August 1945	Position abolished Manchukuo was ended in 1945
Preceded by Guangxu Emperor	Head of the House of Aisin-Gioro; 2 December 1908 – 17 October 1967	Succeeded by Prince Pujie
