= Shichahai Subdistrict =

Shichahai Subdistrict 什刹海街道
- Subdistrict
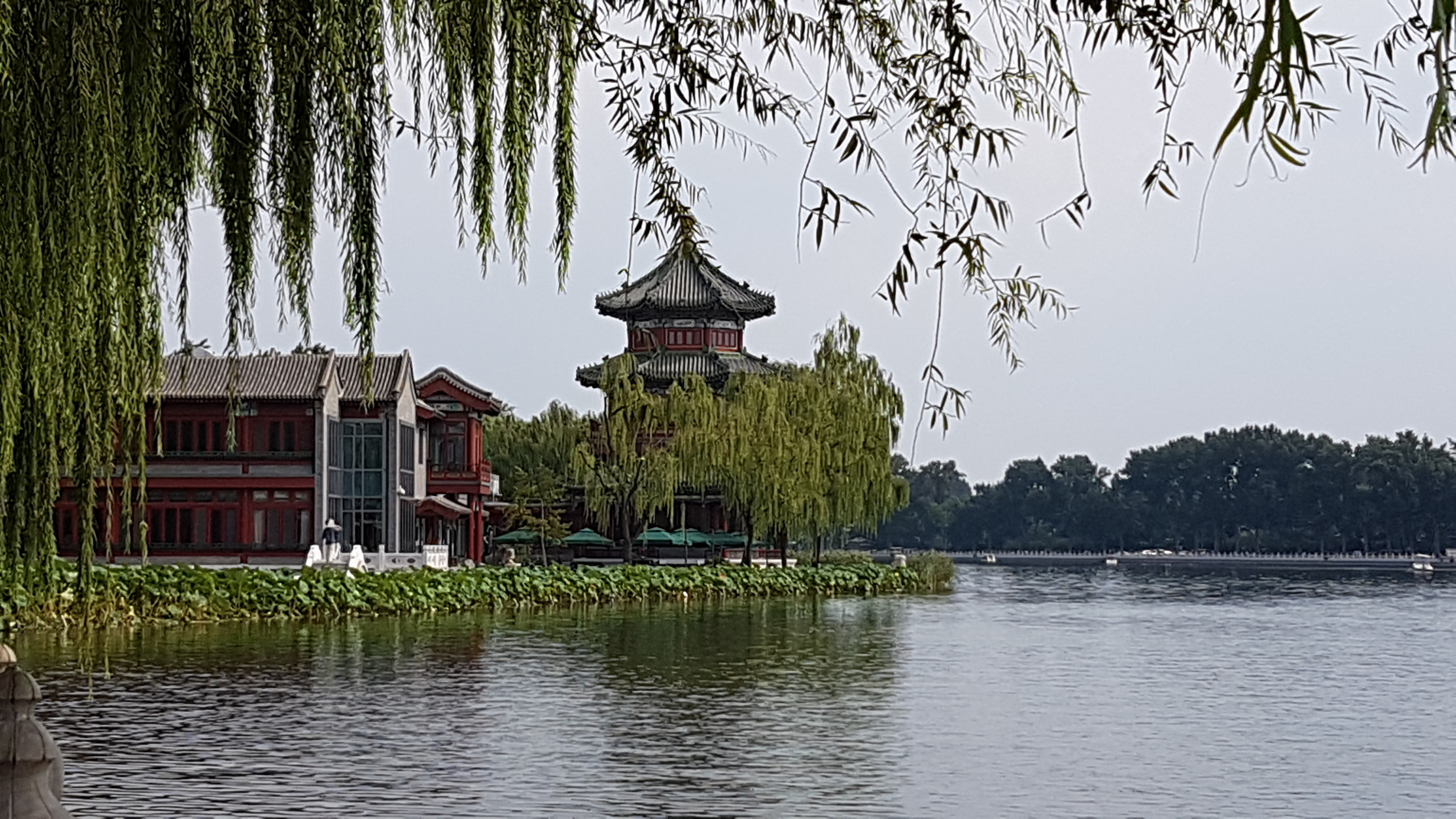
- Shichahai Lake within the subdistrict, 2016

- Location within Beijing Location within China
- Coordinates: 39°55′57″N 116°22′27″E
- Country: China
- Municipality: Beijing
- District: Xicheng

Area
  - Total: 5.8 km^{2} (2.2 sq mi)

Population (2020)
  - Total: 75,447
  - Density: 13,000/km^{2} (34,000/sq mi)
- Time zone: UTC+8 (China Standard)
- Postal code: 100032
- Area code: 010

Shichahai Subdistrict (Chinese: 什刹海街道; pinyin: Shíchàhǎi Jiēdào) is a subdistrict on the northern portion of Xicheng District, Beijing, China. As of 2020, its total population was 75,447.

The subdistrict was named after Shichahai (Chinese: 什刹海; lit. 'Ten moment sea'), a collection of three lakes within the subdistrict.

== History ==
Timetable of changes in the status of Shichahai Subdistrict
Time	Status
Qing dynasty	Part of the Zhenghuang, Zhenghong Banners and Huangcheng Area
1928	Part of 4th, 5th and 6th Inner Districts
1950	Part of 4th and 5th Districts
1952	Part of Xisi District
1958	Liguangqiao and Maijiawan Subdistricts were merged to form Changqiao Subdistrict. Transferred under Xicheng District
2004	Land east of Xinjiekoubei Avenue within Xinjiekou Subdistrict was merged with Changqiao Subdistrict to create Shichahai Subdistrict

== Administrative Division ==
By 2021, there are a total of 22 communities within the subdistrict:

Administrative Division Code	Community Name in English	Community Name in Chinese
110102012001	Xisibei	西四北
110102012004	Xishiku	西什库
110102012005	Aiminjie	爱民街
110102012006	Dahongluo	大红罗
110102012007	Xigang	西巷
110102012008	Huguosi	护国寺
110102012011	Qiantie	前铁
110102012012	Liuyinjie	柳荫街
110102012014	Xinghua	兴华
110102012015	Songshujie	松树街
110102012018	Baimi	白米
110102012019	Jingshan	景山
110102012020	Miliangku	米粮库
110102012022	Jiugulou	旧鼓楼
110102012023	Shuangsi	双寺
110102012024	Guxi	鼓西
110102012026	Houhai	后海
110102012029	Weikeng	苇坑
110102012031	Houhai Xiyan	后海西沿
110102012032	Xihai	西海
110102012033	Sihuan	四环
110102012035	Qianhai	前海

== Landmarks ==
- Shichahai
- Beihai Park
- Former Residence of Soong Ching-ling
- Prince Gong's Mansion
- Guo Moruo Residence
- Huode Zhenjun Temple
- Church of the Saviour
