= Yunhe (princess) =

Chinese princess (1911–2002)

Aisin Gioro Yunhe
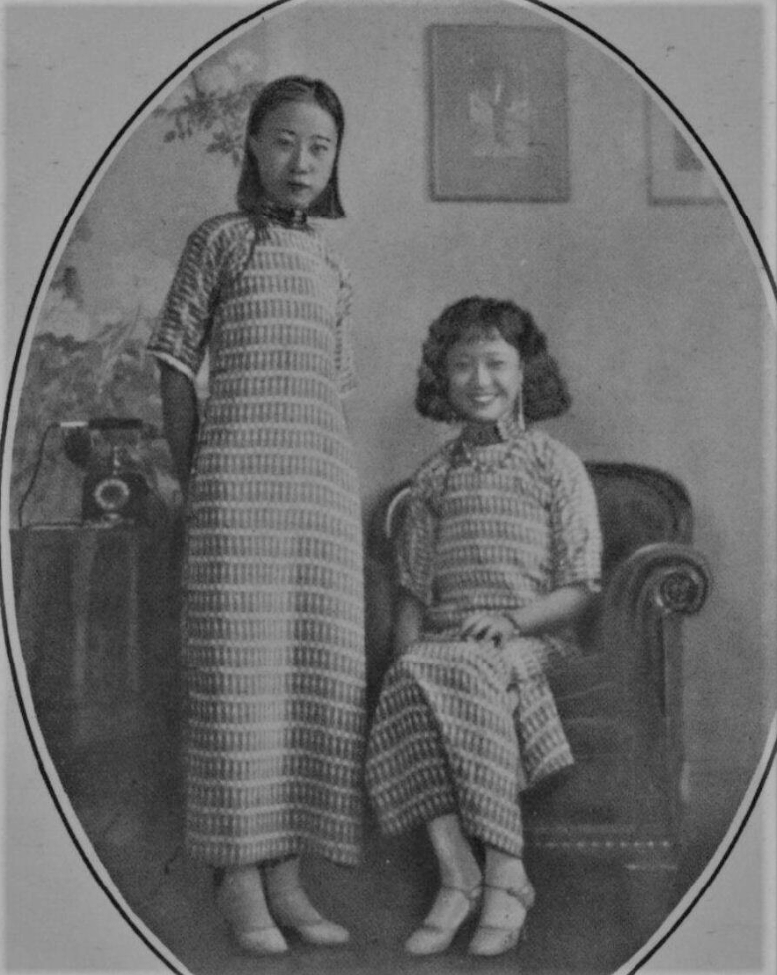
- Jin Yunying (seated) with her sister Jin Yunhe (standing)
- Born: Aisin Gioro Yunhe; 24 November 1911; Prince Chun's Mansion, Peking, Qing China
- Died: 16 February 2002 (aged 90); People's Republic of China
- Spouse: Zheng Guangyuan
Names
- Jin Yunhe
- House: Aisin Gioro (by birth)
- Father: Zaifeng, Prince Chun of the First Rank
- Mother: Youlan

Yunhe (Chinese: 韞龢; 24 November 1911 – 16 February 2002), better known as Jin Xinru (Chinese: 金欣如), was a Chinese princess of the Qing dynasty.

== Life ==
=== Early life ===
Yunhe was born in the Manchu Aisin Gioro clan in 1911 as the second daughter of Prince Chun and Princess Consort Youlan. She was also a full sister of Puyi (the Xuantong Emperor) the last Emperor of China. She had three other full siblings (one brother and two sisters) and six half siblings (two brothers and four sisters).

She was referred to as "Second Princess" in her childhood. In November 1924, the warlord Feng Yuxiang took control of Beijing and forced the former imperialy family out of the Forbidden City. They moved to Tianjin's Heping District. In Tianjin, Yunhe and her siblings learned the Japanese language and played tennis.

=== Life in Manchuria ===
In 1931, Puyi was installed as emperor of Manchukuo, a puppet state established by the Empire of Japan in northeastern China. On 9 March 1932, Yunhe attended the inauguration ceremony of Puyi as ruler of Manchukuo.

In 1931, Yunhe was engaged to Guangyuan, grandson of Zheng Xiaoxu. Yunhe and Guangyuan were married in Xinjing (present-day Changchun, Jilin), the capital of Manchukuo, on 18 April 1932. The couple had three daughters and one son.

After the wedding, she accompanied her husband on his studies in Britain, where they lived until 1934. Upon their return to Manchukuo in May 1934, the settled in the Western Garden in the Imperial Palace in Changchun. She accompanied her husband during his studies in Japan in 1937-1938. It is noted that Yunhe instructed her future sister-in-law Li Yuqin in court etiquette, when Li Yuqin was appointed Imperial concubine in 1943.

=== Later life ===
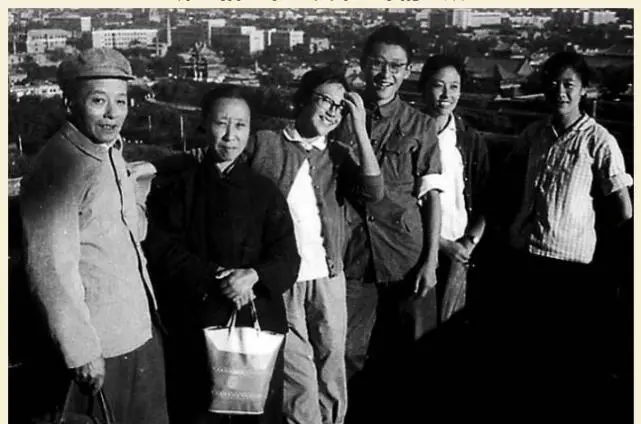
Yunhe with her family

At the end of the Second Sino-Japanese War in 1945, Soviet forces invaded and occupied northeastern China. Yunying and her family were evacuated by train from Xinjing to Dalizigou (in present-day Linjiang, Jilin); there, Puyi left his wife, his concubine, his sister-in-law and his nieces, and selected his three full siblings (his brother Pujie and his sisters Yunhe and Yunying), his physician and a servant to accompany him further. They took a plane to Mukden (present-day Shenyang, Liaoning), where Puyi and his brother was arrested by Soviet forces and taken to a prison camp in Siberia. Puyi's sisters were not arrested; they moved with their children to Tonghua, from which they were eventually able to return to Beijing.

Yunhe managed to return to Beijing in 1948. In 1949, Chinese Communist forces occupied Beijing. In 1951, after her father's death, she inherited a part of his properties. Her husband worked as an engineer at the post office, while she managed a daycare and worked at a factory. She retired in 1970. At the end of her life, she worked with a writer to write her autobiography.

Yunhe died in China in 2002.

== Ancestry ==
Jiaqing Emperor (1760–1820)
Daoguang Emperor (1782–1850)
Empress Xiaoshurui (1760–1797)
Yixuan (1840–1891)
Lingshou (1788–1824)
Imperial Noble Consort Zhuangshun (1822–1866)
Lady Weng
Zaifeng (1883–1951)
Deqing
Cuiyan (1866–1925)
Yunhe (1911–2002)
Tasiha
Changshou (d. 1852)
Ronglu (1836–1903)
Lady Uja
Youlan (1884–1921)
Linggui (1815–1885)
Lady Aisin Gioro
Lady Sun

== Sources ==
- Puyi (Swedish): Jag var kejsare av Kina (I was the emperor of China) (1988)
- Life after the Last Emperor
- Chinese Imperial Family
