= Former Residence of Soong Ching-ling =

Former Residence of Soong Ching-ling or Soong Ching-ling Memorial Residence may refer to:

- Former Residence of Soong Ching-ling (Beijing)
- Soong Ching-ling Memorial Residence (Shanghai)
