= Jin Youzhi =

Head of the House of Aisin-Gioro from 1994 to 2015

- Born: 21 September 1918; Shichahai, Beijing, Republic of China
- Died: 10 April 2015 (aged 96); Beijing, China
- Consorts: Jin Yuting (died 1971) Zhang Maoying (m. 1975)
- Issue: Yuzhang; Yukun; Yucheng; Yuquan; Yulan
Names
- Jin Youzhi (金友之)
- House: Aisin-Gioro
- Father: Zaifeng, Prince Chun of the First Rank
- Mother: Lady Denggiya

Jin Youzhi
- Chinese: 金友之
Transcriptions
Standard Mandarin
- Hanyu Pinyin: Jīn Yǒuzhī

Puren
- Chinese: 溥任
Transcriptions
Standard Mandarin
- Hanyu Pinyin: Pǔrén

Jin Youzhi (Chinese: 金友之, 21 September 1918 – 10 April 2015), born Aisin-Gioro Puren, was a Chinese politician, teacher and historian. He was the fourth and youngest son of Prince Chun, and a younger half-brother of Puyi, the last emperor of China. Instead of using his Manchu clan name "Aisin-Gioro" as his family name, Puren adopted "Jin" as his new family name. "Jin" means "gold" in Mandarin, as does "Aisin" in the Manchu language. His courtesy name was "Youzhi." He is best known as "Jin Youzhi." The Chinese media referred to him as "the last emperor's younger brother" or "the last imperial younger brother."

== Life ==
Jin was born in the Prince Chun Mansion in Shichahai, Beijing. After receiving an early education in Chinese classics and traditional art, he established a public primary school in the Prince Chun Mansion in 1947 with support from his father. He was the principal of the school while his sister was a teacher there. The school was later donated to the Chinese government, after which Jin continued working as a teacher until retiring in 1988. In his retirement, Jin wrote books on the history of the Qing dynasty and literature. He served three terms as a delegate to the Municipal Political Consultative Conference of Beijing, and was also a researcher in Chinese history at the Beijing Research Institute.

Jin was the second in line to the Manchu throne after his brother Pujie, under a 1937 succession law issued by Puyi as Emperor of Manchukuo.

== Family ==
- First wife, of the Jin clan (金氏; d. 1971), personal name Yuting (瑜庭)
  - Jin Yuzhang (毓嶂; b. May 1942), first son
    - Married Liu Yumin (劉玉敏), and had issue (one daughter; Jin Xin (金鑫))
  - Jin Yukun (毓琨), first daughter
    - Married Mr. Du (杜), and had issue (one son; Du Jingzhe (杜京哲))
  - Jin Yucheng (毓珵), second daughter
    - Married Mr. Qiao (喬), and had issue (one son; Qiao Xiaodong (喬曉冬))
  - Jin Yuquan (毓峑; b. May 1946), second son
    - Married Cheng Yingying (程迎盈), and had issue (one daughter; Jin Jun (金鈞))
  - Jin Yulan (毓嵐; b. December 1948), third son
    - Married Zhou Qingxue (周清学), and had issue (one daughter; Jin Zhao (金釗))
- Second wife, of the Zhang clan (張氏), personal name Maoying (茂瀅)

== See also ==
- Royal and noble ranks of the Qing dynasty
- Ranks of imperial consorts in China § Qing

Jin Youzhi Qing Dynasty Born: 21 September 1918 Died: 10 April 2015
Titles in pretence
| Preceded by Pujie | — TITULAR — Head of the House of Aisin-Gioro, 1994-2015; Reason for succession failure: Empire abolished in 1945 | Succeeded by Jin Yuzhang |
