= Gūwalgiya =

Manchu clan and family name

Manchu name
- Manchu script: ᡤᡡᠸᠠᠯᡤᡳᠶᠠ

Chinese name
- Traditional Chinese: 瓜爾佳氏
- Simplified Chinese: 瓜尔佳氏
Transcriptions
Standard Mandarin
- Hanyu Pinyin: guā ěr jiā shì

Pronunciation respelling name
- Pronunciation respelling: GO-Wahl-GHEE-Yah

Gūwalgiya was one of the most powerful Manchu clans. It is often listed by historians as the first of the eight prominent Manchu clans of the Qing dynasty. After the demise of the dynasty, some of its descendants sinicized their clan name to the Han Chinese surname Guan (關).

== History ==
=== Origins and Early History ===
The Gūwalgiya clan can be traced back to the Jurchen people in the early 13th century, specifically the Jianzhou Jurchen tribes. The Name "Gūwalgiya" originally had been referred to a geographical location and later on was adopted as a clan name. The clan is believed to have originated from the Yalu River region (present-day Liaoning Province), around the area known as Sā'ěrhǔ (萨尔浒).

During the late 16th century, Gūwalgiya Gāha, the son of Gūwalgiya Sōngāli, became the chieftain of Sā'ěrhǔ (萨尔浒) and allied with Nurhaci, the founder of the Later Jin dynasty. This alliance was an important piece in the establishment of the Later Jin and later the Qing Dynasty. The Gūwalgiya clan played an important role in Nurhaci's military efforts, especially during the Battle of Sarhū. Their involvement in the war earned them a prominent position among the rising Manchu nobility.

== Structure and Branches ==
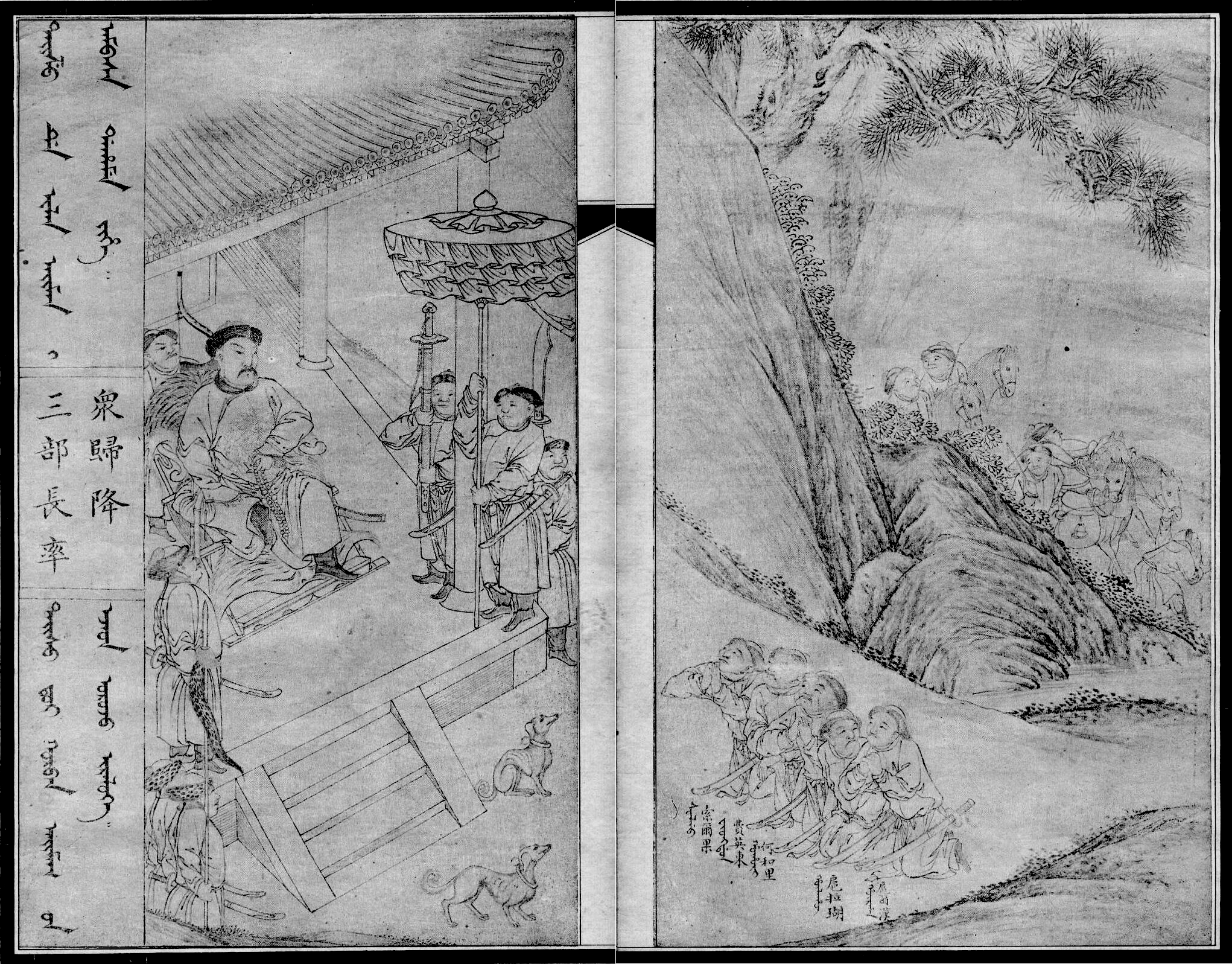
Manchu Veritable Records depicted the submission of Suwan chieftain Solgo(first person kneeling on the left) and his son Fiongdon(second person on the left)

The Clan is composed of several branches, each contributing to its legacy.

Suwan Gūwalgiya is well known for its power and historical significance. It produced many influential leaders and military figures during the Qing dynasty. These leaders played a vital role in the clan's influence in the Manchu nobility.

Yehe Gūwalgiya was recognized for its important military role. It has participated in several major conflicts that changed the political situation in Northeast Asia. Their strategic thinking and combat skills helped the clan succeed in these conflicts.

Hada Gūwalgiya made significant contributions to the administration of the Qing Dynasty. They helped organize the government and establish a stable rule over new territories that the Qing had taken control of.

Ula Gūwalgiya played a vital role in military defense and local governance. They were responsible for protecting the clan's interests and ensuring their influence in various military campaigns.

Shushu Gūwalgiya is known for its cultural contributions. They played a vital role in preserving and promoting cultural traditions. Throughout history, several prominent figures from the branch emerged as scholars, and cultural icons.

== Notable Military efforts ==
The Gūwalgiya clan has a rich military history, participating in several key conflicts that were an vital role in the establishment of the Qing Dynasty.

=== The Battle of Sarhu (1619) ===
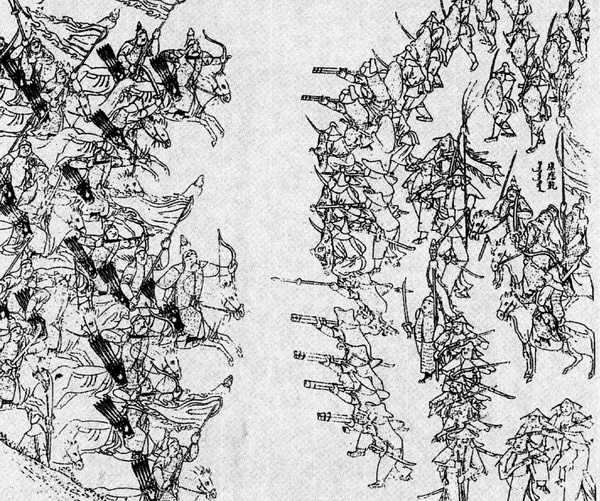
The Battle of Sarhū

Among the Gwalgiya clan's most significant conflicts was the Battle of Sarhu (1619). It was a war between Nurhaci, ruler of the Later Jin, and the combined forces of the Ming and various Jurchen tribes.

The Gūwalgiya clan, under the leadership of Gūwalgiya Gaha, played an important role in this battle. Their military forces used smart strategies and strong fighting skills, which were an vital piece in helping Nurhaci to victory. The victory at Sarhū not only strengthened Nurhaci's power but also changed the fight against the Ming Dynasty.

== Notable figures ==
=== Males ===
- Fiongdon (費英東; 1562–1620), close associate of Nurhaci
  - Huisai (輝塞; d. 1651), Fiongdon's grandson
    - Fuzhen (d. 1909), Huisai's descendant
- Oboi (1610–1669), Fiongdon's nephew; served as one of the Four Regents of the Kangxi Emperor
- Nardu (訥爾杜; d. 1676), Oboi's nephew
- Bahai (d. 1696), early Qing dynasty general
- Wenxiang (1818–1876), late Qing dynasty statesman
- Ronglu (1836–1903), late Qing dynasty mandarin, major confidant of Empress Dowager Cixi
- Guan Xiangying (關向應; 1902–1946), Communist fighter, leader of the Communist Youth League of China
- Guan Xuezeng (關學曾; 1922–2006), Chinese actor
- Kwan Shan (1933–2012), Hong Kong actor
- John Kuan (born 1940), Kuomintang politician in Taiwan

Prince Consort

Date	Prince Consort	Background	Princess
1614 or 1615	Fiongdon		Cuyen's first daughter (1601–1662) by primary consort (Yehe Nara)
1651	Huisai		Hong Taiji's tenth daughter (1635–1661) by mistress (Nara)
1652	Laha (拉哈)		Hong Taiji's 13th daughter (1638–1657) by mistress (Nara)
	Huanghai (黃海)		Yebušu's first daughter (1652–1728) by primary consort (Tubusu)
1667	Na'erdu		Princess Gongque (1654–1685), the Shunzhi Emperor's second daughter by mistress (Yang)
1688	Du'erma (杜爾瑪)		Changning's second daughter (1674–1695) by mistress (Chen)
1698	Du'erma (杜爾瑪)		Changning's sixth daughter (1684–1712) by mistress (Niohuru)
1873	Fuzhen		Princess Rong'an (1855–1875), the Xianfeng Emperor's first daughter by Imperial Noble Consort Zhuangjing (Tatara)
1906	Liangkui (良揆)	Adopted father: Ronglu	Yikuang's sixth daughter by secondary consort (Jingiya)

=== Females ===
- Rosamund Kwan (born 1962), Hong Kong entertainer
- Kathy Chow (1966–2023), Hong Kong actress
- Guan Xiaotong (born 1997), Chinese actress

Imperial Consort

- Imperial Noble Consort
  - Hanjiuchun, Imperial Noble Consort Dunyi (1683–1768), the Kangxi Emperor's consort, the mother of 18th daughter (1701)
- Imperial Concubine
  - Imperial Concubine Jian (d. 1780), the Jiaqing Emperor's concubine, the mother of first daughter (1780–1783)
  - Imperial Concubine An (1785–1837), the Jiaqing Emperor's first class female attendant

Princess Consort

- Primary Consort
  - Šurhaci's fourth primary consort (d. 1623), the mother of Jasahatu (1589–1609), Princess (1590–1649), sixth daughter (b. 1595), Turan (1596–1614), seventh daughter (b. 1597), Jaisanggū (1598–1625), Nuomudai (1601–1613), eighth daughter (b. 1602), ninth daughter and tenth daughter (b. 1603)
  - Šurhaci's seventh primary consort, the mother of Fiyanggū (1605–1644)
  - Yunreng's primary consort (d. 1718), the mother of Princess (1697–1735)
  - Yunxu's primary consort, the mother of second daughter (1716–1726)
  - Mianyu's first primary consort (d. 1835), the mother of first son (1835)
  - Mianyu's second primary consort (d. 1852), the mother of Yixiang (1849–1886)
  - Yiwei's primary consort (d. 1827)
  - Yixin's primary consort (1834–1880), the mother of Princess Rongshou (1854–1924), Zaicheng (1858–1885), second daughter (1860–1864) and Zaijun (1864–1866)
  - Youlan (1884–1921), Zaifeng's primary consort, the mother of Puyi (1906–1967), Pujie (1907–1994), Yunying (1909–1925), Yunhe (1911–2001) and Yunying (1913–1992)
- Secondary Consort
  - Fuquan's secondary consort, the mother of fourth daughter (1681 – 1682 or 1683), Baotai (1682–1730) and Baoshou (1684–1706)
  - Yunki's secondary consort, the mother of Hongzhi (1700–1775), third son (1702–1707), Hong'ang (1705–1782), fifth son (1707) and fifth daughter (1708–1710)
  - Yuntao's secondary consort, the mother of third daughter (1728)
  - Yinxiang's secondary consort, the mother of Princess (1703–1776) and Hongchang (1706–1771)
  - Yunxu's secondary consort, the mother of first daughter (1716–1717), first son (1718–1719), second son (1719–1720), third daughter (1722–1730), Lady (1722–1745), Hongqing (1724–1770), Hongshou (1727–1731) and fifth daughter (1729–1748)
  - Yongzhang's secondary consort, the mother of Lady (1755–1777)
- Concubine
  - Dodo's concubine, the mother of Bakedu (1640–1668)
  - Dodo's concubine, the mother of Zhakedu (1644–1689)
  - Hooge's concubine, the mother of first daughter (1631–1692)

== See also ==
- List of Manchu clans
