= Youlan (Gūwalgiya) =

Chinese princess consort (1884-1921)

- Primary Princess Consort Chun
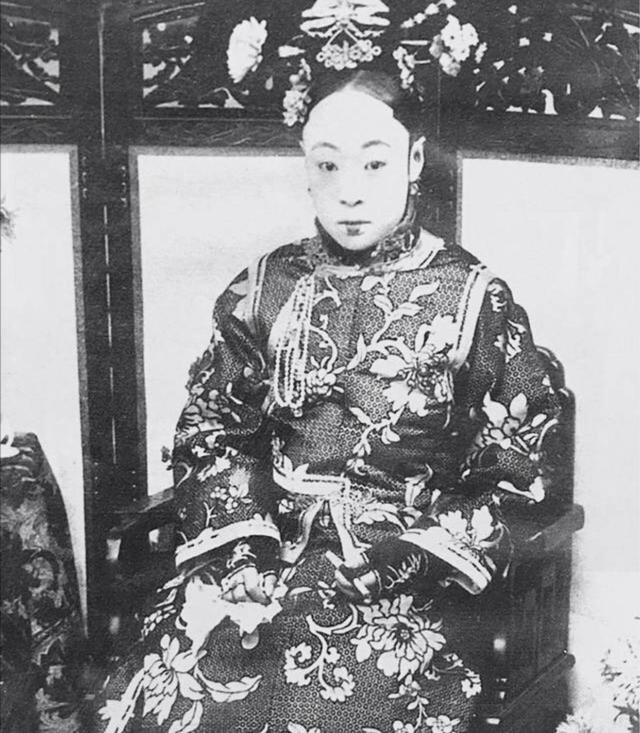
- Youlan in the early 1900s
- Born: Youlan (幼蘭); 1884 (光緒十年)
- Died: 30 September 1921 (aged 36–37); Prince Chun's Mansion, Jingzhao Area, Republic of China
- Spouse: Zaifeng, Prince Chun of the First Rank (m. 1902–1921)
- Issue: Xuantong Emperor; Pujie; Yunying; Yunhe; Yunying
Names
- Gūwalgiya Youlan (瓜爾佳·幼蘭)
- House: Gūwalgiya (by birth); Aisin Gioro (by marriage)

Youlan (1884 – 30 September 1921), of the Manchu Plain White Banner Gūwalgiya clan, was a consort of Zaifeng and the mother of Puyi (Xuantong Emperor), the last emperor of China's Qing dynasty.

== Life ==
=== Family background ===
- Father: Ronglu (1836–1903), served as the Minister of Works from 1878 to 1879, the Minister of War from 1895 to 1898, the Viceroy of Zhili in 1898 and a Grand Secretary in the Wenhua Hall (文華殿) from 1898 to 1902 and the Wenyuan Library from 1902 to 1903, and held the title of a first class baron (一等男)
  - Paternal grandfather: Changshou (長壽; d. 1852)
  - Paternal grandmother: Lady Uja
- Mother: Lady Aisin Gioro
  - Maternal grandfather: Linggui (靈桂; 1815–1885), served as a Grand Secretary in the Tiren Library (體仁閣) from 1881 to 1884 and the Wuying Hall (武英殿) from 1884 to 1885, Changning's great-great-great-great-great-great-grandson
  - Maternal grandmother: Lady Sun
- One sister: wife of Prince Li (禮) Chenghou

=== Guangxu era ===
Lady Gūwalgiya's father was a staunch supporter of Empress Dowager Cixi. In return, the Empress Dowager arranged for Lady Gūwalgiya to marry Zaifeng, a younger half-brother of the Guangxu Emperor. Zaifeng was the son of Yixuan, Prince Chun and Liugiya Cuiyan. The marriage, which took place in October 1902, turned out to be an unhappy one, partly because Zaifeng disliked Ronglu due to his support for the Empress Dowager.

Lady Gūwalgiya gave birth on 7 February 1906 to Zaifeng's first son, Puyi, and on 16 April 1907 to his second son, Pujie.

=== Xuantong era ===
Following the Guangxu Emperor's death on 14 November 1908, Lady Gūwalgiya was separated from Puyi after he was "adopted" into the imperial lineage to succeed the Guangxu Emperor. This meant that Puyi was no longer legally her son. She was only allowed to see Puyi on rare occasions, and his upbringing was entrusted to palace eunuchs and maids.

Lady Gūwalgiya gave birth in 1909 to Zaifeng's first daughter, Yunying, in 1911 to his second daughter, Yunhe, and in 1913 to his third daughter, Yunying.

=== Republican era ===
Lady Gūwalgiya committed suicide on 30 September 1921 by swallowing opium after being publicly reprimanded by Dowager Consort Duankang for Puyi's misconduct. Her age at that time is not exactly known (given the inaccuracies of her place and date of birth), but it is estimated between 36 and 37 years old.

== Titles ==
- During the reign of the Guangxu Emperor (r. 1875–1908):
  - Lady Gūwalgiya (from 1884)
  - Princess Consort Chun of the First Rank (醇亲王福晋; from October 1902)
- During the Republic of China (r. 1912–1949):
  - Imperial Princess Consort Chun (醇亲王妃; from 30 September 1921)

== Issue ==
- As primary consort:
  - Puyi (溥儀; 7 February 1906 – 17 October 1967), Zaifeng's first son, enthroned on 2 December 1908 as the Xuantong Emperor
  - Pujie (溥杰; 16 April 1907 – 28 February 1994), Zaifeng's second son
  - Zaifeng's first daughter (1909–1925), personal name Yunying (韞瑛)
    - Married Runliang (潤良; 1904–1925) of the Daur Gobulo (郭布羅) clan
  - Zaifeng's second daughter (1911–2001), personal name Yunhe (韞和)
    - Married Zheng Guangyuan (鄭廣元), grandson of Zheng Xiaoxu
  - Zaifeng's third daughter (1913–1992), personal name Yunying (韞穎)
    - Married Runqi (潤麒; 1912–2007) of the Daur Gobulo (郭布羅) clan in 1931
