= Jin Yunying =

Chinese princess (1913–1992)

Aisin Gioro Yunying
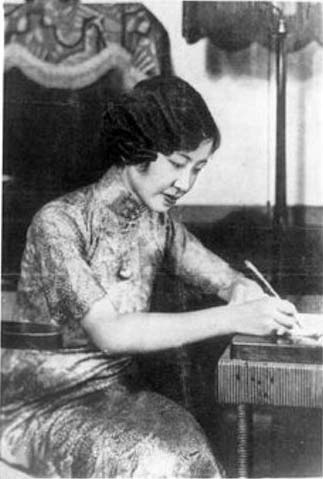
- Jin Yunying
- Born: Aisin Gioro Yunying (愛新覺羅·韞穎); 1913; Forbidden City, Shuntian Prefecture, Republic of China
- Died: 1992 (aged 78–79); People's Republic of China
- Spouse: Runqi
- Issue: Zongyan; Zongguang; Manruo
Names
- Jin Yunying (金韞穎)
- House: Aisin Gioro (by birth); Gobulo (郭布羅; by marriage)
- Father: Zaifeng, Prince Chun of the First Rank
- Mother: Youlan

Jin Yunying
- Traditional Chinese: 金韞穎
- Simplified Chinese: 金韫颖
Transcriptions
Standard Mandarin
- Hanyu Pinyin: Jīn Yùnyǐng

Ruixiu (courtesy name)
- Traditional Chinese: 蕊秀
- Simplified Chinese: 蕊秀
Transcriptions
Standard Mandarin
- Hanyu Pinyin: Ruǐxiù

Binghao (art name)
- Traditional Chinese: 秉顥
- Simplified Chinese: 秉颢
Transcriptions
Standard Mandarin
- Hanyu Pinyin: Bǐnghào

Yunying, better known as Jin Yunying (Chinese: 金韞穎; 1913–1992), was a Chinese princess of the Qing dynasty.

== Names ==
Yunying's original family name was Aisin Gioro; she is referred to as "Yunying" because Manchus were usually referred to by their given names only. Like other members of the Aisin Gioro family (e.g. her brother Puren (Jin Youzhi)), she changed her family name to Jin, which means "gold" in the Chinese language just like "Aisin" in the Manchu language.

Yunying's courtesy name, Ruixiu, was given to her by her father, Zaifeng. Her art name, Binghao, was given to her by her brother Puyi. She is also sometimes referred to as Jin Ruixiu.

Reginald Johnston, the Scottish academic and diplomat who tutored Puyi, gave Yunying an English name, Lily.

== Life ==
=== Early life ===
Yunying was born in the Manchu Aisin Gioro clan in 1913 as the third daughter of Prince Chun and Princess Consort Youlan. She was also a full sister of Puyi (the Xuantong Emperor) the last Emperor of China. She had three other full siblings (one brother and two sisters) and six half siblings (two brothers and four sisters). By the time of her birth, the Manchu-led Qing dynasty had already been overthrown by the Xinhai Revolution and Puyi, who was still a child then, had been forced to abdicate. However, the former imperial family were still allowed to live in the Forbidden City, where she was born. She was referred to as "Third Princess" (三格格) in her childhood and was Puyi's favourite sister. In November 1924, the warlord Feng Yuxiang took control of Beijing and forced the former imperial family out of the Forbidden City. They moved to Tianjin's Heping District. In Tianjin, Yunying and her siblings learned the Japanese language and played tennis.

=== Life in Manchuria ===
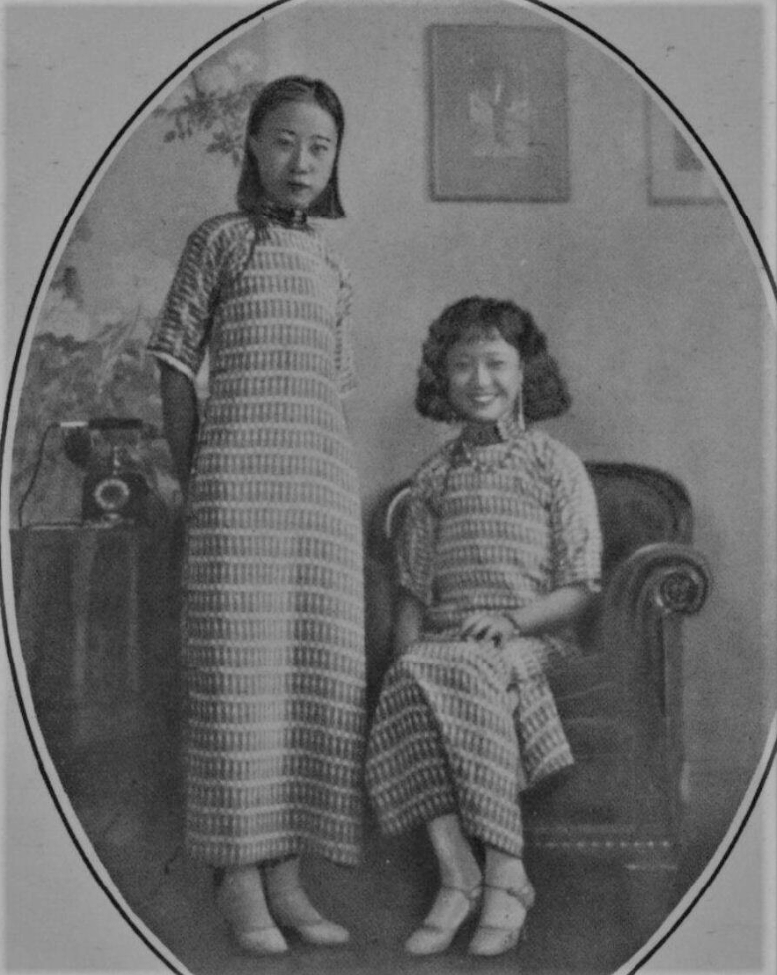
Yunying with Yunhe

When Yunying turned 19, Puyi arranged for her to be married to Runqi of the Gobulo (郭布羅) clan. Runqi was the younger brother of Wanrong, Puyi's empress. In 1931, Puyi was installed as emperor of Manchukuo, a puppet state established by the Empire of Japan in northeastern China. Yunying and Runqi were married in Xinjing (present-day Changchun, Jilin), the capital of Manchukuo. About a month after the wedding, Puyi sent Runqi, Pujie and Yunying to Japan for studies. When Yunying arrived there, she was immediately approached by members of the Japanese imperial family, who wanted her to serve as the honorary president of the women's association. One of the Shōwa Emperor's sisters-in-law also specially invited her to their residence to teach them the Chinese language.

Yunying felt lonely during her stay in Japan, so she often wrote to Puyi. He had their letters compiled into a book. In 1933, she returned to Xinjing to visit her family and decided to remain in China. Runqi accompanied her and served in Manchukuo as an instructor in a military school. In his memoirs, Puyi described Yunying as spoiled, idle, and interested in pointless matters during the Manchukuo period, foremost to be in his favour. When he gave a gift to another member of their family, she wished to be given the same. According to Puyi, Yunying later said about this period in her life: "What was I before, but an ornament?"

=== Later life ===
At the end of the Second Sino-Japanese War in 1945, Soviet forces invaded and occupied northeastern China. Yunying and her family were evacuated by train from Xinjing to Dalizigou (in present-day Linjiang, Jilin); her husband, their three children Zongyan (宗弇), Zongguang (宗光) and Manruo (曼若), her sister, her brothers, the family's physician and a servant took a plane to Mukden (present-day Shenyang, Liaoning), where Puyi was arrested and taken to a prison camp in Siberia. Runqi was also taken prisoner and was not released until 1957. Yunying, left with only a few sets of clothing, brought her three children with her to Tonghua. She supported herself and her children by collecting and selling used clothes at a tobacco stand on the streets, where she was taken captive and publicly interrogated about her life. She was released later and allowed to return to Tonghua.

In 1949, after Chinese Communist forces occupied Beijing, Yunying and her children were allowed to return to Beijing to reunite and live with the rest of her family. In 1951, after her father's death, she inherited part of his properties and managed to make a living through collecting rental fees. Since then, she had been actively involved in subdistrict affairs in her neighbourhood, and was later nominated by the residents to be the subdistrict representative. As a politician, she often spoke for the new marriage law. Since then, she was described as a beautiful, good-hearted woman with sound political aspirations.

In 1954, Zhang Shizhao, the president of the Central Research Institute of Culture and History, chanced upon the book containing the letters exchanged between Yunying and Puyi. With help from their uncle, Zaitao, Zhang Shizhao contacted Yunying and asked her to write an autobiography, which he then presented to Mao Zedong. After reading her autobiography, Mao Zedong commented, "A person who enters society becomes someone with aspirations." He then sent the autobiography to Zhou Enlai for him to read too and appointed her as a delegate representing Beijing's Dongcheng District in the Chinese People's Political Consultative Conference. In 1956, with permission from Mao Zedong, she and Zaitao travelled to the Fushun War Criminals Management Centre to visit Puyi, who was detained there as a war criminal.

Yunying died in China, in 1992. She was survived by all her children. Her husband, who had become the owner of a small clinic that treated gynecological diseases and nervous disorders, was interviewed by The New York Times in 2000 and died in 2007.

== Gallery ==
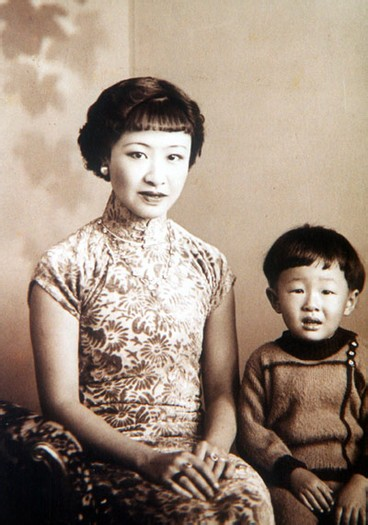
Yunying and her son, Zongyan

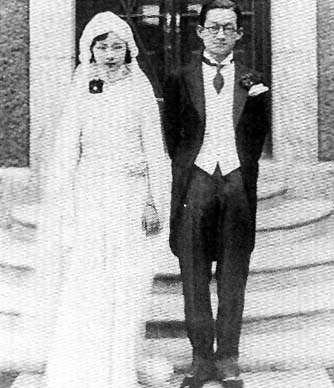
Yunying and her husband, Runqi

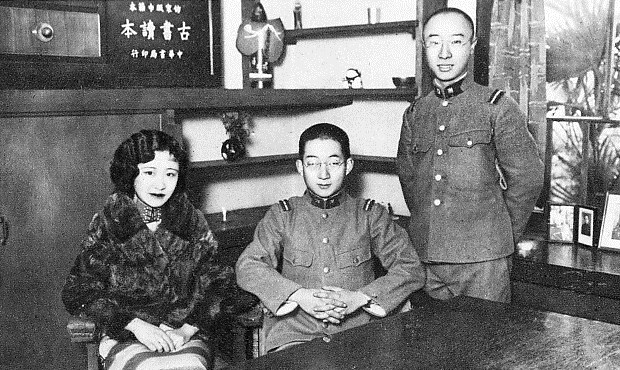
Yunying with her husband, Runqi (seated), and her brother Pujie (standing)
