= Ronglu =

Qing dynasty politician and military leader (1836–1903)

First Class Baron Ronglu
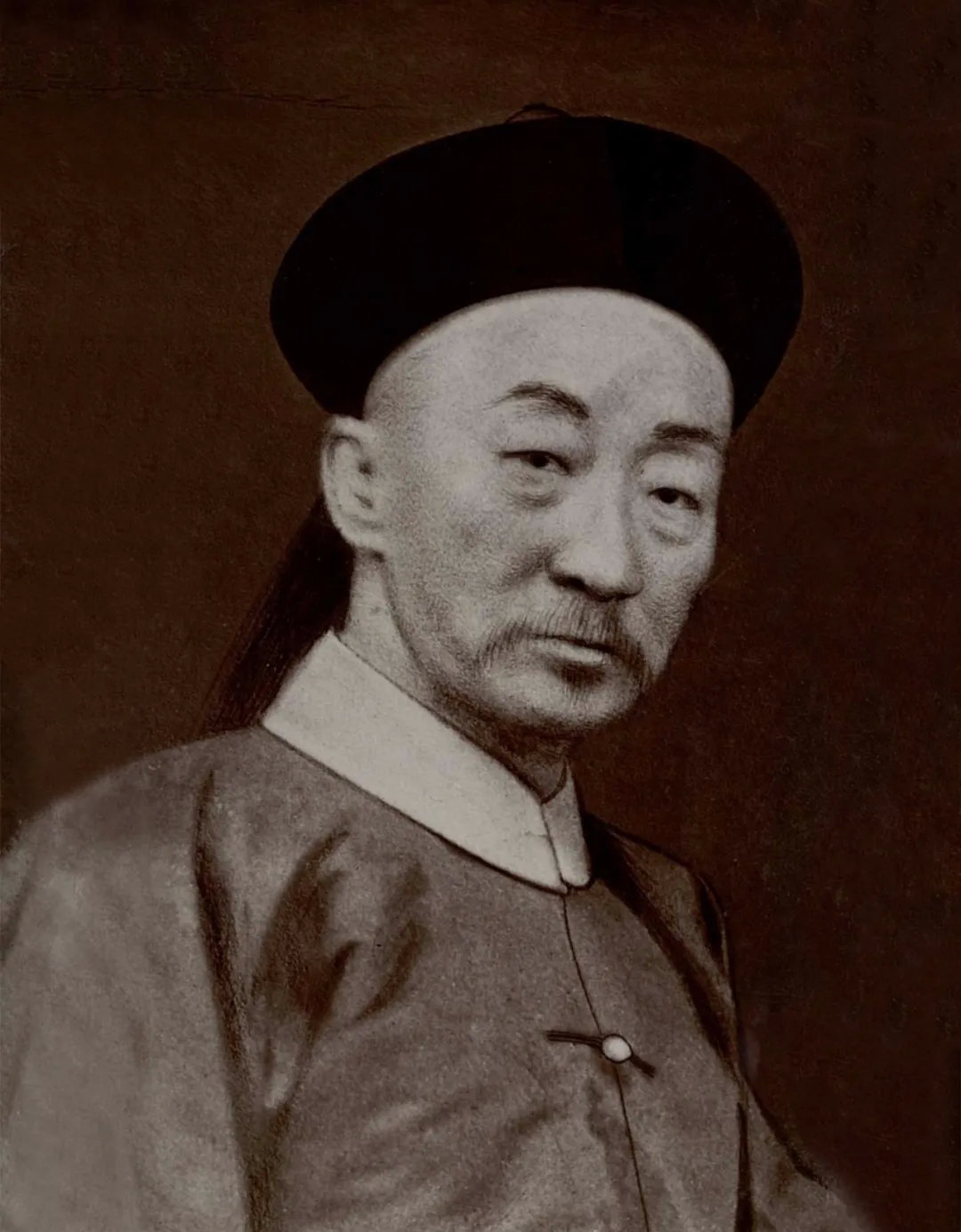

Chief Grand Councillor
- In office 16 August 1901 – 11 April 1903
- Preceded by: Shiduo
- Succeeded by: Yikuang

Grand Councillor
- In office 10 June 1898 – 11 April 1903

Grand Secretary of the Wenhua Hall
- In office 2 February 1902 – 11 April 1903
- Preceded by: Li Hongzhang
- Succeeded by: Shixu

Grand Secretary of the Wenyuan Library
- In office 22 June 1898 – 2 February 1902
- Preceded by: Linshu
- Succeeded by: Shixu

Assistant Grand Secretary
- In office 4 June 1896 – 10 June 1898

Viceroy of Zhili
- In office 15 June 1898 – 28 September 1898
- Preceded by: Wang Wenshao
- Succeeded by: Yuan Shikai

Minister of War
- In office 11 August 1895 – 10 June 1898
- Preceded by: Jingxin
- Succeeded by: Gangyi

Minister of Works
- In office 15 June 1878 – 19 January 1879
- Preceded by: Jinglian
- Succeeded by: Quanqing

Personal details
- Born: 6 April 1836
- Died: 11 April 1903 (aged 67) Beijing, Qing China
- Spouse: Wanzhen
- Relations: Changshou (father); Zaifeng (son-in-law); Puyi (grandson)
- Children: Youlan (daughter)
- Occupation: politician
- Clan: Guwalgiya
- Posthumous name: Wenzhong (文忠)

Military service
- Allegiance: Qing Dynasty
- Branch/service: Manchu Plain White Banner
- Battles/wars: Boxer Rebellion

Ronglu
- Traditional Chinese: 榮祿
- Simplified Chinese: 荣禄
Transcriptions
Standard Mandarin
- Hanyu Pinyin: Rónglù
- Wade–Giles: Jung-lu

Zhonghua (courtesy name)
- Traditional Chinese: 仲華
- Simplified Chinese: 仲华
Transcriptions
Standard Mandarin
- Hanyu Pinyin: Zhònghuá
- Wade–Giles: Chung-hua

Ronglu (6 April 1836 – 11 April 1903), courtesy name Zhonghua, was a Manchu political and military leader of the late Qing dynasty. He was born in the Guwalgiya clan, which was under the Plain White Banner of the Manchu Eight Banners. Deeply favoured by Empress Dowager Cixi, he served in a number of important civil and military positions in the Qing government, including the Zongli Yamen, Grand Council, Grand Secretary, Viceroy of Zhili, Beiyang Trade Minister, Secretary of Defence, Nine Gates Infantry Commander, and Wuwei Corps Commander. He was also the maternal grandfather of Puyi, the last Emperor of China and the Qing dynasty.

== Early life and career ==
Ronglu was born in the Manchu Guwalgiya clan, which was under the Plain White Banner of the Manchu Eight Banners. His grandfather, Tasiha (塔斯哈), served as an Imperial Resident in Kashgar. His father, Changshou (長壽), was a zongbing (總兵; a military commander).

Ronglu was a yinsheng (蔭生), a type of position awarded to civil service candidates who successfully gained admission to the Guozijian (Imperial Academy). He started his career in the Ministry of Works as a yuanwailang (員外郎; assistant director) and was tasked with constructing roads in Zhili Province.

In the early years of the Tongzhi Emperor's reign (early 1860s), he set up the Firearms Division and was rewarded with the position of a jingtang (京堂; fifth-grade magistrate). He was also appointed as a flank commander (翼長) and zhuancao dachen (專操大臣) before being transferred to be a zongbing (總兵) of the left flank. Through Wenxiang's recommendation, he became the Vice Secretary (侍郎) of the Ministry of Works. Later, he was reassigned to the Ministry of Revenue and concurrently appointed as Minister of the Imperial Household Department.

== Mid career ==
The Tongzhi Emperor died in 1875 and was succeeded by his cousin, the Guangxu Emperor. In the same year, Ronglu became an infantry commander (步軍統領). Three years later, he was reassigned to be a Left Censor-in-Chief (左都御史) and Secretary of Works. In 1878, Baoting (寶廷) wrote a memorial to the imperial court, pointing out that certain officials concurrently held too many appointments, hence Ronglu was relieved of his duties as Secretary of Works and Minister of the Imperial Household Department.

Ronglu was initially accused of accepting bribes and was demoted by two grades. He also offended Prince Chun, Baojun (寶鋆) and Shen Guifen (沈桂芬) and was forced to retire in early 1879. However, in 1891, he was restored to the civil service and appointed as General of Xi'an.

In 1894, Ronglu was recalled from Xi'an to the capital Beijing to attend Empress Dowager Cixi's birthday celebrations. He was appointed again as an infantry commander (步軍統領). During the First Sino-Japanese War of 1894–1895, Ronglu, along with Prince Gong and Prince Qing, were in charge of military affairs. After the Qing and Japanese empires reached a peace settlement, Ronglu nominated Yuan Shikai to oversee the creation and training of the New Army.

In 1896, Ronglu was appointed as Secretary of Defence and Assistant Grand Secretary (協辦大學士). He also proposed transferring Dong Fuxiang and his Gansu Army to Beijing to defend the capital and enhance the training of the New Army.

== Hundred Days' Reform ==
In 1898, Ronglu was promoted to Grand Secretary (大學士) and subsequently assumed the following additional appointments: Viceroy of Zhili Province, Beiyang Trade Minister (北洋通商大臣), and Grand Secretary of Wenyuan Cabinet (文淵閣大學士) overseeing the Ministry of Justice. Around the time, a group of officials led by Kang Youwei and Tan Sitong planned to carry out a series of reforms and get rid of conservative elements in the government. The Guangxu Emperor supported the reformists. Yuan Shikai was summoned from Zhili Province to Beijing and appointed as a Vice Secretary (侍郎). Ronglu felt uneasy.

Acting on the advice of Yang Chongyi (楊崇伊), Empress Dowager Cixi interfered in the situation and launched the 1898 Coup against the reformists. Ronglu was appointed to the Grand Council and sided with the Empress Dowager in the coup. The reformists were defeated – six of their leaders (including Tan Sitong) were executed – and the Guangxu Emperor was placed under house arrest. After the coup, Ronglu was relieved of his appointments as Viceroy of Zhili Province and Beiyang Minister, and reappointed as Secretary of Defence to oversee the Beiyang Army.

In 1899, Ronglu was granted authority as Imperial Commissioner in charge of military training (練兵欽差大臣) and put in command of the military units led by Nie Shicheng, Dong Fuxiang, Song Qing and Yuan Shikai. He established the Wuwei Corps, composed of five divisions led by the four commanders and himself.

Around the time, Empress Dowager Cixi had the intention of deposing the Guangxu Emperor and replacing him with Prince Duan's son Puzhuan (溥僎; 1875–1920). Ronglu was initially undecided on this issue, but eventually he opposed the Empress Dowager's idea. She heeded his advice and designated Puzhuan as "First Prince" (大阿哥) instead.

== Boxer Rebellion ==
In 1900, after the Boxer Rebellion had broken out, Prince Duan and others initially convinced Empress Dowager Cixi to support the Boxers to counter foreigners. Dong Fuxiang led his Gansu Army to attack the foreign legations in Beijing but was unable to conquer the legations despite a few months of siege. Ronglu was unable to stop him. Prince Duan and his followers continued to press the attacks against foreigners and kill any official in the imperial court who opposed them.

When Beijing fell to the forces of the Eight-Nation Alliance, Empress Dowager Cixi and the Guangxu Emperor fled to Xi'an. Ronglu requested to accompany them but was denied permission; instead, he was ordered to remain in Beijing.

Ronglu did not want to antagonise Empress Dowager Cixi, but was not sympathetic towards the Boxers. Like the leading governors in the south, he felt that it was foolish for the Qing Empire to take on all the eight foreign powers at once. When Dong Fuxiang's Gansu Army was eager to attack the legations, Ronglu made sure that the siege was not pressed home. The xenophobic Prince Duan, who was a close friend of Dong Fuxiang, wanted Dong's forces to be equipped with artillery to destroy the legations. Ronglu blocked the transfer of artillery to Dong Fuxiang, preventing him from destroying the legations. When artillery was finally supplied to the Qing imperial forces and Boxers, it was only done so in limited quantities.

Ronglu also kept Nie Shicheng from finding out about an imperial decree that ordered him to stop fighting the Boxers. Nie Shicheng continued to fight the Boxers and killed many of them. Ronglu also ordered Nie Shicheng to protect foreigners and protect the railway from attacks by the Boxers. Ronglu had effectively derailed Prince Duan's efforts to capture the legations, and as a result, saved the foreigners inside. He was shocked that he was not welcome after the war; however, the foreign powers did not demand that he, unlike Dong Fuxiang, be punished.

In 1901, Empress Dowager Cixi issued five imperial decrees. The first ordered Ronglu to "command various imperial forces, including the Beijing Field Force, the Hushenying, with cavalry and the Wuwei Corps, to suppress these rebels (Boxers), to intensify searching patrol; to arrest and execute immediately all criminals with weapons who advocate killing." The fourth decree ordered Ronglu to "send efficient troops of the Wuwei Corps swiftly, to the Beijing Legation Quarter, to protect all the diplomatic buildings."

== Later career and death ==
In late 1900, Empress Dowager Cixi summoned Ronglu to Xi'an, where he was warmly received. He was awarded a yellow jacket, a two-eyed peacock feather, and a purple girdle. He escorted the Empress Dowager and the Guangxu Emperor back to the capital later.

In 1901, Ronglu was put in charge of the Ministry of Revenue. Later that year, he supported the reforms proposed by Liu Kunyi and Zhang Zhidong in their memorial titled Jiang Chu Hui Zou Bian Fa San Zhe (江楚會奏變法三折). In 1902, he was given additional honorary appointments as Crown Prince's Grand Protector (太子太保) and Grand Secretary of Wenhua Hall (文華殿大學士).

Ronglu died in 1903 and was posthumously granted the honorary appointment of Grand Tutor (太傅). He was also awarded the posthumous name "Wenzhong" (文忠) and posthumously enfeoffed as a first class baron (一等男爵).

== Relationship with Empress Dowager Cixi ==
Before Lady Yehenara (the future Empress Dowager Cixi) became a consort of the Xianfeng Emperor, Ronglu was allegedly in a romantic relationship with her. During Empress Dowager Cixi's tenure as regent of the Qing dynasty, Ronglu joined the Empress Dowager's conservative faction at the imperial court and opposed the Hundred Days' Reform in 1898. The Empress Dowager always remembered Ronglu's support for her, even when they were young, and rewarded him by allowing his only surviving child, his daughter Youlan, to marry into the imperial clan.

Through Youlan's marriage to Zaifeng (Prince Chun), Ronglu was the maternal grandfather of Puyi, the last emperor of the Qing dynasty.

== Family ==
Consorts and issue(s):

- Wife, of the Sakda clan (正室薩克達氏)
- Wife of the Aisin-Gioro clan (正室愛新覺羅氏)
- Concubine, of the Liu clan (妾劉氏)
  - Youlan, Imperial Princess Consort Chun (亲王福晋瓜爾佳幼蘭; 1884 – 30 September 1921), 2nd daughter
    - Married Zaifeng, Prince Chun, grandson of Daoguang, and had issue (two sons and three daughters)
- Unknown
  - Lunhou (纶厚), 1st son
  - Second daughter

== Portrayal in media ==
- Leo Genn portrayed Jung-lu (Ronglu) in the 1963 film 55 Days at Peking.
- Feng Shaofeng also portrayed Ronglu in the 2006 television series Sigh of His Highness.
- Portrayed by Han Xinmin in the 2006 television series Princess Der Ling.
- Portrayed by Mark Kitto in his one-man play Chinese Boxing.

== See also ==
- Imperial decree of declaration of war against foreign powers
- Imperial decree on events leading to the signing of Boxer Protocol
- Peking Field Force
