= Li Yuqin =

Concubine of emperor Puyi (1928–2001)

- Noble Lady Fu
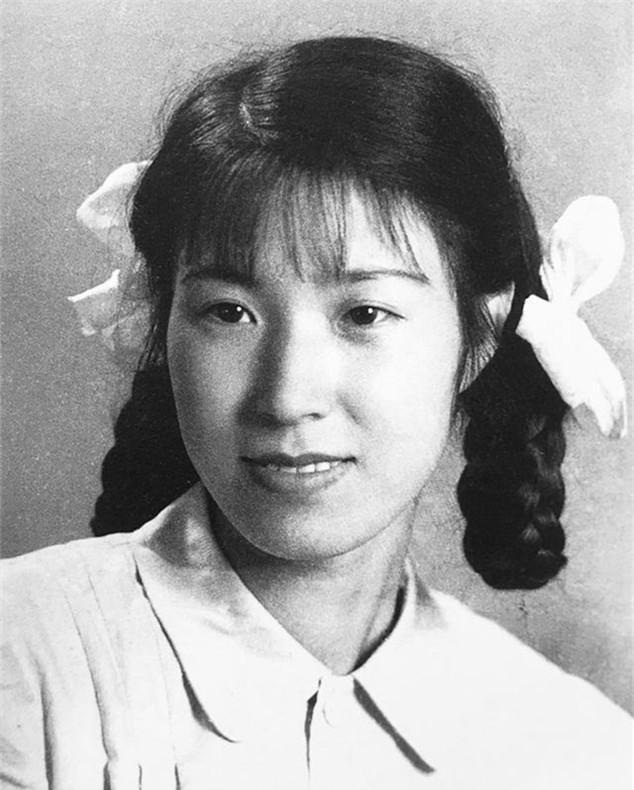
- Born: 15 July 1928; Changchun, Jilin, Republic of China
- Died: 24 April 2001 (aged 72); Changchun, Jilin, China
- Spouse: Puyi (m. 1943; div. 1957); Huang Yugeng (m. 1958)
- Issue: Two sons with Huang Yugeng
- Father: Li Degui
- Mother: Wang Xiuru

Li Yuqin
- Chinese: 李玉琴
Transcriptions
Standard Mandarin
- Hanyu Pinyin: Lǐ Yùqín
- Wade–Giles: Li^{3} Yü^{4}-ch'in^{2}
Yue: Cantonese
- Jyutping: Lei^{5} Yuk^{6}-kam^{4}

Li Yuqin (15 July 1928 – 24 April 2001), sometimes referred to as the "Last Imperial Concubine" (Chinese: 末代皇娘), was the fourth wife of China's last emperor Puyi. She married Puyi when the latter was the nominal ruler of Manchukuo, a puppet state established by the Empire of Japan during the Second Sino-Japanese War.

== Biography ==
Li Yuqin was a Han Chinese woman who was born in Changchun to a middle class family from Shandong. Her father, Li Degui was a translator to a local missionary organisation, while her mother, Wang Xiuru, was the owner of a small silk farm in Changchun’s outskirts. Both sides of Li’s family served the imperial court, with her paternal great grandmother being the wet nurse to the Xianfeng Emperor’s daughter and her maternal family being court physicians. After the fall of the Qing dynasty, many people who worked in the imperial court were banished by republican forces to the countryside provinces, which is how the Li family ended up in the commoner class. Li had two brothers and three sisters and had a relatively happy childhood.

Li attended Nanling Girls' Academy (新京南嶺女子優級學校) in Changchun, then known as Hsinking, the capital of Manchukuo. In February 1943, Li and nine other girl students were taken by their principal Kobayashi and teacher Fujii to a photography studio for portraits. Three weeks later, the school principal and teacher visited Li's home and told her that Manchukuo's emperor Puyi had ordered her to go to the palace to study. She was first taken directly to Yasunao Yoshioka, who thoroughly questioned her. Yoshioka then drove her back to her parents and told them Puyi ordered her to study at the palace. Money was promised to the parents. She was subjected to a medical examination and then taken to Puyi's sister Yunhe and instructed in palace protocol. Li then became a concubine of Puyi and was given the title of Noble Lady Fu (福貴人). She lived a lavish lifestyle and had many servants. Li stated that she and Puyi only consummated their relationship once and never had sex again.

In 1945 the Manchukuo regime collapsed following the Japanese surrender at the end of World War II. Li attempted to flee from Changchun, alongside Puyi, Empress Wanrong and other remaining members of the old Qing court. She, as well as the rest of Puyi's family was evacuated with him by train from Changchun to Dalizigou. From there, however, Puyi continued by plane with only two of his sisters, his brothers, three nephews, his physician and a servant to Mukden, where he was arrested and taken to the Soviet Union. According to Puyi, Li Yuqin was very frightened and begged to be taken with him, when he left from Dalizigou to Mukden, but he assured her that she and Wanrong could reach Japan as well by train. Some documents state that Puyi let the women go by train in the belief that women would be better treated by the military than men.

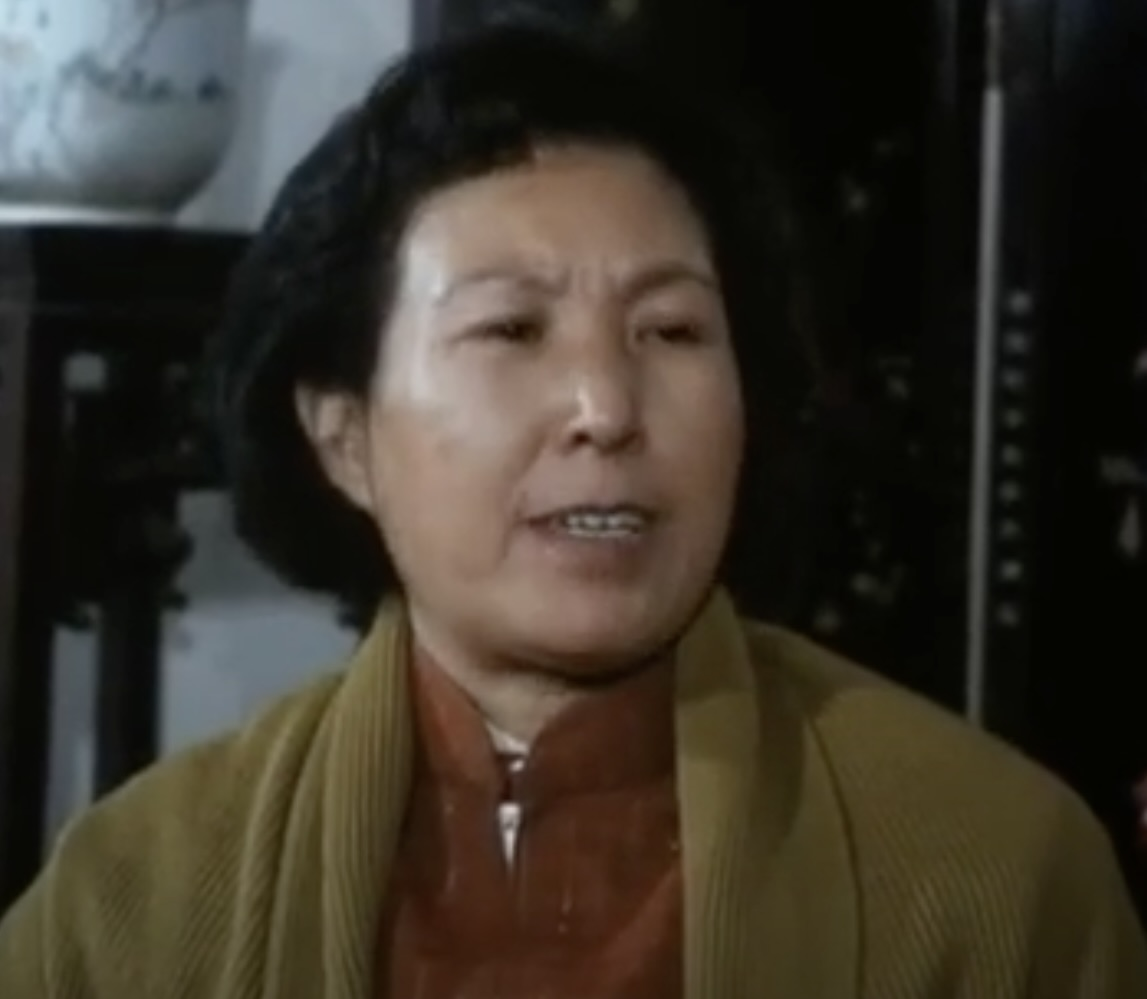
Li Yuqin in the 1980s

They were shortly arrested by Soviet forces and sent to a prison in Changchun. Empress Wanrong was experiencing significant opium withdrawal symptoms at that time. Empress Wanrong died shortly in the same year before Li was released in 1946 and sent back home. She worked in a textile factory and in a library in Changchun, studying the works of Karl Marx and Vladimir Lenin. In 1955 she began visiting Puyi in prison. After applying to the Chinese authorities for a divorce, Li was shown into a room with a large bed on her fifth visit to Puyi. According to Li it was the leader of Puyi's ''unit'' who wanted to reform Puyi.

Li said of Emperor Puyi: ''As an emperor, he brought a lot of disaster to the Chinese people and became a collaborator. But as a human being, he also suffered a lot of pain and misery much heavier than the common people's."

Li officially divorced Puyi in 1957. She later married a technician named Huang Yugeng (黃毓庚), with whom she had two sons. During the Cultural Revolution, Li became a target for attack by the Red Guards because she used to be Puyi's concubine.

She died on 24 April 2001 at the age of 73 in Changchun after a six-year battle with cirrhosis.
