= Imperial Noble Consort Dunyi =

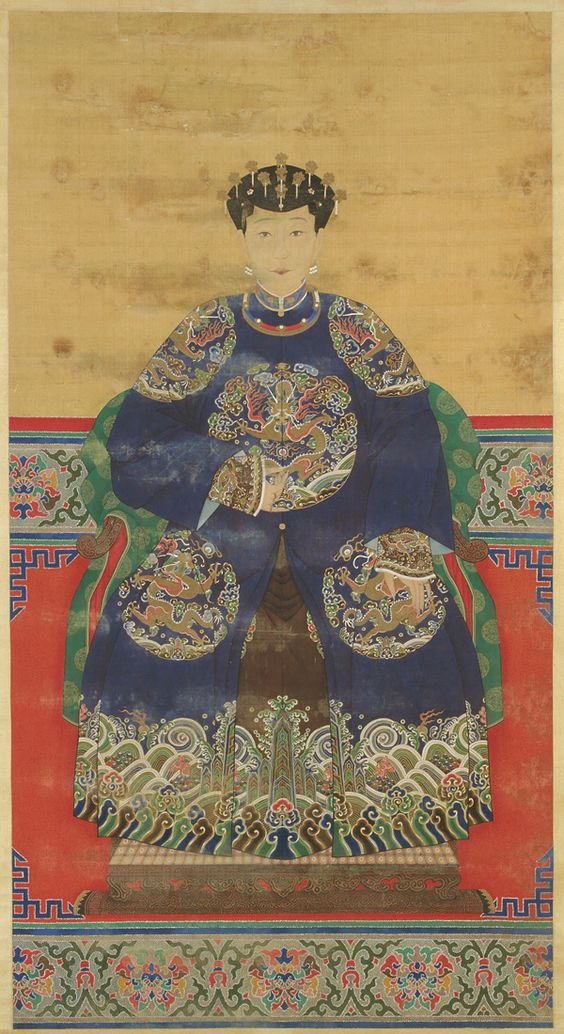
- Born: 3 December 1683
- Died: 30 April 1768 (aged 84); Jingfu Palace, Forbidden City, Beijing, Qing China
- Burial: Jing Mausoleum, Eastern Qing tombs
- Spouse: Kangxi Emperor
- House: Gūwalgiya (瓜爾佳; by birth); Aisin Gioro (by marriage)
- Father: Human (祜滿)

Imperial Noble Consort Dunyi (Chinese: 惇怡皇貴妃; 3 December 1683 – 30 April 1768), of the Manchu Plain White Banner Gūwalgiya clan, was a consort of the Kangxi Emperor of the Qing dynasty of China. She was 29 years his junior. She outlived Empress Xiaoxianchun, Empress Nara, and several other of the Qianlong Emperor's imperial consorts and children.

== Life ==
=== Family background ===
Imperial Noble Consort Dunyi's personal name is unknown, while her milk name was Hanjiuchun (旱九春).

- Father: Human (祜滿), served as third rank military official (三品協領)

=== Kangxi era ===
Сonsort He during Kangxi era

Lady Guwalgiya was born on 16th day of 10th lunar month of the 22nd year of Kangxi Emperor, which translates to 3 December 1683 in Gregorian calendar. In 1700, she entered Forbidden City at the age of seventeen, and was given the title of "Concubine He" (和嫔; "he" meaning "harmonious"). On 17 November 1701, she gave birth to the emperor's eighteenth daughter, who would die prematurely in the same month. In 1718, she was promoted to "Consort He" (和妃).

=== Yongzheng era ===
According to the tradition, each new emperor had to promote the imperial consorts of his predecessor. Lady Guwalgiya was promoted to "Dowager Noble Consort He" (和贵太妃) in 1722, but the promotion ceremony was held in July 1724.

=== Qianlong era ===
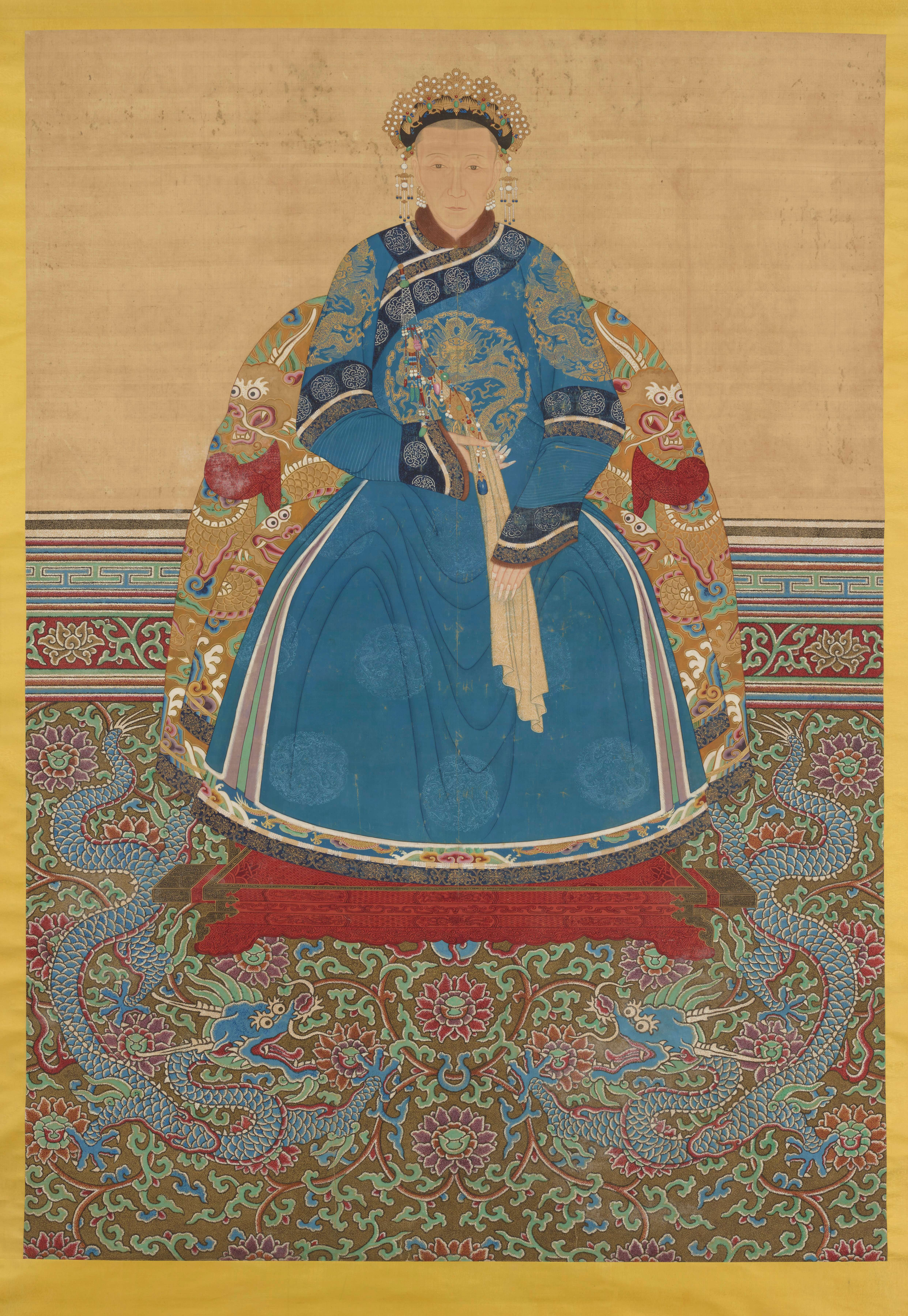
Imperial Noble Consort Dunyi in old age

In 1743, Lady Guwalgiya was promoted to "Grand Dowager Imperial Noble Consort Wenhui" (温惠皇贵太妃; "wenhui" meaning "tender and kind"). The Qianlong Emperor carried out two kneelings and six bows, during which she stood up and accepted the ceremony. Her residence in the Forbidden City was Jingfu Palace (景福宫; meaning "Palace of Happy Scenery"), one of the palaces in the area of Ningshou Palace, a former palace for empresses dowager. In 1763, Lady Guwalgiya celebrated her eightieth birthday. She received nine rolls of Wuling Baotou, five-colored satin with azurites, one metre of silk with 8 golden roundels of dragons, two metres of brocade, three bags of gold pieces, one metre of satin with golden "shou" characters, 18 metres of dajuan satin, nine metres of velvet, nine metres of dajuan muslin, nine metres of damask, nine metres of spring silk and nine metres of Puhuan crepe. She died at the age of eighty-six in Jingfu Palace on 30 April 1768. She was granted the posthumous title "Imperial Noble Consort Dunyi" (惇怡皇贵妃; "dunyi" meaning "honest and pleasant") in June 1768. She was the longest living consort of the Kangxi Emperor.

== Issue ==
- As Concubine He:
  - Unnamed daughter (17 November 1701 – November 1701), the Kangxi Emperor's 18th daughter

== Titles ==
- During the reign of the Kangxi Emperor (r. 1661–1722):
  - Lady Guwalgiya (瓜爾佳氏; from 3 December 1683)
  - Concubine He (和嫔; from 26 January 1701), fifth rank imperial consort
  - Consort He (和妃; from 28 December 1718), fourth rank imperial consort
- During the reign of the Yongzheng Emperor (r. 1722–1735):
  - Dowager Noble Consort He (和贵太妃; from 12 January 1723)
- During the reign of the Qianlong Emperor (r. 1735–1796):
  - Grand Dowager Imperial Noble Consort Wenhui (温惠皇贵太妃; from 23 August 1743)
  - Imperial Noble Consort Dunyi (惇怡皇贵妃; from May 1768)

== See also ==
- Imperial Chinese harem system#Qing
- Royal and noble ranks of the Qing dynasty
