= Huode Zhenjun Temple =

Taoist temple in Beijing, China

Coordinates: 39.93546°N 116.38936°E

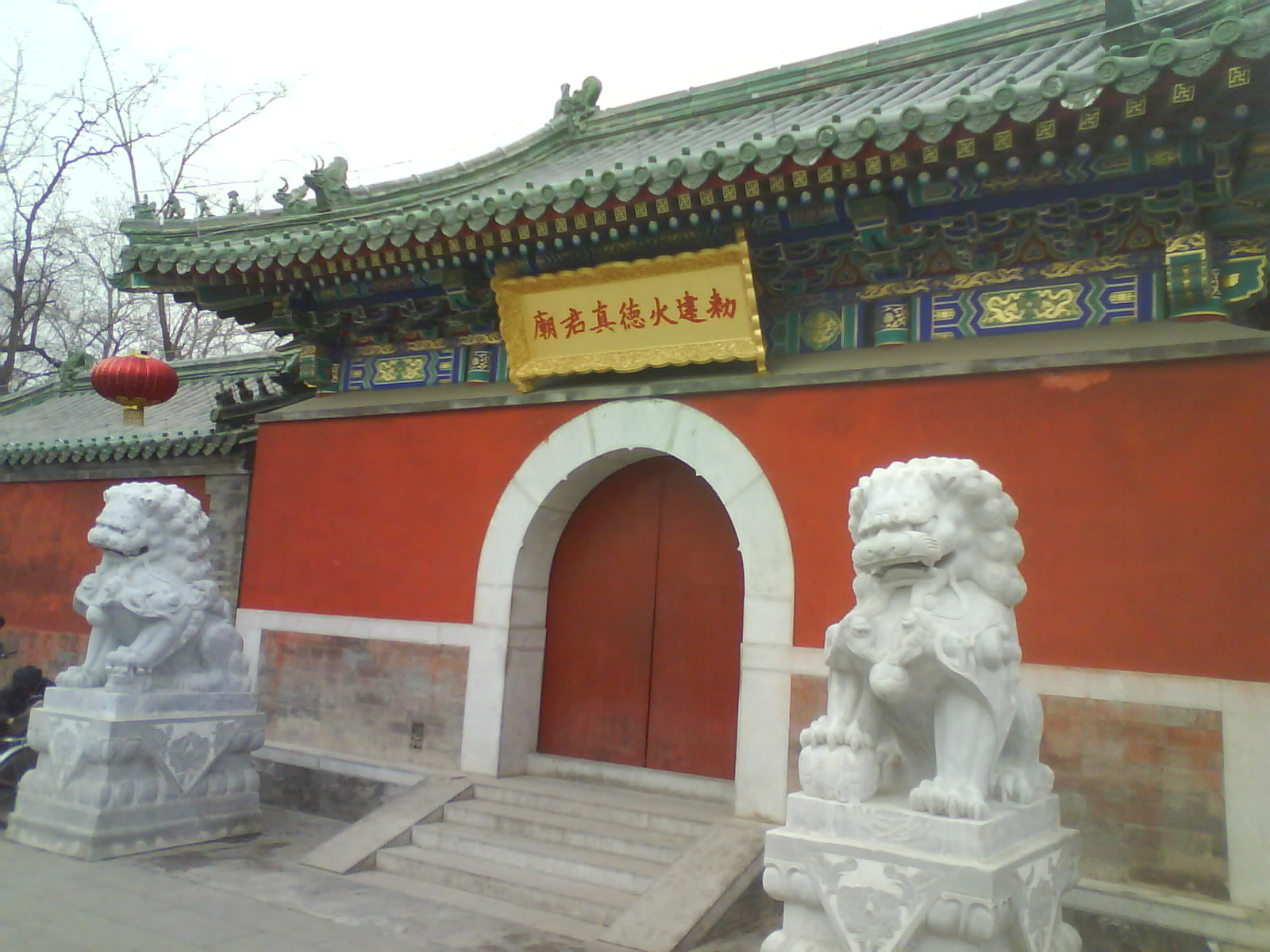
The Huode Zhenjun Temple

The Huode Zhenjun Temple (火德真君庙), also known as the Fire God Temple, located near the Shichahai in central Beijing, is a prominent Taoist temple of the city.

First built during the Ming Dynasty and then rebuilt in 1759 during the Qing Dynasty, the temple is known for one of its gate, which boasts its yellow colored glaze tiles that were granted by the Emperor.
