= Zaifeng, Prince Chun =

Regent of China from 1908 to 1911

Zaifeng
- Prince Chun of the First Rank
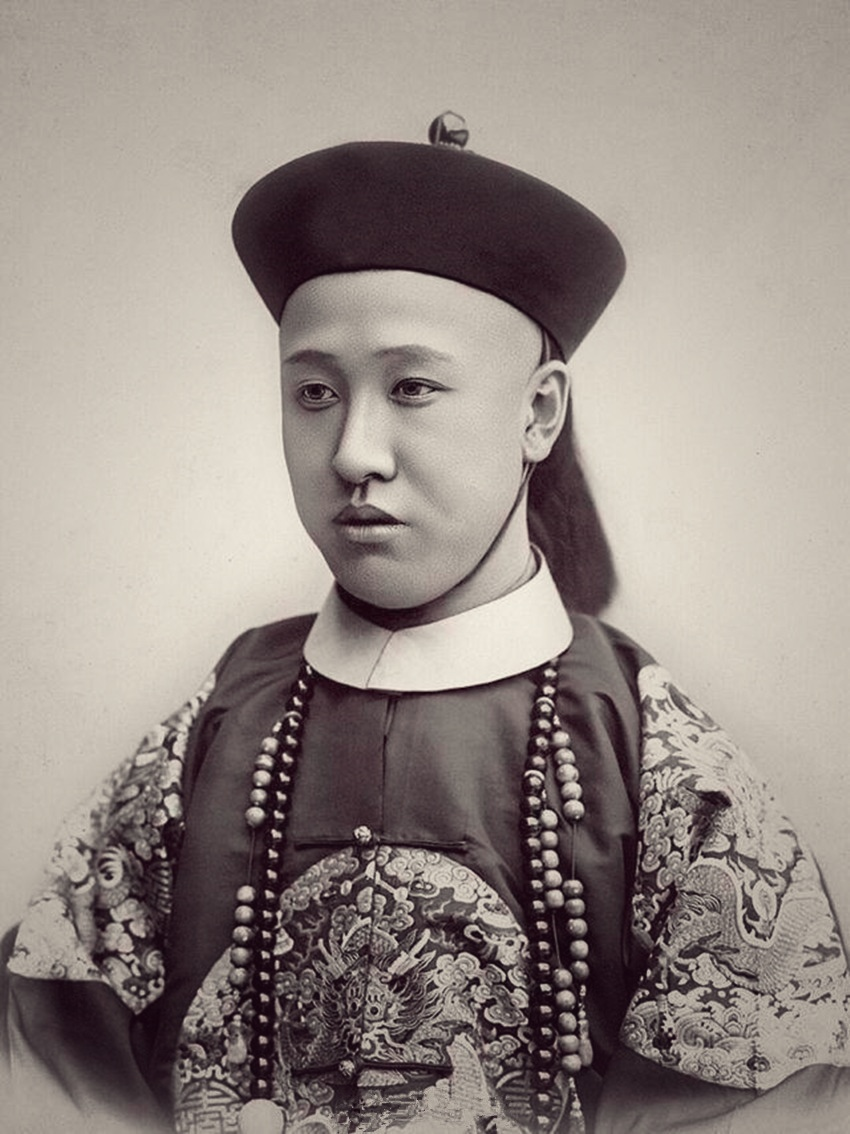

Prince Chun of the First Rank
- Tenure: 1 January 1891 – 17 August 1945
- Predecessor: Yixuan
- Successor: peerage abolished

Prince regent of the Qing dynasty
- Tenure: 2 December 1908 – 6 December 1911
- Successor: Position abolished
- Monarch: Xuantong Emperor

Grand Councilor of the Qing dynasty
- Tenure: 19 June 1907 – 14 November 1908
- Monarch: Guangxu Emperor
- Born: Aisin Gioro Zaifeng (愛新覺羅·載灃); 12 February 1883 (光緒九年 正月 五日); Prince Chun Mansion, Peking, Great Qing
- Died: 3 February 1951 (aged 67); Beijing, People's Republic of China
- Burial: Futian Cemetery
- Consorts: Gūwalgiya Youlan (m. 1902; died 1921) Lady Denggiya, secondary consort
- Issue: Xuantong Emperor; Pujie; Puren; Yunying; Yunhe; Yunying; Yunxian; Yunxin; Yunyu; Yunhuan
Names
- Aisin Gioro Zaifeng (愛新覺羅·載灃); Manchu: Dzai feng (ᡯᠠᡳ ᡶᡝᠩ)
- House: Aisin Gioro
- Father: Yixuan, Prince Chunxian of the First Rank
- Mother: Liugiya Cuiyan

Zaifeng
- Traditional Chinese: 載灃
- Simplified Chinese: 载沣
Transcriptions
Standard Mandarin
- Hanyu Pinyin: Zàifēng
- Wade–Giles: Tsai^{4} Fêng^{1}

Prince Chun
- Traditional Chinese: 醇親王
- Simplified Chinese: 醇亲王
Transcriptions
Standard Mandarin
- Hanyu Pinyin: Chún Qīnwáng
- Wade–Giles: Ch'un^{2} Ch'in^{1}-wang^{2}

Zaifeng (12 February 1883 – 3 February 1951), also known as Tsai Feng, Prince of Ch'ün, formally known by his title Prince Chun, was a Manchu prince and regent of the late Qing dynasty. He was a son of Yixuan, the seventh son of the Daoguang Emperor, and the father of Puyi, the Last Emperor. He served as prince regent from 1908 to 1911 during the reign of his son until the Qing dynasty was overthrown by the Xinhai Revolution in 1911.

== Family background ==
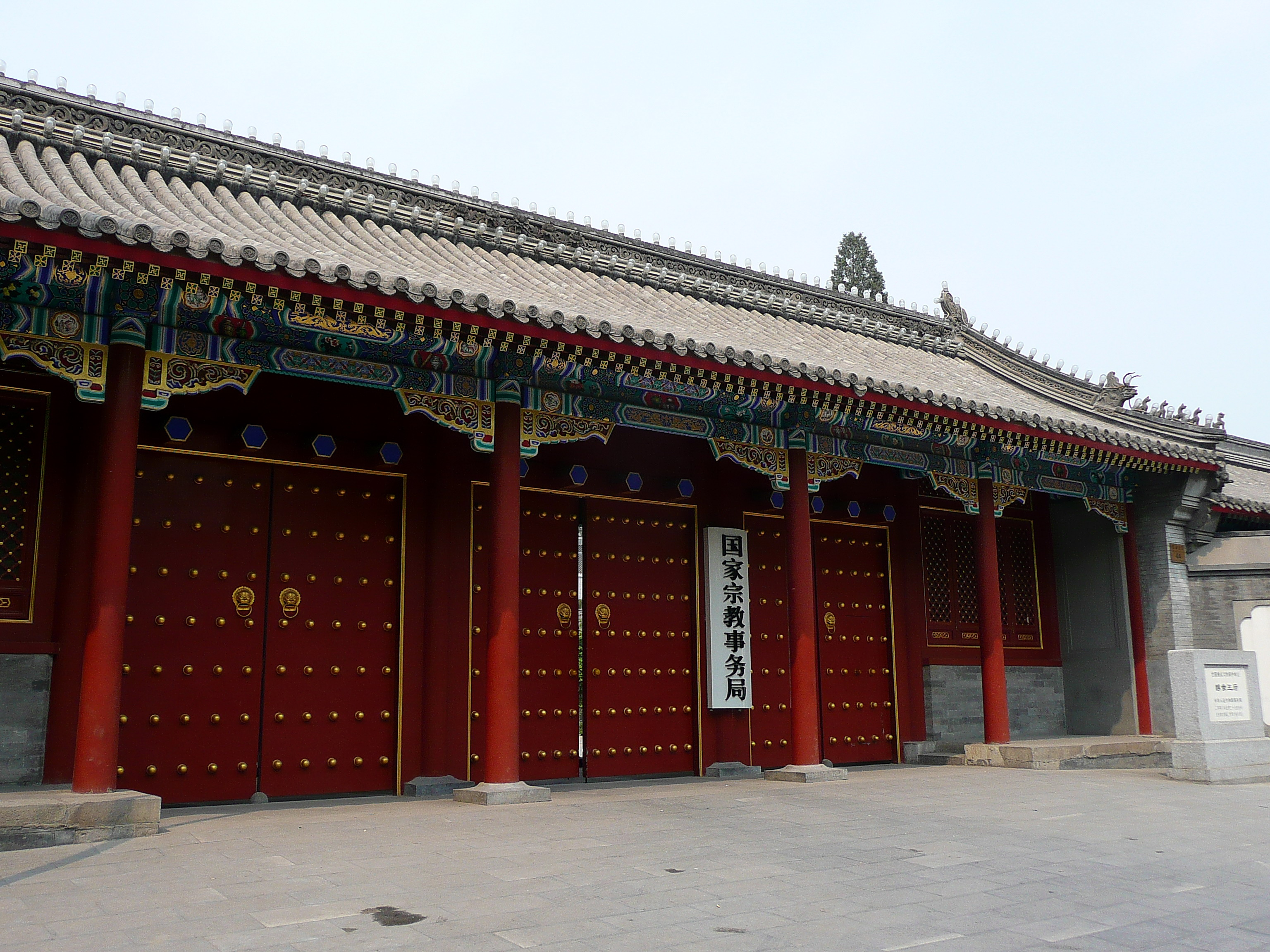
Prince Chun's Mansion in present Beijing

Zaifeng was born on 12 February of the 9th year of the Guangxu Emperor in the Aisin Gioro clan as the fifth son of Yixuan (Prince Chun). He was the second of Prince Chun's sons who survived into adulthood. His mother was Liugiya Cuiyan, who was a maid in Prince Chun's residence before becoming one of the prince's concubines. Born to a Han bannerman family, her family name was "Liu" (劉) but was later changed to the Manchu-sounding "Liugiya" (劉佳) after she married Prince Chun and was transferred to a Manchu banner.

In 1875, after the childless Tongzhi Emperor's death, Zaifeng's elder half-brother, Zaitian was selected by the Empress Dowagers Cixi and Ci'an to be the new emperor. Zaitian was "adopted" by the empress dowagers as their son, which meant he was no longer nominally Prince Chun's son. He was then enthroned as the Guangxu Emperor. Prince Chun, as the biological father of the reigning emperor, received the highest accolades as well as high rank in the imperial court. In addition, he also had a close relationship with Empress Dowager Cixi, and his primary consort, Yehenara Wanzhen, was one of Cixi's sisters. In January 1891, after Prince Chun's death, an eight-year-old Zaifeng immediately inherited his father's princely title and became the second Prince Chun.

In 1900, during the Boxer Rebellion, when the armies of the Eight-Nation Alliance occupied Beijing, Prince Chun's fiancée reportedly committed suicide to prevent herself from being raped and humiliated by the foreign invaders.

== Life in the government ==
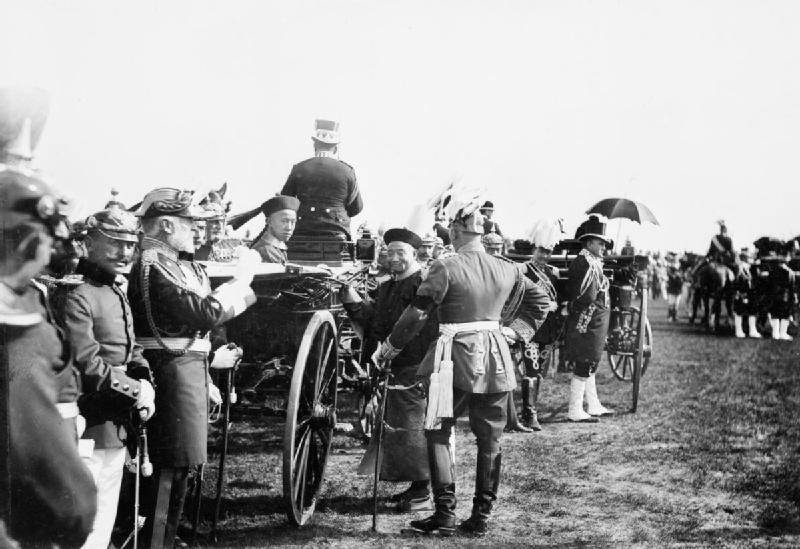
Prince Chun went to Germany to apologize for the incident of von Ketteler, after that, he inspected the maneuver of Imperial German Army in Potsdam

Around late February or early March 1901, Prince Chun was appointed as an army inspector by the Qing imperial court, which had moved to Xi'an after evacuating Beijing. In June 1901, at the insistence of the foreign powers, the 18-year-old Prince Chun was appointed by as a Special Ambassador to offer regrets on behalf of the Qing government to Germany for the murder of German diplomat Baron von Ketteler. In July, Prince Chun left for Germany by sea and met Kaiser Wilhelm II in Potsdam in September. Although he first planned to subsequently tour around Europe and visit Belgium and London, he had to cancel his plans and return to China prematurely because of health issues of Empress Dowager Cixi.

Empress Dowager Cixi was pleased with how Prince Chun executed his diplomatic mission in Germany. He allegedly refused to kneel in front of the Kaiser even when the Germans insisted; the diplomatic slight was forgiven thanks to the negotiation skills of his adviser, Liang Cheng. During his time in Germany, Prince Chun also attended troop inspections with the Kaiser and his brother Prince Heinrich.

Due to his success, Prince Chun was subsequently given several key appointments over the following years. At the same time, Cixi grew wary of Prince Chun because the latter was a favorite of foreign powers. In fact, one reason why Prince Chun took up so many important positions in the imperial court after 1901 was that he was a protégé of the foreign powers, which Cixi was careful not to displease. However, she was as intent as ever on thwarting any challenge to her power, and so Prince Chun clearly posed a problem for her. Cixi saw an opportunity in 1902 on Prince Chun's return from Germany – she ordered him to marry Youlan, the daughter of Ronglu, a conservative politician in the imperial court and a staunch supporter of Cixi. Prince Chun loathed Ronglu because the latter played a leading role in ending the Hundred Days' Reform in 1898, and in the subsequent internment of the Guangxu Emperor. However, he still agreed to marry Ronglu's daughter because he felt it was unwise to oppose Cixi. The marriage between Prince Chun and Youlan was an unhappy one. With Prince Chun now firmly tied to her, Cixi no longer viewed him as a threat. When Prince Chun and Youlan's first son, Puyi, was born in 1906, Puyi became a likely heir to the throne. Prince Chun and Youlan had another son, Pujie, and three daughters – Yunying, Yunhe and Yunying.

== Regency ==
The Guangxu Emperor died on 14 November 1908. On the same day, Empress Dowager Cixi issued an imperial edict proclaiming Prince Chun's eldest son, Puyi, as the successor. Puyi was "adopted" as the Guangxu Emperor's son; like the Guangxu Emperor before him, he was no longer nominally his biological father's son. Prince Chun was appointed Prince-Regent to assist the new emperor. Cixi died the following day, ending her 47-year-long control over China, while Prince Chun ruled as regent for the next three years. Prince Chun's first concern was to punish the Beiyang Army general Yuan Shikai, who had betrayed the Guangxu Emperor and supported Ronglu in putting an end to the Hundred Days' Reform in 1898. Prince Chun was prevented from executing his plan of having Yuan Shikai assassinated, but managed to have Yuan dismissed from office and sent home to Henan on an excuse of "curing his foot disease".

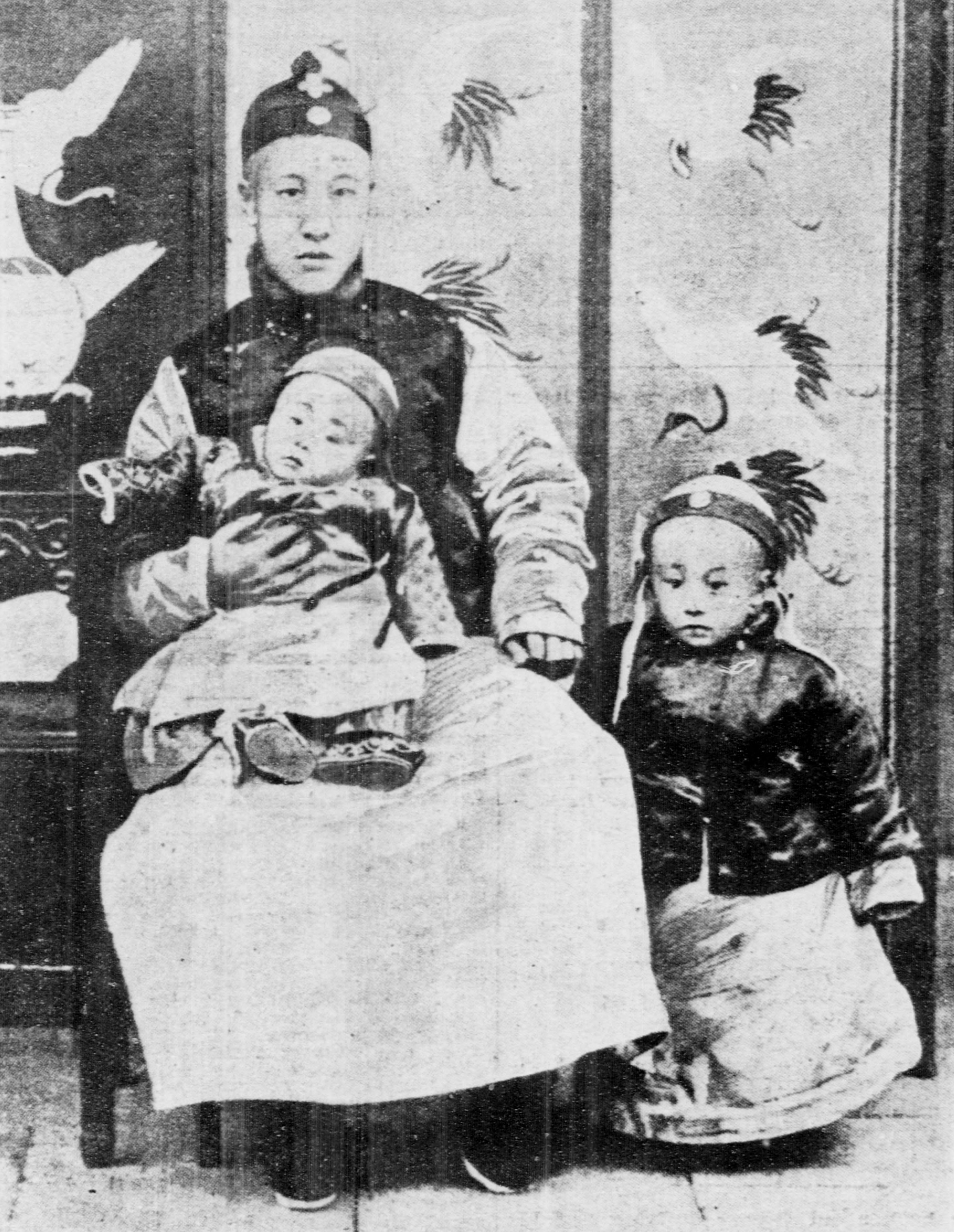
Puyi, Emperor of China (standing); his father, Prince Chun, regent and controller of the nation, and his younger brother Pujie in 1909

Over the next three years from 1909 to 1911, Prince Chun carried out the economic and political reforms that were initiated after the Boxer Rebellion ended in 1901, but he was torn between the conservative (mainly Manchu officials) and reformist (mostly Han Chinese officials) factions in the imperial court. The inexperienced Prince Chun concentrated more power in the hands of a small ruling court which angered bureaucrats on lower levels. He promised a constitution by 1916 with preparatory stages in between. Beginning on 5 February 1909, China held its first provincial assembly and local council elections (a council election was held in Tianjin as early as 1907). 21 provincial assemblies took their seats on 14 October. The vast majority elected were constitutional monarchists with a few crypto-revolutionaries and they turned the assemblies into hotbeds of dissent. Alarmed, the National Assembly, which convened in Beijing on 3 October 1910, had half of its 200 members appointed to balance the other half elected by the provincial assemblies. The provinces sent 98 members to the capital since Xinjiang, the 22nd province, had yet to hold elections to form an assembly due to its extreme underdevelopment. Prince Chun only appointed 96 members. Nevertheless, it was the elected members that dominated the floor and wooed the appointed ones to their side. The National Assembly urged Prince Chun to speed up the constitutional process and create a true parliament so the prince responded by pushing forth the expected deadline to 1913.

The Grand Council was replaced by an Imperial Cabinet led by Prince Qing on 8 May 1911. It dismayed constitutionalists as the Imperial Cabinet was not responsible to the National Assembly and contained seven Manchu imperial kinsmen with only four Han Chinese among its 13 members, breaking a long-standing policy of appointing equal numbers of both ethnicity. More power was concentrated in the hands of the Manchu minority than at any time since the dynasty's early years. The following day, the government announced that it would nationalize major railroads, a policy which infuriated many businessmen who invested heavily in railways. They were told that they would be compensated with only a portion of the amount they invested. This alienated many bourgeois and gentry, who started the Railway Protection Movement as a means of opposition while themselves becoming disposed towards revolution.

The period saw the revolutionaries attempting several insurrections to overthrow the Qing dynasty, and there was even one attempt by Wang Jingwei to assassinate Prince Chun in February 1910. Prince Chun did not have the maneuvering talent nor the lust for power of Empress Dowager Cixi, and he proved often indecisive and probably unfit for this troubled period.

In 1910, Prince Chun ousted from Tibet the 13th Dalai Lama, who would not return from India until 1913, whereupon the Dalai Lama declared Tibet independent.

On 10 October 1911, the Wuchang Uprising marked the start of the Xinhai Revolution, which aimed to topple the Qing dynasty and end imperial rule in China. The Qing imperial court was forced to recall back Yuan Shikai, despite Prince Chun's deep aversion for him, as Yuan was the only one capable of suppressing the revolution. Yuan became Prime Minister of the Imperial Cabinet on 16 November. Prince Chun, now deprived of any real power, stepped down on 6 December 1911, and was replaced by his sister-in-law, Empress Dowager Longyu, as regent. When he returned home that day, he told his family, "Now I am back in the family, and I can finally care for my children". The three years of regency were certainly the most painful years in Prince Chun's life; he never relished power the way Empress Dowager Cixi or Yuan Shikai did, and witnesses say he felt relieved when he left office.

Sir Reginald Johnston, tutor to Puyi, said that upon the Prince's appointment as regent it was already common knowledge that he was incapable of the enormous task ahead of him. He states Chun was:

...A man of some amiable qualities, free from malice or vindictiveness, sociable, as interested in the Chinese drama as he is uninterested in politics or affairs of the great world ... He is well-intentioned, tries hard in his languid and ineffectual way to please everyone, succeeds in pleasing no one, shrinks from responsibility, is thoroughly unbusinesslike, is disastrously deficient in energy, will-power and grit, and there is reason to believe that he lacks both physical and moral courage. He is helpless in an emergency, has no original ideas, and is liable to be swayed by any smooth talker. After he became regent, however, the flattery of sycophants tended to make him obstinantly tenacious of his own opinions, which invariably turned out to be wrong.

== Life after the Qing dynasty ==
Even after returning to private life, Prince Chun remained a respected figure, among both the Nationalist and later the Communist parties, who appreciated his peaceful stepping down from power and acceptance of China becoming a republic. Sun Yat-sen even visited him in Beijing in September 1912, during which he congratulated Prince Chun, and the latter formally declared his support for the Republic of China.

After the death of Empress Dowager Longyu in 1913, Prince Chun was put in charge of the small imperial court that remained around his son Puyi (no longer a ruling emperor), and he managed all the court's affairs until 1924 when Puyi was expelled from the Forbidden City. In 1917, when Puyi was briefly restored on the throne by the warlord Zhang Xun, Prince Chun played no significant role, as Zhang Xun's slogan for the restoration was "Do not allow the relatives of the emperor to participate in the government".

Prince Chun lived in the Northern Residence in Beijing until 1928. He spent most of his time in the library reading books on history and newly published magazines. Sometime after 1911, he married another wife, Lady Denggiya, with whom he had several children. His primary consort, Youlan, committed suicide in 1921 by swallowing opium after being publicly scolded by Dowager Consort Duankang (the highest-ranked woman in the imperial court after Empress Dowager Longyu's death in 1913) for the misconduct of her son, Puyi.

In 1928, Prince Chun moved to Tianjin, where he lived in the British and Japanese concessions. In August 1939, he relocated back to the Northern Residence in Beijing when Tianjin was flooded. During the Second Sino-Japanese War, Prince Chun was against the establishment of the Japanese puppet state of Manchukuo, and warned Puyi not to be involved. However, Puyi ignored his advice and was installed by the Japanese as the puppet figurehead ruler of Manchukuo. Prince Chun visited his son thrice in Manchukuo but ostensibly refused to participate in state affairs. Puyi wanted his father to live in Manchukuo but his father refused and returned to Beijing on an excuse that he was ill. At the end of the Second Sino-Japanese War, when the National Revolutionary Army recovered Beijing from the Japanese, a letter of sympathy was sent to Prince Chun by the Beijing Municipality in recognition of his attitude during the Japanese occupation.

After the end of the Chinese Civil War and with the 1949 proclamation of the People's Republic of China by Mao Zedong, Prince Chun was held in high regard by members of the Chinese Communist Party. However, his son Puyi was arrested and imprisoned for ten years. Prince Chun sold the Northern Residence to the government out of financial difficulties. He also donated his library and art collection to Peking University, and provided relief aid to the victims of the Huai River flooding in 1950.

Prince Chun died on 3 February 1951 in Beijing. Many of his descendants have resided or reside in Beijing to this day, including Jin Youzhi, Jin Yuzhang and Jin Yulan. Many have changed their Manchu clan name Aisin Gioro to a Chinese family name Jin (金), which means "gold" ("Aisin" also means "gold" in Manchu).

Styles of Zaifeng, Prince Chun
- Reference style: His Imperial Highness
- Spoken style: Your Imperial Highness
- Alternative style: Prince Chun/Prince Regent

== Names and titles ==
- Names:
  - Clan name / family name: Aisin Gioro (simplified Chinese: 爱新觉罗; traditional Chinese: 愛新覺羅; pinyin: Àixīnjuéluó)
  - Personal name: Zaifeng (simplified Chinese: 载沣; traditional Chinese: 載灃; pinyin: Zǎifēng; Wade–Giles: Tsai-feng)
  - Courtesy name: Bohan (Chinese: 伯涵; pinyin: Bóhán) or Yiyun (simplified Chinese: 亦云; traditional Chinese: 亦雲; pinyin: Yìyún)
  - Pseudonym: Jingyun (simplified Chinese: 静云; traditional Chinese: 靜雲; pinyin: Jìngyún; lit. 'Silent Cloud'). In his older days he chose a new pseudonym Shupi (simplified Chinese: 书癖; traditional Chinese: 書癖; pinyin: Shūpǐ; lit. 'Book Enthusiast').
- Titles:
  - Prince Chun of the First Rank (simplified Chinese: 醇亲王; traditional Chinese: 醇親王; pinyin: Chún Qīnwáng), simplified to Prince Chun (or Prince Ch'un in Wade–Giles). Zaifeng held this title from 1891 until the fall of the Qing Dynasty in 1911.
  - Prince-Regent (simplified Chinese: 摄政王; traditional Chinese: 攝政王; pinyin: Shèzhèng Wáng)
- Other references:
  - Zai Jingyun (simplified Chinese: 载静云; traditional Chinese: 載靜雲; pinyin: Zǎi Jìngyún)

== Family ==
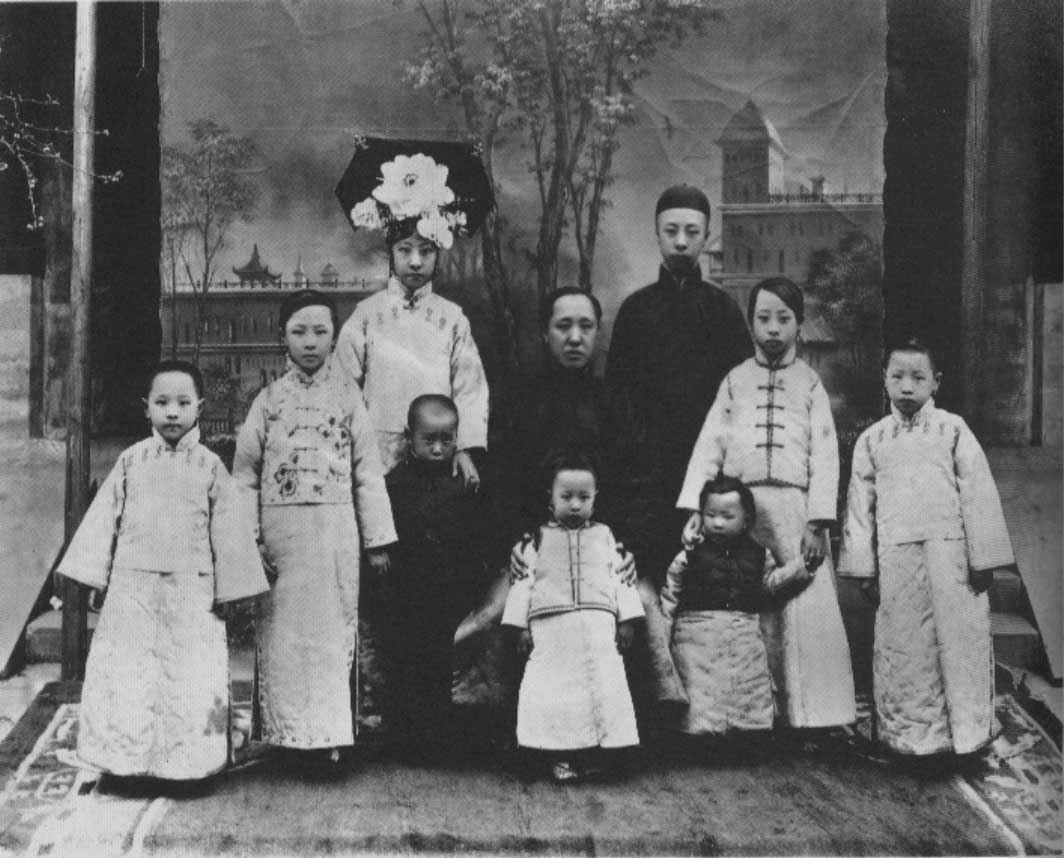
From top to bottom, left to right: Yunying, Zaifeng, Pujie, Yunxin, Yunying, Puren, Yunyu, Yunhuan, Yunhe and Yunxian; circa 1923

Primary Consort

- Youlan, Imperial Princess Consort Chun of the Gūwalgiya clan (亲王福晋 瓜爾佳氏; 1884 – 30 September 1921), sixth cousin five times removed
  - Puyi, the Xuantong Emperor (宣統皇帝 溥儀; 7 February 1906 – 17 October 1967), first son
  - Pujie (溥傑; 16 April 1907 – 28 February 1994), second son
  - First daughter (1909–1925), personal name Yunying (韞瑛)
    - Married Runliang (潤良; 1904–1925) of the Daur Gobulo (郭布羅) clan
  - Second daughter (1911–2001), personal name Yunhe (韞和)
    - Married Zheng Guangyuan (鄭廣元), and had issue (one son, three daughters)
  - Third daughter (1913–1992), personal name Yunying (韞穎)
    - Married Runqi (潤麒; 1912–2007) of the Daur Gobulo (郭布羅) clan in 1931, and had issue (two sons, one daughter)

Secondary Consort

- Secondary consort, of the Denggiya clan (側福晉 鄧佳氏; 1896–1942)
  - Fourth daughter (1914–2003), personal name Yunxian (韞嫻)
    - Married Qifan (琪璠) of the Harqin (喀喇沁) Zhao (趙) clan, and had issue (one son, one daughter)
  - Puqi (溥倛; 14 October 1916 – 25 September 1918), third son
  - Fifth daughter (1917–1998), personal name Yunxin (韞馨)
    - Married Wan Jiaxi (萬嘉熙), and had issue (three sons, one daughter)
  - Puren (溥任; 21 September 1918 – 10 April 2015), fourth son
  - Sixth daughter (1919–1982), personal name Yunyu (韞娛)
    - Married Ailan (愛蘭; 1921–2005) of the Manchu Wang clan in 1943, and had issue (one son, four daughters)
  - Seventh daughter (11 September 1921 – 9 August 2004), personal name Yunhuan (韞歡)
    - Married Qiao Hongzhi (喬宏志; 1919–1960) on 12 February 1950, and had issue (two sons, one daughter)

== See also ==
- Royal and noble ranks of the Qing dynasty
- Ranks of imperial consorts in China#Qing

Zaifeng, Prince Chun Qing dynasty Born: 12 February 1883 Died: 3 February 1951
Chinese nobility
Preceded by Yixuan	Prince Chun; 1891–1911	Title abolished
