= Former residence of Soong Ching-ling =

Building in Prince Chun Mansion, China

Coordinates: 39.9454°N 116.3831°E

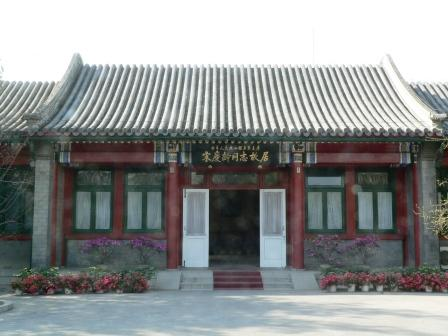
Residence exterior

The former residence of Soong Ching Ling (simplified Chinese: 宋庆龄故居; traditional Chinese: 宋慶齡故居; pinyin: Sòng Qìnglíng Gùjū) is a museum in the Shichahai area of Beijing, China, and once was the last residence of Soong Ching-ling, the wife of Sun Yat-sen and later vice-president and Honorary President of China in 1981. The museum opened in 1982, while it was listed as a National Key Cultural Relic Protection Unit. It was renovated in 2009, and is dedicated to her memory.

== History ==
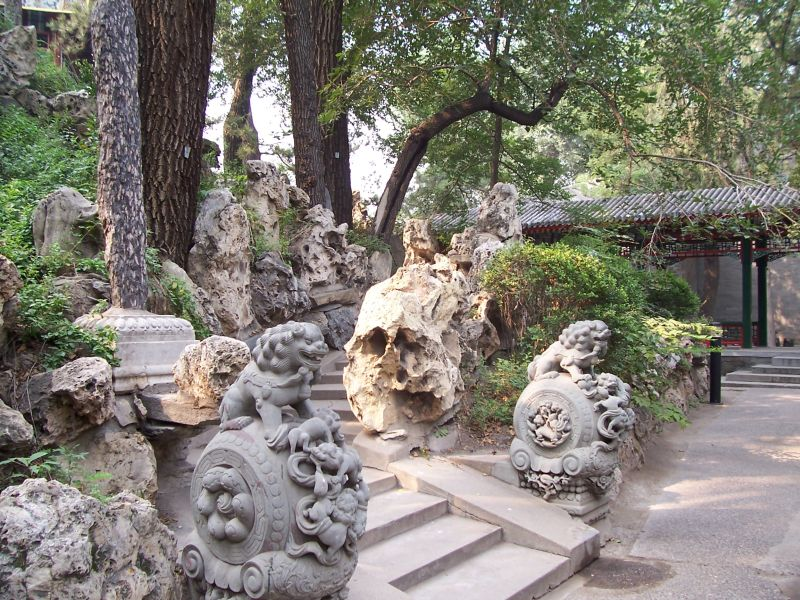
Gardens

The site of Soong Ching Ling's former residence was the mansion of Nalan Mingzhu during the Qing Dynasty. During the Qianlong period, Nalan Mingzhu's grandson, Xian'an, was copied out of all his family's assets because of his resistance to powerful ministers, and part of the property was once occupied by Heshen as a private residence. In 1791, Qianlong Emperor allocated 53,000 taels of silver to build a garden adjacent to the property for his eleventh son, Prince Cheng Yongxing. In 1799, all of Heshen's assets were confiscated, and the compound was given to Yongxing by Jiaqing Emperor. In 1888, Prince Cheng Yongxing's descendants were demoted due to hereditary succession and lost their eligibility to reside in the royal residence, and since the original Prince Consort's residence had become a "subterranean residence". In 1888, Prince Cheng's residence became the "Residence of the Submerged Dragon", and the former Cheng Prince's Mansion was given to Yixuan, Prince Chun by Empress Dowager Cixi.

In 1912, the Republic of China was founded, and according to the Conditions of Preferential Treatment for the Qing Family issued by the Beiyang Government, the property rights of the Prince Chun's Mansion belonged to Prince Chun Zaifeng. A Greek captain added a two-story mansion in the 1920s. In 1924, the main courtyard of the Mansion was expropriated by the Beiyang Government, and Zaifeng moved to the inner residence and the garden section. In 1949, Zaifeng sold the royal residence to the Higher Industrial School affiliated to the Ministry of Heavy Industry of the Central People's Government.

In 1962, a two-story antique residential building designed by the Beijing Architectural Design Institute and constructed by the Beijing No. 5 Architectural Engineering Co. in the garden of the Prince's residence was formally completed, and the rest of the buildings in the garden were renovated. In 1963, Soong Ching-ling moved to this residence. The entire garden was transformed into Song Qingling's residence in Beijing, and the theater in the garden was dismantled and converted into a lawn.

On May 29, 1981, after the death of Soong Ching Ling, the large living room and dining room converted from the former front hall "Hao Liang Fun" and the back hall "Chang Lai Zhai" were set up as a showroom of the residence to introduce the life of Soong Ching Ling. In October 1981, the residence was officially named the Former Residence of Comrade Soong Ching Ling, Honorary President of the People's Republic of China. On February 23, 1982, the Former Residence of Soong Ching Ling in Beijing was listed as a National Key Cultural Relic Protection Unit, and on May 29 of that year, the "Exhibition of Comrade Soong Ching Ling's Life" was held, with Deng Yingchao personally presenting the exhibition. In 1992, the former residence of Soong Ching Ling was named the "Patriotic Educational Base for Beijing Youth" by the Beijing Municipal People's Government.

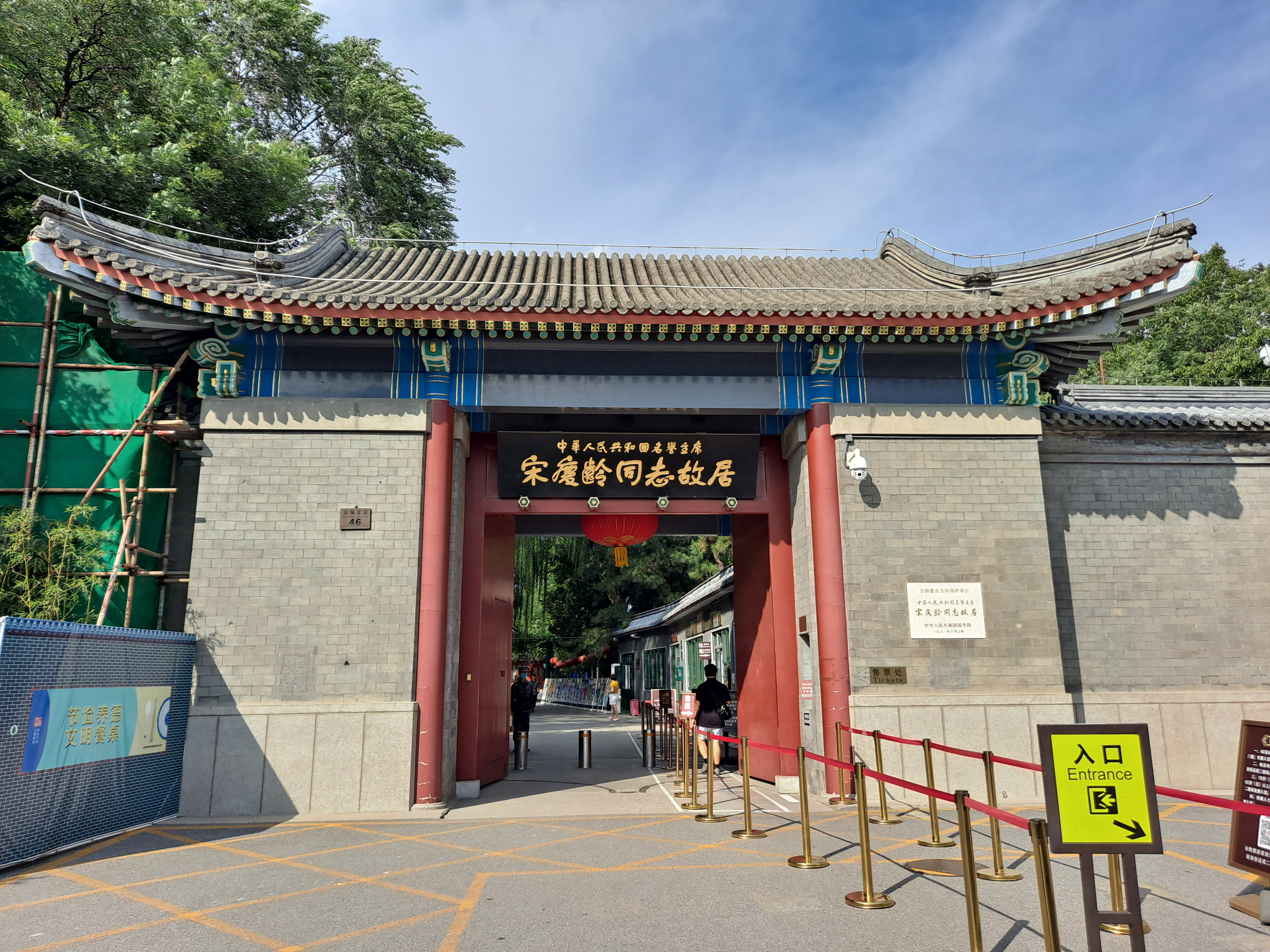
Restored Former Residence of Soong Ching-ling in 2023

On May 29, 2007, the foundation stone was laid for the construction of the cultural relics library of the former residence of Soong Ching Ling, which was opened to the public at the same time as the completed restoration of the residence on May 31, 2009. Jia Qinglin, member of the Politburo Standing Committee of the Chinese Communist Party (CCP) the CCP Central Committee, and Chairman of the National Committee of the Chinese People's Political Consultative Conference, attended.

== Exhibits ==
The former residence of Soong Ching Ling is located at No. 46, Houhai Beiyan, Xicheng District, Beijing, People's Republic of China, covering an area of 20,000 square meters, with a building area of 5,000 square meters. The mansion shows exhibits that relate to Soong's life. Documents and photographs show her childhood, student years, marriage, and political activities as interpreted through the official view. Another exhibit depicts her life and her decision to support the communist cause. Her love of the children of China is represented by another exhibit. The compound also contains her living quarters that include a number of rooms with the personal furniture and appointments as used by Soong such as her study, dining room and bedroom.

Since its inception the museum has been visited by more than 3.5 million people (2010).

== Other residencies ==
Soong's former residence in Shanghai has been also converted into a museum in her memory named Soong Ching Ling Memorial Residence.

== See also ==
- Tomb of Soong Ching-ling
- Prince Gong Mansion
- Prince Chun Mansion
