= Prince Chun (created 1872) =

Qing dynasty princely peerage

Prince Chun of the First Rank
- Traditional Chinese: 和碩醇親王
- Simplified Chinese: 和硕醇亲王
Transcriptions
Standard Mandarin
- Hanyu Pinyin: héshuò chún qīnwáng
- Wade–Giles: ho^{2}-shuo^{4} ch'un^{2} ch'in^{1}-wang^{2}

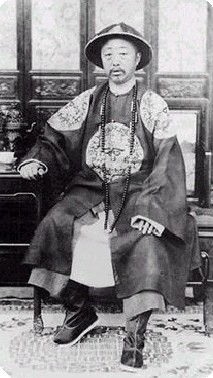
Yixuan (1840–1891), the first Prince Chun

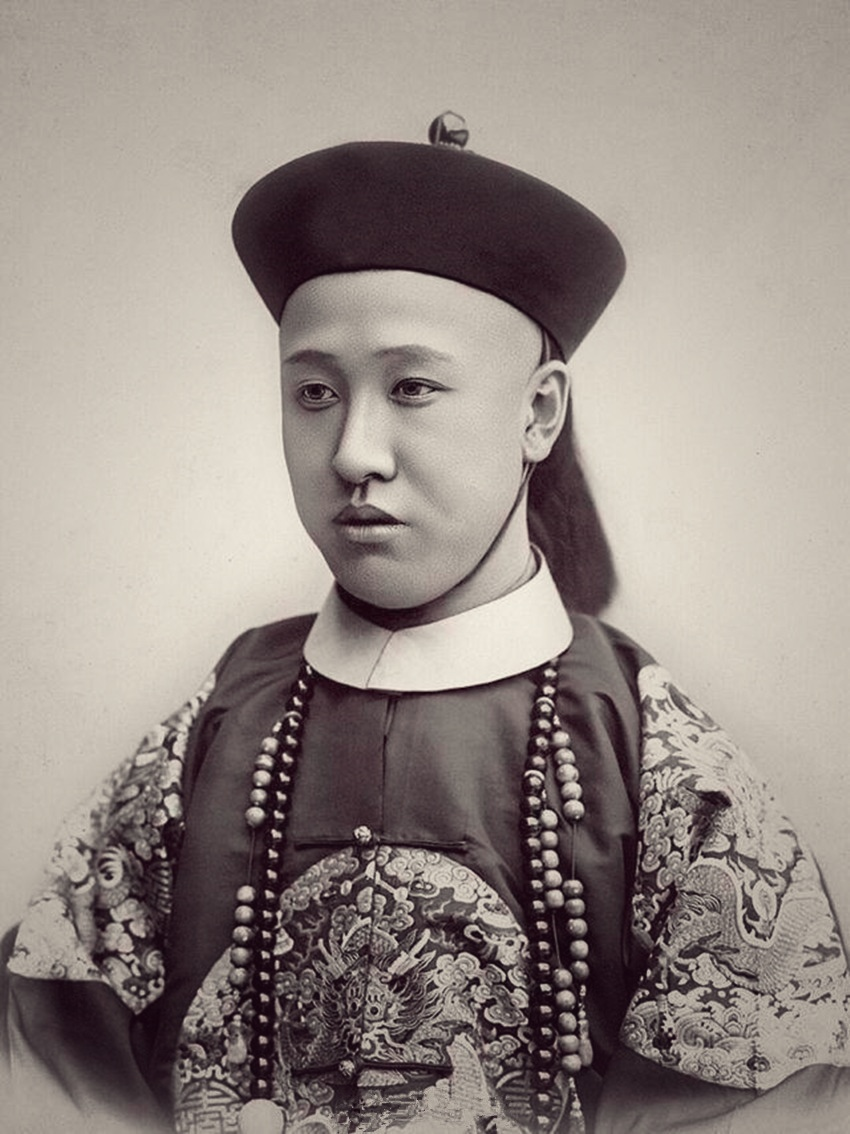
Zaifeng (1883–1951), the second Prince Chun

Prince Chun of the First Rank, or simply Prince Chun, was the title of a princely peerage used in China during the Manchu-led Qing dynasty (1644–1912). It was also one of the 12 "iron-cap" princely peerages in the Qing dynasty, which meant that the title could be passed down without being downgraded.

The first bearer of the title was Yixuan (1840–1891), the seventh son of the Daoguang Emperor. He was awarded the title by his fourth brother, the Xianfeng Emperor, who succeeded their father. The title was passed down over two generations and held by only two persons – Yixuan and his fifth son, Zaifeng (1883–1951) – who were the biological fathers of the penultimate and last emperors of the Qing dynasty respectively.

== Members of the Prince Chun peerage ==
- Yixuan (1840–1891), the Daoguang Emperor's seventh son, initially a junwang (second-rank prince) from 1850 to 1864, accorded qinwang (first-rank prince) status in 1864 and given a qinwang title in 1872. In 1874, his title, Prince Chun of the First Rank, was made hereditary. He was posthumously honoured as Prince Chunxian of the First Rank (醇賢親王).
  - Zaiguang (載洸; 1880–1884), Yixuan's fourth son, had no male heir
  - Zaifeng (1883–1951), Yixuan's fifth son, initially a buru bafen zhenguo gong from 1884 to 1891, held the title Prince Chun of the First Rank from 1891 to 1949
  - Zaixun (1885–1949), Yixuan's sixth son, held a buru bafen fuguo gong title from 1887 to 1889 and a feng'en fuguo gong title from 1889 to 1902, adopted as Yizhi (Prince Rui)'s son
  - Zaitao (1887–1970), Yixuan's seventh son, held a second class zhenguo jiangjun title from 1890 to 1893, adopted as Yihe (Prince Zhong)'s son

== Family tree ==
Yixuan 奕譞 (1840–1891); Prince Chunxian 醇賢親王 (1872–1891)	Wanzhen 婉貞 (1841–1896) (Yixuan's wife)	Lady Yanzha 顏扎氏 (Yixuan's first concubine)	Lady Liugiya 劉佳氏 (Yixuan's second concubine)	Lady Ligiya 李佳氏 (Yixuan's third concubine)
Zaihan 載瀚 (1865–1866)	Zaitian 載湉 (1871–1908); Guangxu Emperor 光緒帝 (1875–1908)	Yixuan's third son (unnamed)	Zaiguang 載洸 (1880–1884)	Yixuan's first daughter (1861–1866) (name unknown)	Yixuan's third daughter (name unknown)
Lady Denggiya 鄧佳氏 (Zaifeng's concubine)	Youlan 幼蘭 (1884–1921) (Zaifeng's wife)	Zaifeng 載灃 (1883–1951); Prince Chun 醇親王 (1891–1949)	Zaixun 載洵 (1885–1949); Beile 貝勒 (1902–1949)	Zaitao 載濤 (1887–1970); Beile 貝勒 (1900–1945)	Yixuan's second daughter (name unknown)
Puyi 溥儀 (1906–1967); Xuantong Emperor 宣統帝 (1908–1912, 1917)	Pujie 溥傑 (1907–1994)	Saga Hiro 嵯峨浩 (1914–1987)	Yunying 韞媖 (1909–1925)	Yunhe 韞龢 (1911–2001)	Yunying 韞穎 (1913–1992)
Huisheng 慧生 (1938–1957)	Husheng 嫮生 (born 1940)
Puqi 溥倛 (1915–1918)	Puren 溥任 (1918–2015)	Jin Yuting 金瑜庭	Yunxian 韞嫻 (1914–2003)	Yunxin 韞馨 (1917–1998)	Yunyu 韞娛 (1919–1982)	Yunhuan 韞歡 (1921–2004)
Jin Yuzhang 金毓嶂 (born 1942)	Jin Yuquan 金毓峑 (born 1946)	Jin Yulan 金毓嵐 (born 1948)	Jin Yukun 金毓琨	Jin Yucheng 金毓珵

== See also ==
- Royal and noble ranks of the Qing dynasty
