= Prince Chun's Mansion =

Imperial residence in Beijing, now a museum

Coordinates: 39.9437°N 116.3783°E

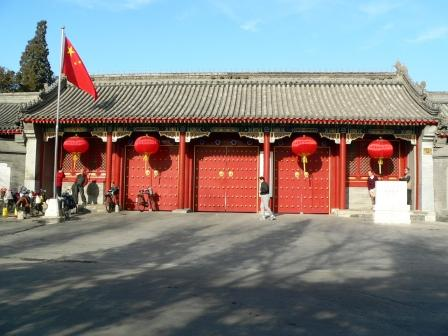
The red gates of the mansion

Prince Chun's Mansion (simplified Chinese: 醇亲王府; traditional Chinese: 醇親王府; pinyin: Chúnqīnwángfǔ), also known as the Northern Mansion (北府; Běifǔ), is a large residence in the siheyuan style with lavish private garden located near the Shichahai neighborhood in central Beijing. The grounds had been part of a villa built by Mingju, an official in the court of the Kangxi Emperor. It was later seized by Heshen, a favorite of the Qianlong Emperor, and following Heshen's purge and execution in 1799, it was bestowed on Yongxing by his brother the Jiaqing Emperor, and the mansion was renovated. The mansion changed hands several times, eventually ending up as the residence of a minor Qing official named Yusu. In 1888, as regent, Empress Dowager Cixi granted the mansion to her brother-in-law Yixuan, the biological father of the Guangxu Emperor. Yixuan died in 1891, and his title (Prince Chun) and residence were inherited by his second surviving son, Zaifeng. Zaifeng's own eldest son, Puyi, the last Qing emperor, was born at this mansion in 1906.

Prince Chun served as regent from the time of Puyi's accession in 1908 until the overthrow of the dynasty in 1912. Despite the collapse of the Qing dynasty, Prince Chun was permitted to stay in the mansion, and he died there in 1951.

Its garden became the residence of Soong Ching-ling, the widow of Sun Yat-sen, between 1963 and her death in 1981; it is now a public museum as her former residence open to visitors.
