= Shichahai =

Historic scenic area in north-central Beijing, China

Coordinates: 39.93802°N 116.38706°E

Shichahai (simplified Chinese: 什刹海; traditional Chinese: 什剎海; pinyin: Shíchàhǎi) is a historic scenic area consisting of three lakes in the north of central Beijing. They are located directly northwest of the Forbidden City and north of the Beihai Lake. Shichahai consists of the following three lakes: Qianhai (前海), Xihai (西海) and Houhai (后海). In imperial times it was called the Riverbank (河沿; héyán).

== Description ==
Shichahai consists of 147 hectares (360 acres) and dates back to the Jin Dynasty. From the time of the Yuan Dynasty it was the northernmost part of the Grand Canal linking Hangzhou in the south to Beijing in the North of China. Because of this, the Shichahai area used to be the most important commercial district with all kinds of activities going on. It harbors several temples and mansions.

Shichahai literally means "the lake of ten temples". Around the lake there are ten famous Taoist and Buddhist temples and several formal royal mansions and gardens. The most well known are the Prince Gong Mansion and the Prince Chun Mansion.

Shichahai is a famous scenic spot in Beijing, and it is near the north-gate of the Beihai Park. The borders of the lakes are lined by tall trees. In the summer tourists rent boats to paddle on the lakes. In the winter many people come to ice-skate.

In 1992, the municipal government of Beijing declared it as a "Historical and Cultural Scenic Area".

== Gallery ==
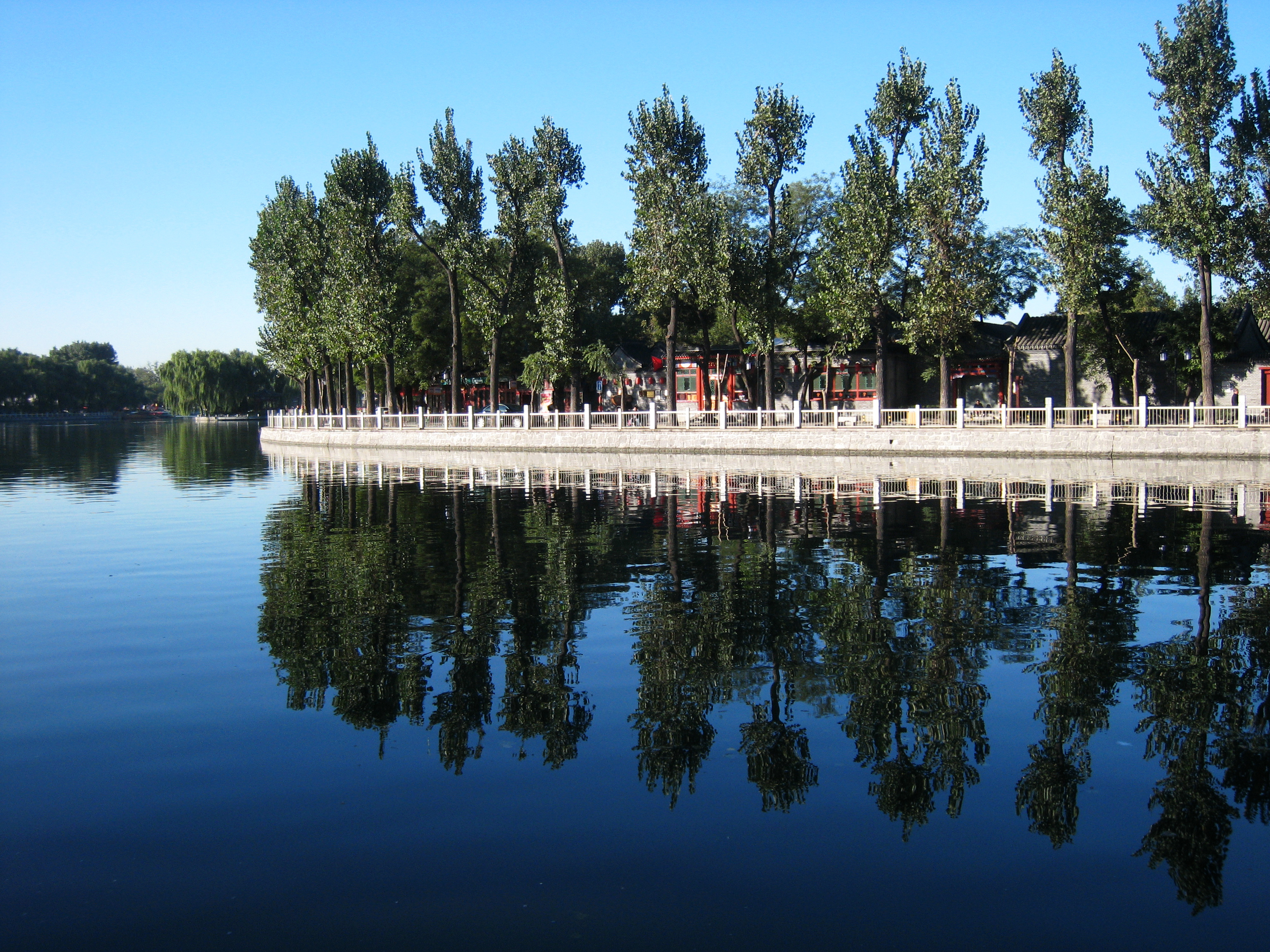
Shichahai

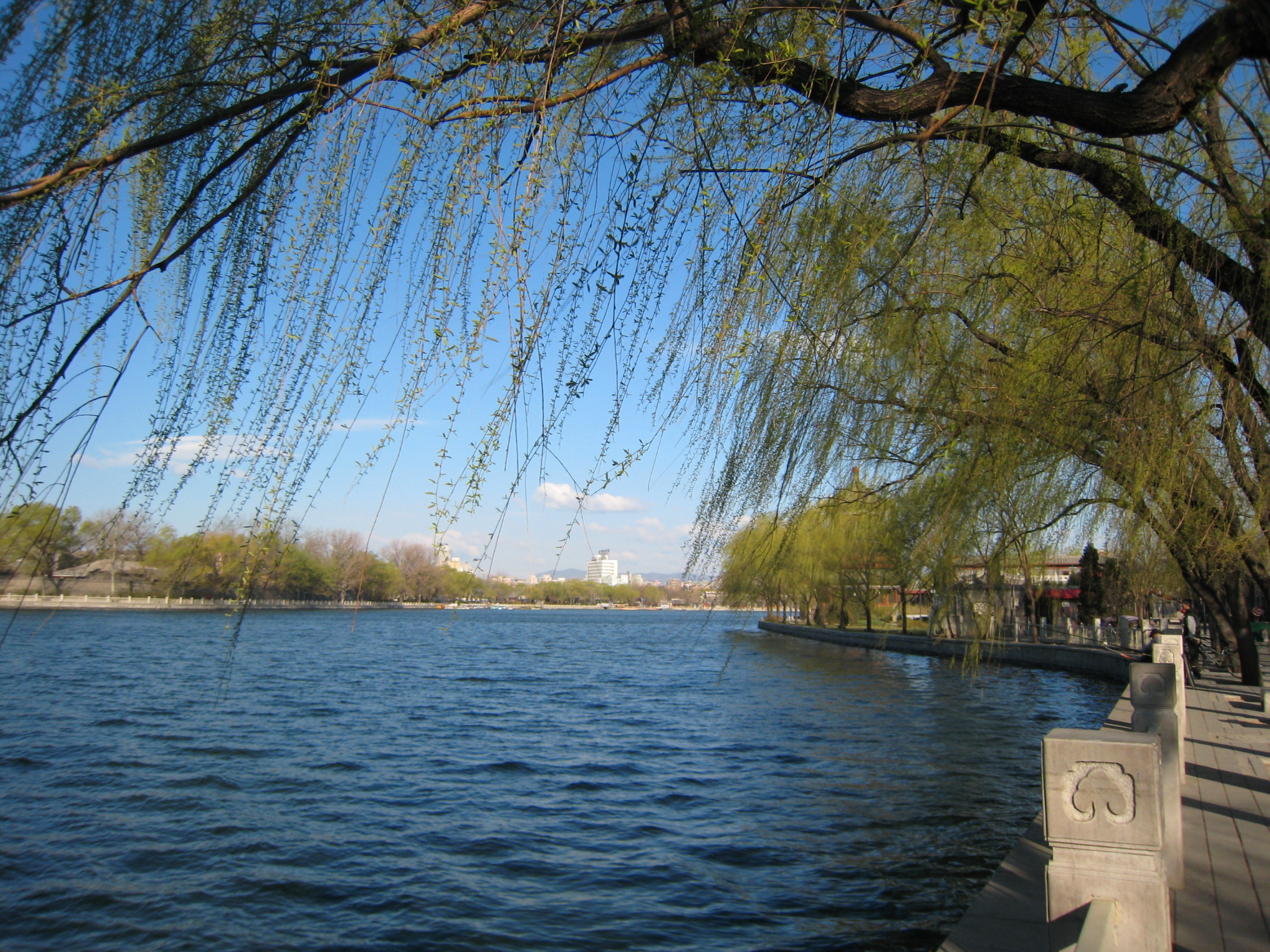
Shichahai

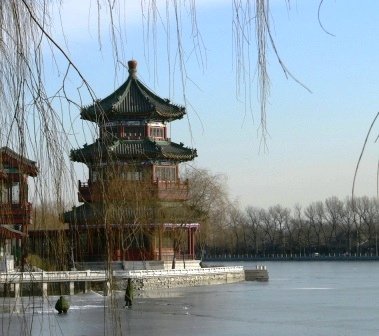
A group of buildings at the border of the Shichahai

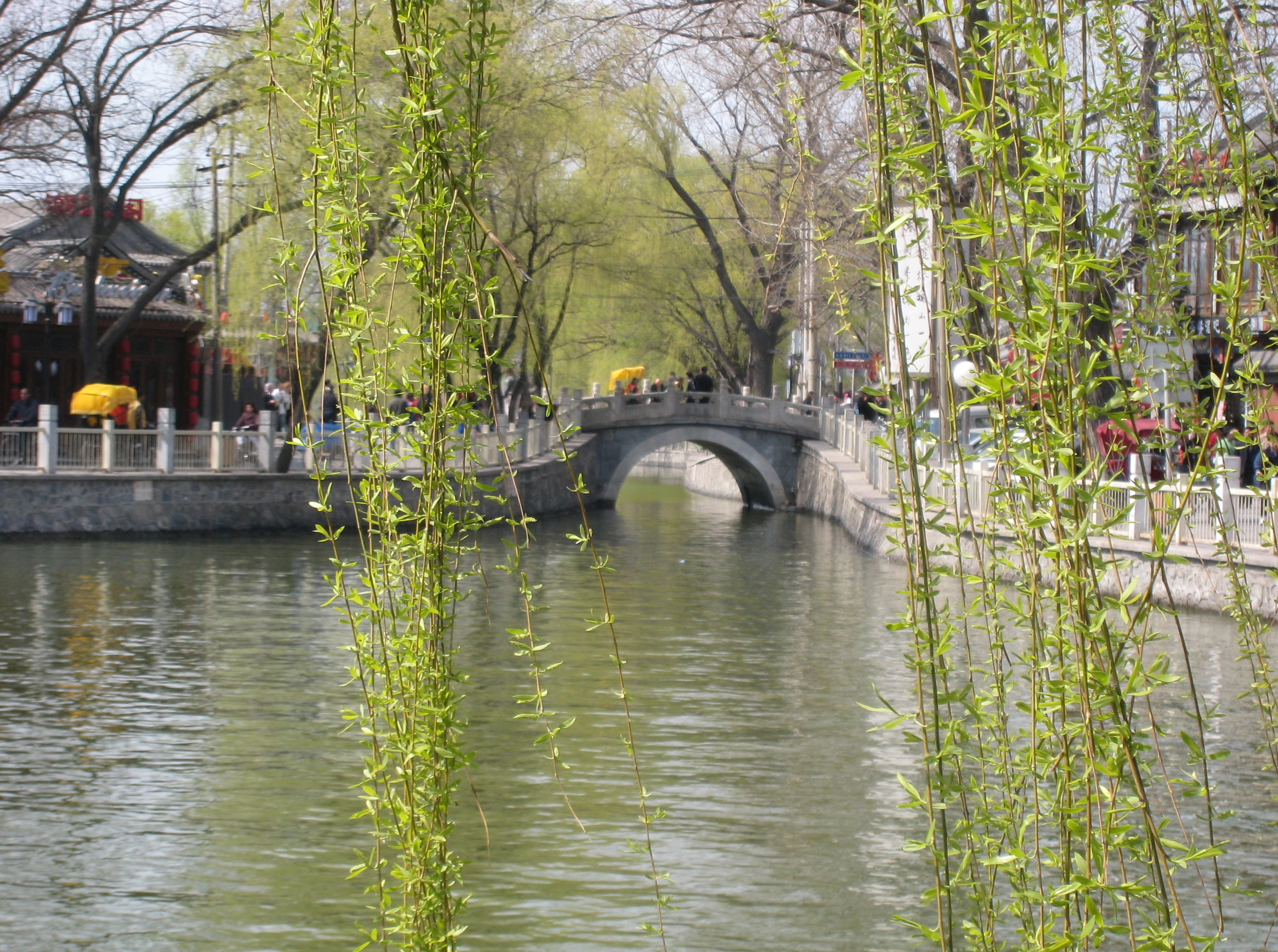
"Silver Ingot"- or "Yinding" bridge (银锭桥)

== See also ==
- Prince Gong Mansion
- Prince Chun Mansion
- Former Residence of Soong Ching-ling
- Former site of Fu Jen Catholic University
- Drum Tower and Bell Tower
