= Rongyuan =

Court official during the late Qing dynasty (1884–1951)

- 荣源

Minister of the Imperial Household Department

Personal details
- Born: 1884
- Died: 1951 (aged 66–67)
- Spouse(s): Lady Borjigit (m. ?; died.); Hengxiang (m. ?)
- Children: Runliang (son); Empress Wanrong (daughter); Runqi (son)

Rongyuan (Chinese: 榮源; 1884–1951) was a court official during the late Qing dynasty. A member of the Daur ethnicity registered under the Manchu Plain White Banner, he is best known as the father of Empress Wanrong, the last Empress Consort of China, and as the father-in-law to Emperor Puyi. He held key positions during the Xuantong reign as the Mongolian Deputy Lieutenant-General and Minister of the Imperial Household. After the fall of the Qing dynasty, he followed Puyi to the Northeast, served in the Manchukuo palace, and was granted the title of Duke Cheng'en.

== Early life and family ==
Rongyuan was born in 1884 during the Guangxu reign into the prominent Gobulo clan of the Daur ethnic group, whose families were historically integrated into the Qing military structure under the Eight Banners. His family resided in a large mansion located at No. 12, Mao'er Hutong, Beijing. He graduated from the Imperial University of Peking. Contemporary accounts described Rongyuan as a modest man who, despite his traditional aristocratic background, often maintained the demeanor of a quiet, old-fashioned gentleman.

Rongyuan married four times. His first wife was Lady Borjigit of the Mongol Plain White Banner in Chahar. She was a niece of Ruixun, the Minister Resident of Khovd, and Ruicheng, the Governor of Hubei, but the couple had no children. After her death, he married his second wife, Aisin-Gioro Hengxiang, a daughter of Prince Yuchang and granddaughter of Puxu, Prince Dingshen. She gave birth to his son, Runliang, and daughter, Wanrong, but died shortly after Wanrong's birth. His third wife was a daughter of Kuibin, Prince Rui of the First Rank, and they had no children. His fourth wife was Aisin-Gioro Zhongxin, a daughter of Prince Beile Yulang, who gave birth to his second son, Runqi.

Rongyuan was known for his progressive views on women's education, which were unusual among Qing nobles at the time. He believed that his daughter, Wanrong, should receive the same education as his sons. Besides studying Chinese classics, calligraphy, and music, Wanrong was taught English, piano, and Western customs by Western tutors, including the American missionary Isabel Ingram. As a result, she became highly educated for her time.

== Political career and imperial marriage ==
He began his official career in the late Qing dynasty in 1902. During his career, he served in several government positions, including Bureau Director (Langzhong) of the Beiyang Commercial Investigation Office, Attaché in the Ministry of War, and Supervisor of Construction for the Guangxu Emperor's mausoleum. Following the Xinhai Revolution of 1911 and the fall of the Qing dynasty, the imperial family was allowed to remain in the Forbidden City under the "Articles of Favorable Treatment", maintaining a small administrative court known as the "Small Court". He also held the hereditary noble title of First-Class Qingche Duwei (Commandant of Light Chariots). Rongyuan later served the abdicated emperor Puyi as Minister of the Imperial Household Department (内务府大臣).

In 1922, when Puyi reached the age to choose an empress, Rongyuan lobbied court factions in support of his daughter. Wanrong was selected as empress consort, defeating her rival Wenxiu. Following the selection, contemporary rumors alleged that Rongyuan had paid as much as 200,000 taels of gold in bribes to secure the outcome. Historians note that these claims remain unverified.

Through Wanrong's marriage to Puyi, Rongyuan became the emperor's father-in-law (Guozhang, 国丈), greatly raising the status and wealth of the Gobulo clan. In November 1924, Puyi was expelled from the Forbidden City, and Rongyuan resigned from his position as minister. He then followed Puyi and the remaining members of the imperial court into exile, first moving to Tianjin. Later, he accompanied Puyi to Northeast China following the establishment of the Japanese-backed state of Manchukuo. Although he did not hold a major political office during this period, Rongyuan held several influential positions in Manchukuo. He served as an advisor to the Imperial Household Department, chairman of the Manchuria Aviation Company, supervisor of the Manchuria Automobile Manufacturing Company, and vice chairman of the Manchuria Petroleum Company.

== Later years and legacy ==
After the end of World War II, he was captured by the Soviet Red Army on 31 August 1945 and detained in Khabarovsk for five years. He was returned to the People's Republic of China on 1 August 1950 and died on 18 April 1951 from a cerebral hemorrhage caused by hypertension.

Although the marriage brought prestige to the family, it also brought tragedy. Wanrong's marriage to Puyi became unhappy, and she suffered from illness and opium addiction. Historians have noted that, before her death in a prison camp in 1946, Wanrong reportedly blamed her father for her suffering and believed that his ambition to become the emperor's father-in-law and make her empress had ruined her life.
