= Zhang Garden =

Mansion in Tianijn, China

Coordinates: 39.123991°N 117.18503°E

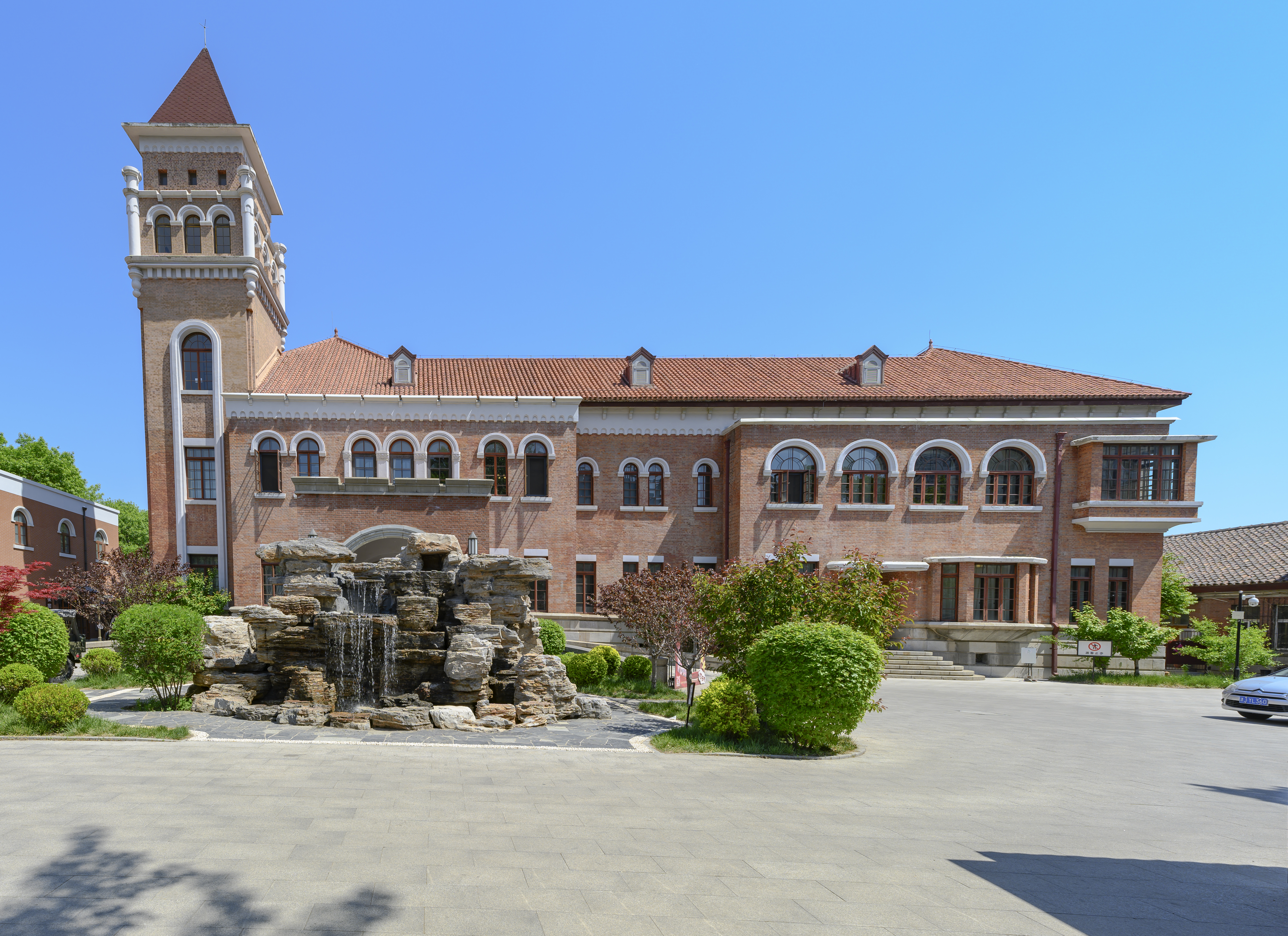
The exterior of the rebuilt Zhang Garden

The Zhang Garden or Zhangyuan (張園) is a European-style former garrison building in Tianijn, China built in the 1930s. Prior to construction of the garrison building the site contained a mansion residence, built in 1916 in the Japanese Concession of Tianjin by Zhang Biao, a former high-ranking official in the Qing Court. The mansion served as a temporary home for both Sun Yat-sen, the first president of the Republic of China, who briefly resided there in 1924, as well as Puyi, the last Emperor of the Qing Dynasty, who lived in the now demolished mansion from 1925 until 1929.

== History ==
In 1912, Qing official Zhang Biao, settled in the Japanese Concession in Tianijn and built a three-story mansion in a Western Neoclassical-inspired style on Miyajima Street (now No.59 Anshan Road). By the 1920s he cooperated with a businessman to create a restaurant, theater, and an open-air cinema at Zhangyuan. Four bungalows on the right side of the park for Puyi's entourage were also later built. After Puyi left Tianjin, Zhang Biao's son sold the Zhang Garden to the Japanese military in the 1930s and it was subsequently demolished and rebuilt. It was then used as a garrison station for the Japanese Concession police. After World War II it was used as a garrison for the Chinese Kuomintang Army in 1946 during the Chinese Civil War. It has since been used as a theatre and a library.

=== Gallery ===
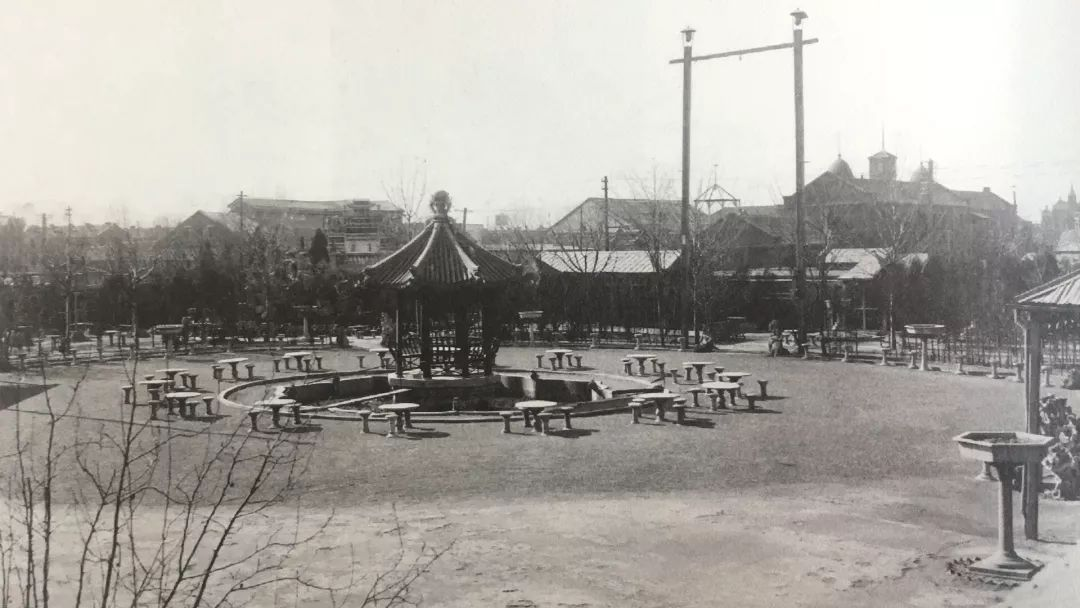
Zhang Garden exterior

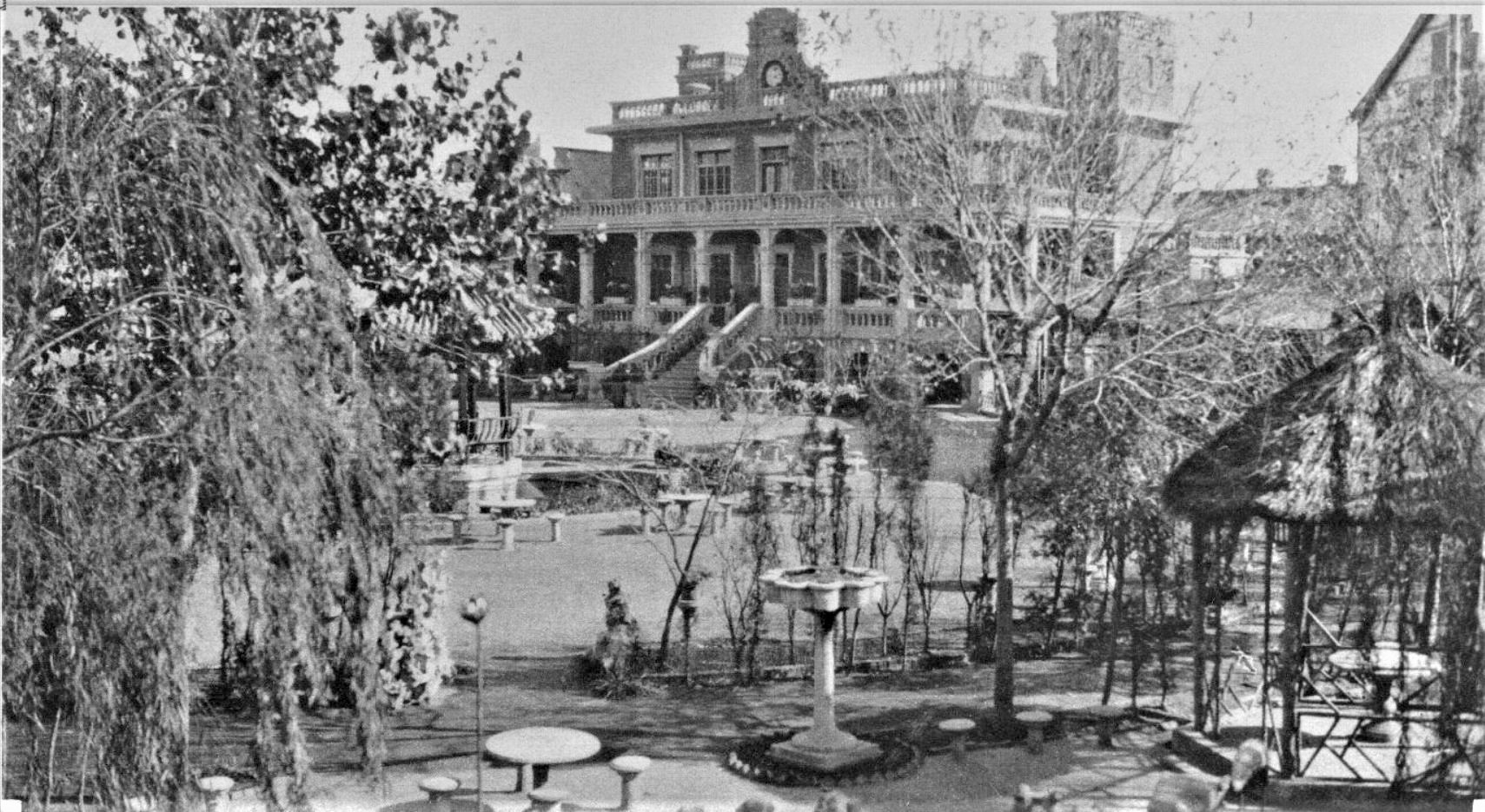
Zhang Garden building and exterior

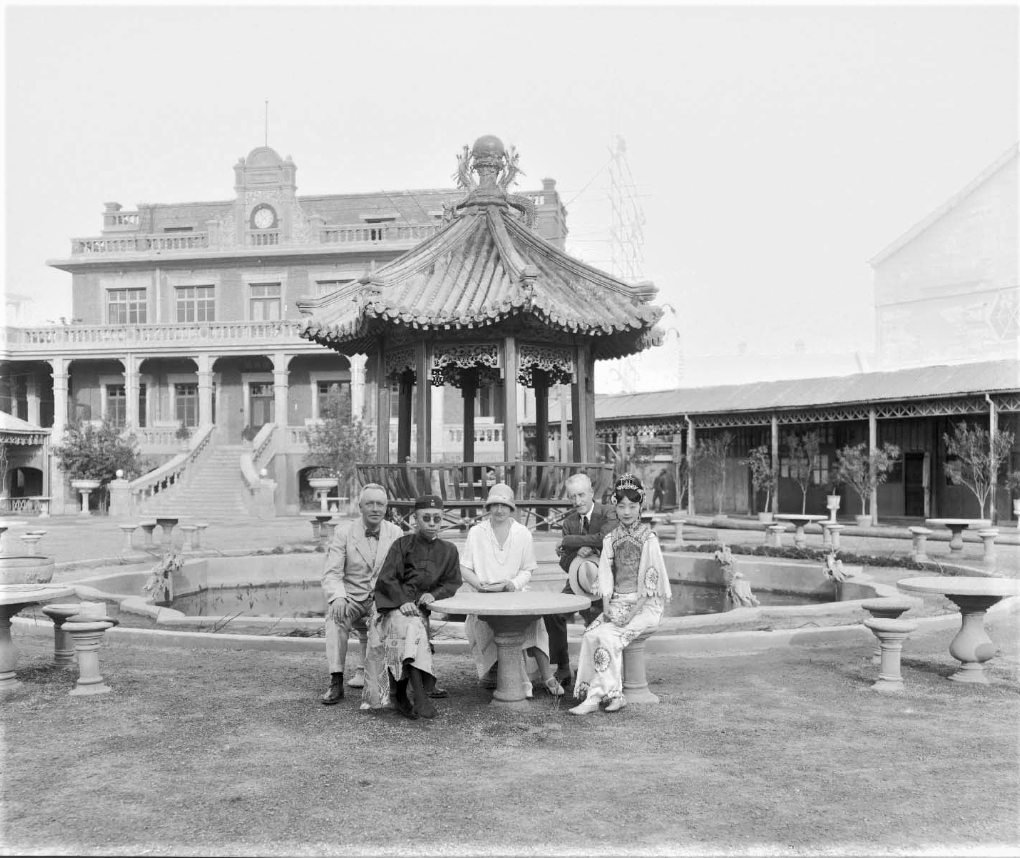
Puyi, Wanrong, Reginald Johnston and Freeman Freeman-Thomas in the Zhang Garden

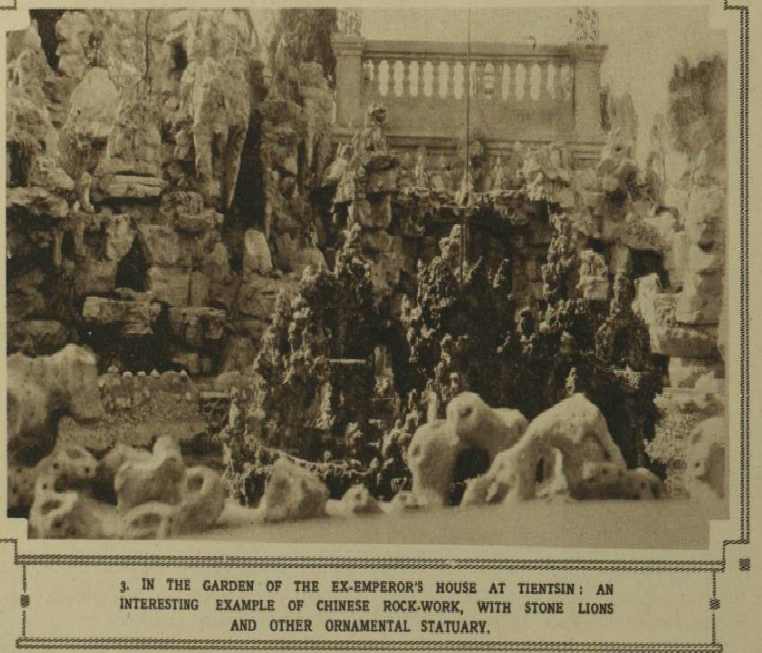
The rock garden in the Zhang Garden

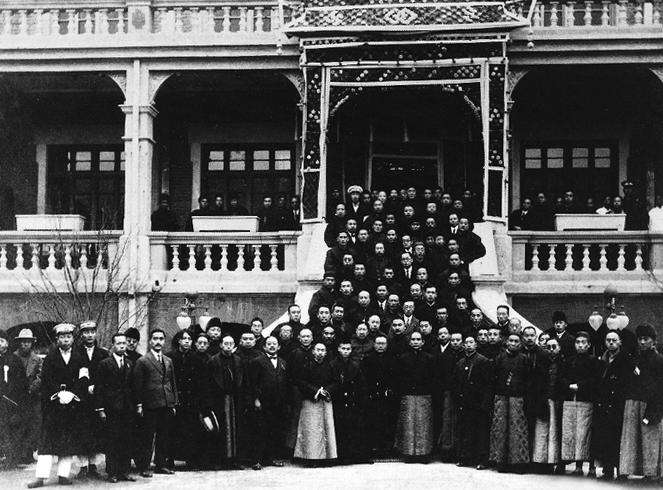
Sun Yat-Sen at the Zhang Garden, 1924

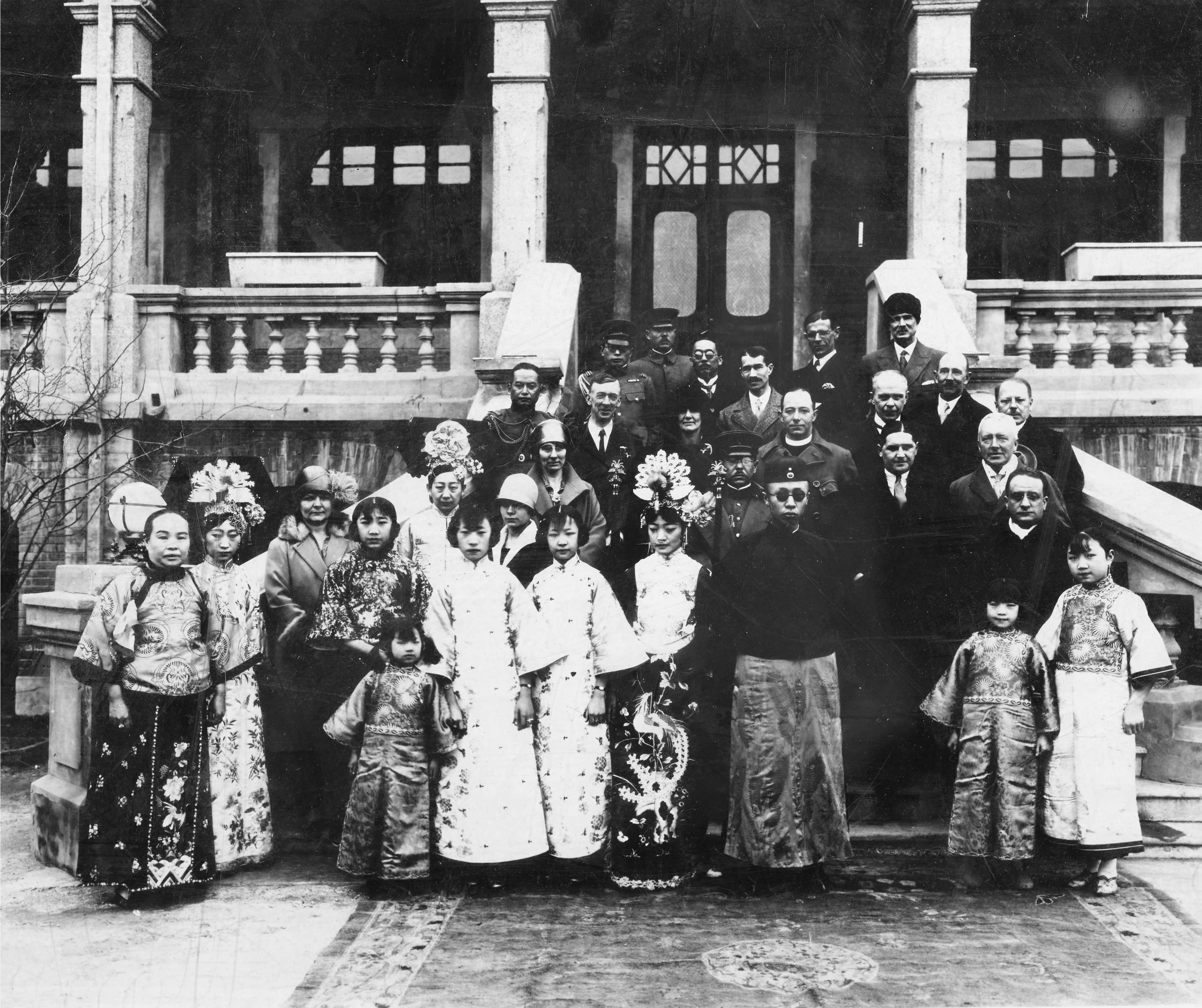
Puyi and Wanrong in 1927 at the Zhang Garden

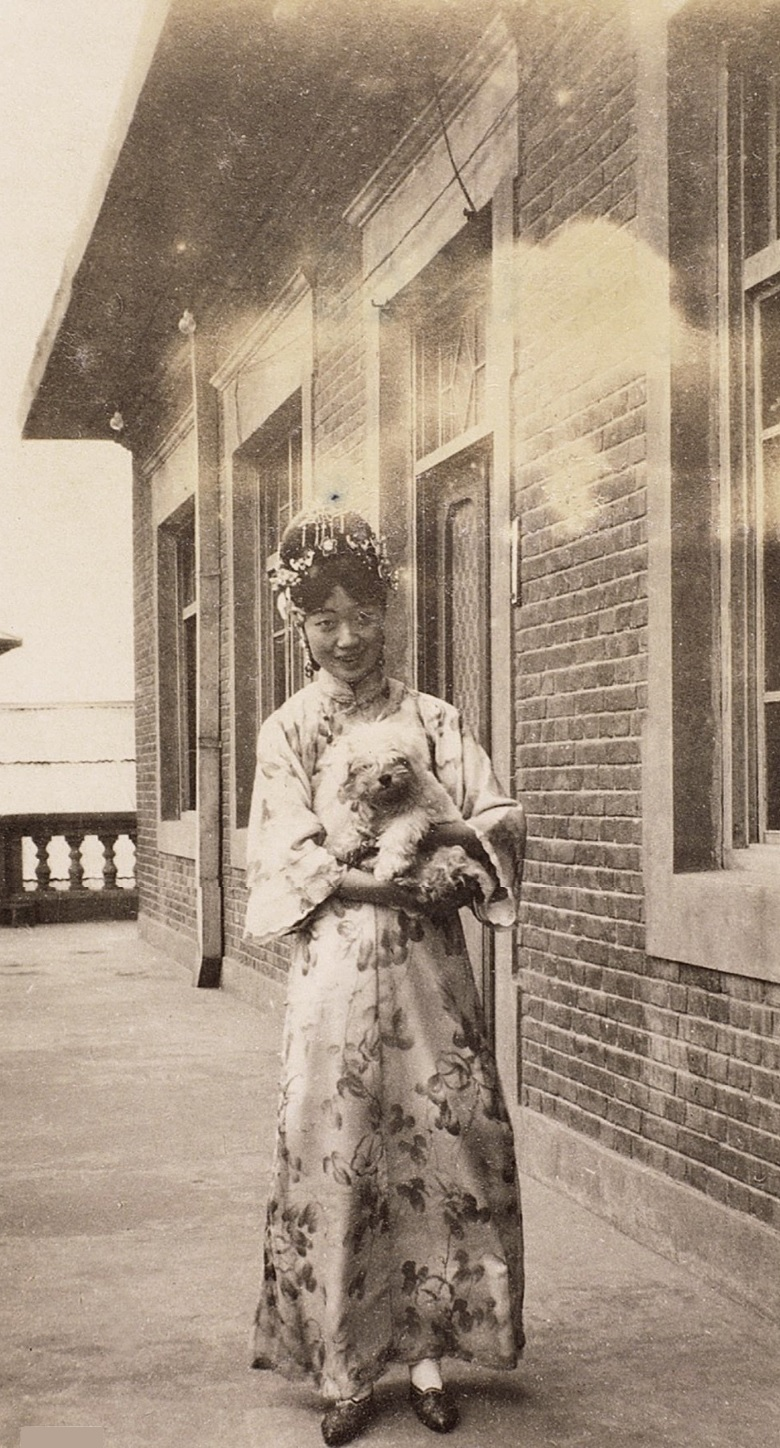
Empress Consort Wanrong on the balcony of the Zhang Garden mansion

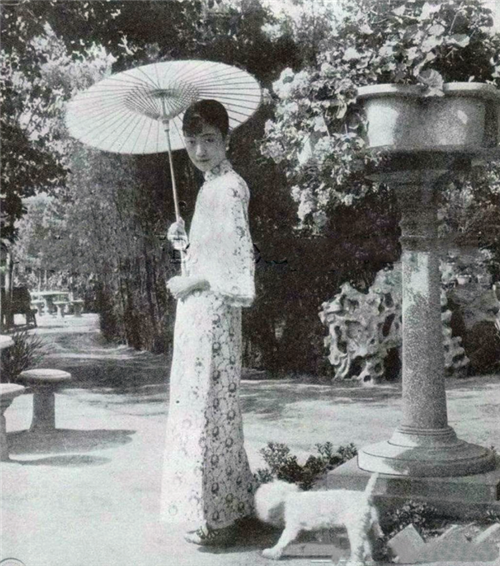
Empress Consort Wanrong in the Zhang Garden with her dog

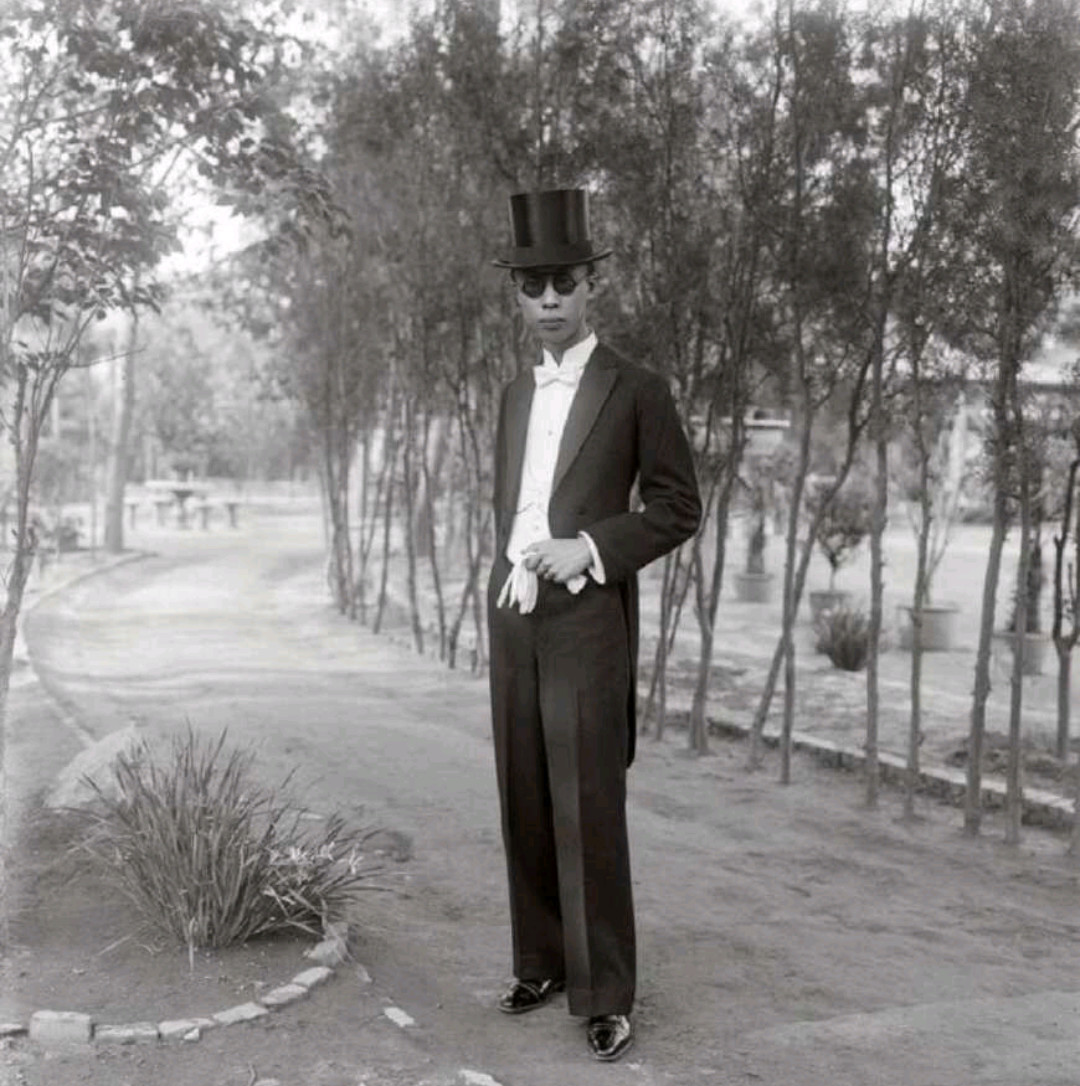
Puyi in the Zhang Garden

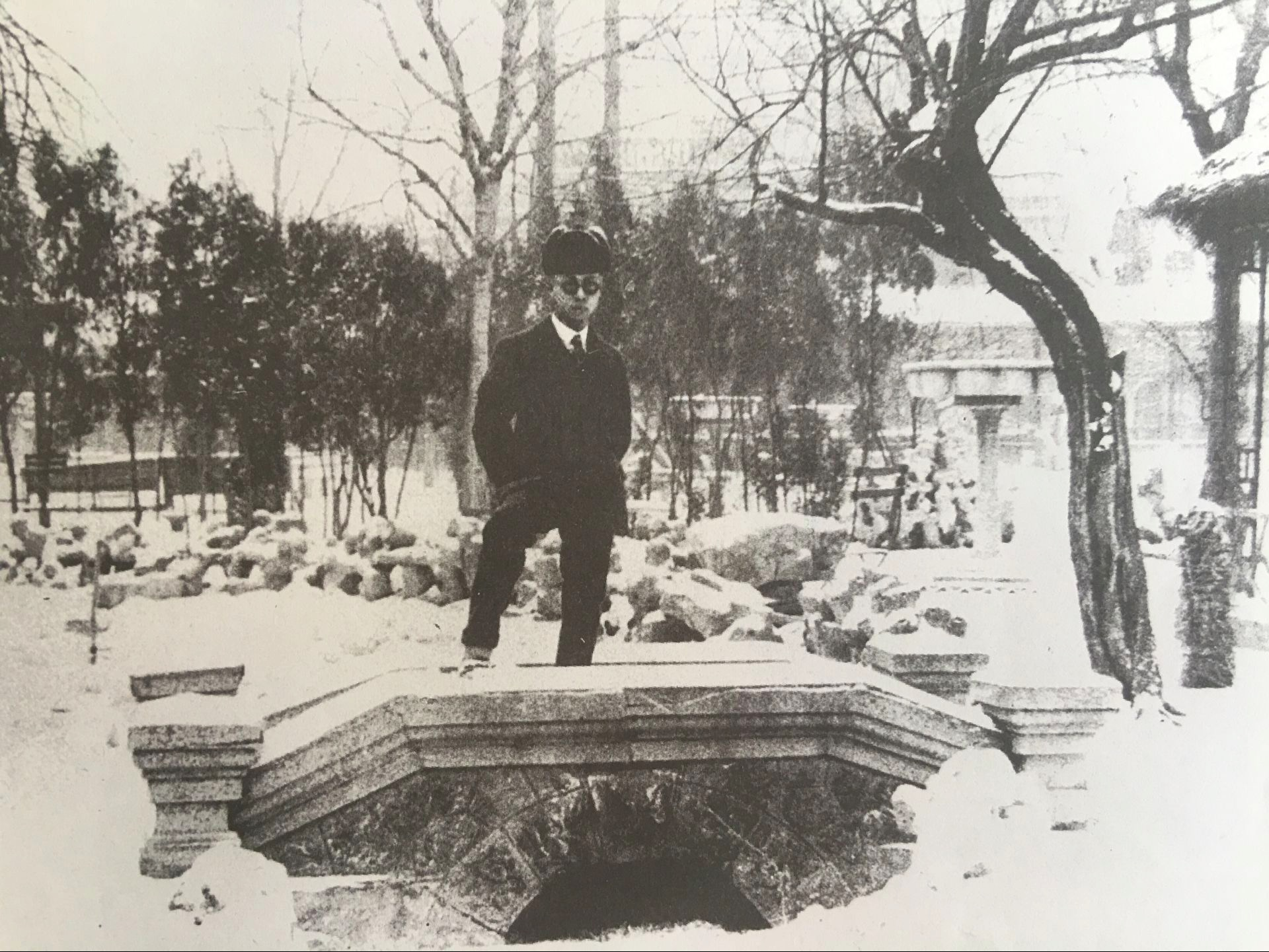
Puyi in the Zhang Garden during winter

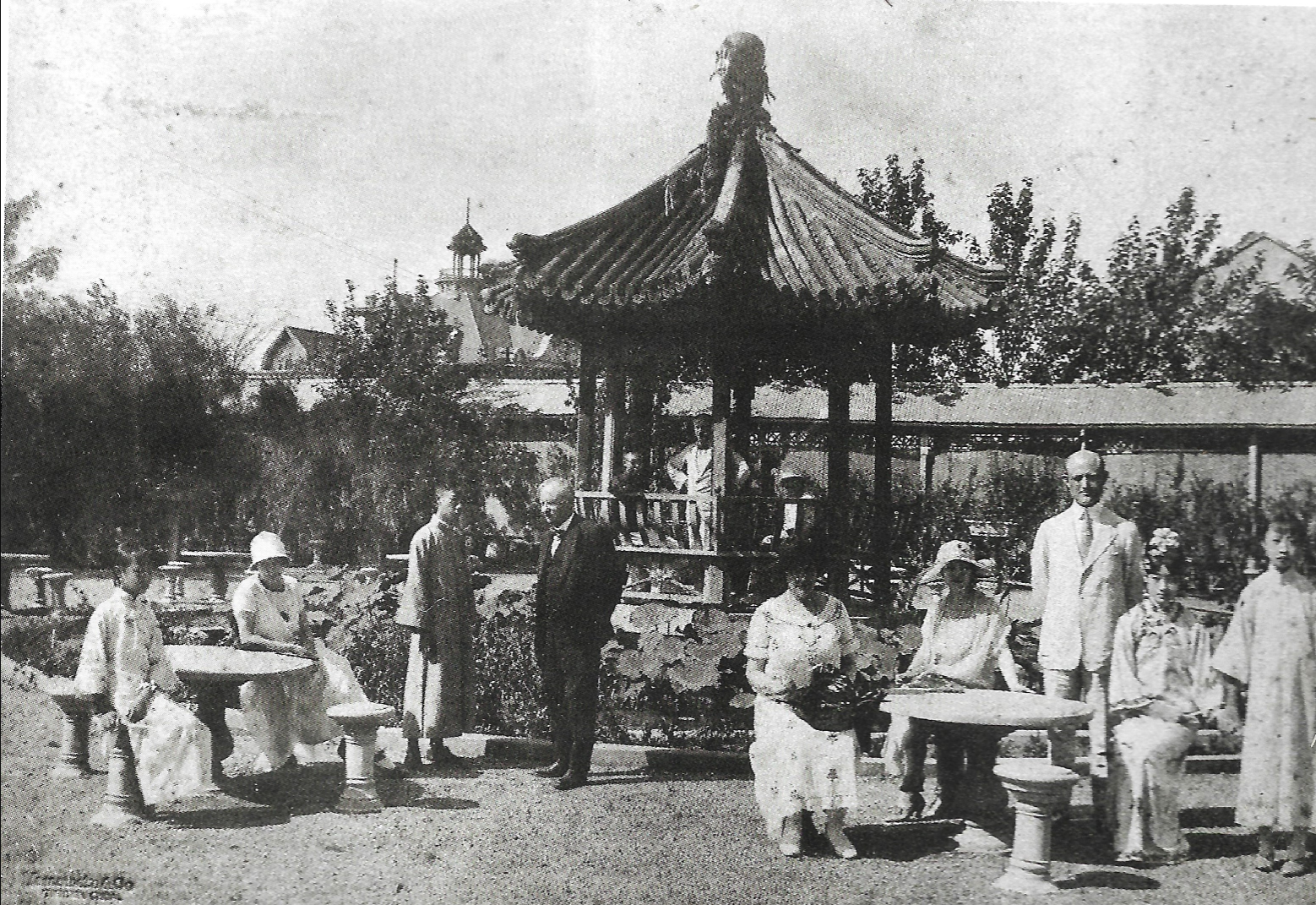
Zhang Garden exterior

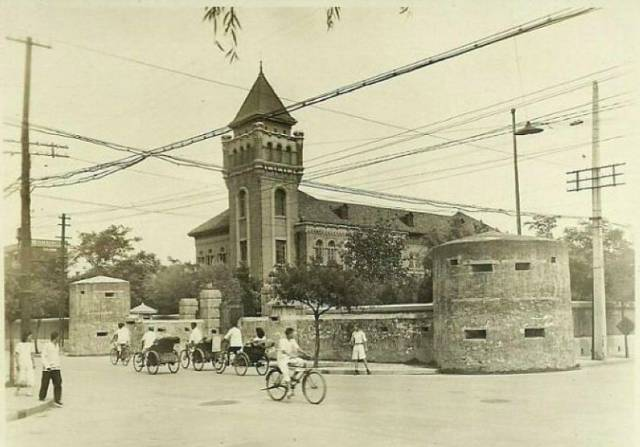
Zhang Garden after being rebuilt

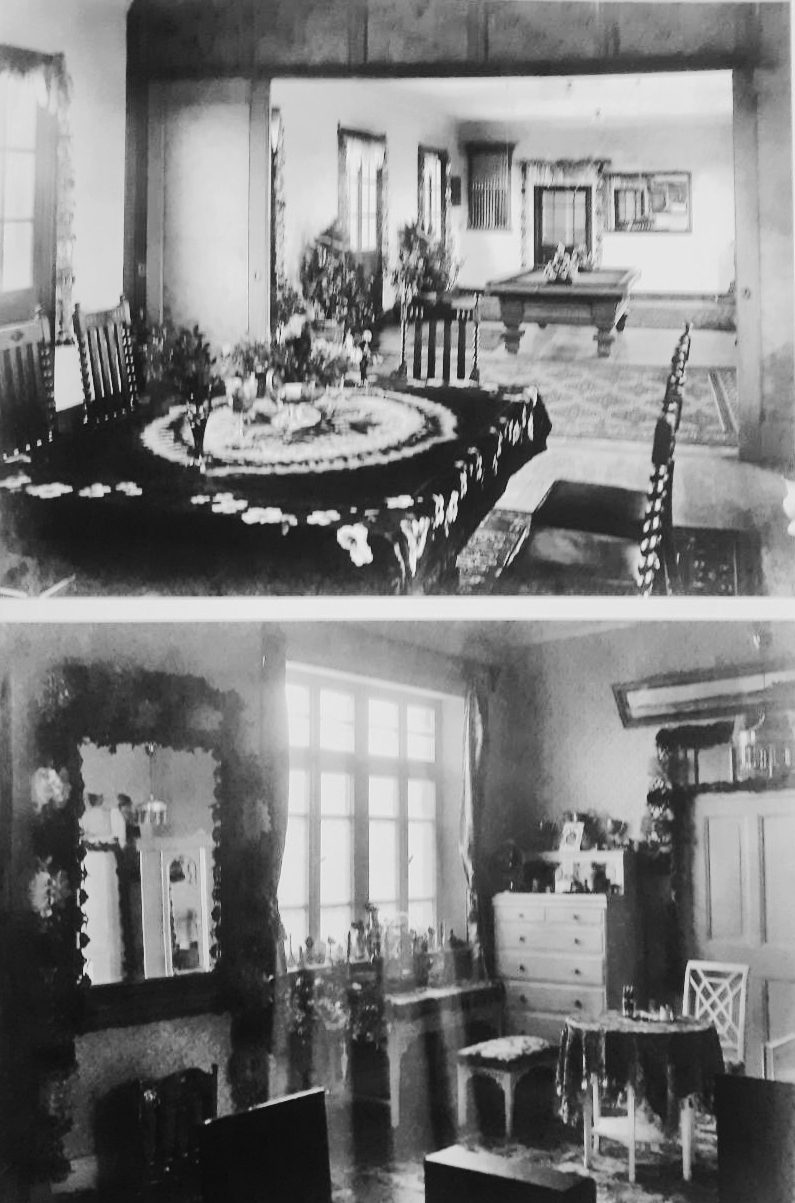
Two interior spaces within the Zhang Garden

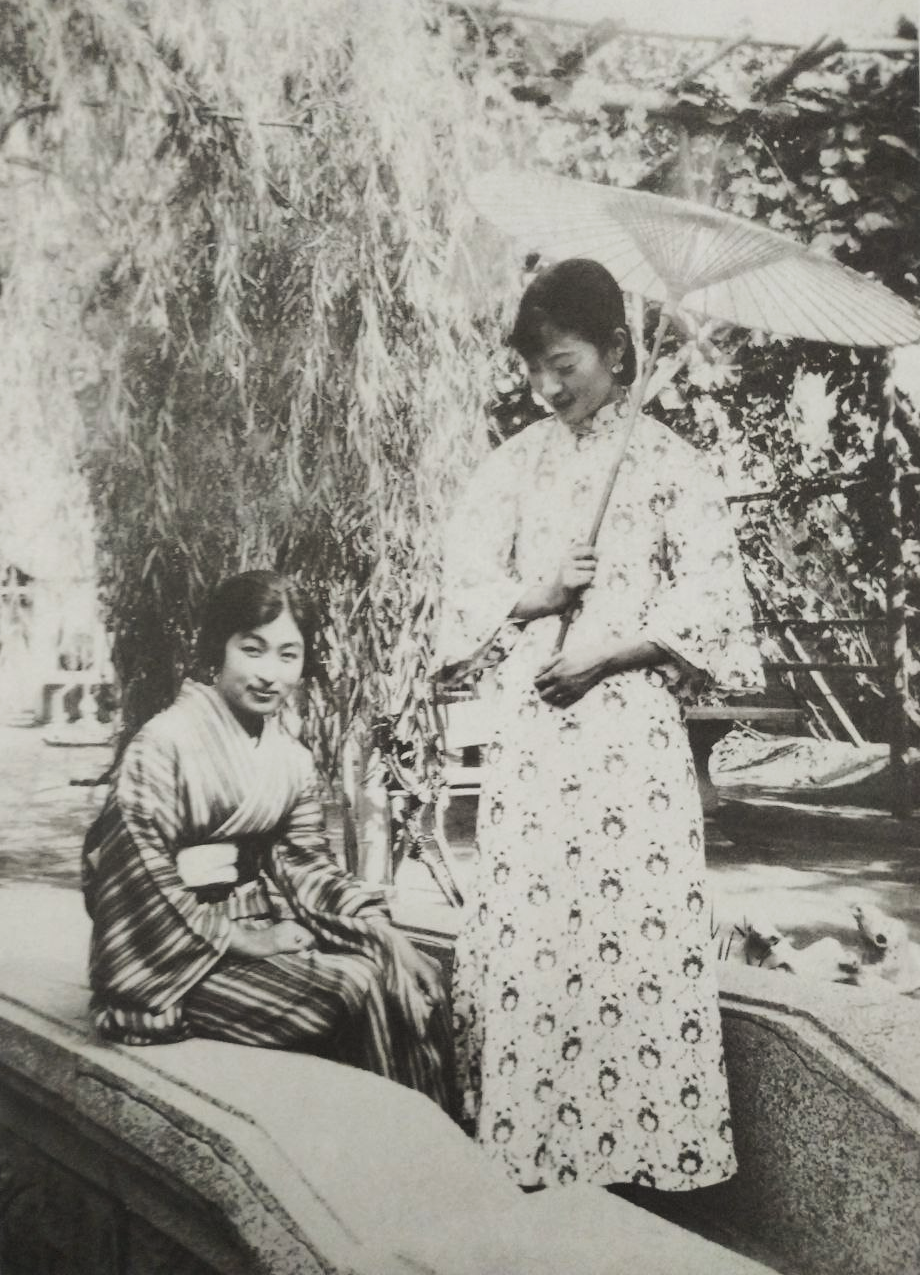
Empress Consort Wanrong and a friend in the Zhang Garden

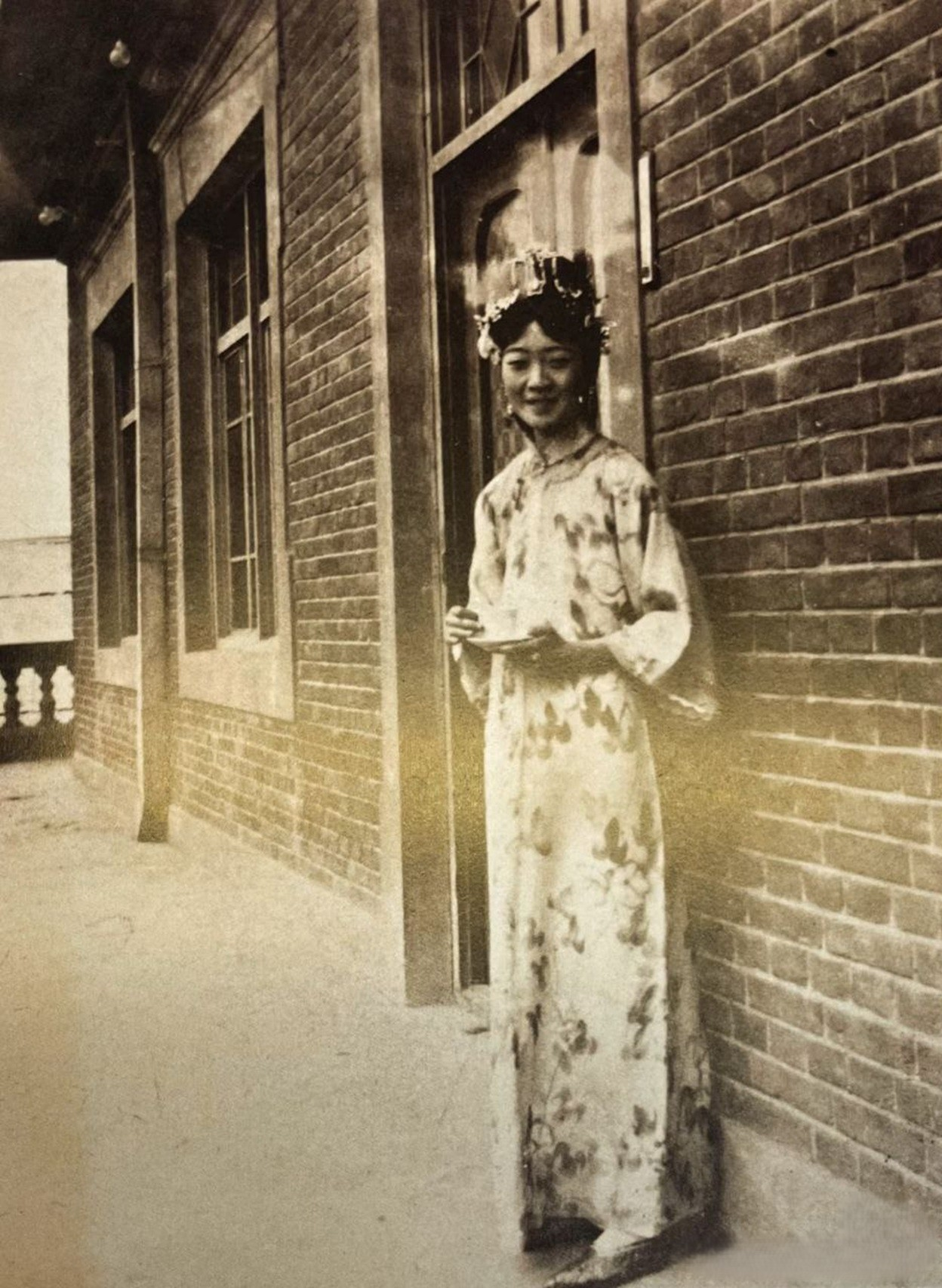
Empress Wanrong on the balcony of the Zhang Garden

== See also ==
- Foreign concessions in Tianjin
- Wanrong
- Wenxiu
