= Wanrong =

Empress of Manchukuo from 1934 to 1945 (1906–1946)

- Empress Xiaokemin
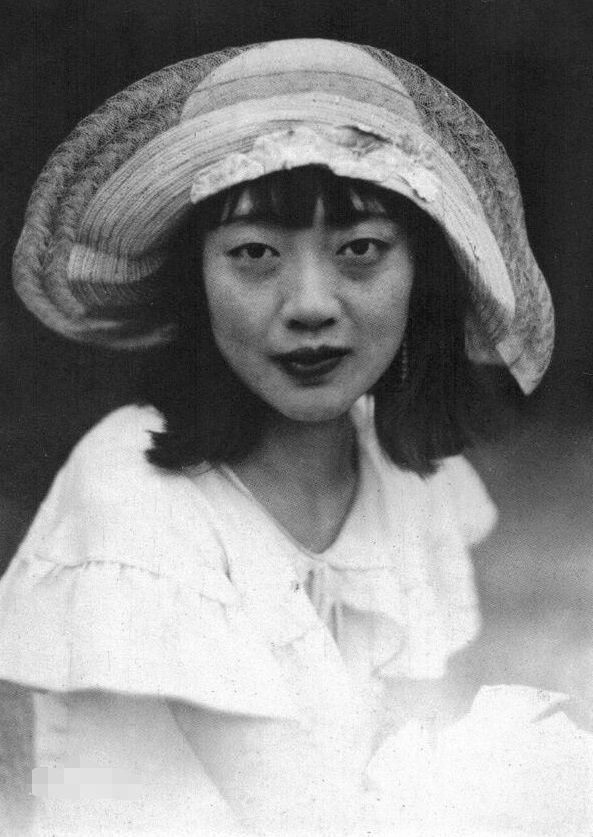
- Wanrong, c. 1929–1931

Empress consort of Manchukuo
- Tenure: 1 March 1934 – 17 August 1945
- Predecessor: Empress Xiaodingjing (in Qing)
- Successor: Monarchy abolished
- Born: 13 November 1906 (光绪三十二年 二月 四日); Beijing, Qing dynasty
- Died: 20 June 1946 (aged 39) (丙戌五月 二十一日); Yanji, Jilin, China
- Spouse: Xuantong Emperor (m. 1922)
Names
- Wanrong (婉容)
Posthumous name
- Empress Xiaokemin (孝恪愍皇后)
- House: Gobulo (郭布羅)
- Father: Rongyuan
- Mother: Hengxin

Wanrong
- Chinese: 婉容
Transcriptions
Standard Mandarin
- Hanyu Pinyin: Wǎnróng
- Wade–Giles: Wan^{3}-jung^{2}
Yue: Cantonese
- Jyutping: Wun^{2}-jung^{4}

Empress Xiaokemin (posthumous name)
- Traditional Chinese: 宣統皇后
- Simplified Chinese: 宣统皇后
Transcriptions
Standard Mandarin
- Hanyu Pinyin: Xiàokèmǐn Huánghòu
- Wade–Giles: Hsiao^{4}-k'o^{4}-min^{3} Huang^{2}-hou^{4}
Yue: Cantonese
- Jyutping: Haau^{3}kok^{3}man^{5} Wong^{4}hau^{6}

Muhong (courtesy name)
- Traditional Chinese: 慕鴻
- Simplified Chinese: 慕鸿
- Literal meaning: Admirable Swan
Transcriptions
Standard Mandarin
- Hanyu Pinyin: Mùhóng
Yue: Cantonese
- Jyutping: Mo^{6}hung^{4}

Zhilian (art name)
- Traditional Chinese: 植蓮
- Simplified Chinese: 植莲
- Literal meaning: Lotus Plant
Transcriptions
Standard Mandarin
- Hanyu Pinyin: Zhílián
Yue: Cantonese
- Jyutping: Zik^{6}lin^{4}

Wanrong (Chinese: 婉容; 13 November 1906 – 20 June 1946), of the Manchu Plain White Banner Gobulo clan, was the wife and empress consort of Puyi, the last emperor of China. She is sometimes anachronistically called Elizabeth, Xuantong Empress, referring to Puyi's era name. She was the titular empress consort of the former Qing dynasty from their marriage in 1922 until the exile of the imperial family in November 1924. She later became the empress consort of the Japanese puppet state of Manchukuo in northeastern China from 1934 until the abolition of the monarchy in August 1945, at the conclusion of the Second World War. She was posthumously honored with the title Empress Xiaokemin (孝恪愍皇后). “孝 Xiao” (filial) and “恪 Ke” (dutiful) articulate Confucian ideals of moral conduct, while “愍 Min” conveys an official expression of lamentation for a life marked by misfortune.

During the Soviet invasion of Manchuria at the end of the Second Sino-Japanese War in 1945, Wanrong was captured by Chinese Communist guerrillas and transferred to various locations before she was placed in a prison camp in Yanji, Jilin. She died in prison in June 1946 and her remains were never found. On 23 October 2006, Wanrong's younger brother, Runqi, conducted a ritual burial for her in the Western Qing tombs.

== Other names ==
Her courtesy name was Muhong (慕鴻) and her art name was Zhilian. She also adopted a Western name, Elizabeth, which was inspired by Queen Elizabeth I of England.

== Family background and early life ==
Wanrong was born into the Gobulo (郭布羅) clan on 13 November 1906, which translates to the 32nd year of the second month of the fourth day of the Guangxu Emperor's reign, under the Plain White Banner of the Eight Banners and of Daur ancestry.

Her father Rongyuan (榮源) had held office under the Qing dynasty until the 1911 Revolution. When Wanrong became empress in 1922, her father took employment in the Imperial Household Department until Wanrong was expelled. Wanrong's biological mother, Hengxin (恒馨) died when Wanrong was two. Wanrong was raised by her stepmother, Hengxiang (恆香). Wanrong had a brother, Runliang (潤良) as well as a half-brother, Runqi (潤麒). The family lived in Mao Er hutong ("hat maker lane") near Di'anmen in Beijing's Dongcheng District. She was cousins with Wang Mintong.

Unlike many of his contemporaries, Rongyuan believed in gender equality in regards to education, so he arranged for Wanrong to be educated in the same manner as her brothers. Wanrong attended an American missionary school in Tianjin.

== Marriage to Puyi ==
The Qing dynasty was overthrown in 1912 and replaced by the Republic of China, marking the end of thousands of years of imperial rule in China. The former imperial family were granted special privileges by the Republican government, which allowed them to retain their imperial titles and be treated with respect. Puyi, the abdicated Last Emperor, was allowed to hold an imperial-style wedding in the Forbidden City.

Puyi, 16 years old at the time, was shown a selection of photographs of young females for him to choose his spouse from. Puyi later claimed the faces were too small to distinguish between. He selected Wenxiu, a 12-year-old girl, but the decision was opposed by the former concubine dowager Consort Jin based on her status and appearance. The dowager consorts suggested Puyi choose Wanrong, who was about the same age and had a similar family background as he did. Because he had already chosen Wenxiu, they decided he would marry both Wanrong and Wenxiu as his primary and secondary spouses in accordance with Manchu tradition. After Wanrong was selected, she moved back to Beijing to prepare for the marriage. A group of palace eunuchs were sent to her home to prepare her for an imperial wedding. Runqi, Wanrong's brother, said that: "They taught her how to bow and behave with the emperor. She rebelled. She was fed up with the lessons and unhappy about marrying someone she had never met before." However, she eventually conceded to the marriage.

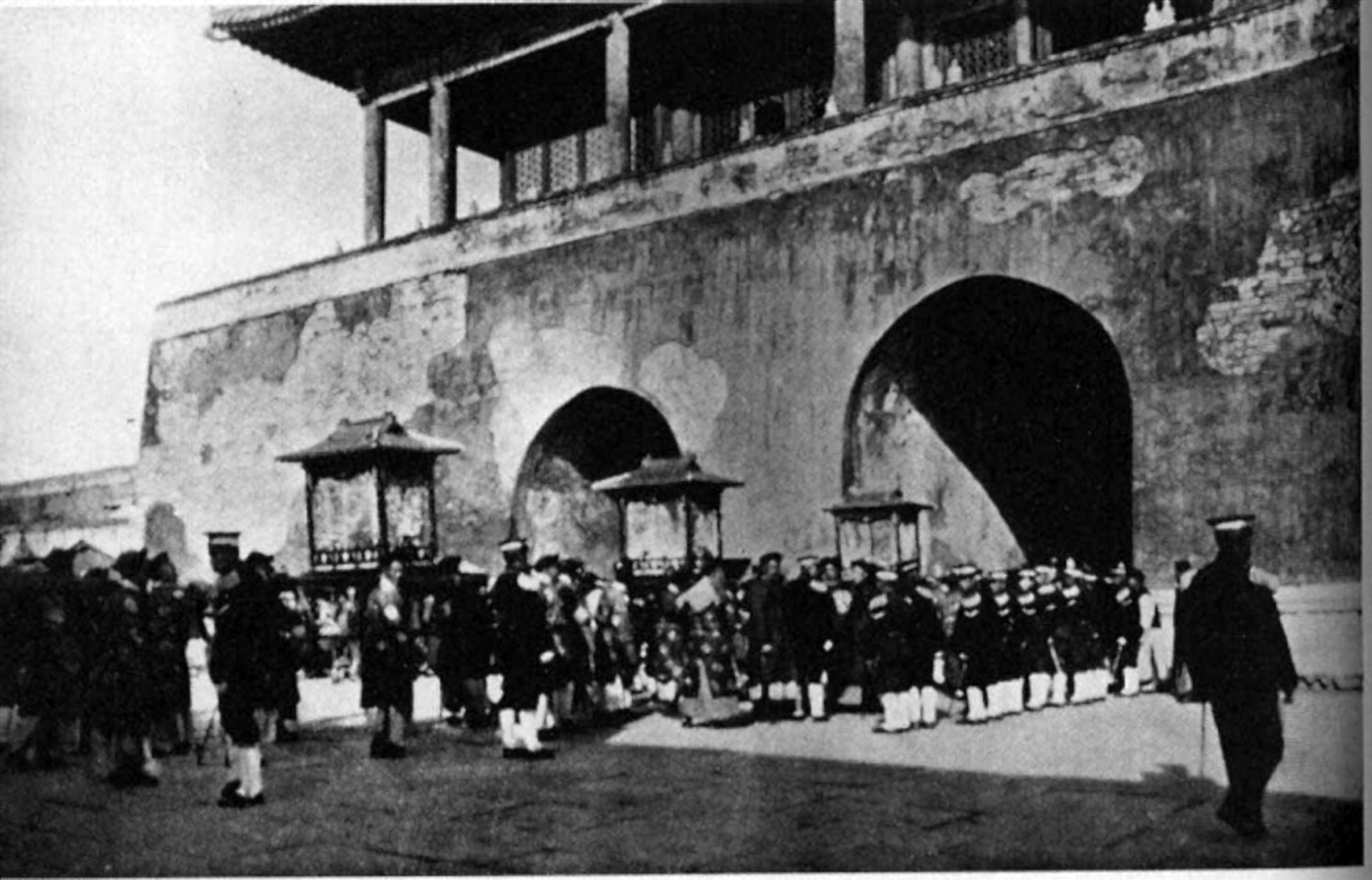
The wedding ceremony of Puyi and Wanrong

Wanrong's wedding included three traditional ceremonies, both before and after the grand nuptials: The ceremony of betrothal gifts, in which a large procession presented gifts from Puyi at her home; the Daizheng ceremony, in which the Emperor sent messengers to the bride's home to inform them of the wedding date; and the title-conferring ceremony, in which The Book of Empress Title-conferring was presented to Wanrong at her home. In accordance with Manchu tradition, she stepped over a large fire, a saddle, and an apple on her wedding day.

The American travel writer Richard Halliburton, who was present at the event, described it as follows: "At four in the morning this gorgeous spectacle moved through the moonlit streets of Peking en-route to the prison-palace. The entire city was awake and the people thronged the line of march. A forest of pennants blazed and fluttered past ...gold dragons on black silk, blue dragons on gold silk; and swaying lanterns, and gilded kiosques containing the bride’s ceremonial robes, and princes on horseback surrounded by their colorful retinues. There was more than enough music. Last of all came the bride’s sedan hung with yellow brocade, roofed with a great gold dragon, and borne along by sixteen noblemen. I followed close behind the shrouded chair, and wondered about the state of mind of the little girl inside. Headed straight for prison, she was on the point of surrendering forever the freedom she had hitherto enjoyed... The procession wound its way to the 'Gate of Propitious Destiny,' one of the entrances to the palace, and halted before it. Torches flared. There was subdued confusion and whispers. Mandarins and court officials hurried back and forth. Slowly, darkly, the great gates swung open,—I could look inside the courtyard and see the blazing avenue of lamps down which the procession would move up to the throne room where the emperor waited. Into the glitter and glamour of this 'Great Within' the trembling little girl, hidden in her flowered box, was carried. Then as I watched, the gates boomed shut and the princess became an empress."

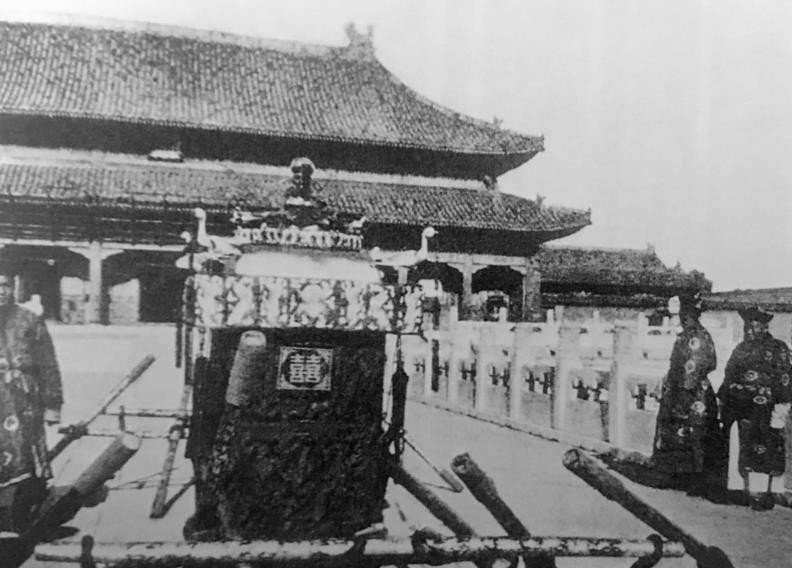
The box sedan chair used to carry Wanrong into the Forbidden City

Puyi sat upon his Dragon Throne as people kowtowed to him. Later, in Wanrong's new living quarters, she kowtowed to him six times as the decree of their marriage was read in celebration. Wanrong wore a veil, as was Imperial Chinese tradition for the night-time wedding ceremony, and Puyi, who was inexperienced with women, later stated: "I hardly thought about marriage and family. It was only when the Empress came into my field of vision with a crimson satin cloth embroidered with a dragon and a phoenix over her head that I felt at all curious about what she looked like." Afterwards Puyi, Wanrong, and his other consort Wenxiu stayed in the Palace of Earthly Tranquility for the night where Wanrong first showed her face. The ritual before entering the bridal chamber included eating cake, drinking wine served in two cups tied together with a red silk thread, and eating "longevity noodles." Puyi left and did not consummate the marriage.

After the marriage Wanrong began living in the Palace of Gathering Elegance, the old residence of Empress Dowager Cixi, whereas the Emperor continued living in the Hall of Mental Cultivation.

== Life in the Forbidden City ==
As empress consort of China, Wanrong had every whim and desire dealt with by a retinue of eunuchs and maids. The Empress had her own separate kitchen as well as a special tailor who would make new dresses for her almost every day. When bathing, her elderly maids would undress and clean her. Afterwards she would often sit on the side of the basin and admire her body. Sun Yaoting, her personal eunuch servant, said despite her volatile character and occasional bursts of temper, Wanrong was generally kind to servants and would offer him food as she often dined without Puyi. Her brother, Runqi, recalled Wanrong admonished him for being disrespectful to a servant on one occasion. The Empress, however, was not afraid to dismiss those who upset her, expelling an unfortunate eunuch who was apparently hard-of-hearing for incompetence.

Wanrong enjoyed reading, jazz, Western cuisine, playing the piano, writing in English and photography. Described as old-fashioned by her brother, Wanrong was nevertheless somewhat more Westernized than Puyi, having grown up in the French Concession in Tianjin, and she was noted for teaching Puyi how to eat Western food with a knife and fork. An article in Time magazine dated Monday, 12 May 1924, titled "China: Henry the Democrat", noted Huan Tung (Xuantong Emperor), and Wanrong had adopted Western names, with Wanrong's being Elizabeth. The Empress also wrote poetry, composed at least one song, practiced painting and wrote letters, some of which included a few English words.

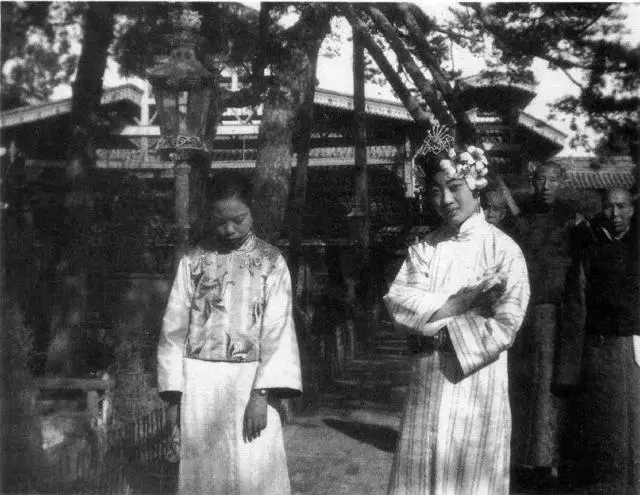
Wanrong and Wenxiu in the Forbidden City

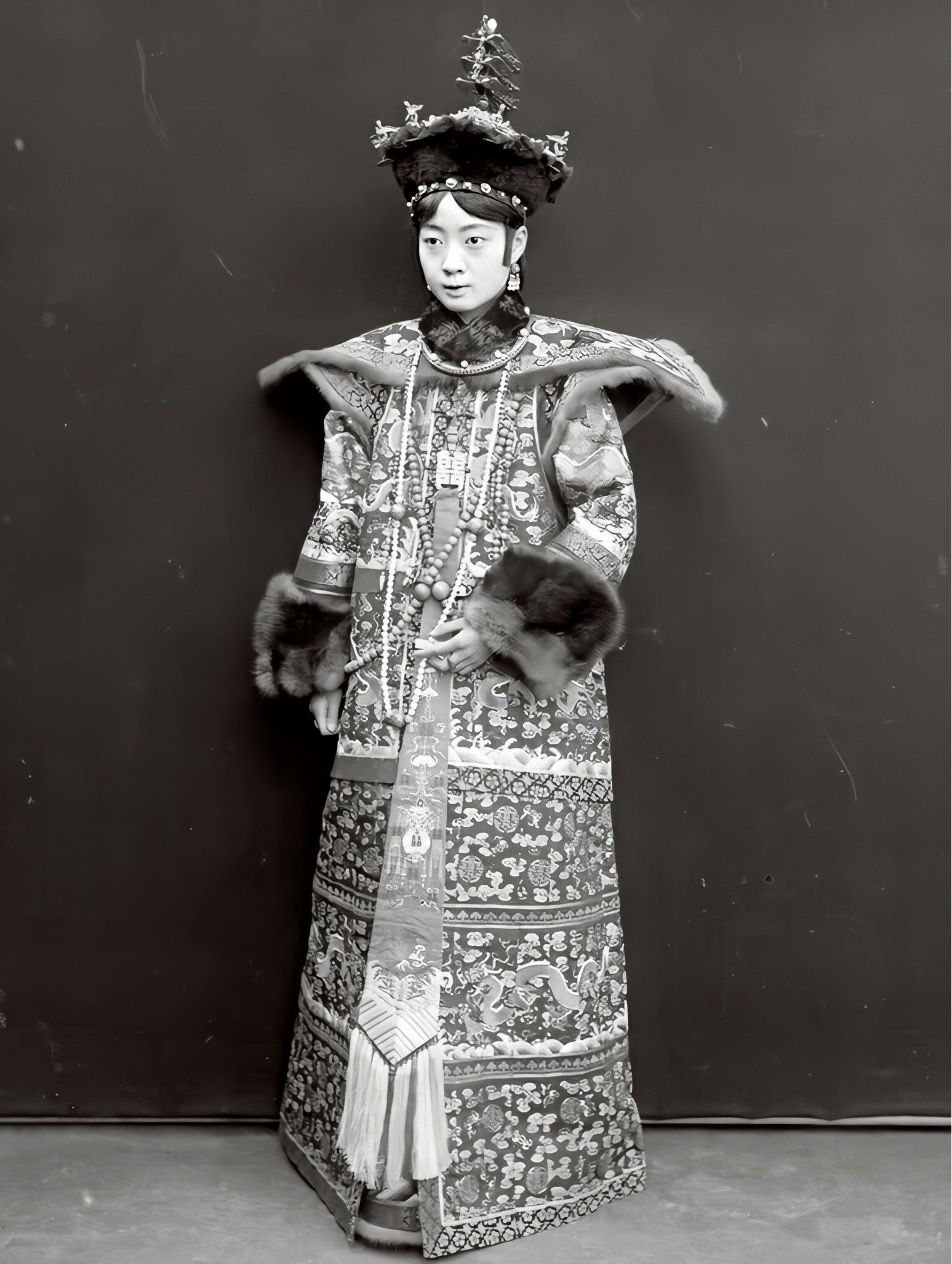
Empress Wanrong in regal dress after being conferred as Empress

Despite being Empress and having a higher position than Puyi's wedded concubine, Wenxiu, Wanrong perceived her as something of a rival. The Empress wrote at least one letter and a poem teasing and making fun of Wenxiu, who lived just 70 metres away in the Palace of Eternal Spring. The Empress would sometimes also playfully tease Puyi, calling him, in one letter, ''Henry dear little wife'' and referring to herself as ''loving husband, Elizabeth'' (In English.) One letter to Wenxiu read:

To Lady Ailian (Wenxiu): I haven't seen you for days. Are you still feeling sorry for yourself? I do want to buy a mirror for you to admire yourself in it. Here is a song composed for you to repay your sneer: Good luck to Lady Ailian. Lady Ailian is good at playing the piano. Lady Ailian is good at singing. Lady Ailian has recovered a little from her spoilt illness. Has lady Ailian taken medicine? Lady Ailian can take food well and defecate naturally. Good night to you.

A sarcastic poem written by Wanrong again shows Wanrong's feelings about Wenxiu, with it reading:

The bright moon has risen over the east wall;
The Consort Shu was sitting alone in the empty room.
The delicate swallow often dances in a lonely way;
The fair lady is absolutely unrivalled in the world.

Wanrong's problems with Wenxiu may have arisen from a suspicion Puyi had a preference for Wenxiu, with Wanrong later writing in a diary entry she suspected Puyi had a preference for her. Puyi would later describe his partners as "furniture" and "tools".

Wanrong's marriage to Puyi was unhappy but she found promise in her studies. Hu Siyuan, who later taught Wanrong classical literature in Tianjin commented "she was wise and eager to learn, quick-witted and inquisitive; she always made a thorough inquiry of the ups and downs of ancient events, had a profound understanding of the texts. My admiration of her was beyond description. If she kept on teaching herself in the palace, I believed that she would be able to refer to the past for the present and then contribute to the wise governance of the emperor."

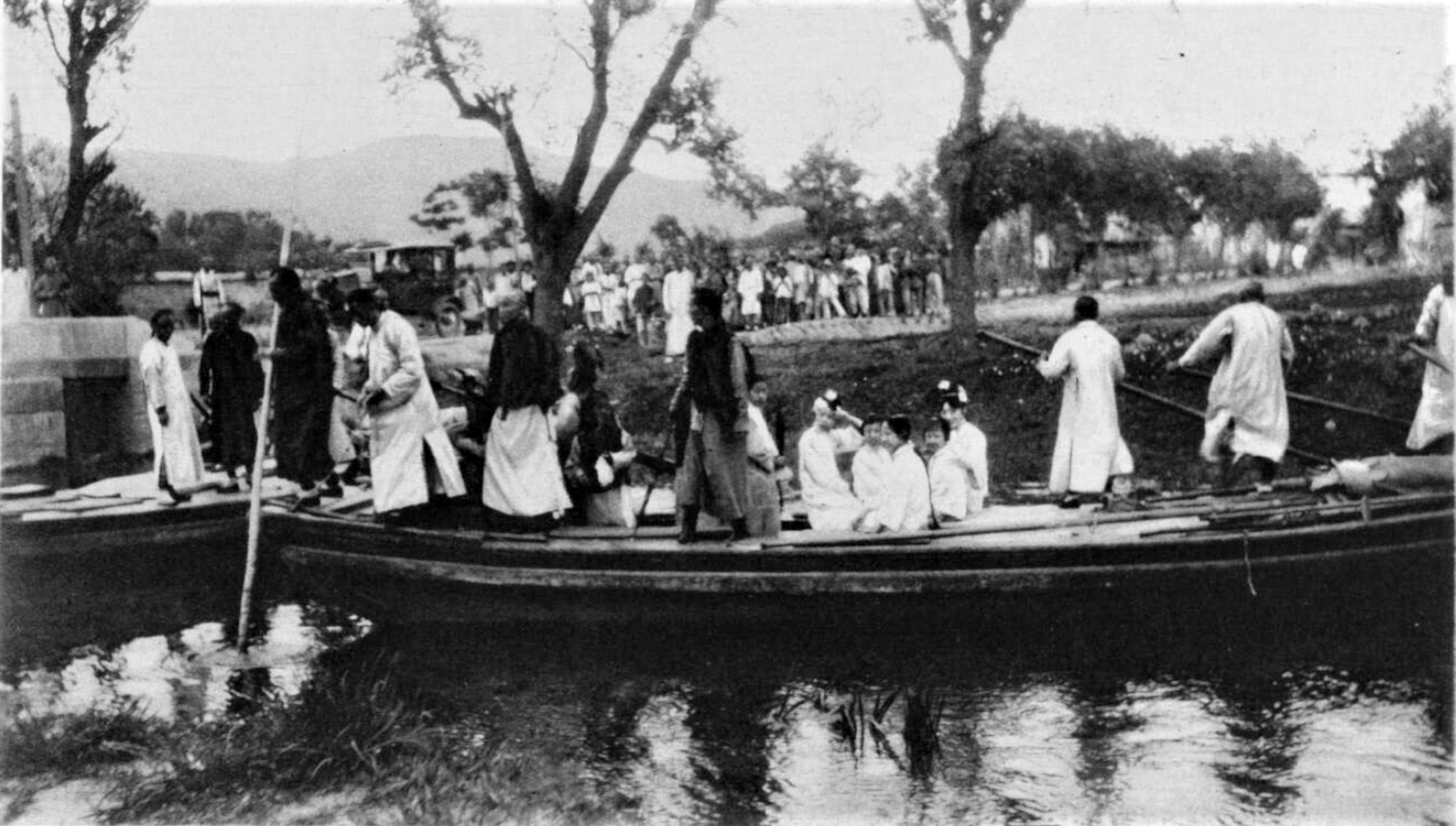
Wanrong and Wenxiu on a boat during a trip to Jade Spring Hill

Puyi, Wanrong and Wenxiu along with an entourage would occasionally leave the Forbidden City mostly to visit relatives or on a few occasions to sightsee. On one such occasion, it was reported they stopped in a garden during a visit to see his sick grandmother. The local press during 1923 reported on these outings and they appeared in newspapers. On one trip they visited the Summer Palace in April 1924. On another outing they left to have tea with Puyi's English tutor, Reginald Fleming Johnston. Time magazine said Elizabeth (Wanrong) was accompanied by Miss Isabel Ingram and Puyi was "in his element" speaking English. Pujie (Puyi's brother) said there were always several two-person palanquins waiting to carry the tutors in at the Gate of Divine Valor every afternoon when they came to teach.

At the age of eighteen or nineteen (Chinese age) she still behaved like a child in many ways and enjoyed playing games with her maids and eunuchs. She once played "drop the handkerchief" in the courtyard into nine o'clock in the evening. The Empress was reluctant to see visitors go, making them play games until everyone was thoroughly tired. Sometimes a eunuch would be summoned and be on duty for no other reason than to keep her company or play with her. Wanrong had few visitors, except for her servants and tutor, and was often lonely.

Wanrong's personal eunuch, Sun Yaoting, said Puyi would rarely spend the night with Wanrong in the Palace of Gathered Elegance. Sun said Wanrong never closed the door at night (perhaps due to loneliness), but only drew the door curtain. On rare occasions when Puyi did come the door would be closed and the maid on night watch sent away. Puyi would invariably be in a bad mood afterward. Reginald Johnston attempted to improve the relationship between Puyi and Wanrong as well as to get Wanrong's entourage to mix with Puyi's, but ultimately Johnston did not get very far. Johnston thought Puyi had been married too young.

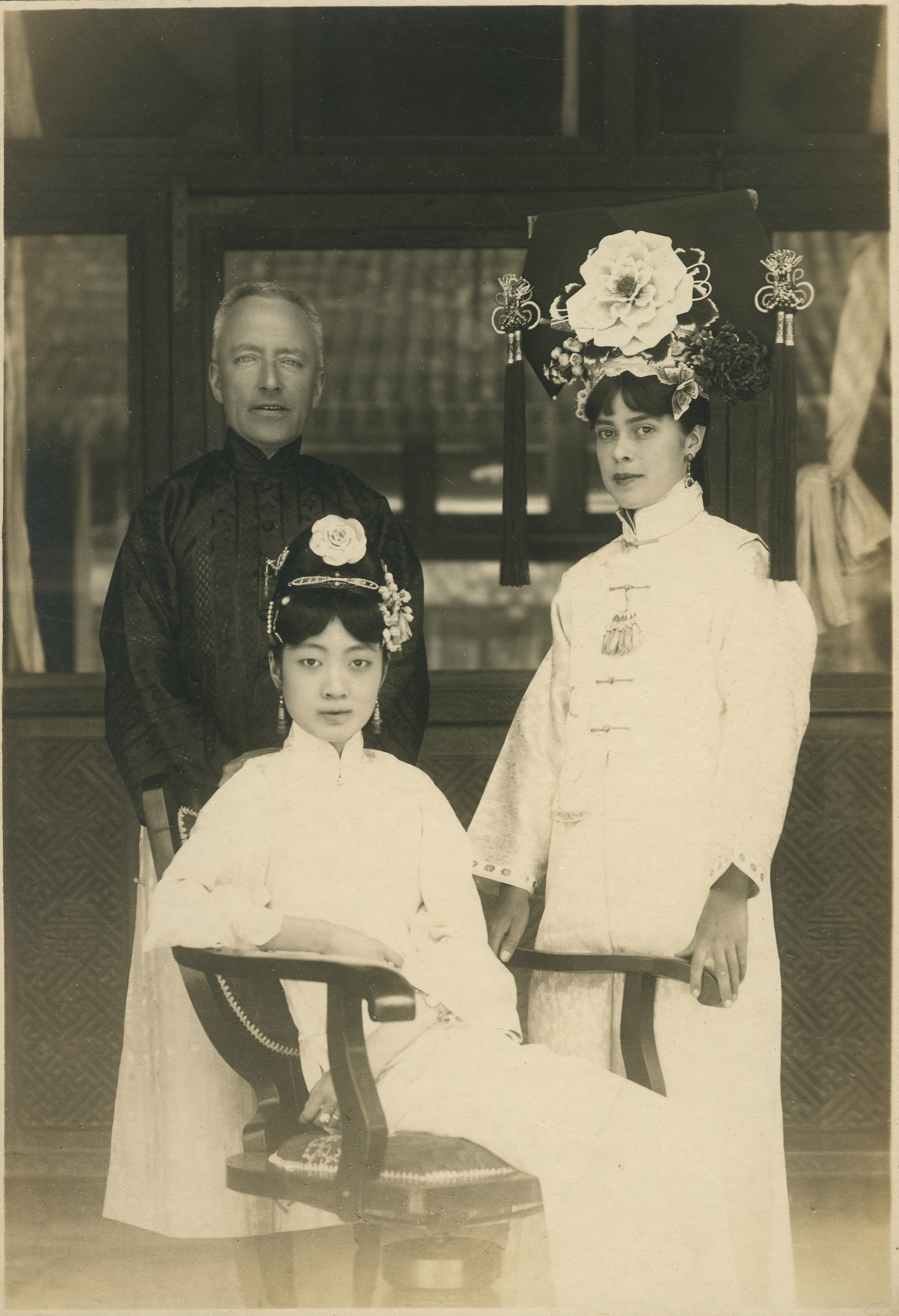
Wanrong sitting, with her tutor, Isabel Ingram, and Reginald Johnston, the tutor of her husband, Emperor Puyi, in the Forbidden City in 1924

Sun reminisced Puyi once appeared with a German-made bicycle to help Wanrong learn how to ride a bike with the eunuchs helping. During this time Puyi would come every day to see her. On one particular day, Sun was asked to have a try, with him quickly falling off, not knowing how to ride, causing everyone to laugh and clap. On another occasion he was asked to go on a swing in the veranda of the Palace of Universal Happiness, with the other eunuchs pushing vigorously, scaring him, with Wanrong finding the situation to be humorous. The Empress on the other hand was brave enough to stand up while the swing was moving.

Wanrong would send subordinates on occasion to donate money to the poor outside the Forbidden City. In December 1923 she received praise when she donated 600 yuan to a charity.

Smoking became a habit for the Empress; she began with cigarettes and eventually opium, although initially it was for severe stomach ache as well as headaches. According to Wang Qingxiang, author of the book The Last Emperor and His Five Wives, her headaches were actually a ''mind'' problem. Wanrong may have suffered from a form of hereditary psychosis. Wanrong's father, Rongyuan, is said to have had schizophrenia and treated it with opium.

== Life in Tianjin ==
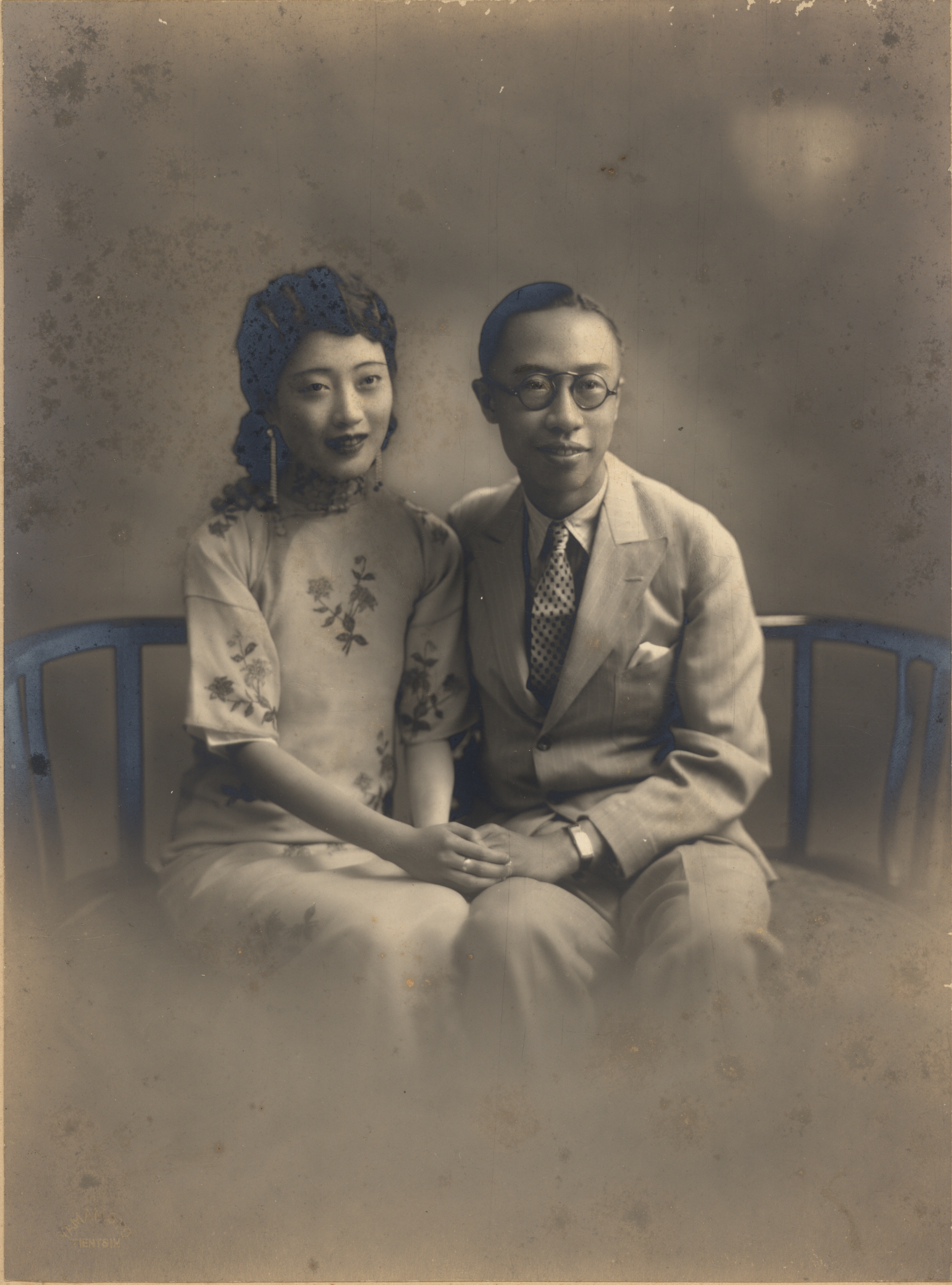
Wanrong and Puyi 1925-1931

In October 1924, the warlord Feng Yuxiang seized control of Beijing in a coup. He forced Puyi and his family out of the Forbidden City on 5 November. Wanrong's tutor, Ingram, spoke of seeing the soldiers outside as she came to enter and said of the time period: "...That day was the end of my beautiful China... In my country (China), a steam train is still a fire-spitting demon, electricity is the eye of the devil, motor cars which are not uncommon, still elicit a dubious and suspicious response from the inland Chinese. It has all come so suddenly. The Chinese are being Europeanized with one majestic blow. And that blow has killed the beautiful spiritual quality of the country. It is, at present, a chaotic and uncertain land."

Wanrong and Puyi in the Japanese Legation in Beijing, November 1924

Puyi, Wanrong and Wenxiu stayed at the house of Puyi's father after being exiled, the Prince Chun Mansion in Beijing. Puyi then secretly took refuge in the Japanese Legation in Beijing. Puyi later moved out of Beijing to the Japanese concession in Tianjin on 24 February 1925. Wanrong and Wenxiu later followed him and arrived on 27 February. Puyi and Wanrong settled in the Zhang garden in Tianjin later moving in 1929 to the Quiet Garden Villa (Jing garden) within the Japanese concession in Tianjin.

In the villa, they lived in relative peace and enjoyed an active public and social life. Wanrong began smoking opium recreationally, but quickly became addicted. Her perceived temper problems may have been one of the reasons for remaining passive to the problem, however, smoking opium at this time was not unusual. Li Guoxing, who had served under Puyi for over 30 years, said while Wanrong was ''shrewish'' (translated from: 泼辣) she was kind-hearted and friendly to servants.

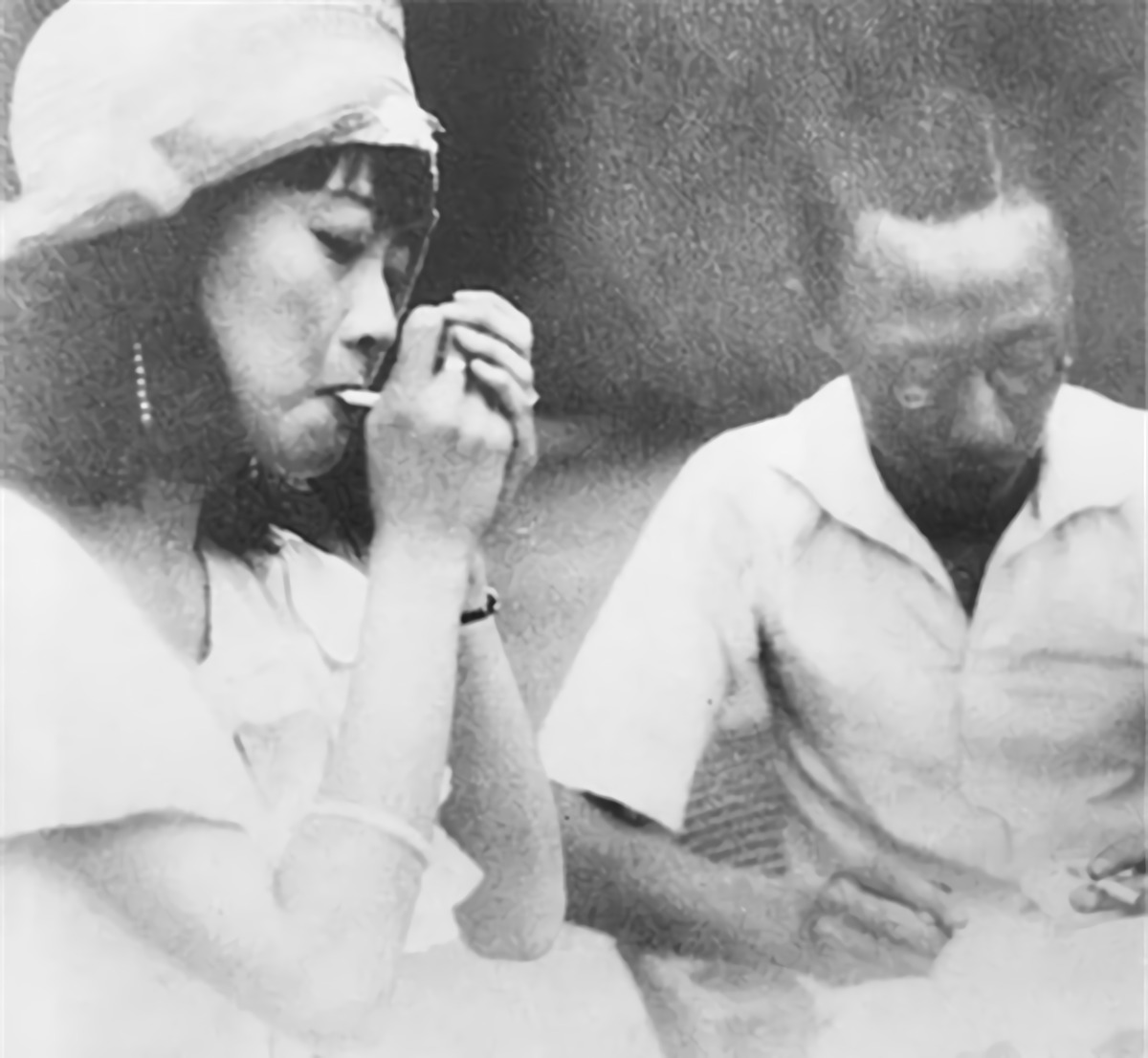
Wanrong smoking a cigarette, Japanese concession, Tianjin

Wanrong found various avenues for entertainment in Tianjin: theatre, dancing, skating, horse-riding, sports, shopping, and more. She was a heavy shopper – shopping was a technique she used to compete with Wenxiu for Puyi's affection and attention. Puyi would frequently take Wanrong to the Xinming Theater to enjoy operas. Wanrong's friend Shuh Yun was invited on one occasion to play mahjong tiles at the Zhang Garden. Shuh Yun recalled she would go on sightseeing trips with her. She apparently did not participate in activities like dancing in the ball, nor did she buy any sweepstakes, she did not ride a horse or play balls. They had previously visited the International Jockey Club and the ballroom of West Lake Restaurant. Though, she mostly just enjoyed observing out of curiosity.

Whenever Puyi bought something for one of them, the other would insist Puyi also buy it for her too. Puyi also showed a preference for Wanrong and spent more time with her, which eventually led to Wenxiu divorcing him in 1931.

When the 1931 Yellow River floods broke out, Wanrong donated one of her pearl necklaces to be sold for relief funds.

=== Tianjin diary entries ===
Wanrong kept a diary while in Tianjin and wrote numerous entries about Wenxiu, her illnesses, and her neglect at the hands of Puyi.

On 2 May 1931, she wrote:

Oh, my beloved! What shall I do? If I suffer for myself, though I have to stay in bed due to illness, I would still feel comfortable. If others suffer for me, I would not know what to do. Oh, my beloved! I have no idea what's in your mind. While I recall the past days, it makes me suffer from a kind of hatred. They should not have married me to a man with a wife. During those years in the Zhang Garden, I suspected that my darling loved the Consort Shu more than me and my heart was broken by that. Deep in sorrow, I wept day and night all the time, which caused me to suffer from algomenorrhea (period pains) and diarrhoea in no less than a hundred days. As a result, it makes me suffer from panasthenia today. However, I have never spoken it out, nor have I complained about anybody. Every day I had to wear a full smile when meeting others, so no one could detect how much bitterness I was suffering in my heart!

On 25 June 1931, she wrote:

My darling told me that I could fall in love with others I said: "No! Stop that nonsense. You once said that if we couldn't settle the problem at present, it would be settled on some day in the later years. Tell me how sorry I would be to hear that at that time! I do not want to fall in love with any others" And then I added: "you had a dream that day... you were so sad. Once you were here, you asked me to fall in love with others, but for this you always looked sad. What's the reason for that?" Oh, my god! My dear! Is he also in the same situation as me? Is he also trying to keep his sorrow at the bottom of his heart and not wanting to speak it out? I really can do nothing about that! By Rong Yuehua (note: a temporary name for Wanrong). At Mao Period (one of the 12 two-hour periods of a day; it indicates the period from 5 am. to 7 a m.) of lunar May 10.

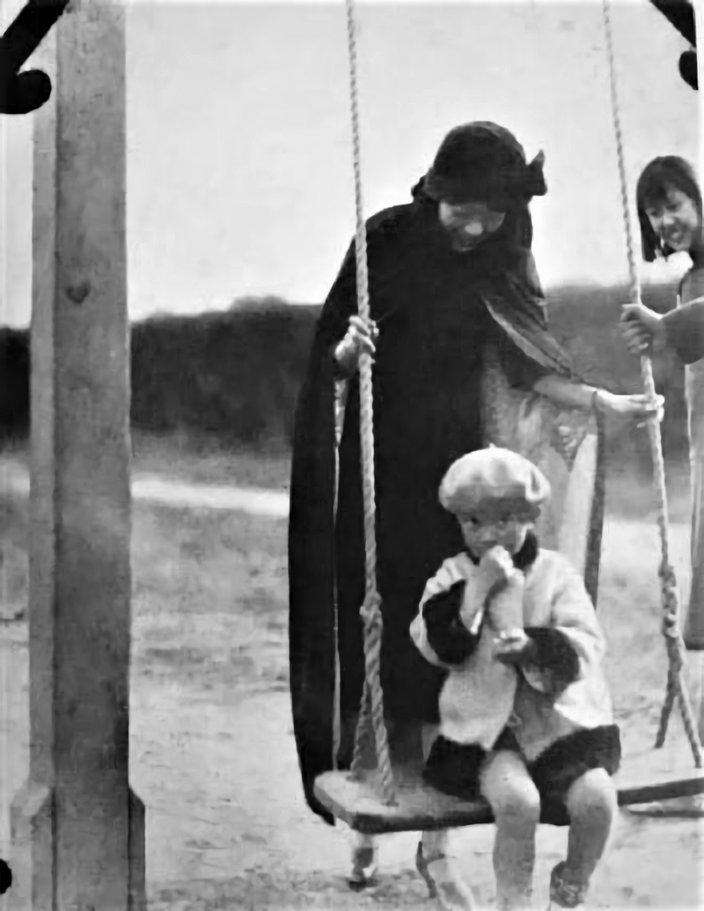
Wanrong playing with a child

In an undated entry, she wrote:

No expecting. No longing. No teasing in the dark. Well-behaved and keep on being a virgin girl. Bear in mind manners and shames. Keep my virginity. No matter how hard the Eastern wind was blowing the tender bamboo with "jies," but it can do nothing with its "jie" even if its life comes to and end! (note: a pun, "jie" here means a "node" of the bamboo tree on the surface. But it means Wanrong's loyalty to Puyi in fact.)

In Wanrong's journal entry of 30 April 1931, she said she was seriously ill three times during her seven years in Tianjin. According to her journals, she still had several chronic diseases such as "panasthenia" (neurasthenia) and irregular menstruation. Despite Puyi's insistence in a discussion about illness and the effects of opium on pregnancy, as noted in Wanrong's diary entry of 30 September 1931, she continued to smoke opium.

On 1 October 1931, she wrote, referencing Wenxiu's asking for divorce with Puyi as treason, "It was the lunar 20 August. The Emperor talked about the treasonous act with me. I asked: 'is what was said in the press true?' The Emperor said: 'it's nothing but rumors.'" Wanrong further wrote in another entry on the same day, recounting what she had told Puyi: "...I said: If you live alone I would know that. If you always find some excuse for going out alone, I would know that you have allowed her to live alone. If you go to see her, I would also know about it."

Puyi noted in his memoir he began to feel "great resentment" for Wanrong after she drove Wenxiu away and consequently neglected her, to the point that they almost never spoke to each other.

== As empress of Manchukuo ==
Late in 1931, Yoshiko Kawashima, acting under instruction from the Japanese Kwantung Army, fetched Wanrong from Tianjin to Dalian and then to Port Arthur (now Lüshun) to meet Puyi who had accepted an offer from the Empire of Japan to head the puppet state of Manchukuo in Manchuria (northeastern China) in the hope of restoring the Qing dynasty. Wanrong disliked the Japanese and was firmly against Puyi's plans to go to Manchuria, and for a moment Puyi hesitated, leading Kenji Doihara to send for Puyi's cousin, the very pro-Japanese Kawashima, to visit him to change his mind. After Puyi had snuck into Manchuria, Li Guoxiong (a servant) claims Wanrong had told him: "As you see, His Majesty had left and His Highness could not come here. I was deserted here and who would take care of me?" Yoshiko Kawashima, noted for their strong will, had some influence on Wanrong and she eventually secretly relocated to Manchukuo. However, a member of Wanrong's entourage later said Yoshiko Kawashima had only played a minor role.

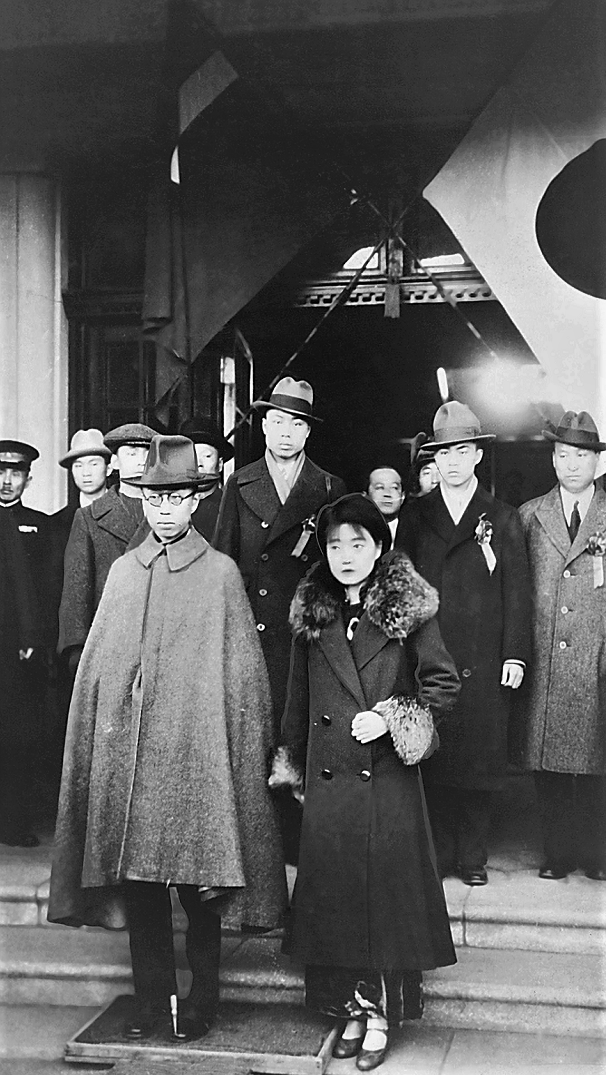
Puyi and Wanrong leaving their hotel on 8 March 1932 before setting off for the official Manchukuo founding ceremony in Xinjing (Changchun). Li Tiyu is pictured behind Puyi.

Wanrong and her group landed at Dalian on 28 November 1931. Initially the Japanese military did not allow Puyi and Wanrong to stay together, with Wanrong's requests to visit Puyi being declined. Kudo Tetsuaburo, who worked as a guard for Puyi, stated there was a rumor the emperor had been killed and another rumor he had been put under house arrest. Wanrong was eventually allowed to visit Puyi in Lushun. It is possible the Japanese military initially feared Puyi could be influenced by those around him at such a critical stage of development and were hesitant to allow them to live together. Prince Su's Mansion in Lushun served as Puyi's temporary palace in which Wanrong would spend a few months before settling in Xinjing (Changchun). Li Guoxing, Puyi's servant recalled she acted like a spoiled child on several occasions.

After arriving in Xinjing, Wanrong was closely monitored by the Japanese and had to do as they instructed. She began to detest the Japanese and secretly planned to escape on two occasions. Wellington Koo, a diplomat, recalled in his memoirs when he was in Dalian, he once met a man who said he was sent by Wanrong to seek his help in escaping from Xinjing. Koo could not help her because of his status as a consultant then. Koo later wrote in his memoir "...My attendant said that he knew this man in Beijing and that he could meet him. He told me that this man was disguised as an antique dealer to avoid the attention of the Japanese (perhaps he had been an antique dealer). I went out to the porch and we stopped at the corner. The man told me that he was sent by the Empress. He said she asked me to help her escape from Changchun because she knew I was going to Manchuria; he said she felt miserable about her life because she was surrounded by Japanese attendants in the palace (there were no Chinese attendants there), and her every move was watched and denounced. She knew that the emperor could not escape, and if she could, she could have helped him to escape." In another incident, around August or September 1933, when the wife of Zhao Xinbo (趙欣伯), a Manchukuo official, was preparing to leave for Japan, Wanrong approached her and asked her for help. However, Wanrong's plan to escape was again unsuccessful. In frustration, the Empress was noted to have been heard saying on one occasion: "Why can everyone else be free, but I can't be free?"

On 1 March 1934, the Japanese government proclaimed Puyi as the emperor of Manchukuo and Wanrong as his empress. The couple lived in the Russian-built Weihuang Palace (now the Museum of the Imperial Palace of the Manchu State), a tax office that had been converted into a temporary palace while a new structure was being built. Apart from Puyi's coronation in 1934, Wanrong only made one other public appearance as Empress of Manchukuo, in June 1934, when Prince Chichibu visited Manchukuo on behalf of the Shōwa Emperor to mark close ties between Japan and Manchukuo. While these were the only big state ceremonies she participated in, she is noted to have made smaller public appearances; in the non-fiction book Wild Swans, she was noted to have participated in the official visit of the Emperor to Jinzhou in September 1939, where the mother of the author was selected to present flowers to the Empress on her arrival to the city.

Puyi and Wanrong leaving their hotel before their departure to Xinjing by train

According to the 1934 "Imperial Palace" archives, Wanrong made 27 pieces of cheongsam in one year. She was also taught drawing and music, such as the piano as well as playing chess and tennis recreationally. Cui Huimei who taught Wanrong recalled: "We sisters taught the empress Wanrong drawing and music, but I remembered the empress Wanrong taught us to sing a song. It was the national anthem of the Qing Dynasty. The lyrics were dismal.."

On 21 November 1934, The New York Times wrote an article stating that: "due to nervous illness, Empress Yueh Hua [pen name used by Wanrong] will soon leave the capital to spend the Winter at Dairen."

Puyi became a devout Buddhist in the Manchukuo period, reading many books and sutras on the topic and had developed superstitions to the point where he would not allow his staff to kill a single fly. Puyi wrote Wanrong became so engrossed in these superstitions she would blink and spit unnecessarily, tellingly, as if she was mentally ill.

=== Secret affairs and mental health decline ===
Puyi and Wanrong's relationship continued to deteriorate, albeit with continuing formalities such as Wanrong paying tribute to the emperor. Puyi would sometimes sit in her bedroom before he slept and would leave at midnight unreluctantly, which infuriated Wanrong. She is said to have thrown objects around in a rage. Due to Puyi's neglect and her loneliness in Manchukuo, Wanrong took to smoking tobacco mixed with small doses of opium as a relaxant. Over time, she became a heavy opium addict. Between 10 July 1938 and 10 July 1939, Wanrong reportedly purchased over 740 ounces of opium, which was estimated to be around 2 ounces a day, if all consumed. Her monthly spending also increased by twice the original amount, with most going towards buying opium and large numbers of fashion and movie magazines.

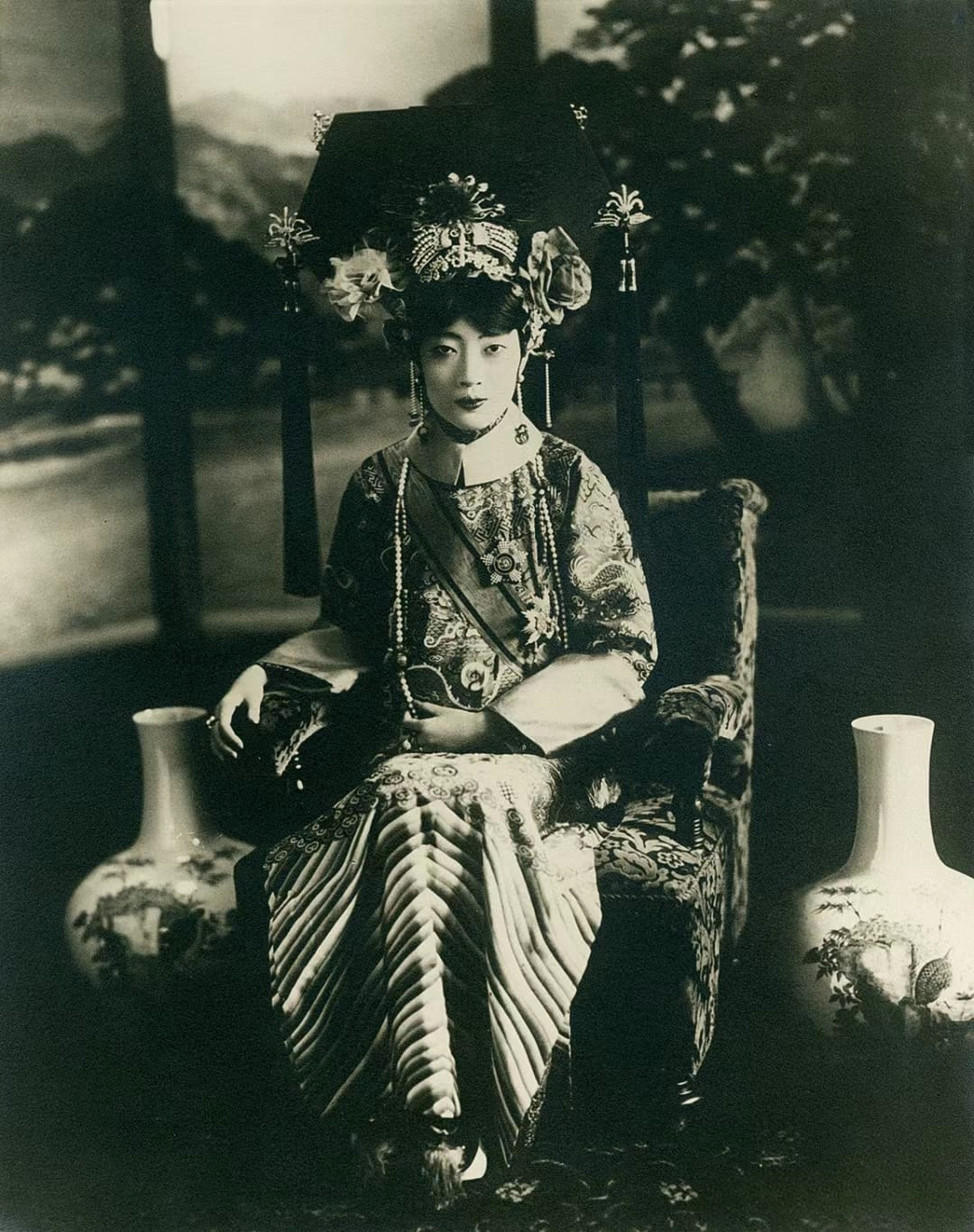
Wanrong as empress of Manchukuo (1934)

While Puyi was absent, out of loneliness, the opium-addicted empress had secret affairs with two of Puyi's aides in Manchukuo's Imperial Palace, Li Tiyu (李體玉) and Qi Jizhong (祁繼忠). Puyi had Qi sent to a military school in Japan just under a year after arriving in Changchun. On one occasion, Puyi noticed another of his attendants, Li Tiyu, had lipstick on and questioned him as to why he was wearing it, with Li Tiyu responding he had been pale-lipped and wanted to make it look pleasant to the "Lord of Ten Thousand Years." His answer caused an uproar of laughter, but Li subsequently always wore lipstick. In another instance, Puyi beat him after becoming suspicious of where he was during the night when his bed was found to be empty. Li told the emperor that he had been sleeping with the wife of one of his guards. The emperor finally ran out of patience with Li and banished him from the palace.

Puyi attempted to divorce Wanrong, but the Kwantung Army disapproved. He later tried issuing a proclamation about going to Lushun on 21 January 1935 to "avoid the cold," likely with the intention of abandoning Wanrong, but the Japanese saw through his plans and prevented him from leaving. Wanrong reportedly discovered the plot and was deeply upset. Wang Qingyuan, an attendant for Puyi, said that the emperor had a strict rule that Wanrong was not allowed to contact the outside world.

Wanrong gave birth to an illegitimate child, a girl, but the baby was killed on delivery, and the newborn was supposedly thrown into a boiler. Wanrong was immediately removed by Puyi's Japanese handlers to a remote hospital. There are two accounts of what happened to Wanrong after her daughter's death. One account said Puyi lied to her, saying her daughter was being raised by a nanny, and Wanrong never knew about her daughter's death. The other account said Wanrong found out or knew about her daughter's infanticide and lived in a constant daze of opium consumption thereafter. In Puyi's unabridged memoir he wrote, "[...] she was told he had been adopted and remained dreaming of her son living in the world until her dying day." It is possible Puyi was simply aware of what would happen to the baby, and was too cowardly to do anything about it.

Wanrong was eventually confined to her quarters at all times, with only a handful of servants permitted to attend her. Wang Jianzhai, a man who had worked at the Palace, claimed Puyi had shackled Wanrong in order to prevent her moving around with ease and said the sound of chains on the floor could often be heard as they walked by her room. After a long time, the chains were removed. It is not known how long she was kept under house arrest.

Wanrong's father eventually stopped visiting her in Manchukuo. Runqi, her brother, said her father loved her greatly and could not bear to face what Wanrong had become. The empress by then had taken to smoking two packets of cigarettes a day along with smoking large quantities of opium, using the cheapest pipes available. Hiro Saga, the wife of Puyi's brother, wrote about the empress at a shared dinner in 1937, noting:

"The empress was seated to my right, and while I was watching, she kept on taking more and more turkey for herself. I was surprised at her good appetite. Perhaps to make sure that I didn't catch on to what was happening, her young brother Runqi went so far as to rudely grab the chocolate from the person next to him. He kept on eating in a comical way to turn everyone's attention toward him. Afterward I found out that the empress was an opium addict and often suffered from bouts of mental instability. She just wasn't aware of how much she was eating."

In another incident, Puyi's sister wrote to Puyi in 1937 and said of Wanrong's appearance: "The enlarged photo of (the queen) is really terrible, it's changed since the last two years. It's hidden and not shown to others." After 1937, she no longer appeared at New Year or birthday parties.

Wanrong became unpredictable, refusing to wash or groom herself. Her toenails were no longer cut, bending around into the flesh of her feet, and her teeth became discolored due to chronic smoking. The empress became extremely skinny and her hair was eventually cut short, making her resemble a "hedgehog".

Empress Wanrong taking part in processions during 1934

Yang Jingzhu (楊景竹), the wife of one of Puyi's relatives, Yuzhan (毓嶦), claimed she found Wanrong's personal maid, Chunying, crying in the Palace. Upon asking her what was wrong, the maid had told her the empress had threatened to beat her if she did not eat a cookie that Wanrong had smeared with her own menstrual blood. In another instance, she was seen frantically running outside into the courtyard dressed in her pajamas and had to be dragged back inside by a eunuch. A maid present at the palace also recalled Wanrong laughing and crying frequently, and often appeared naked, although it is unclear if this meant full nudity or undergarments. The empress went so far as to send servants on more than one occasion to buy lottery tickets with financial records showing the purchase and price of lottery tickets.

When Wanrong was mentally lucid she is said to have cried and cursed her father, accusing him of ruining her life. It is claimed in her later years she struggled to walk and her eyesight severely deteriorated (likely due to an untreated eye disease) and found brightness to be uncomfortable. She would use a folded fan to block her face when she looked at others, trying to look through the cracks. Wanrong was so isolated in the last years of her life that Puyi's concubine, Li Yuqin, who arrived in 1943, only saw her face during the collapse of the regime in 1945.

== Imprisonment and death ==
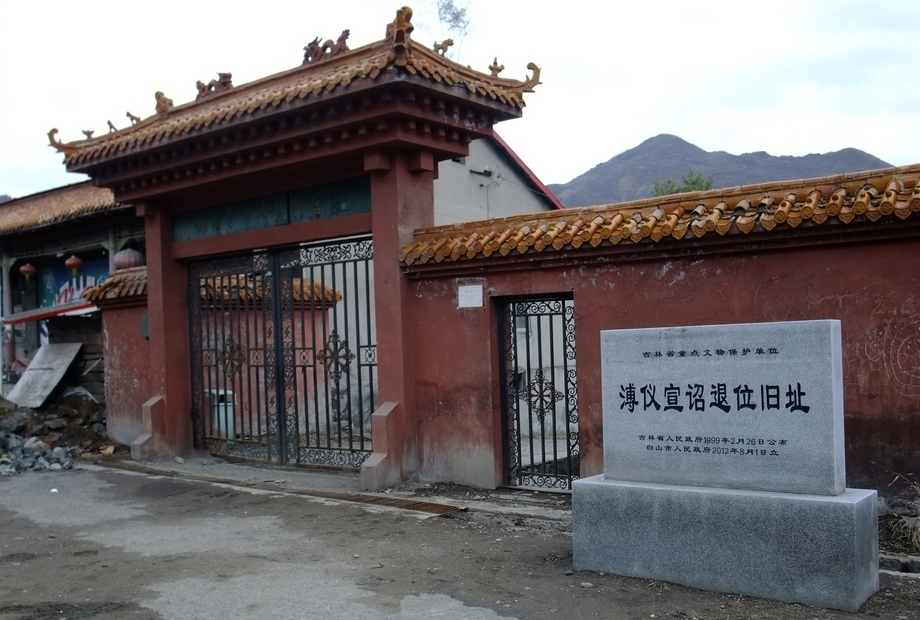
The site of Puyi's abdication in a small mining office complex in Dalizi

In August 1945, during the evacuation of Manchukuo in the midst of the Soviet invasion of Manchuria, Puyi attempted to evacuate his household beyond the reach of the Soviets. Puyi, Wanrong, and their entourage moved from Xinjing to Dalizi (also romanised as Talizou) by train; from there, Puyi departed alone to Tonghua, where he took a plane to Mukden. He left behind Wanrong, his concubine Li Yuqin, and other imperial household members in Dalizi (大栗子鎮). Wanrong, along with her sister-in-law Hiro, sought passage to Korea but were soon captured by Communist guerillas (in present-day Linjiang, Jilin) in January 1946.

Soviet soldiers quickly arrived in Dalizi and came into contact with Wanrong's entourage, telling Prince Pujian, a relative of Puyi's, that they had come to liberate Northeast China as well as asking to see the Empress. The officers briefly met Li Yuqin and Wanrong before departing, leaving the group undetained.

Wanrong and her group later moved from Dalizi to settle in Linjian county, where they settled in a local hotel due to the cold and problems such as the running water icing up. On one occasion, Li Yuqin went to see Wanrong who reached out her thin arm, making a wave to sit on her bedside. Eunuchs said this was unprecedented and nobody had before been offered a seat. Wanrong let out two noises, "Heh! heh!" Li Yuqin recalled: "My grief was unbearable and I was in tears. Her eyes showed a panicked and anxious look..."

Eventually, they were transferred back to Changchun by Chinese Communists under the command of He Changgong, who had discovered them. Li Yuqin, Puyi's concubine, was later taken back by her family, but Wanrong had no place to settle down, as her father was in prison and her brother had abandoned her. She had no choice but to move around with the army. According to Behr in his book The Last Emperor, Li Yuqin supposedly offered Wanrong a place to stay at her home, but her mother having no sympathy alerted Communist party officials, who had the group arrested. In any case, when the military left Changchun, they took Wanrong with them.

Hiro Saga wrote about her time at the Jilin prison saying: "All day long, the Empress rolled around on the wooden floor, screaming and moaning like a mad woman, her eyes were wide with agony. She could only feed herself, but she could no longer defecate by herself." While experiencing the symptoms of opium withdrawal in Jilin, Wanrong was cared for in her most frail and vulnerable state by her sister-in-law, Saga Hiro. Wanrong, because she was the former empress, was put on display in the jail as if she was in a zoo, and people came from miles around to watch her. During this time, Wanrong suffered from hallucinations and made demands for more opium and imaginary servants. In one incident, she spoke in a commanding tone to the prison guards, who laughed at her in response. The general hatred for Puyi meant few had any sympathy for Wanrong, who was seen as another Japanese collaborator, and a guard told Lady Saga "this one won't last," making it a waste of time feeding her. Due to the Chinese Civil War, Wanrong and Saga were moved to a prison in Yanji.

Saga, recalling Wanrong's final days alive, wrote: "I looked through the small window and saw to my surprise that the Empress had fallen from her bunk onto the concrete floor and her food had been left by the far entrance for days. The smell of urine was horrible."

An order was issued on 10 June to move Wanrong, Saga Hiro and their entourage to Mudanjiang and then to Jiamusi. Wanrong was unable to walk and the man in charge of the prison said it would be best to leave Wanrong, in case she died on the way. Wanrong's last days were spent without any relatives or friends. She died at the age of 39 on 20 June 1946 in Yanji, Jilin province, from the effects of malnutrition and opium withdrawal in a pool of her own bodily fluids. Her place of burial is unknown. Some said she was wrapped in a piece of cloth and discarded in the hills north of Yanji, though it is thought she was more likely buried in the south of Yanji. Her remains were never found.

Three years later, Puyi learned from a letter written by Saga Hiro to Pujie that Wanrong had died. He was emotionless. Puyi wrote in his memoir: "The experiences of Wanrong, who had been neglected by me for so long, would be incomprehensible to a modern Chinese girl. If her fate was not determined at her birth, her end was the inevitable result of her marriage to me. I often thought that if she had divorced me in Tianjin as Wenxiu had done, she might have escaped her fate. But she was quite different from Wenxiu. To Wenxiu a normal man-woman relationship was more important than status or medieval pomp. Wanrong, however, attached great significance to her position as Empress and she was therefore willing to be a wife in name only."

== Cenotaph ==
On 23 October 2006, Wanrong's younger brother, Runqi, conducted a ritual burial for his sister at the Western Qing tombs. A photo owned by Runqi was buried there. A hand mirror which belonged to Wanrong, owned by Runqi, was selected with hopes for it to be placed in a museum.

== Song ==
"Paper Kite" by Wanrong

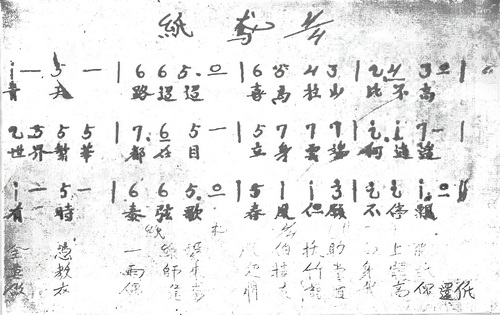
Score composed by Wanrong

Wanrong wrote a song called "Paper Kite" between 1922 and 1924.

=== Lyric ===
青天 路迢迢 喜馬拉山 比不高
世界繁華 都在目 立身雲端 何逍遙
有時 奏弦歌 春風但願 不停飄
全憑 一線牽 風伯扶住 向上飛
莫教雨師 來迎接 竹當身體 紙做衣
偶逢 春朋友 語道你高 我還低

Under the blue sky, an endless journey lies before me, even the Himalayas seems shorter from where I stand
I can see the entire bustling world, yet standing atop the clouds, how can I be truly free and unfettered?
Sometimes I sing to the melody, and I wish the winds of spring will not stop, so I can continue to fly
Only connected through one thin thread, flying upwards thanks to help from the wind god
Don't call the rains to come welcome me, bamboo as the body and paper as clothes
Sometimes in spring I happened to meet friends (along the way), that told me I was high and they were low.

== Ancestry ==
Ancestors of Wanrong (Part I)

Qianlong Emperor (1711–1799)
Yonghuang (1728–1750)
Imperial Noble Consort Zhemin
Miande (1747–1786)
Lady Ilari
Yichun (1767–1816)
Lady Irgen Gioro
Zaiming (1795–1840)
Lady Irgen Gioro

Ancestors of Wanrong (Part II)

Zaiming (1795–1840)
Puxu (1831–1907)
Lady Lin
Yuzhang (1851–1903)
Lady Egiya
Lady Aisin-Gioro
Lady Borjigit
Wanrong (1904–1946)
Xilinbu (西林布)
Rongyuan (1884–1951)

Wanrong and Puyi were both descendants of the Qianlong Emperor, this family tree shows the relationships between them and their siblings before they married.

Family tree of Wanrong & Puyi

Legend:

- – Emperors of Qing dynasty
- – Prince Ding of the First Rank
- – Prince Chun of the First Rank

Hongli 弘曆; 1711 – 1799; Qianlong Emperor
1	15
Yonghuang 永璜; 1728 – 1750; Prince Ding An of the First Rank 定安親王 (title posthumously)	Yongyan 顒琰; 1760 – 1820; Jiaqing Emperor
1	2
Miande 綿德; 1747 – 1786; Beizi 貝子; 1784 – 1786	Minning 旻寧; 1782 – 1850; Daoguang Emperor
1	7
Yichun 奕純; 1767 – 1816; Beizi 貝子; 1786 – 1816	Yixuan 奕譞; 1840 – 1891; Prince Chun Xian of the First Rank 醇賢親王; 1872 – 1891
3	5
Zaiming 載銘; 1795 – 1840; Third Class Bulwark General 三等輔國將軍; 1816 – 1840	Zaifeng 載灃; 1883 – 1951; Prince Chun of the First Rank 醇親王; 1891 – 1912
5	1	1	3
Puxu 溥煦; 1831 – 1907; Prince Ding Shen of the Second Rank 定慎郡王; 1854 – 1907	Puyi 溥儀; 1906 – 1967	Yunying 韞媖; 1909 – 1925	Yunying 韞穎; 1913 – 1992
2	1
Yulang 毓朗; 1864 – 1922; Beile Minda 敏達貝勒; 1907 – 1922	Yuzhang 毓長; 1851 – 1903; Defender General 鎮國將軍; 1872 – 1903
2	4
Hengxiang 恆香	Rongyuan 榮源	Hengxin 恒馨
2	1	1
Runqi 潤麒	Runliang 潤良	Wanrong 婉容; 1904 – 1946

== Awards and honours ==
Styles of Xuantong Empress
- Reference style: Her Imperial Majesty
- Spoken style: Your Imperial Majesty
- Alternative style: Empress Consort (Titular)

- Grand Order of the Orchid Blossom (Manchukuo, 19 April 1934)
- Order of the Precious Crown (Japan, 6 June 1934)

== Siblings ==
Wanrong had two brothers. The elder one, Runliang (潤良; 1904–1925), married Puyi's first sister, Yunying (not to be confused with Jin Yunying) (韞媖; 1909–1925). They had no children. Wanrong's younger brother, Runqi (潤麒; 1912–2007), married Puyi's third sister, Yunying (韞穎; 1913–1992). They had two sons and a daughter.

== Portrayal in media ==
Wanrong was portrayed by Joan Chen in Bernardo Bertolucci's 1987 film The Last Emperor，as well as Idy Chan in The Last Princess of Manchuria

In 2005, at the age of 93, Runqi, Wanrong's brother, angered at how the media and drama crews had portrayed his sister, sued, saying, "As long as I live, I will not allow irresponsible fabrications and even personal insults about Wanrong's life story! Insulting!" As late as the 2000s, Runqi said Wanrong's sad face when she was designated as Empress still lingered in his mind.

== See also ==
- Ranks of imperial consorts in the Qing Dynasty
- Royal and noble ranks of the Qing dynasty
- Female infanticide in China
- Wanrong Wikimedia photos

=== Notes ===
Wanrong Gobulo Clan
Chinese royalty
Vacant Republican era Title last held by Herself as titular Empress consort of the Qing dynasty	Empress consort of China; Manchukuo; 1 March 1934 – 17 August 1945	Monarchy abolished Manchukuo was ended in 1945
Titles in pretence
Preceded by Monarchy abolished Jingfen, Empress Xiaodingjing as actual empress consort	— TITULAR — Empress consort of China; Qing dynasty 30 November 1922 – 5 November 1924; Reason for succession failure: Qing dynasty was ended in 1912	Vacant Imperial title abolished Title next held by Herself as Empress consort of Manchukuo
