= Runqi =

Chinese Manchu noble (1912–2007)

Gobulo Runqi
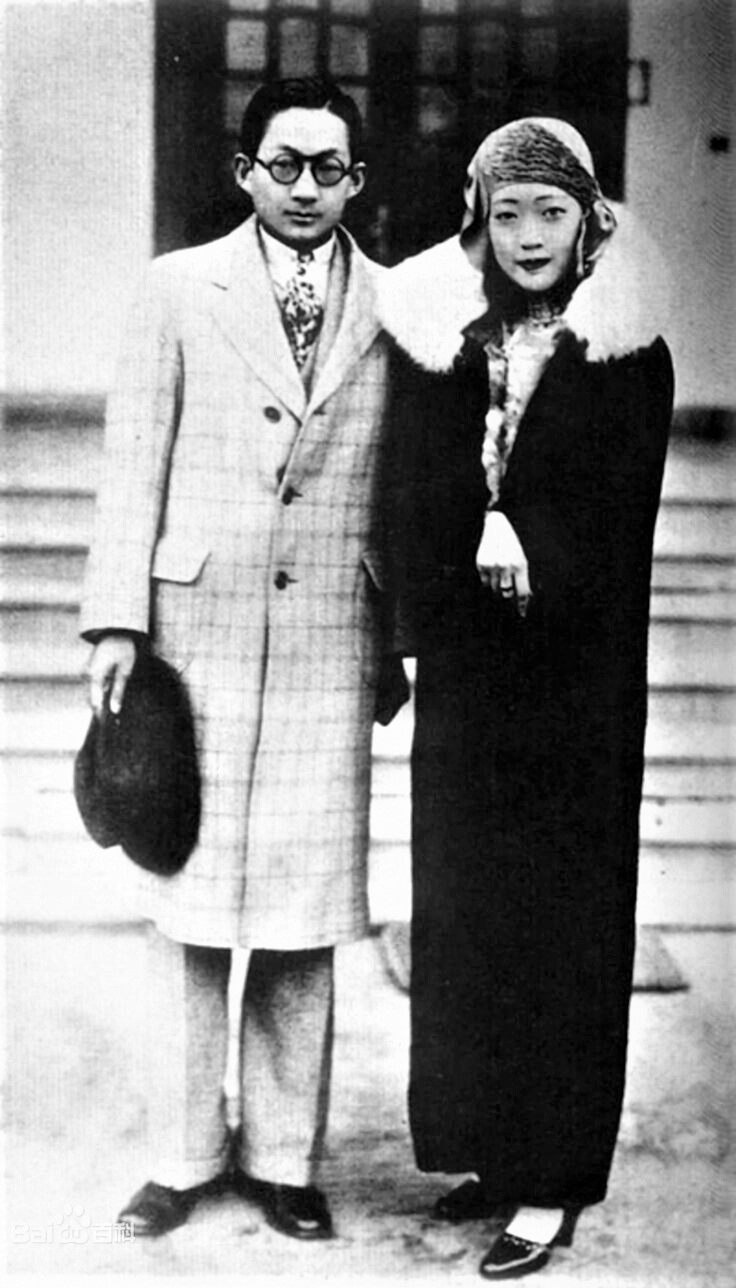
- Runqi pictured with Wanrong at the Garden of Serenity (c. 1929-1931)
- Born: Gobulo Runqi (郭布羅潤麒); July 8, 1912; China
- Died: June 6, 2007 (aged 94); China
- Spouse: Jin Yunying
- House: Gobulo (by birth)

Gobulo Runqi (Chinese: 郭布羅潤麒; July 8, 1912 – June 6, 2007) was a member by right of birth of the Gobulo clan, part of the prestigious Plain White Banner group of the Qing dynasty and brother of Wanrong, the last empress consort of China.

He served under the Japanese puppet Manchukuo regime in the 1940s until its collapse, and in later life, ran an acupuncture centre from his home in Beijing.

== Biography ==
Runqi came from the Gobulo clan, a family closely linked to the imperial House of Aisin-Gioro.

He was born in Beijing on July 8, 1912, shortly after the fall of the Qing dynasty following the Xinhai Revolution.

In 1922, after the marriage of his sister to Puyi, the last emperor of China, he began spending time in the Forbidden City. Runqi recalled Wanrong crying with her mother on the day she entered the Forbidden City.

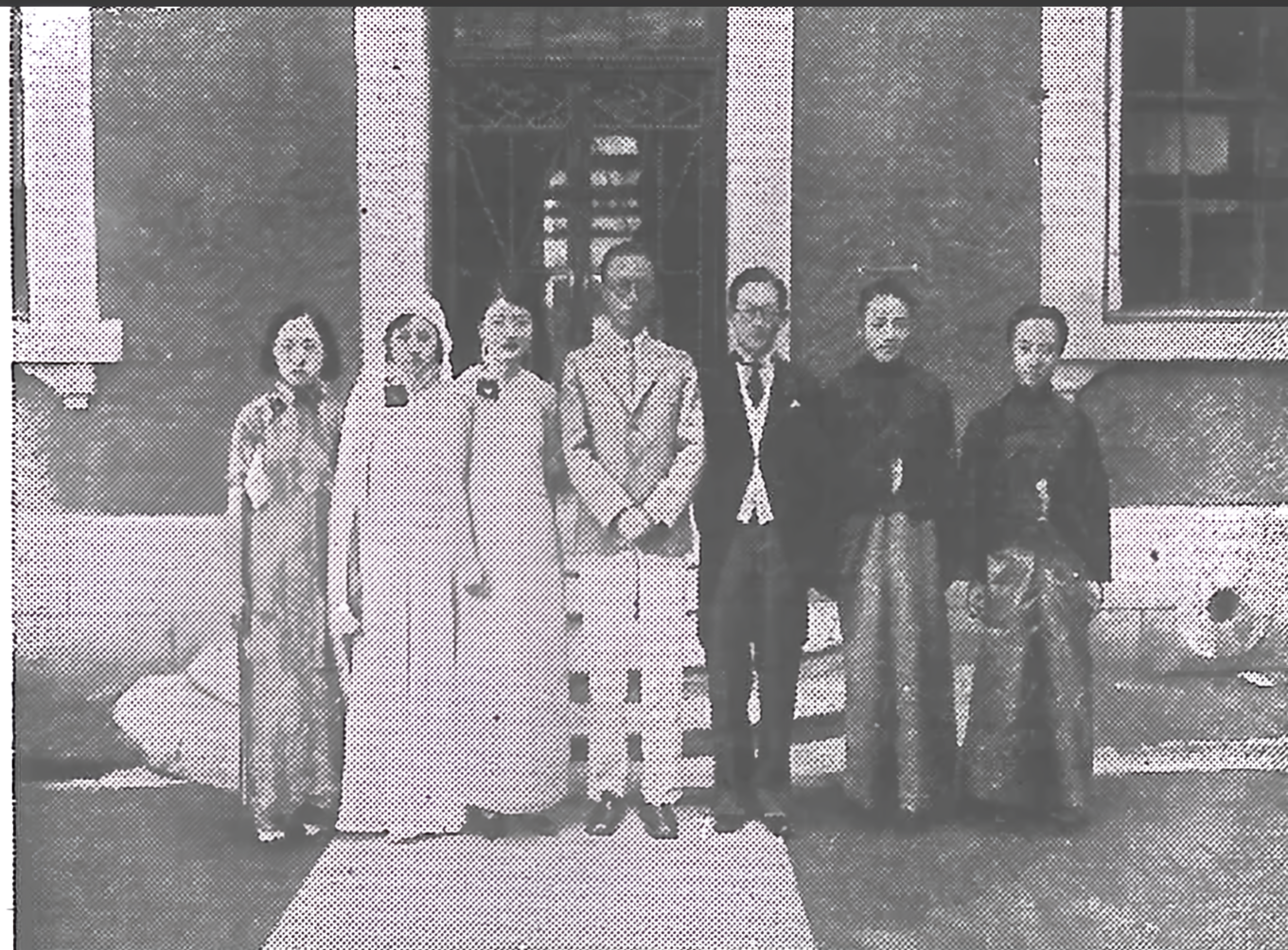
Runqi's wedding in 1932, pictured with Puyi

In 1932, he married Jin Yunying, the third younger sister of Pu Yi and they had three children: Zongyan (宗 弇), Zongguang (宗 光) and Manruo (曼 若). After his marriage, Pu Yi sent him to Japan for military studies, accompanied by his wife. Runqi served in the Japanese puppet state of Manchukuo. During the Soviet invasion of Manchuria in 1945, Runqi was captured by the Soviet army, later being tried before a war criminals court in China. He was released at the age of 45 in 1957, and worked in agriculture before being employed at the Institute of Legal Research in the Chinese Academy of Social Sciences.

In the early 2000s, he ran an acupuncture and traditional Chinese medicine centre from his home.

In 2005, at the age of 93, Runqi, angered and upset at how the media were portraying his late sister, sued, saying "As long as I live, I will not allow irresponsible fabrications and even personal insults about Wanrong's life story!

On October 23, 2006, a ritual burial next to the Western Qing Tombs for his half-sister Wanrong was performed at his request.

He died on June 6, 2007, at the age of 94 in Beijing, China.

== See also ==
- Jin Yunying
- Western Qing Tombs
