= Isabel Ingram =

American art collector and tutor

Isabel Ingram Mayer
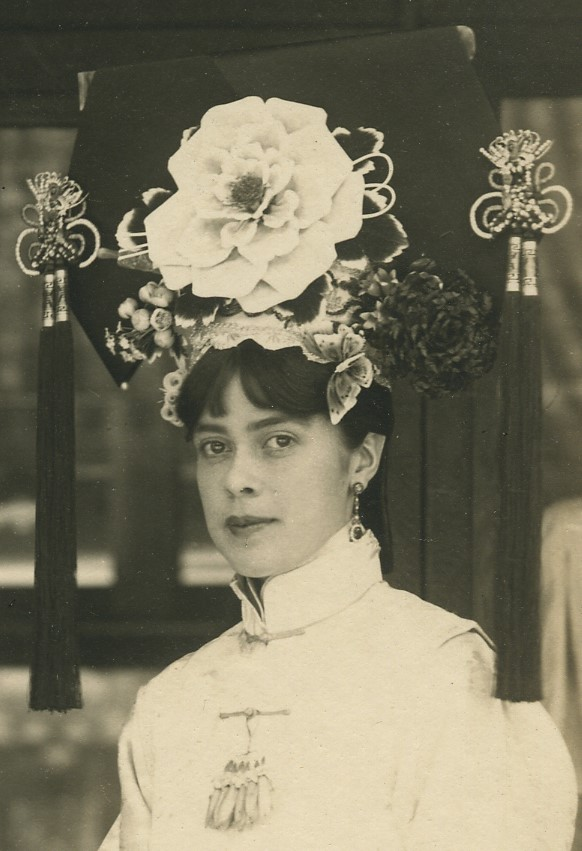
- Ingram at the Forbidden City in 1924.
- Born: Isabel Myrtle Ingram; March 7, 1902; Beijing, Great Qing
- Died: 1988 (aged 85–86); Arlington County, Virginia, U.S.
- Occupations: Author and tutor

Isabel Ingram Mayer (née Ingram; March 7, 1902 – 1988) was an American tutor to Wanrong, the empress consort of China of Puyi, the last emperor of China.

== Early life ==
Born 7 March 1902 in Beijing, Ingram was the daughter of American Congregational missionary James Henry Ingram (1858-1934) and Myrtle Belle (Prough) Ingram (1871-1941), his second wife. Her passport and a New York Times article (cited below) give her sisters as Miriam Ingram and Ruth Ingram. Other siblings were Kathryn Ingram (Rowe), Robert Ingram, and Lewis Ingram.

== Tutor to Wanrong in the Forbidden City ==
Ingram graduated from Wellesley College in Massachusetts in 1922. She returned to China, was admitted to the Forbidden City and became Wanrong's tutor. Wanrong married Puyi in December 1922 and became the last empress of China. Ingram began teaching Wanrong English in 1922, shortly before the marriage and recalled the yellow satin robe Wanrong wore on her wedding day. Ingram noted: "The boy Emperor rarely, if ever, interrupted our study hour."

== Accounts of Isabel Ingram in Richard Halliburton, The New York Times and Time ==
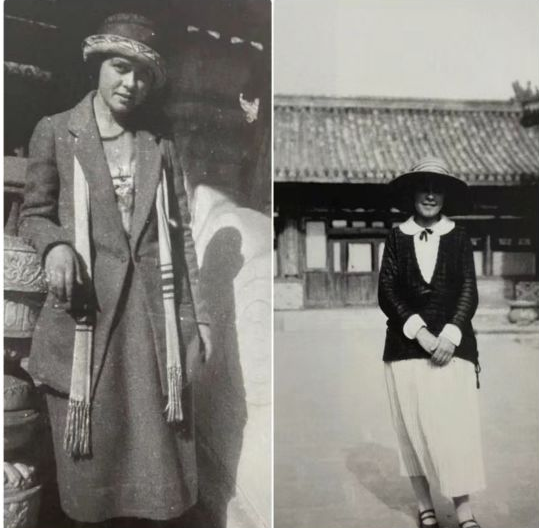
Ingram in the Forbidden City

Famous in his era, travel-adventure writer Richard Halliburton wrote his parents in December 1922 that he called on "the young American tutoress of the Empress of China." He added that he found the visit quite interesting. The young Ingram was petite and quite attractive. He wrote that on Christmas Eve he "went for a walk about the city wall with Miss Ingram" and that "the Royal Pair were only married a day or two before," adding that "this girl" and Reginald Johnston, Pu Yi's tutor, were the only people of European stock "at the great ceremony." In his book The Royal Road to Romance, he wrote that the empress was not to be outdone by the emperor with his tutor and that Ingram taught her the speech, modes, and manners of the West. The two girls tried to look like one another and traded clothes on at least one occasion.

A 21 November 1934 New York Times article stated that the empress received part of her education from two American women. It named the women as Miriam Ingram and Isabel Ingram and stated they are daughters of a Congregational missionary from Philadelphia. The article explained that from them the empress learned English, history, and something about life in the Western world.

On 12 May 1924, Time had a piece titled "Henry The Democrat," Henry referring to a name adopted by Puyi, who, according to Time, had a "beautiful consort" with the court name Elizabeth (Wanrong). The article states "Elizabeth was accompanied by Miss Isabel Ingram, graduate of Wellesley, her American tutor."

== Scholarly writing ==
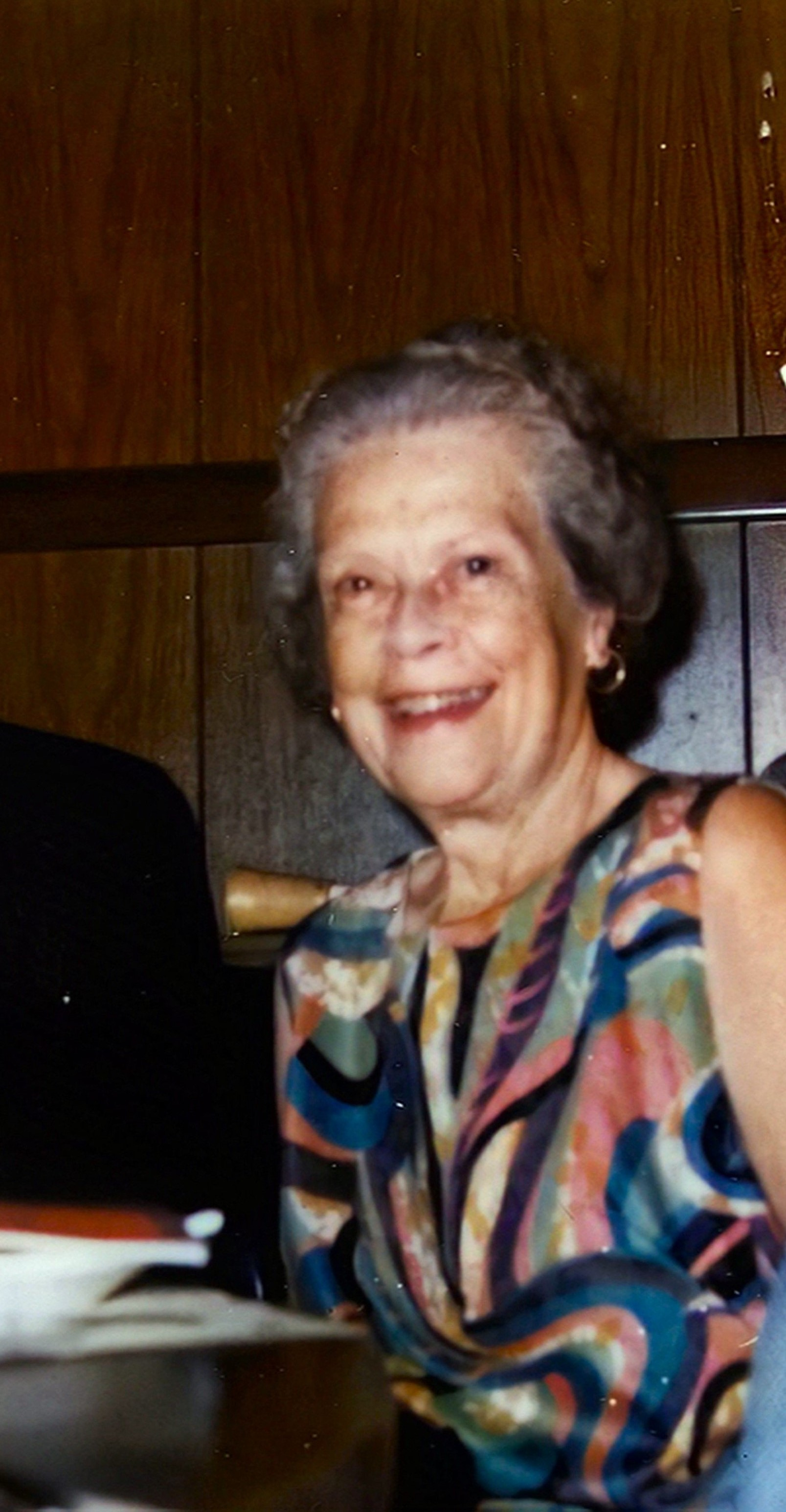
Ingram in the 1970s

As a reflection of her interest in Chinese art and culture, she wrote "A Scroll of the Eight Views by Chang Lung Chang" for The Pennsylvania Museum Bulletin as well as "The Siren Collection of Chinese Sculpture," both from 1927 to 1929.

== Passport data ==
According to Ingram's American passport, in case of death or accident, she wished that a sister Ruth Ingram be notified at Peking Union Medical College.

A note on Ingram's passport reads "Travelling to British ports, Egypt, Palestine, and the United Kingdom en route to the United States of America. British Consulate, Peking. 23/2/27." On 12 April 1927, it was stamped by the harbour police in Ceylon. It bears other stamps, including Italy, Singapore, Greece, and Port Said. In 1928, she returned to China. At the time of her father's death in 1934, she lived in Edgewood, Maryland, with her husband William Mayer, a captain in the United States Army.
