= Collar (order) =

Symbol of membership in chivalric orders

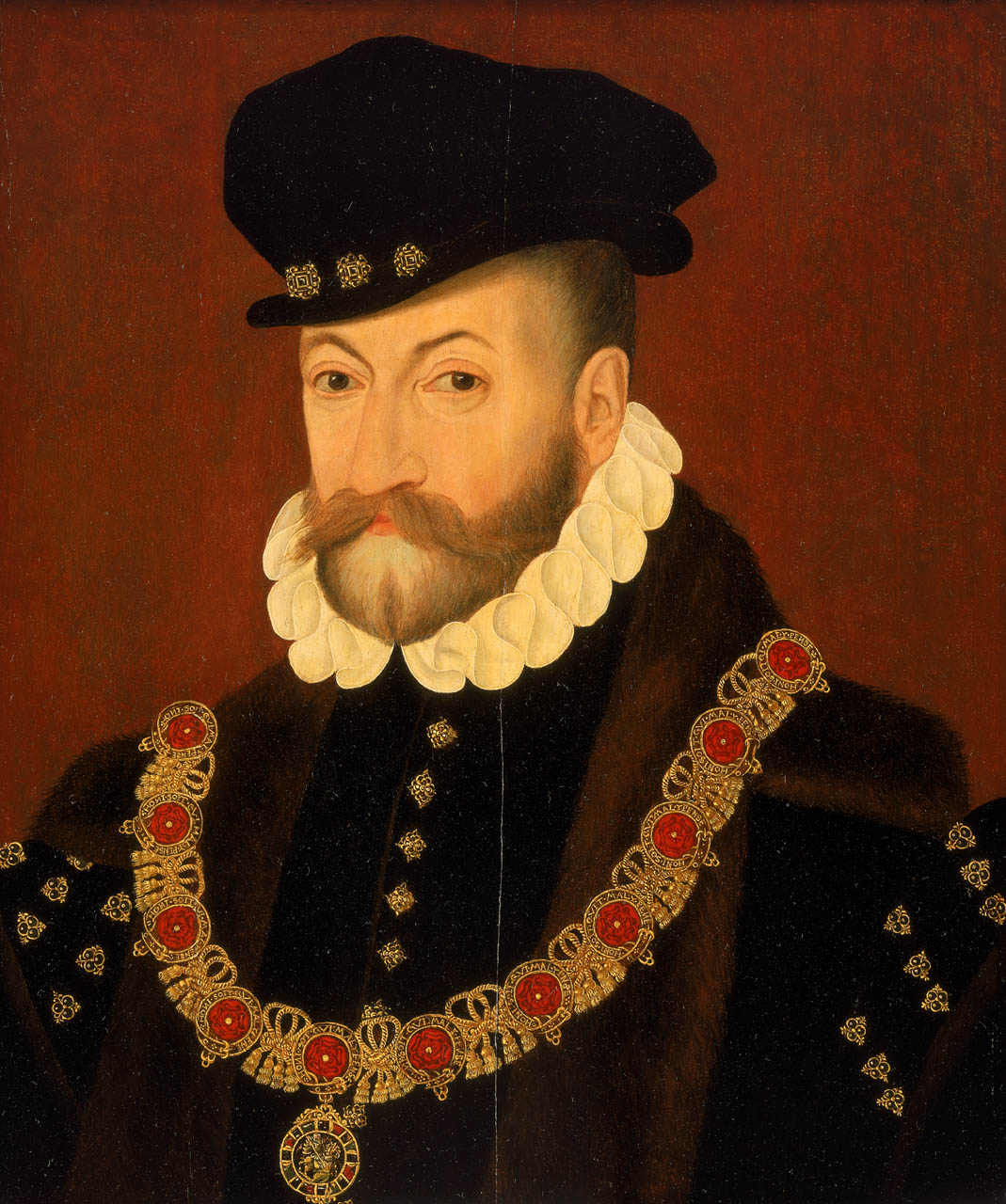
Edward Fiennes de Clinton, 1st Earl of Lincoln, wearing the collar of the Order of the Garter (c. 1575)

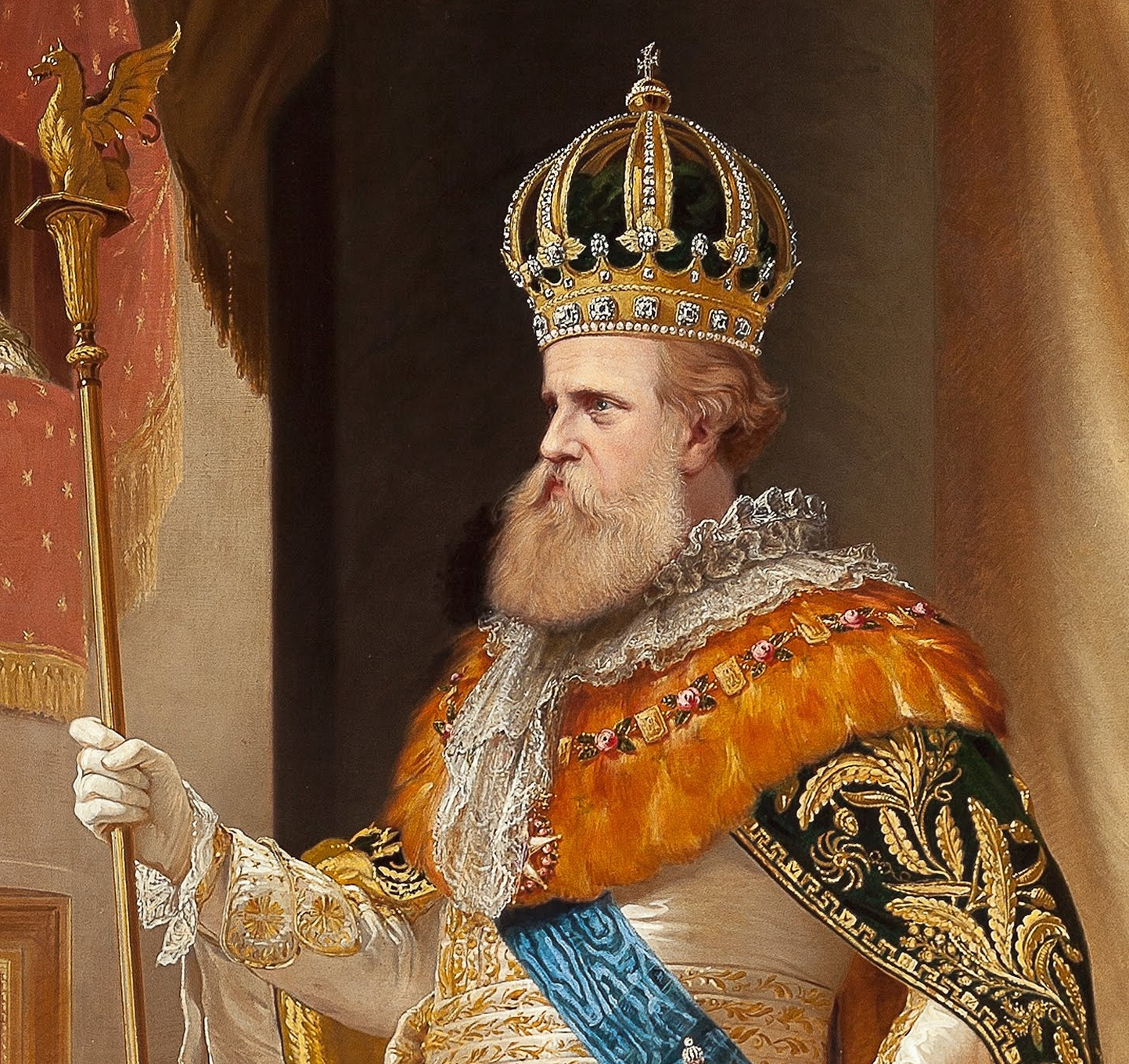
Emperor Pedro II of Brazil wearing the collar of the Order of the Rose and items of the Imperial Regalia. Detail from a painting by Pedro Américo (1872)

A collar, also known as collar of an order, is an ornate chain, often made of gold and enamel, and set with precious stones, which is worn about the neck as a symbol of membership in various chivalric orders. It is a particular form of the livery collar, the grandest form of the widespread phenomenon of livery in the Middle Ages and Early Modern Period. Orders which have several grades often reserve the collar for the highest grade (usually called the Grand Cross). The links of the chain are usually composed of symbols of the order, and the badge (also called "decoration", "cross" or "jewel") of the order normally hangs down in front. Sometimes the badge is referred to by what is depicted on it; for instance, the badge that hangs from the chain of the Order of the Garter is referred to as "the George".

== History ==
=== A medieval tradition: the Order of the Collar (14th century) ===
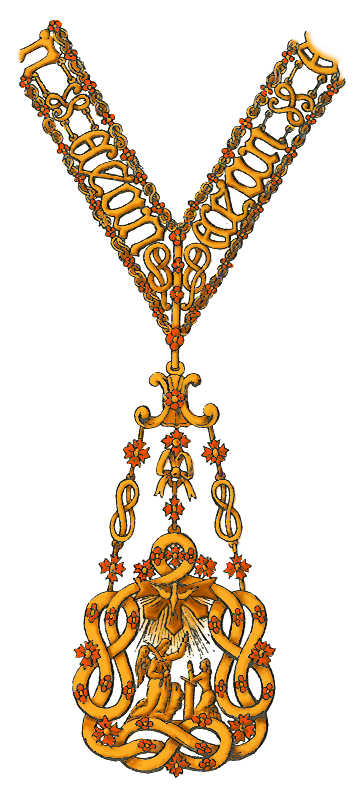
The Collar Badge of the Supreme Order of the Most Holy Annunciation, the oldest grand collar, was worn by Prince Vittorio Emanuele of Savoy.

The first of the Orders of Knighthood were the military orders of crusaders who used red, green or black crosses of velvet on their mantles, to distinguish their brotherhoods. Later the members of knightly orders used rings, embroidered dragons and even garters as the symbol of their order. In the late Middle Ages the knights wore their insignia ever more prominently and medaillons, crosses and jewels in the shape of animals began to be worn on chains around the neck, known as livery collars.

In the fourteenth century, Amadeus VI, Count of Savoy (1343–1383) instituted the Order of the Collar. The order was dedicated to the Blessed Virgin Mary The primary and oldest insignia of the order is its collar. It consists of a solid gold medallion of the collar, which portrays the Annunciation of the Blessed Virgin Mary by the Archangel Gabriel. The medallion is surrounded by three intertwined Savoyan knots, decorated with small crosses fleury, and in the upper center, between two of the Savoyan knots, a cluster of rays with a dove, representing the Holy Spirit, is depicted also in gold.

Animated by a similar Marian devotion, the fashion of these collars spread at the same time as the fashion of wearing rosaries as necklaces spread across Europe reaching England in the fifteenth century.

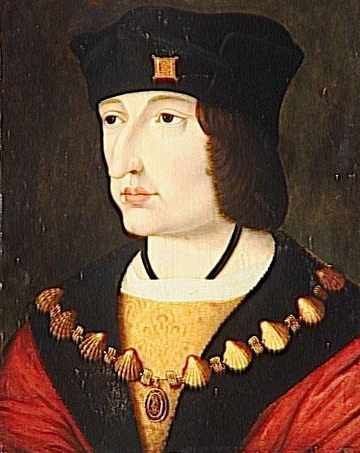
Charles VIII of France, wearing the collar of the Order of Saint Michael

=== The Collar of the Golden Fleece (15th tradition) ===
Collars of various devices are worn by the knights of some of the European orders of knighthood. The custom was begun by Philip III, Duke of Burgundy, who gave his Knights of the Golden Fleece badges depicting a Golden Fleece: it was composed of "gold filigree plaques, simulated black and white enamel firestones, and golden fleece pendant".

=== A French connection: the collar of Saint Michael created in 1469 ===
Following this new fashion, Louis XI of France, when instituting his Order of St. Michael in 1469, gave the knights collars composed of scallop shells linked on a chain, most famously honouring Raoul de Lannoy after the siege of Quesnoy. The chain was doubled by Charles VIII. The first official portrait of a King of France wearing the collar of the order was that of King Louis XII in 1514 and since then, all other Kings have followed that tradition until the order lapsed in 1830; the Order of Liberation claimed to be its continuation in 1945 and it had its own grand collar made by master goldsmith Gilbert Poillerat, which President Charles de Gaulle wore on his official portrait, preferring its Cross of Lorraine to the symbols attached to the Grand Collier of the Legion of Honour.

While the order of Saint Michael was exclusively male, Queen Anne of Austria with the help of her chaplain French Dominican friar François Arnoul established the Order of the Celestial Collar of the Sacred Rosary in 1647, proving once again the connection between the collar and the rosary as an instrument of devotion. The statues of the new order were associated to instructions for fifty devout maidens and all virtuous souls, in order to renew Marian devotion and encourage the holiness of women active in the Catholic Church in France.

=== A tradition spreading to England: Henry VIII and the collar of the Garter (16th century) ===
Henry VIII wearing the Collar of the Garter

Until the reign of Henry VIII, the Order of the Garter, like most ancient of the great knightly orders, had no collar. But the Tudor king wished to match the continental sovereigns in all things as described in the statutes signed on January 5, 1508, by the Register of the Order, and sent to the Holy Roman Emperor Maximilian. The present collar of the Garter knights, with its golden knots and its buckled garters enclosing white roses set on red roses, has its origin in the Tudor age. In 1672, British antiquary Elias Ashmole, described a change from the original collar worn prescribed by King Henry VIII for the collar of the Order of the Garter said to be "a gold collar, coupled together by several pieces of links in fashion of garters, with a vermillion rose, and the image of Saint George hung thereat". Most of the British orders now have collars and they are still worn on special occasions, known as collar days. The Distinguished Service Order, the Order of Merit, the Order of the Companions of Honour and the Imperial Service Order are the exceptions.

=== Heyday of Grand collars in the 18th century ===
After the 17th century the heyday of the collar was over. They were worn only on ceremonial occasions and replaced in daily life by stars pinned to the breast, and badges suspended from ribbons. Many orders retained their collars and when orders were divided into several ranks or grades the collar was usually reserved for the highest rank. The notable exception is Portugal.

At the end of the 18th century, most of the European orders had only one rank, that of knight, and although they usually had collars, the cross or badge was now worn on a ribbon around the neck or over the right shoulder. When the orders became more democratic, several ranks were introduced and only the highest grade, the "Grand Commanders" or "Grand Crosses", wore collars. The Netherlands never had collars, but several Belgian, most of the Austrian and Prussian orders, and several Portuguese orders had collars. In Portugal all the members of these orders of knighthood wear a collar, but the collars of the Grand Cross are more elaborate.

=== The Grand Collier de la Légion d'Honneur ===
Since the beginning of the 19th century, the collar has been used as the insignia of office of the Grand Master of the order. Napoleon I introduced the Grand aigle (Grand Eagle) to replace the Grand Cross as the highest rank in his Legion of Honour. Napoleon dispensed 15 such golden collars of the Legion among his kinsmen and the highest of his ministers. This collar did not survive his downfall and was abolished in 1815. He also introduced the Grand Collier de la Légion d'Honneur which was the first Grand Collar worn outside of a religious order. The president of France wears the collar of the Order of the Legion of Honour. Nowadays, the collar is often a rank above that of a Grand Cross and it is reserved for the president and foreign heads of state as it is in Brazil.

== Heraldry ==
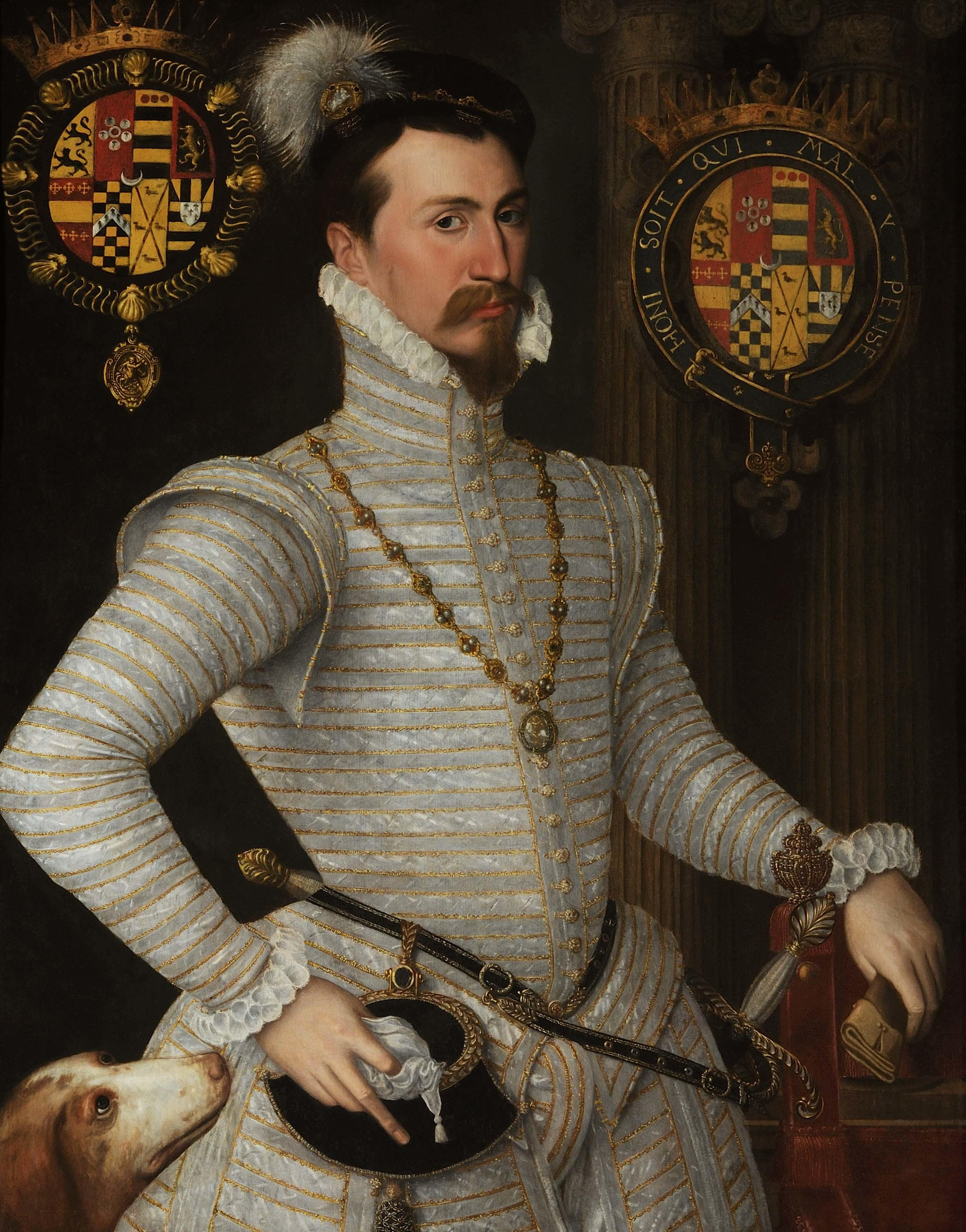
Robert Dudley, Earl of Leicester, his arms at left are surrounded by the Collar of the Order of St Michael.

In heraldry, most members of orders are permitted to display the collar of their order on their coat of arms (if they are in fact entitled to wear the collar). There are often very strict rules as to how exactly the collar is to be displayed. Normally it will entirely encircle the escutcheon (shield), or the collar may be partially hidden by it. Sometimes, only a part of the collar and the badge will extend below the escutcheon.

Collars of different orders are often depicted in the heraldic achievement of various monarchs, encircling the escutcheon. Though the standard achievement used most often may depict specific collars, this does not preclude the use of or substitution with other collars to which someone may be entitled to. Some achievements depict multiple collars while others depict only one; The coat of arms of the Norwegian monarch only depicts the collar of the Order of St. Olav encircling the shield while that of Denmark's depicts the collars of the nation's two chivalric orders: the Order of the Elephant and the Order of Dannebrog. In the greater arms of Sweden, the collar of the Order of Seraphim is used. The collar of the Order of Leopold is also depicted in the national arms of Belgium.

== Death of a recipient ==
When a member of an order dies, they are not usually buried with the collar, but it may be displayed on a pillow placed on the coffin (along with other decorations that the member may have) during the funeral. Many orders require that after the death of a member of the order, the collar and perhaps other insignia be returned to the issuing authority. Often, the requirement is that a male relative personally return the award to the order.

== Orders with collar as a separate (highest) rank ==
Many orders also do have a chain as an ornament that is worn at more official ceremonial occasions (worn by knights of a single class order or members of the highest class of a multi-class order). However, in some orders Collar is a separate rank above that of Grand Cross, i.e.:

=== Europe ===
- Andorra: Collar of the Order of Charlemagne
- Bulgaria:
  - (Tsardom of Bulgaria (1908–1946)) House of Saxe-Coburg and Gotha: Grand and Lesser Chain of the Order of St. Alexander
- Czech Republic: First Class with Collar of the Order of the White Lion (Recipients)
- Cyprus: Grand Collar of the Order of Makarios III
- Estonia: Collar of the Order of the National Coat of Arms
- Estonia: Collar of the Order of the Cross of Terra Mariana (Recipients)
- Estonia: Collar of the Order of the White Star
- Finland: Grand Cross with Collar of the Order of the White Rose
- Georgia:
  - (Kingdom of Georgia) House of Bagrationi: Knight of the Grand Collar of the Order of the Eagle of Georgia
- Germany:
  - (Kingdom of Bavaria) House of Wittelsbach: Knight Grand Cross with Collar of the Order of Saint Hubert
  - (Duchy of Brunswick) House of Hanover: Knight Grand Cross with Collar of the Order of Henry the Lion
- Greece:
  - (Kingdom of Greece) House of Glücksburg: Collar of the Order of Saints George and Constantine
- Holy See: Knight/Dame of the Collar of the Equestrian Order of the Holy Sepulchre of Jerusalem
- Holy See: Knight with the Collar of the Order of Pius IX
- Hungary : Hungarian Corvin Chain
- Hungary : Grand Cross with Chain of the Order of Merit of the Republic of Hungary, Civilian Class (Recipients)
- Iceland: Collar with Grand Cross Breast Star of the Order of the Falcon *
- Italy: Knight Grand Cross with Collar of the Order of Merit of the Italian Republic (Recipients)
  - (Kingdom of the Two Sicilies) House of Bourbon-Two Sicilies / (Duchy of Parma) House of Bourbon-Parma: Bailiff Knight Grand Cross with Collar of the Sacred Military Constantinian Order of Saint George
  - Sovereign Military Order of Malta: Collar of the Order pro Merito Melitensi
- Latvia : Commander Grand Cross with Chain of the Order of Three Stars
- Lithuania: Golden Chain of the Order of Vytautas the Great (Recipients)
- Malta: Honorary Companion of Honour with Collar of the National Order of Merit
- Norway: Grand Cross with Collar of the Royal Norwegian Order of St. Olav
- Portugal: Grand Collar of the Order of the Tower and Sword
- Portugal: Grand Collar of the Military Order of Christ
- Portugal: Grand Collar of the Military Order of Aviz
- Portugal: Grand Collar of the Order of Saint James of the Sword (Recipients)
- Portugal: Grand Collar of the Order of Prince Henry (Recipients)
- Portugal: Grand Collar of the Order of Liberty (Recipients)
- Portugal: Grand Collar of the Order of Camões
  - (Kingdom of Portugal) House of Braganza: Grand Collar of the Order of Saint Michael of the Wing
  - (Kingdom of Portugal) House of Braganza: Grand Collar of the Order of Merit of the Portuguese Royal House
- Romania: Collar of the Order of the Star of Romania
  - (Kingdom of Romania) House of Hohenzollern-Sigmaringen: Grand Cross with Collar of the Order of Carol I
- San Marino: Collar of the Order of San Marino
- Serbia: Collar of the Order of the Republic of Serbia
  - (Kingdom of Yugoslavia) House of Karađorđević: Knight Grand Collar of the Order of St. Prince Lazar
- Spain: Knight/Dame of the Collar of the Order of Charles III
- Spain: Knight/Dame of the Collar of the Order of Civil Merit (Recipients)
- Spain: Knight/Dame of the Collar of the Order of Isabella the Catholic (Recipients)
- Spain: Knight/Dame of the Collar of the Civil Order of Alfonso X, the Wise (Recipients)
- Ukraine:Collar of the Order of Prince Yaroslav the Wise I degree

=== America ===
- Antigua and Barbuda: Knight/Dame Grand Collar of the Order of the Nation
- Argentina: Collar of the Order of the Liberator General San Martín (Recipients)

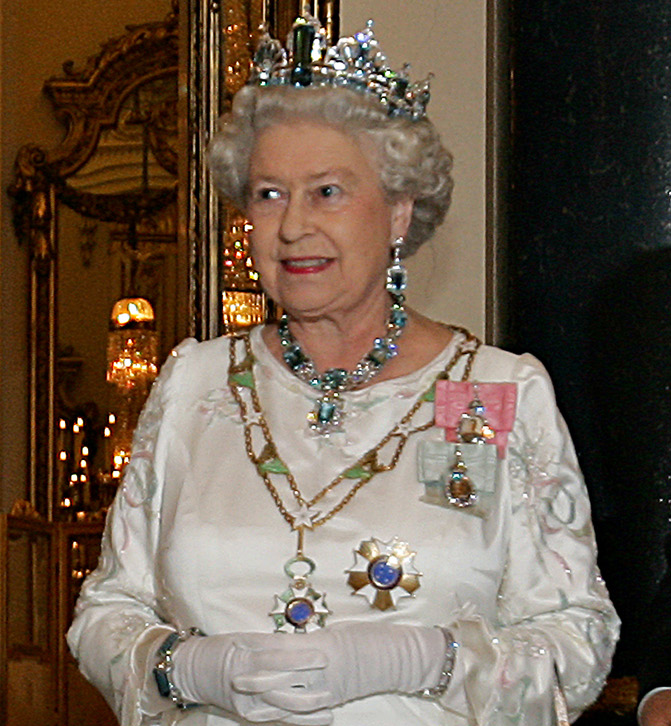
Queen Elizabeth II wearing the "Grand Collar" of the Order of the Southern Cross, a Brazilian order of chivalry founded in 1822.

- Bolivia: Grand Collar of the Order of the Condor of the Andes
- Brazil: Grand Collar of the National Order of the Southern Cross
- Brazil: Grand Collar of the National Congress Order
  - Minas Gerais: Grand Collar of the Medal of Inconfidência
- Chile: Collar of the Order of the Merit of Chile
- Chile: Collar of the Order of Bernardo O'Higgins
- Colombia: Grand Collar of the Order of Boyacá
- Colombia: Grand Collar of the Order of San Carlos
- Dominican Republic: Collar of the Order of Merit of Duarte, Sánchez and Mella
- Dominican Republic: Collar of the Order of Christopher Columbus
- Ecuador: Grand Collar of the National Order of San Lorenzo
- Ecuador: Grand Collar of the National Order of Merit
- Grenada: Knight/Dame Grand Collar of the Order of Grenada
- Guatemala: Collar of the Order of the Quetzal
- Guatemala: Collar of the Order of Antonio José de Irisarri
- Honduras: Grand Collar of the José Cecilio del Valle Order
- Mexico: Collar of the Order of the Aztec Eagle
- Nicaragua: Collar of the Order of Ruben Dario
- Panama: Collar of the Order of Manuel Amador Guerrero
- Paraguay: Collar of the National Order of Merit
- Peru: Grand Collar of the Order of the Sun of Peru
- Venezuela: Collar of the Order of the Liberator

=== Africa ===
- Egypt: Collar of the Order of the Nile
- Egypt: Collar of the Order of the Republic
- Ethiopia:
  - (Ethiopian Empire) House of Solomon: Collar of the Order of the Seal of Solomon
  - (Ethiopian Empire) House of Solomon: Collar of the Order of the Queen of Sheba
  - (Ethiopian Empire) House of Solomon: Grand Cross with Collar of the Order of the Holy Trinity
- Ivory Coast: Collar of the National Order of the Ivory Coast
- Libya:
  - (Kingdom of Libya) House of Senussi: Grand Collar of the Order of Idris I
- Rwanda:
  - (Kingdom of Rwanda) House of Ndahindurwa: Knight Grand Collar of the Royal Order of the Drum
- Sudan: Collar of Honour

=== Asia ===
==== Middle East ====
- Bahrain: Collar of the Order of Khalifa
- Jordan: Collar of the Order of al-Hussein bin Ali
- Kuwait: Collar of the Order of Mubarak the Great
- Oman: Collar of the Order of Al Said
- Palestine: Grand Collar of the State of Palestine
- Saudi Arabia : Badr Chain
- Saudi Arabia : Collar of the Order of Abdulaziz al Saud
- United Arab Emirates : Collar of the Order of Zayed

==== Central Asia ====
- Kazakhstan: Collar of the Order of the Golden Eagle
- Turkmenistan: Collar of the Watan Order
- Turkmenistan: Collar of the Order of Saparmyrat Türkmenbaşy the Great

==== South East & North Asia ====
- China: Friendship Medal
- China: Medal of the Republic
  - Manchukuo: Collar of the Grand Order of the Orchid Blossom
- East Timor: Grand Collar of the Order of Timor-Leste
- Japan: Collar of the Order of the Chrysanthemum
- Laos:
  - (Kingdom of Laos) Lao royal family: Grand Cross with Collar of the Order of the Million Elephants and the White Parasol
- Malaysia: Grand Commander with Collar of the Order of the Defender of the Realm
- Malaysia: Grand Commander with Collar of the Order of Loyalty to the Crown of Malaysia
  - Kedah: Knight Grand Companion of the Most Esteemed Order of Loyalty to Sultan Sallehuddin of Kedah
  - Johor: Collar of The Most Esteemed Royal Family Order of Johor, 1st Class
  - Sabah: Collar of the Grand Commander of the Order of Kinabalu
  - Sarawak: Collar of the Grand Principal of the Most Exalted Order of the Star of Sarawak
  - Sarawak: Collar of the Grand Principal of the Order of the Star of Hornbill Sarawak
- Mongolia: Collar of the Order of Genghis Khan
- Philippines: Grand Collar (Maringal na Kuwintas) of the Order of the Golden Heart (Recipients)
- Philippines: Grand Collar (Supremo) of the Order of Lakandula (Recipients)
- Philippines: Grand Collar (Raja) of the Order of Sikatuna
- South Korea: Collar of the Grand Order of Mugunghwa
- Thailand: Knight/Dame Grand Cordon with Collar of the Order of Chula Chom Klao

=== Oceania ===
- Tonga: Knight Grand Cross with Collar of the Royal Order of Pouono
- Tonga: Knight Grand Cross with Collar of the Order of the Crown of Tonga
- Tonga: Knight Grand Cross with Collar of the Order of Queen Sālote Tupou III

* indicates that the insignia must be returned upon the death of the recipient
† indicates that the order is now dormant but has not been formally abolished

== Gallery ==
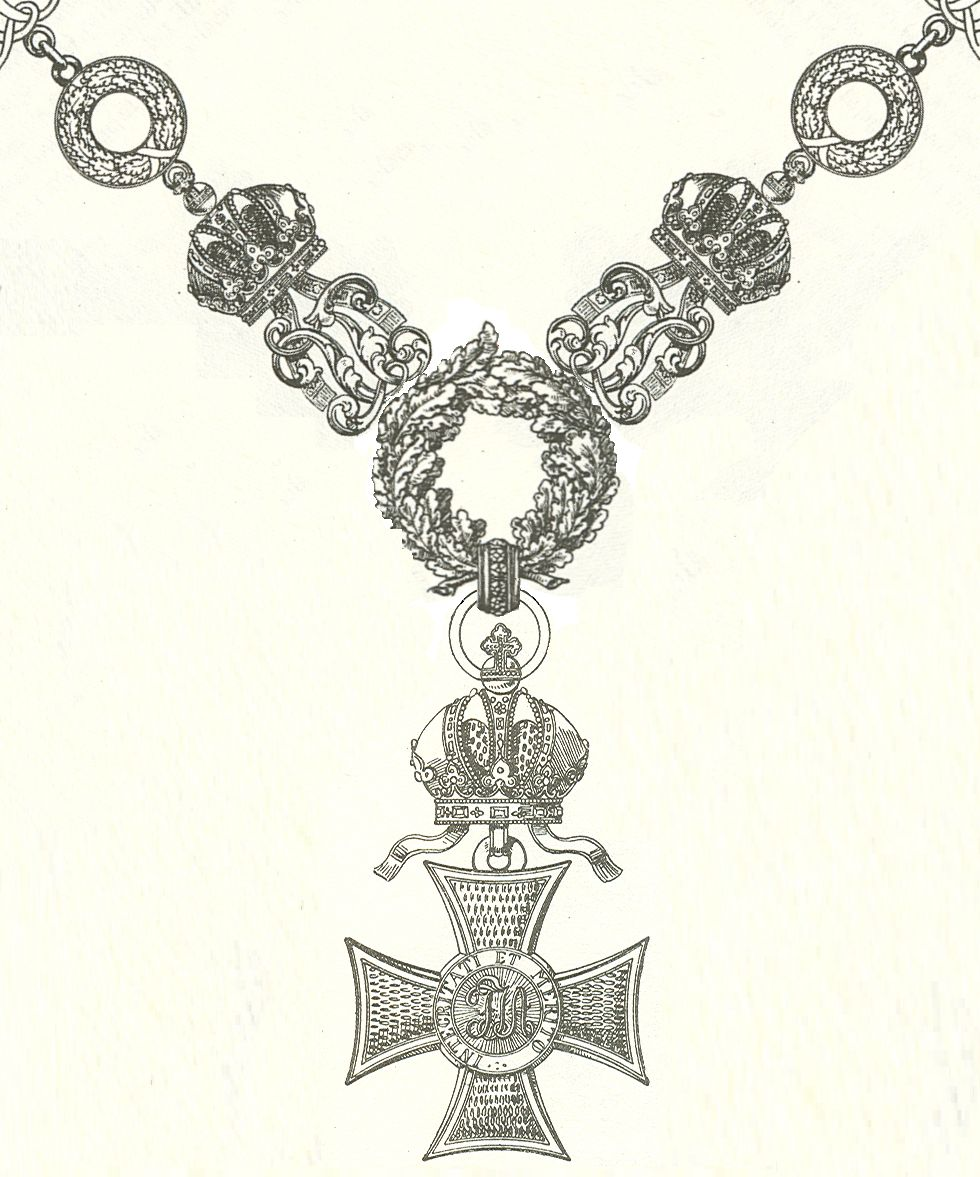
Collar of the Order of Leopold
(Austria)

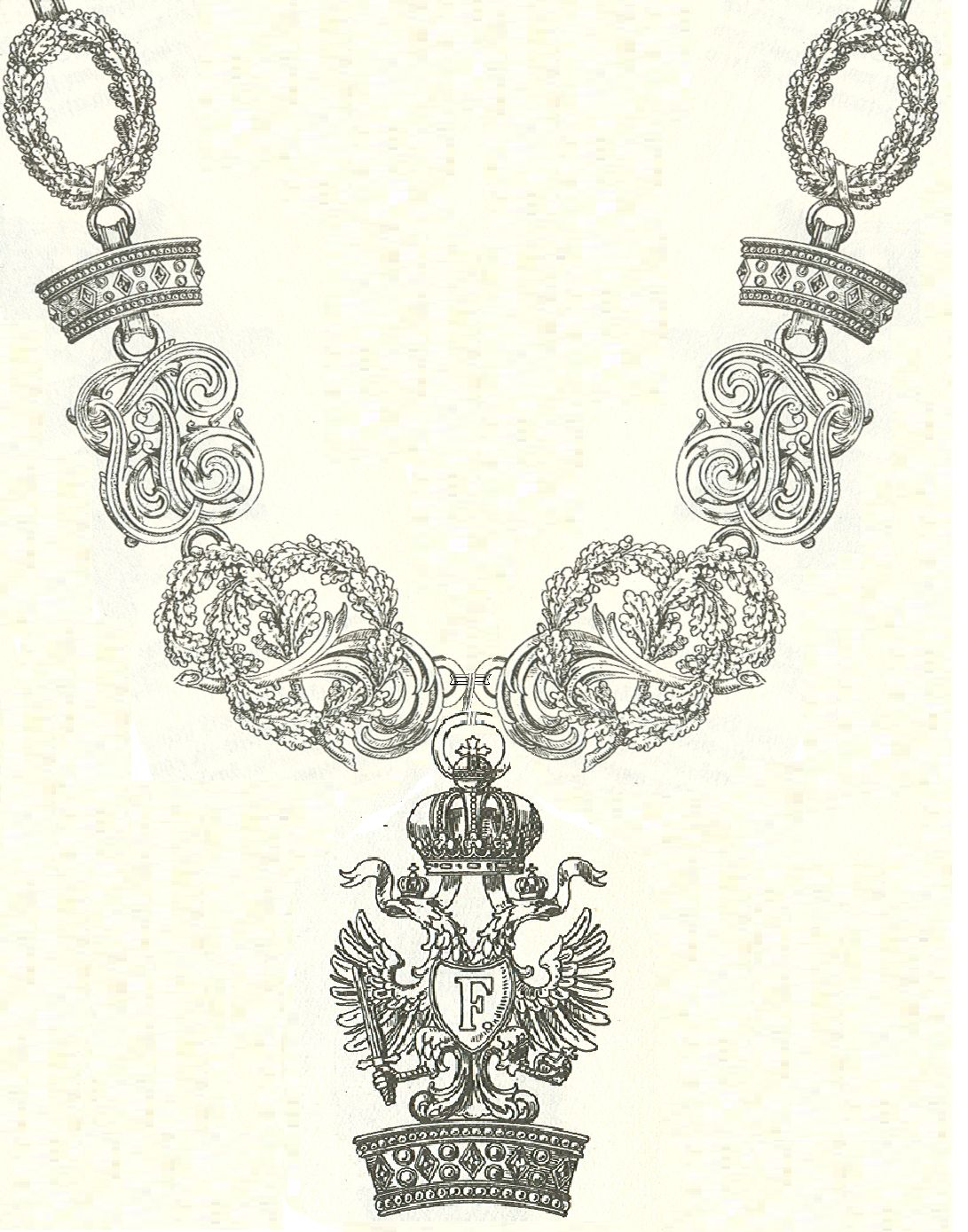
Collar of the Order of the Iron Crown
(Austrian Empire)

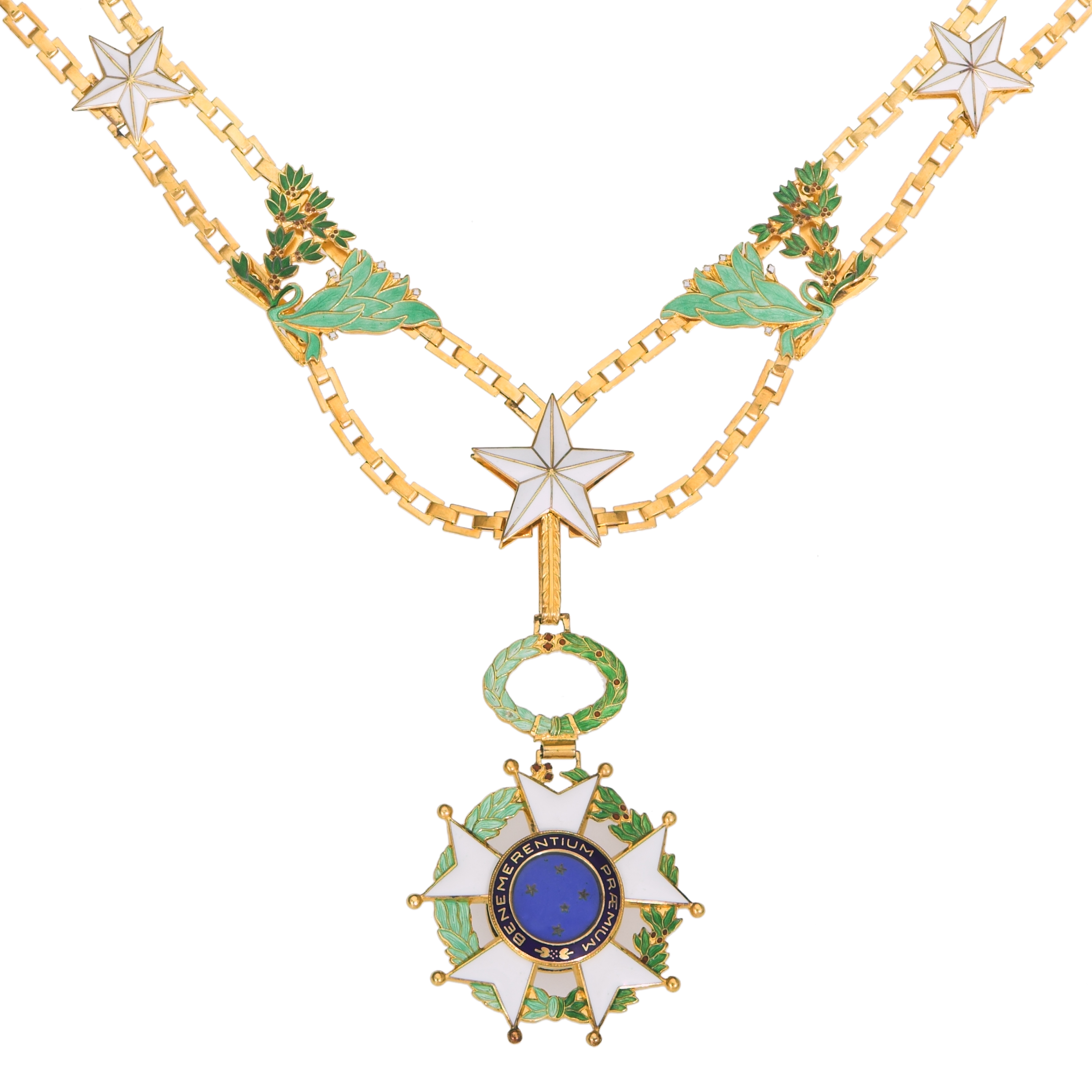
Grand Collar of the National Order of the Southern Cross (Brazil)

Star and Collar of a Knight Grand Commander of the Order of the Star of India
(British Raj)

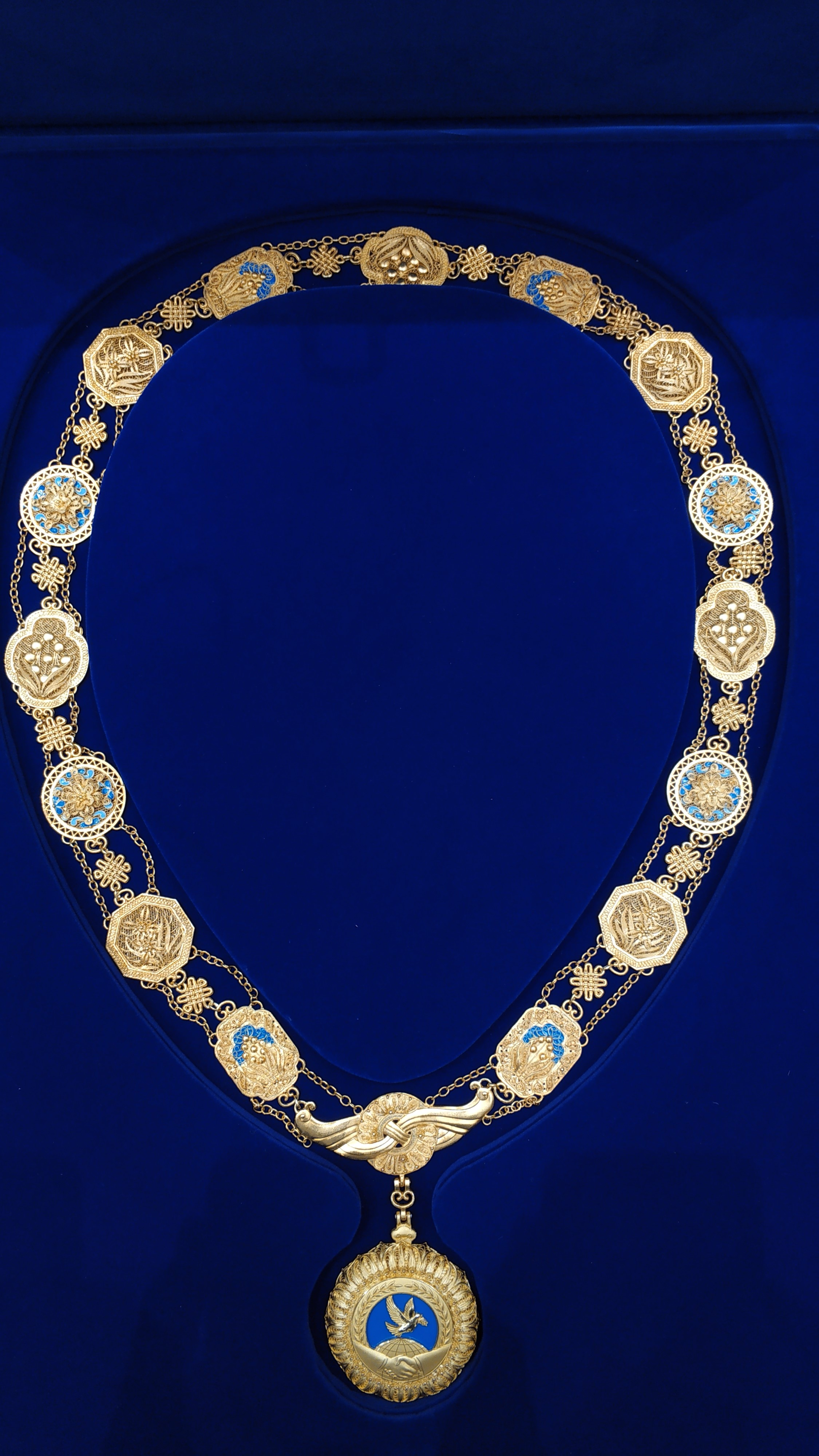
Collar of the Friendship Medal
(China)

Coat of arms of Frederick IV of Denmark and Norway surrounded by the collars of the Order of the Dannebrog and the Order of the Elephant

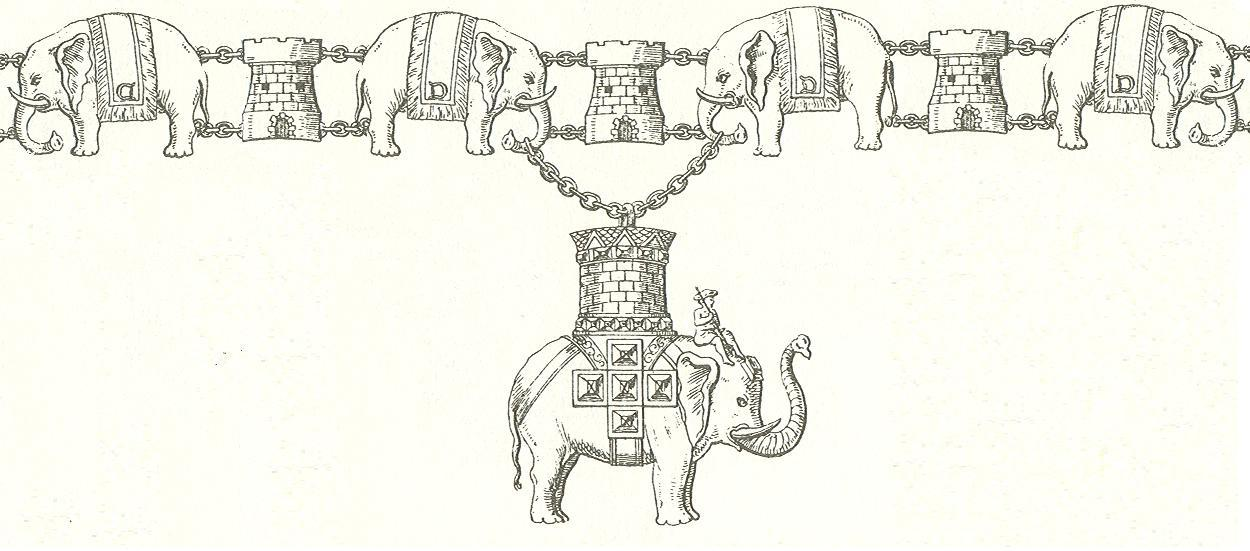
Collar of the Order of the Elephant
(Denmark)

Collar of the Order of Saint Michael
(France)

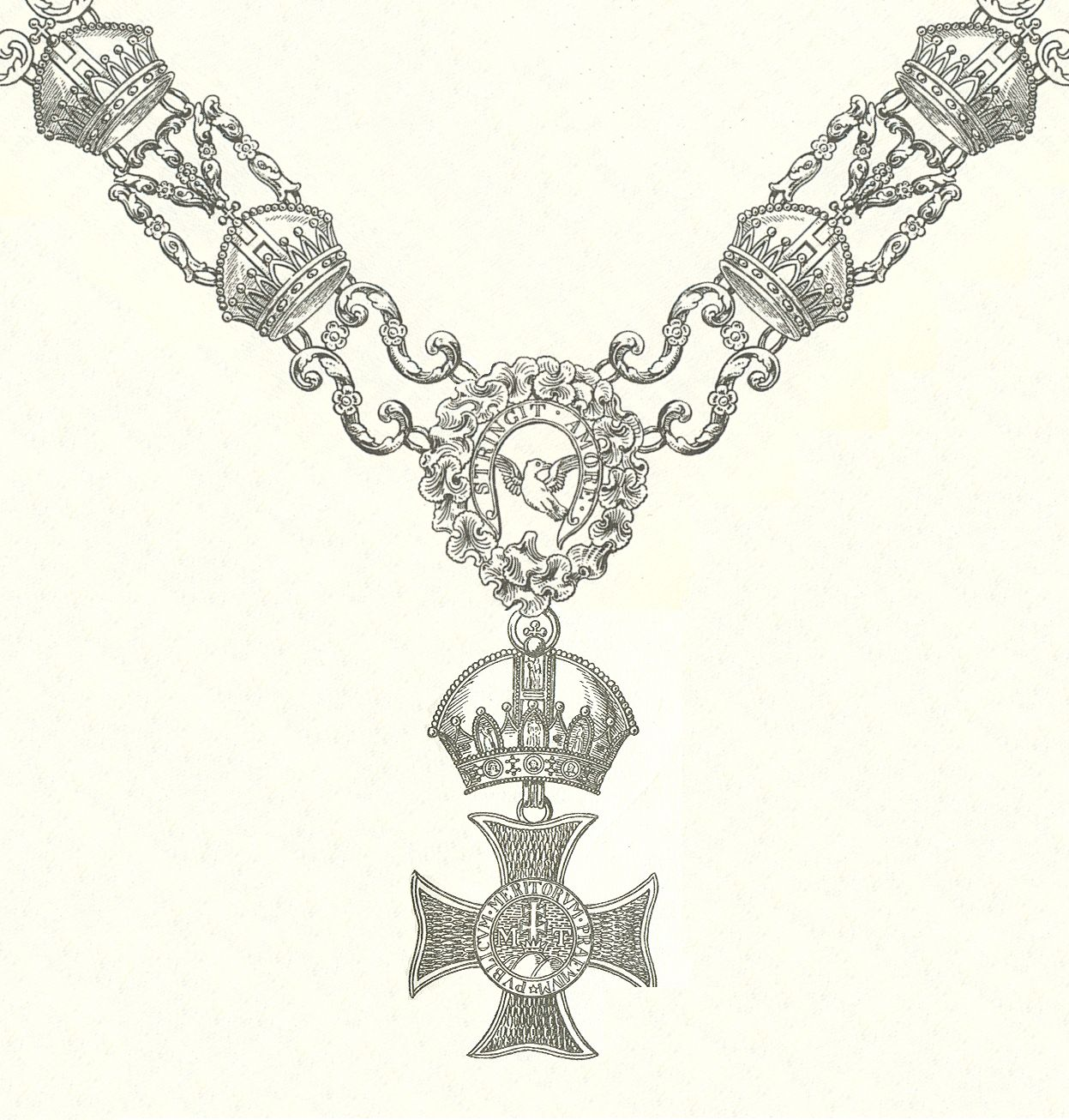
Collar of the Order of St. Stephen
(Hungary)

Collar of the Order of St. Patrick
(Ireland)

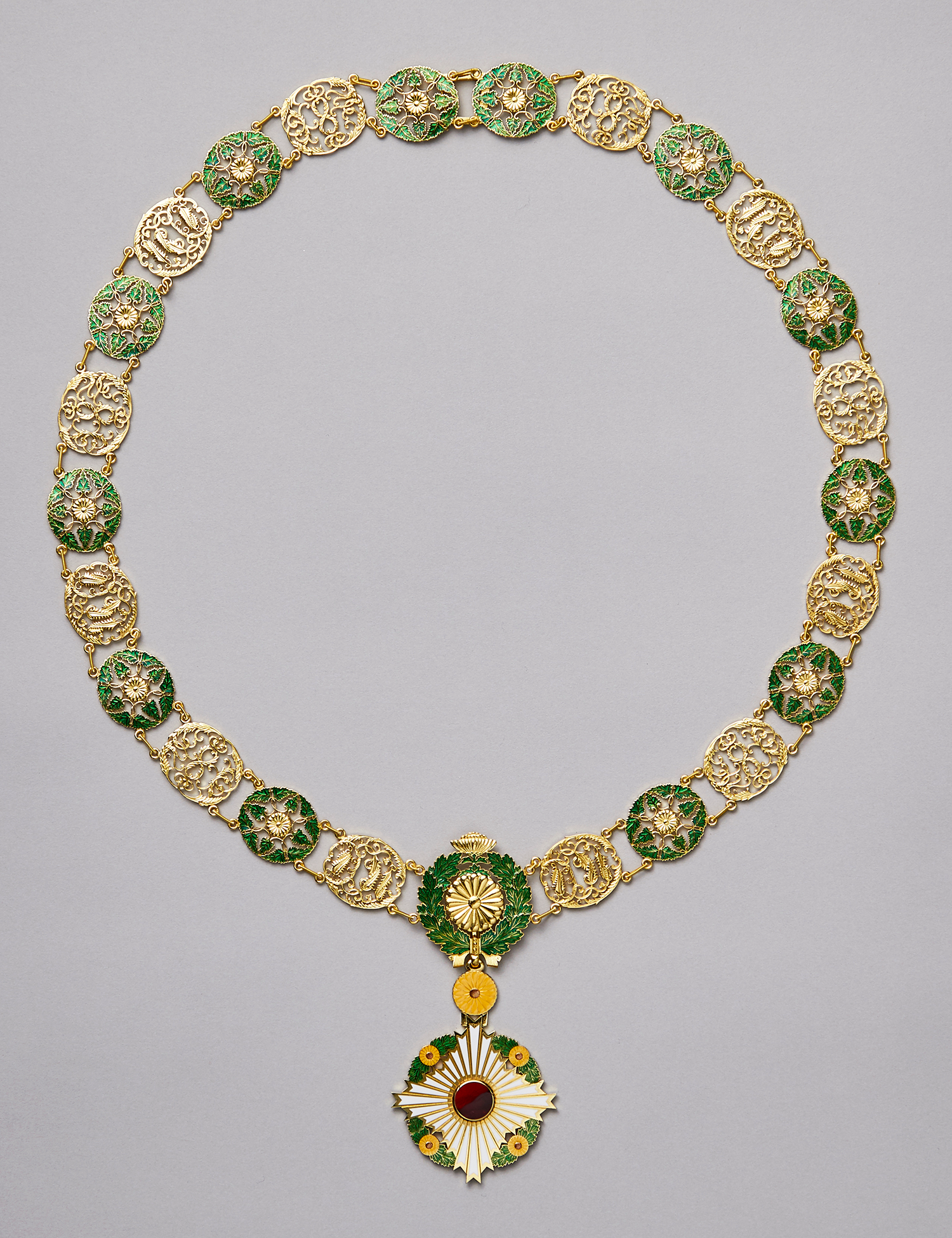
Collar of the Supreme Order of the Chrysanthemum
(Japan)

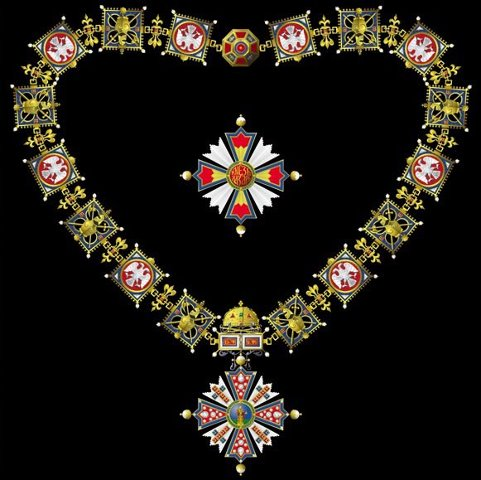
Collar of the Order of St. Prince Lazar
(Kingdom of Serbia, Kingdom of Yugoslavia and Royal House of Serbia)

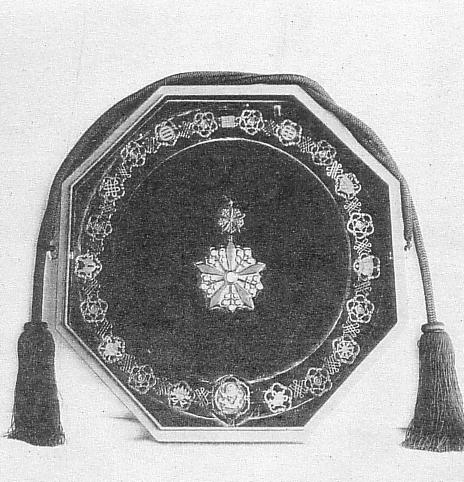
Collar of the Grand Order of the Orchid Blossom
(Manchukuo)

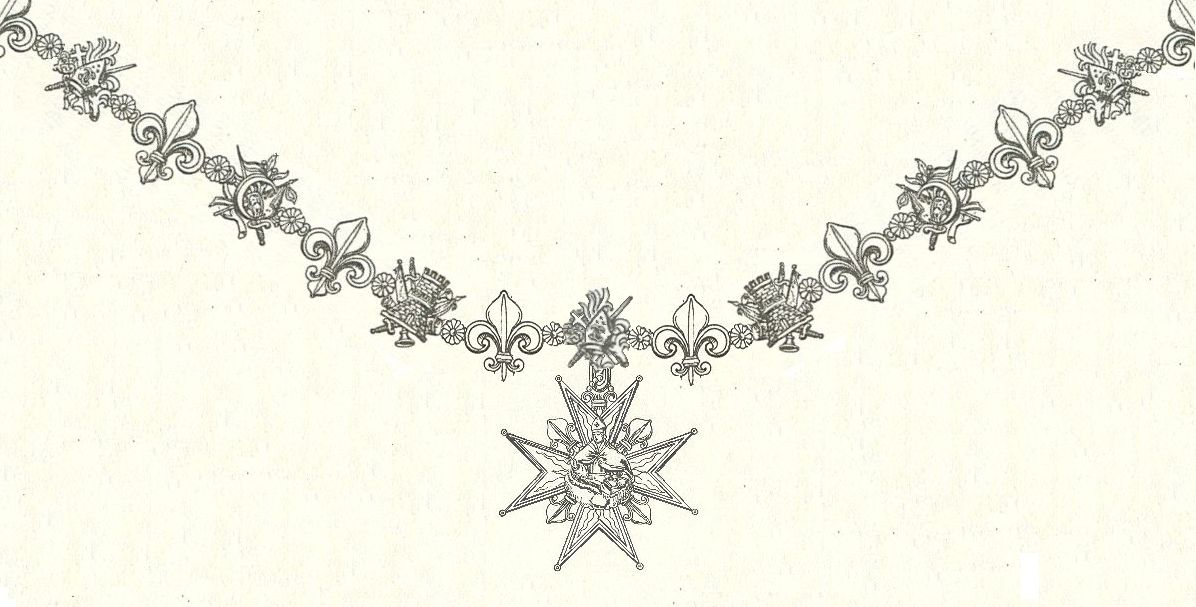
Collar of the Order of St. Januarius—line drawing
(Naples)

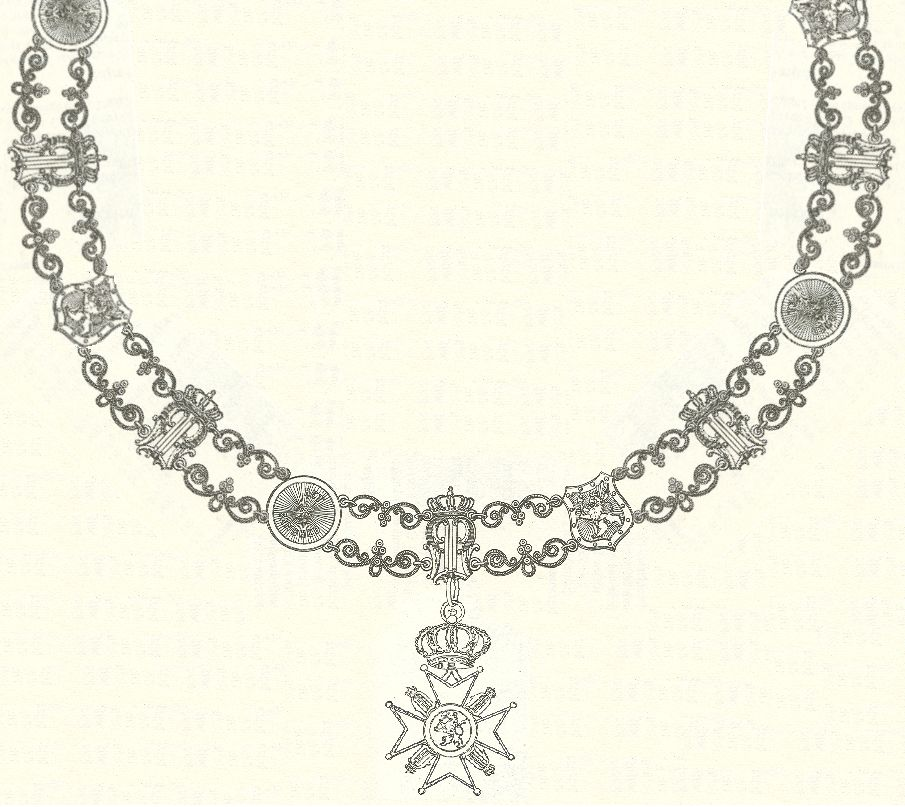
Keten van de Noorse Order of St. Olaf
(Norway)

Collar of the Order of the Thistle
(Scotland)

Collar of the Order of Carlos III
(Spain)

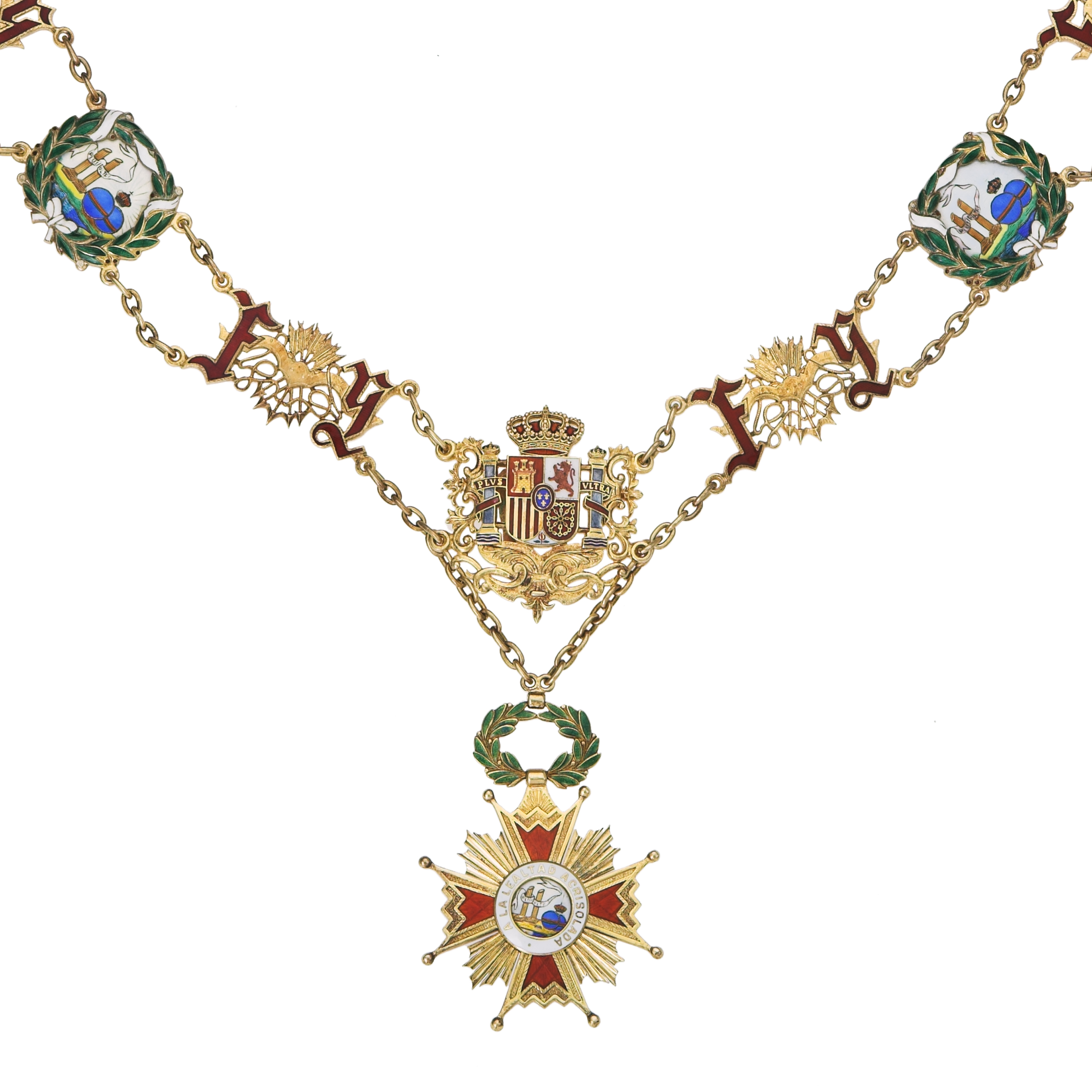
Collar of the Order of Isabella the Catholic
(Spain)

Collar of the Order of Civil Merit
(Spain)

Collar of the Order of the Golden Fleece
(Spain and Austrian Empire)

Collar of the Order of the Seraphim
(Sweden)

Collar of the Order of the Sword
(Sweden)

Collar of the Order of the Polar Star
(Sweden)

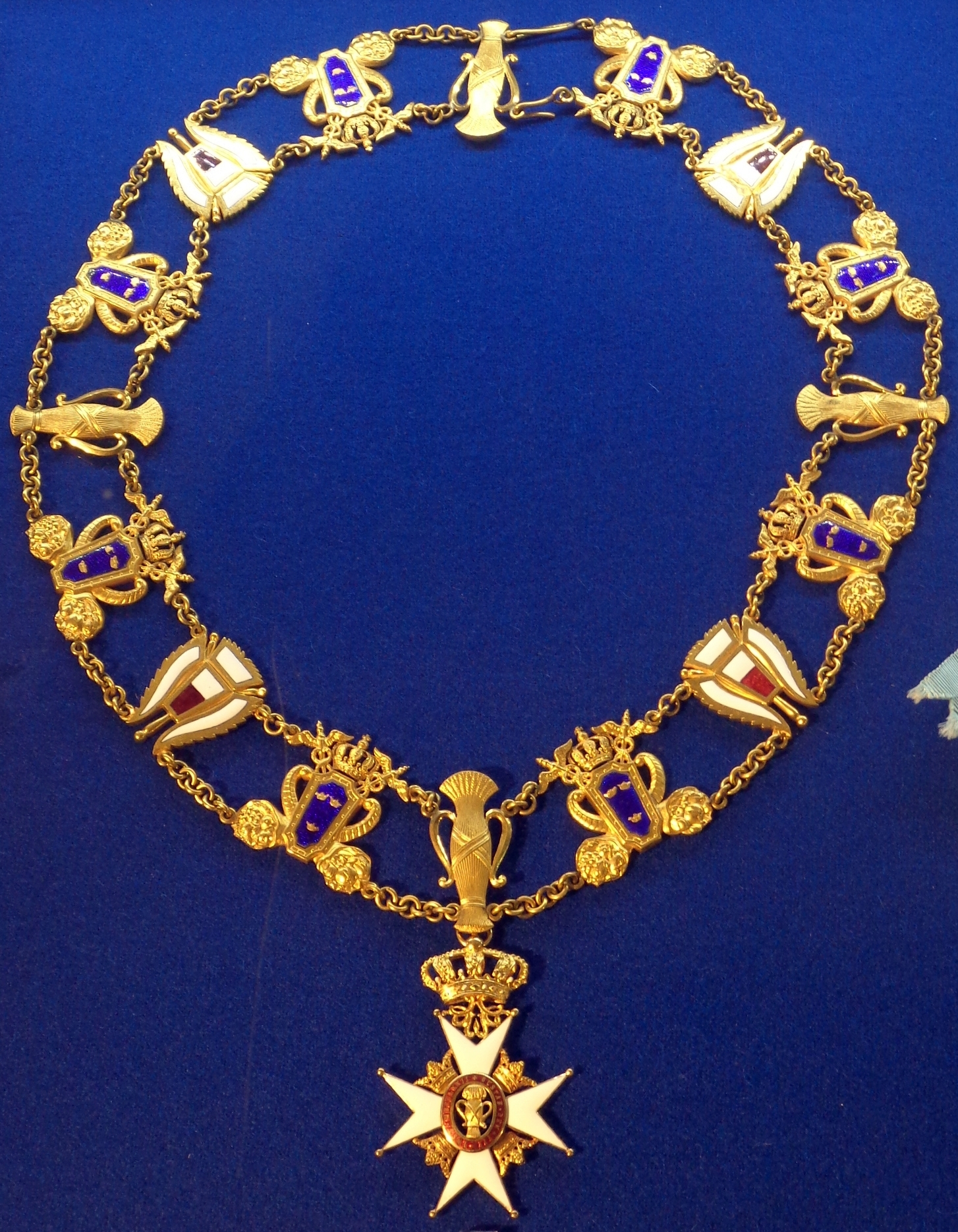
Collar of the Order of Vasa
(Sweden)

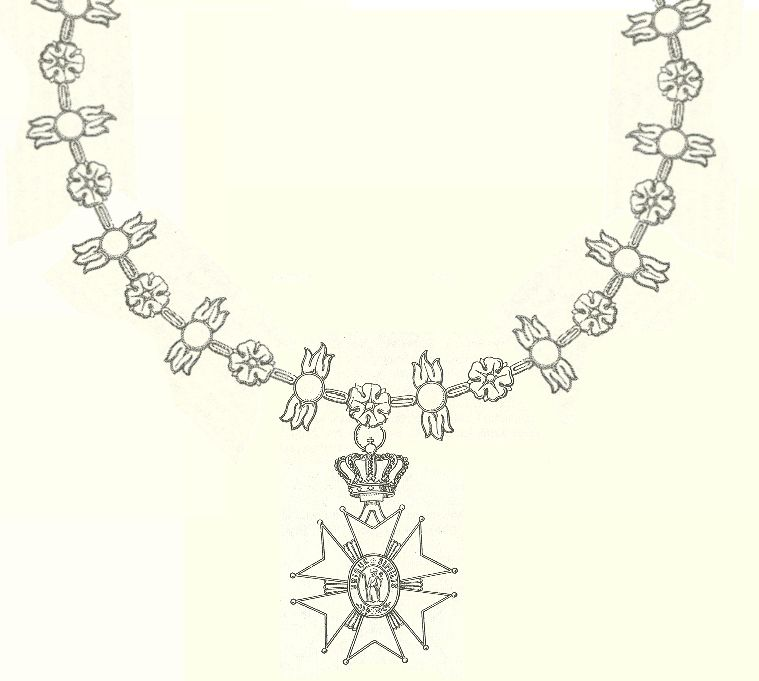
Collar of the Order of Saint Joseph
(Tuscany and Würzburg)

Collar of the Order of the Garter (United Kingdom)

Collar of the Order of St. Michael and St. George (United Kingdom)

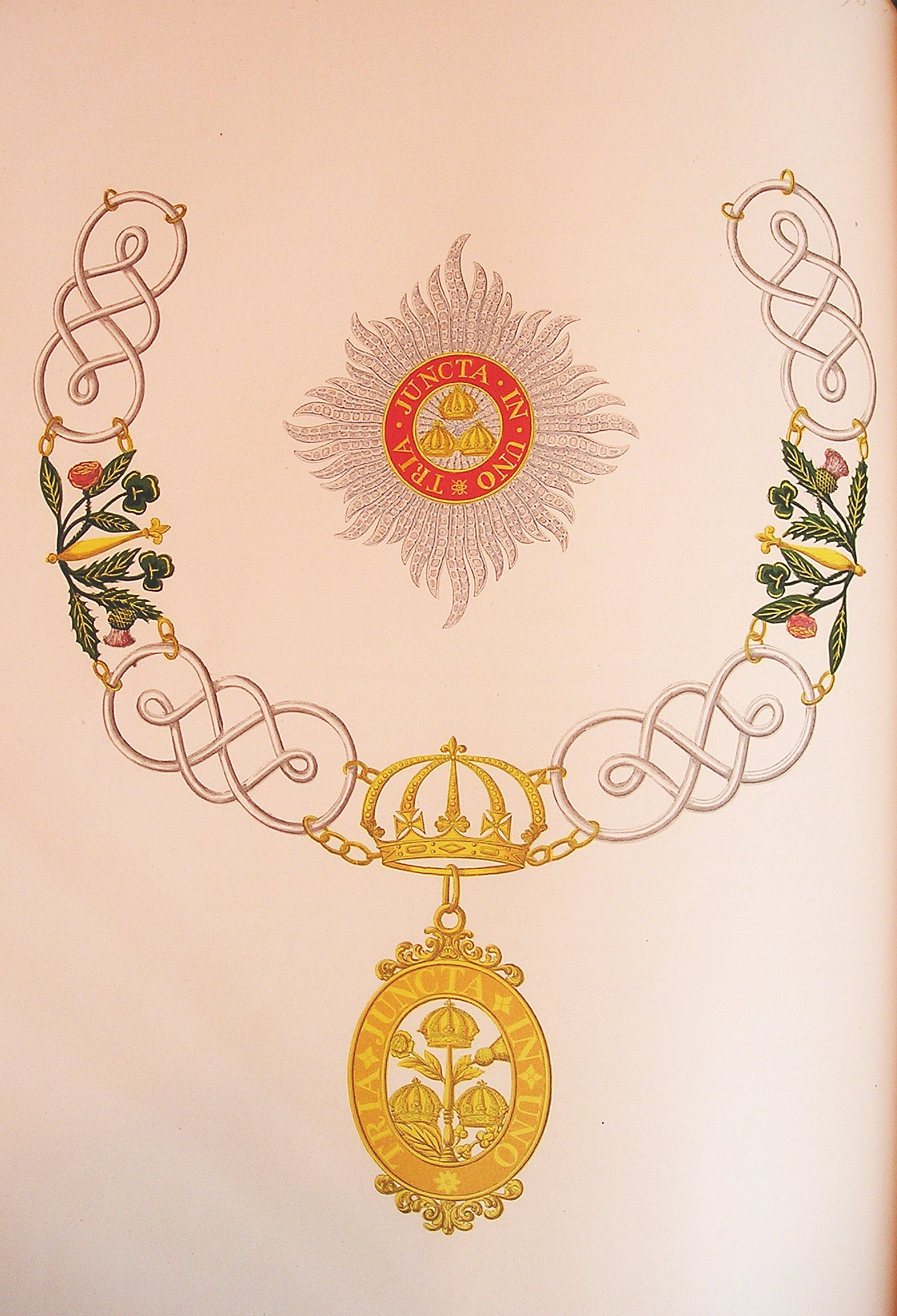
Star and Collar of a Knight Grand Cross of the civil division of the Order of the Bath
(United Kingdom and Commonwealth)

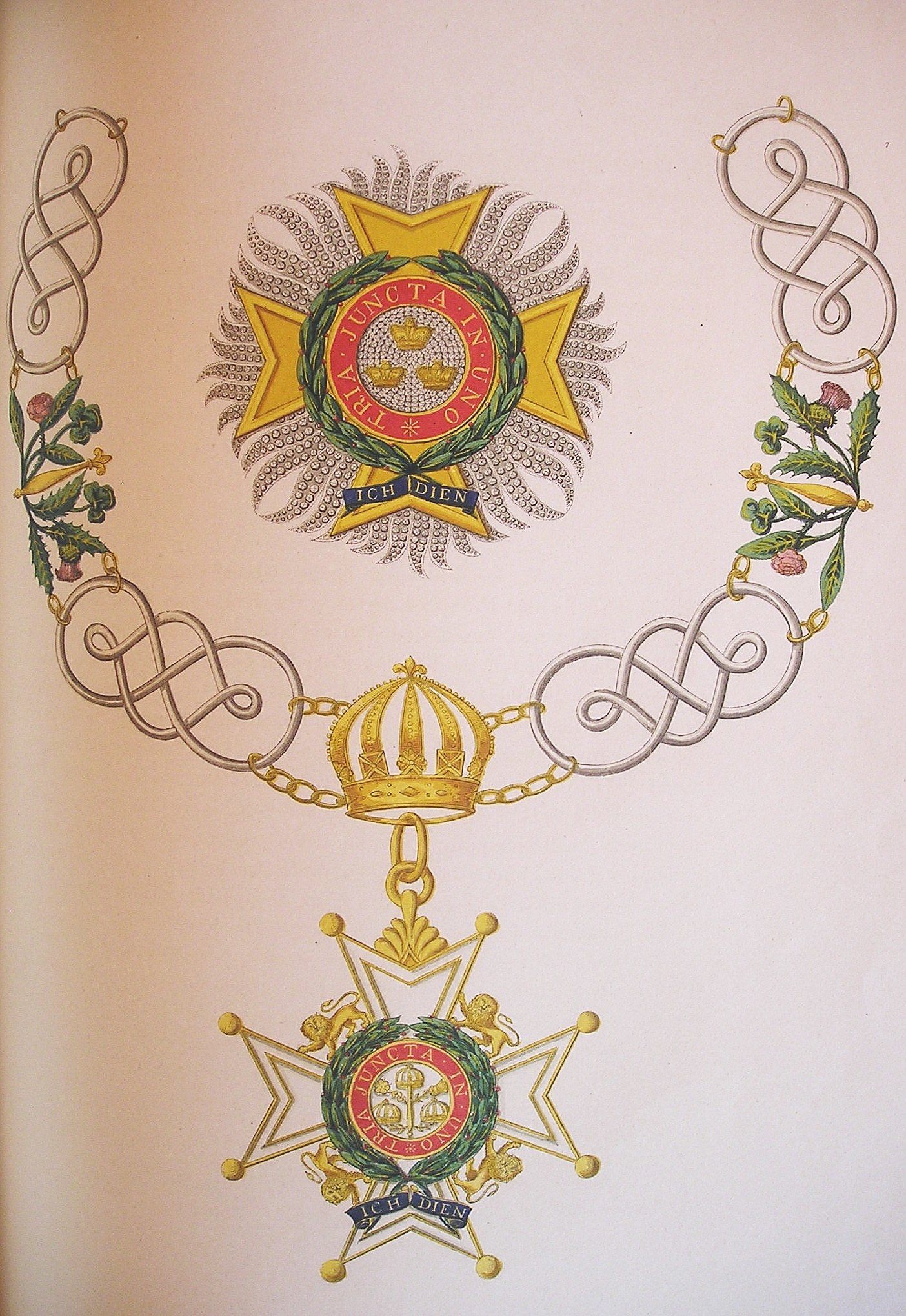
Star and Collar of a Knight Grand Cross of the military division of the Order of the Bath

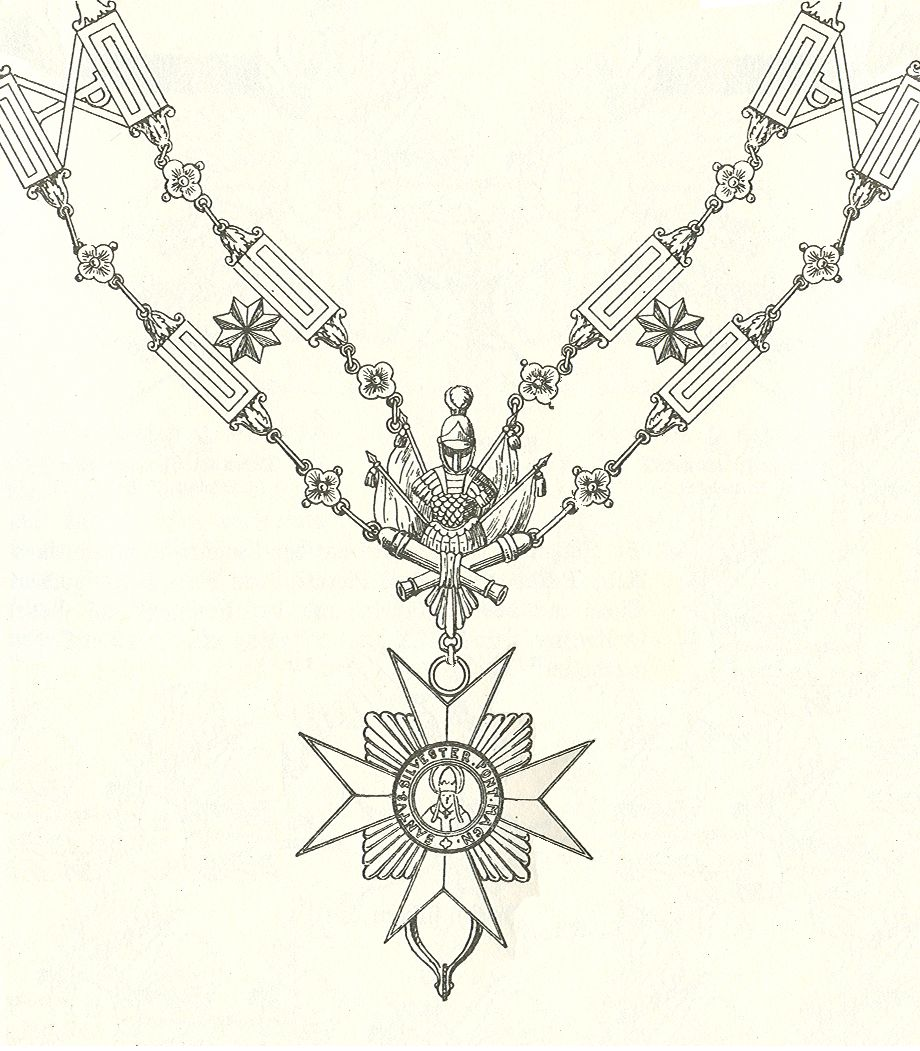
Collar of the Order of Saint Sylvester and the Golden Militia
(Vatican)
Line drawings from Maximilian Gritzner, 1893.

Collar of the Supreme Order of Christ
(Vatican)

== See also ==
- British honours system
- Collar (jewelry)
- Collar day
- Livery collar
