= Order of the Motherland =

Order of the Motherland may refer to:

- Belarus: see Orders, decorations, and medals of Belarus
- Turkmenistan: Watan Order
- Russia: the Order of Merit for the Motherland sometimes informally referred to as the "Order of the Motherland"
