= Order of the Illustrious Dragon =

Military order of Manchukuo

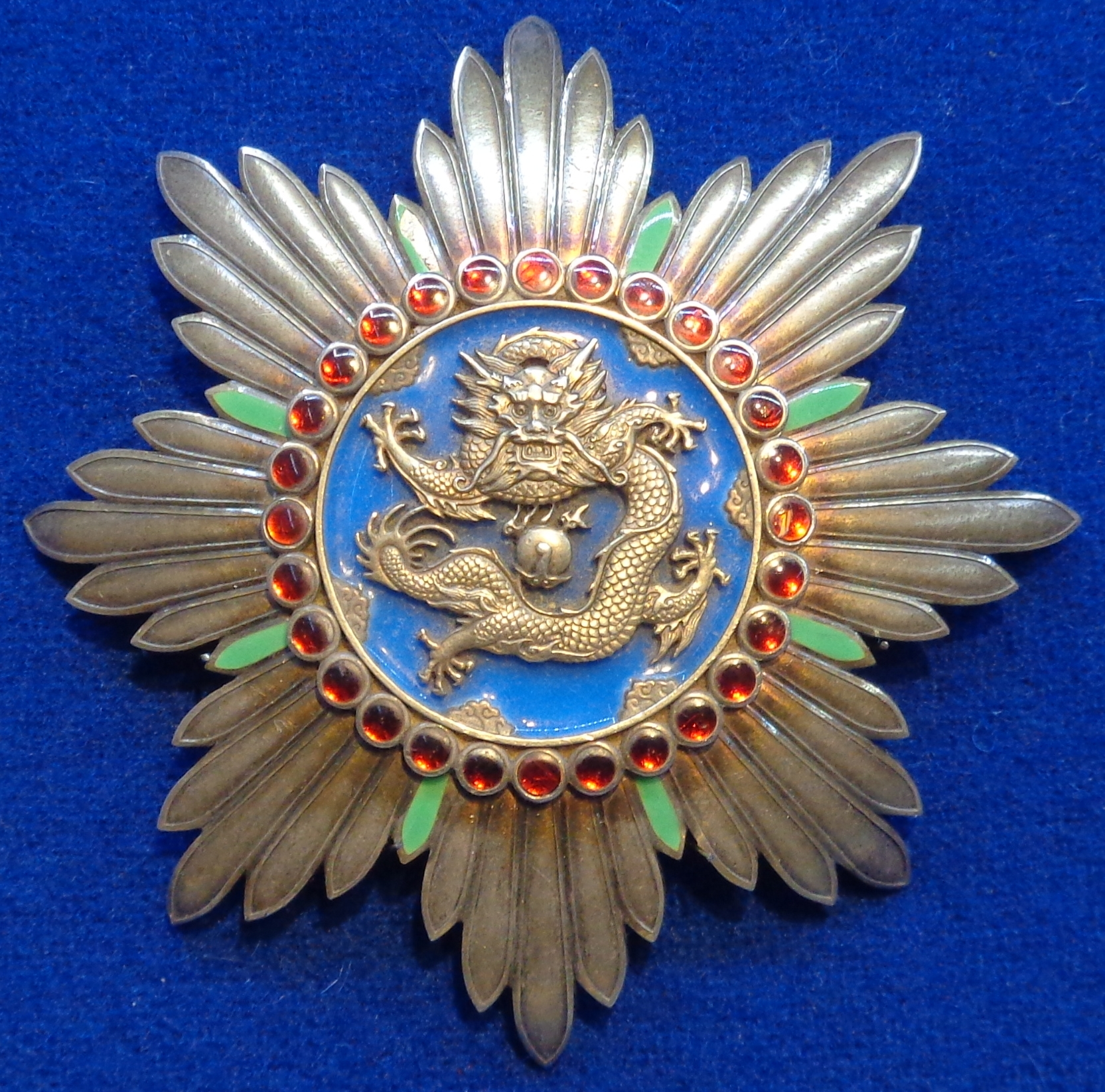
- Breast star of the Order.

Awarded by Manchukuo
- Type: Order of chivalry
- Established: 1 March 1934
- Country: Manchukuo
- Status: Obsolete
- Founder: Puyi
- Classes: Grand Cordon

Statistics
- First induction: 1934
- Last induction: 1940
- Total inductees: 33

Precedence
- Next (higher): Grand Order of the Orchid Blossom
- Next (lower): Order of the Auspicious Clouds
- Equivalent: Order of the Paulownia Flowers
- Ribbon bar

The Order of the Illustrious Dragon (Chinese: 龍光章; pinyin: Lóngguāng zhāng) was an award of Manchoukuo. It was established by Imperial Decree No. 1 on 1 March 1934 and published by law of 19 April 1934. The order consisted of only one class: Grand Cordon. The order was the equivalent of the Japanese Order of the Paulownia Flowers.

== Design ==
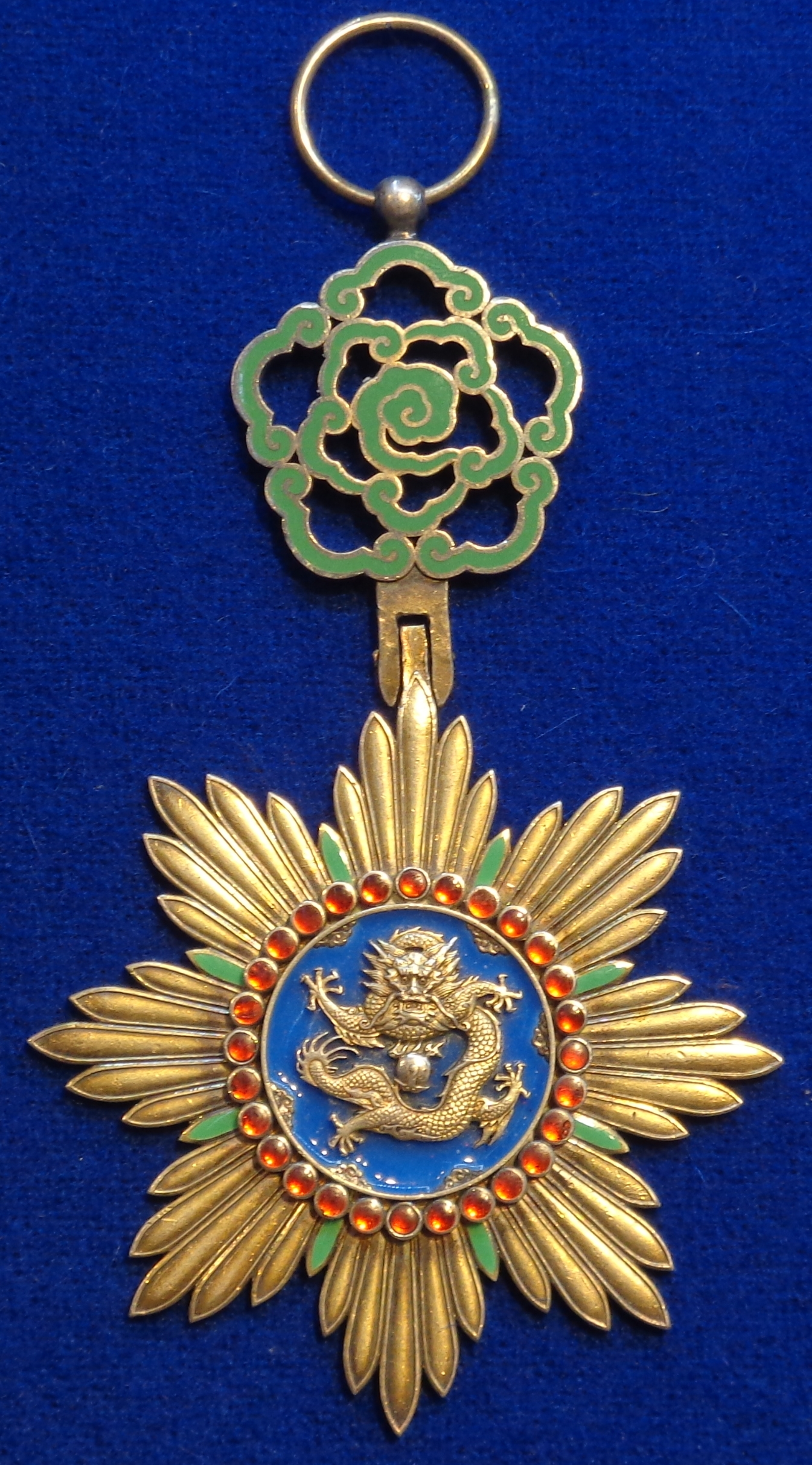
Badge of the Order.

The gold medal is star-shaped and consists of eight bundles of five smooth golden rays each. There is a green, enamelled short beam between each individual beam. The medallion is surrounded by 28 red jewels and shows a stylized Chinese dragon in the center, which is accompanied by a piece of a golden cloud. The dragon itself represented the Emperor, Puyi. The medal of the order and the associated order star match in their appearance. The gem has an openwork, green enamel hanger that shows a stylized cloud group consisting of a central cloud vortex and two concentric pentagons. The corresponding rosette is white and shows a blue ring in the middle. On the reverse side of the badge there are four characters - "勲功位章" ("Order of Merit Badge").

The sign through a rectangular bracket on the upper beam is attached to an intermediate link of light green enamel, which is an openwork slotted pentagon, into which a similar smaller pentagon and a spiral are inscribed, symbolizing clouds. At the upper end of the intermediate link there is a transverse eyelet with a ring for attaching to the order's ribbon.

The award was worn on a blue sash with white stripes, representing the sun and a white sun, from the right shoulder and a breast star.

== Recipients ==
It was awarded 33 times and was discontinued in 1945 after the Soviet invasion of Manchuria.

- (El Salvador) Maximiliano Hernández Martínez
- (Japan) Hideki Tojo
- (Manchukuo) Puyi

== Bibliography ==
- Ionina, N. Pu Yi and Manchukuo awards, 100 great awards. Veche, 2006. ISBN 5-7838-1171-8, pp. 155-157.
- Kua, Paul L. T. Manchukuo's Award System and Some of its Lesser Known Awards, The Journal of the Orders and Medals Society of America, 1998. Vol. 49, no. 1. pp. 17-26.
- Neubecker, Ottfried. On the orders of Manchukuo, Uniforms Market. Issue 8, p. 5
- Peterson, James W. Orders and Medals of Japan and Associated States, Orders and Medals Society of America, 2000, 3. Edition, ISBN 978-1890974091, p. 140.
- Rozanov, O. N. Japan: History in awards. Russian political encyclopedia (ROSSPEN), 2001. ISBN 5-8243-0235-9, pp. 103-110.
- Rozanov, O. N. Reward systems in the politics and ideology of the countries of North-East Asia, Monuments of historical thought, 2008. ISBN 978-5-88451-238-2, pp. 131-137.
- Usov, V. N. The last emperor of China: Pu Yi (1906-1967), Olma-Press, 2003. ISBN 5-224-04249-6, pp. 177-178.
