= Order of Saparmyrat Türkmenbaşy the Great =

State award of Turkmenistan

Order of Saparmurat Türkmenbaşy the Great Türkmenistanyň ilkinji Prezidenti Beýik Saparmyrat Türkmenbaşy (Turkmen)
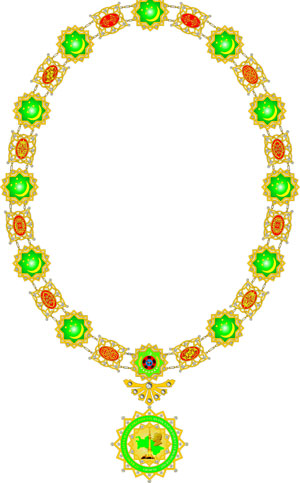

Awarded by Turkmenistan
- Type: Order
- Eligibility: Turkmen and foreigners
- Awarded for: Outstanding achievements
- Sovereign: President Saparmyrat Nyýazow

Precedence
- Next (higher): Watan Order
- Next (lower): Star of President Order

Order of Saparmyrat Türkmenbaşy the Great (Turkmen: Türkmenistanyň ilkinji Prezidenti Beýik Saparmyrat Türkmenbaşy) is a state award of Turkmenistan established by President Gurbanguly Berdimuhamedow in honour of his predecessor, Saparmyrat Nyýazow. The decree constituting its establishment was signed on 29 November 2007.

== Statute ==
This order is awarded only to outstanding state and public figures – the highest officials of foreign countries. The awarding of the order is made for the following reasons:

- A significant contribution to strengthening peace in the region and the world, the development of friendly relations
- Enhancing the international authority of Turkmenistan
- Special merits in the development of political, economic and cultural relations of other states with Turkmenistan
- Merits in the consolidation and strengthening of the country's independence and neutrality
- Contributions in maintaining mutual harmony, cohesion and unity, peace, friendship and cooperation between peoples
- Merits in the development and consolidation of inter-parliamentary and international relations

== Description ==
The order is made in the form of a chain of 750 gold sample, consisting of 24 links, 12 of which are in the form of a hexagon of two intertwined octahedrons, and the other 12 are made in the form of stylised national patterns. All links are decorated with diamonds. In the center, against the background of white enamel, another hexagon is shown, consisting of two intertwined octahedrons, which depict divergent sun rays, a map of Turkmenistan made of glassy green enamel, and a relief image in gold profile of President Niyazov and the Independence Monument.

Notable recipients have included:

- Sheikh Khalifa bin Zayed Al Nahayan, President of the United Arab Emirates
- Hu Jintao, General Secretary of the Chinese Communist Party (2008)
