= Collar day =

Collar days are designated days on which the collar forming part of the insignia of certain members of British orders of knighthood may be worn.

Collars are special large and elaborate ceremonial metal chains worn over the shoulders, hanging equally over the front and back, often tied with a bow at the shoulders, with a distinctive pendant attached to the front.

== Collar days in the United Kingdom ==
Collars are worn by Knights and Ladies Companion of the Order of the Garter, Knights and Ladies of the Order of the Thistle, and Knights and Dames Grand Cross of other orders. Of the last mentioned, the only currently active orders are the Order of the Bath, the Order of Saint Michael and Saint George, the Royal Victorian Order and the Order of the British Empire; the Order of Saint Patrick, the Order of the Star of India and the Order of the Indian Empire are now in abeyance. The collar can be worn on specific collar days throughout the year.

Collar days, in accordance with instructions of the Central Chancery of the Orders of Knighthood, are:

date	day	status
variable	Easter Sunday	current
variable	Easter Monday	abeyance
variable	Easter Tuesday	abeyance
variable	Ascension Day	current
variable	Whit Sunday	current
variable	Whit Monday	abeyance
variable	Whit Tuesday	abeyance
variable	Trinity Sunday	current
1 January	New Year's Day	current
6 January	Epiphany	current
25 January	Conversion of St Paul	current
2 February	Presentation of Christ in the Temple (also called Candlemas)	current
24 February	St Matthias' Day	current
1 March	St David's Day	current
17 March	St Patrick's Day	abeyance
25 March	Lady Day (also called Annunciation Day)	current
23 April	St George's Day	current
25 April	St Mark's Day	abeyance
1 May	St Philip and St James' Day	abeyance
6 May	The King's Coronation	current
29 May	Restoration of the Royal Family	current
24 June	St John the Baptist's Day	current
29 June	St Peter's Day	abeyance
25 July	St James' Day	abeyance
6 August	Transfiguration Day	current
24 August	St Bartholomew's Day	abeyance
8 September	The King's Accession	current
21 September	St Matthew's Day	current
29 September	St Michael and All Angels' Day	current
18 October	St Luke's Day	abeyance
28 October	St Simon and St Jude's Day	abeyance
1 November	All Saints' Day	current
14 November	The King's Birthday	current
30 November	St Andrew's Day	current
21 December	St Thomas' Day	abeyance
25 December	Christmas Day	current
26 December	St Stephen's Day	current
28 December	Holy Innocents' Day	current

Collars are also worn when the King opens or prorogues Parliament, and for a few other observances, including religious services of the various orders, and by those taking part in the ceremony of introduction of a peer in the House of Lords.
