= Grand Order of the Orchid Blossom =

Military order of Manchukuo

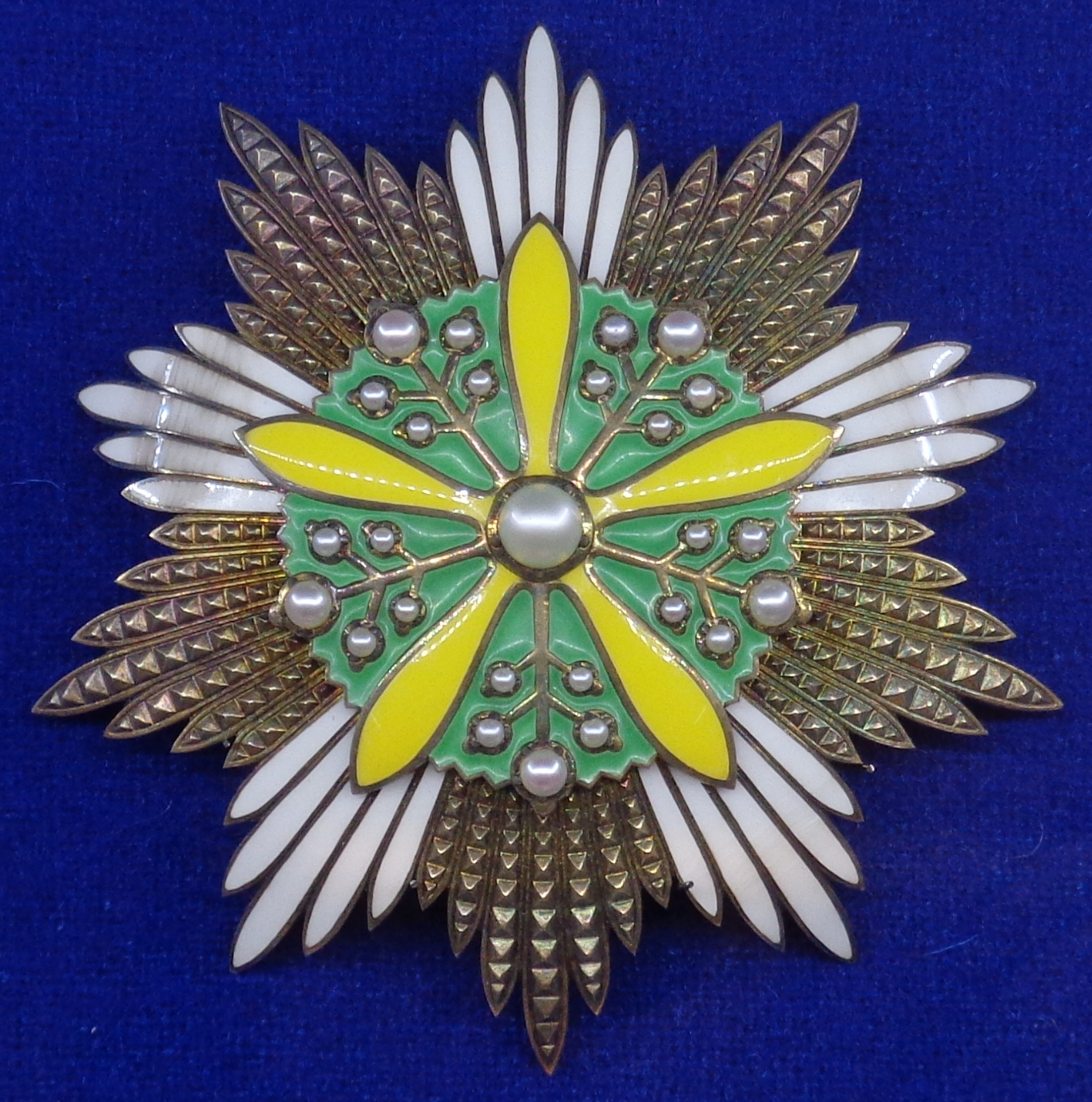
- Breast star of the Order.

Awarded by Manchukuo
- Type: Order of chivalry
- Established: 1 March 1934
- Country: Manchukuo
- Status: Obsolete
- Founder: Puyi
- Classes: Grand Collar; Grand Cordon

Statistics
- First induction: 1934
- Last induction: Unknown
- Total inductees: 3, possibly more

Precedence
- Next (lower): Order of the Illustrious Dragon
- Equivalent: Order of the Chrysanthemum
- Ribbon bar

The Grand Order of the Orchid Blossom (Chinese: 大勲位蘭花章; pinyin: Dàxūnwèi lánhuā zhāng) was an award of Manchoukuo. It was established by Imperial Decree No. 1 on 1 March 1934 and published by law of 19 April 1934. The order consisted of only two classes: Grand Collar and Grand Cordon. The order was the equivalent of the Japanese Order of the Chrysanthemum.

== Design ==
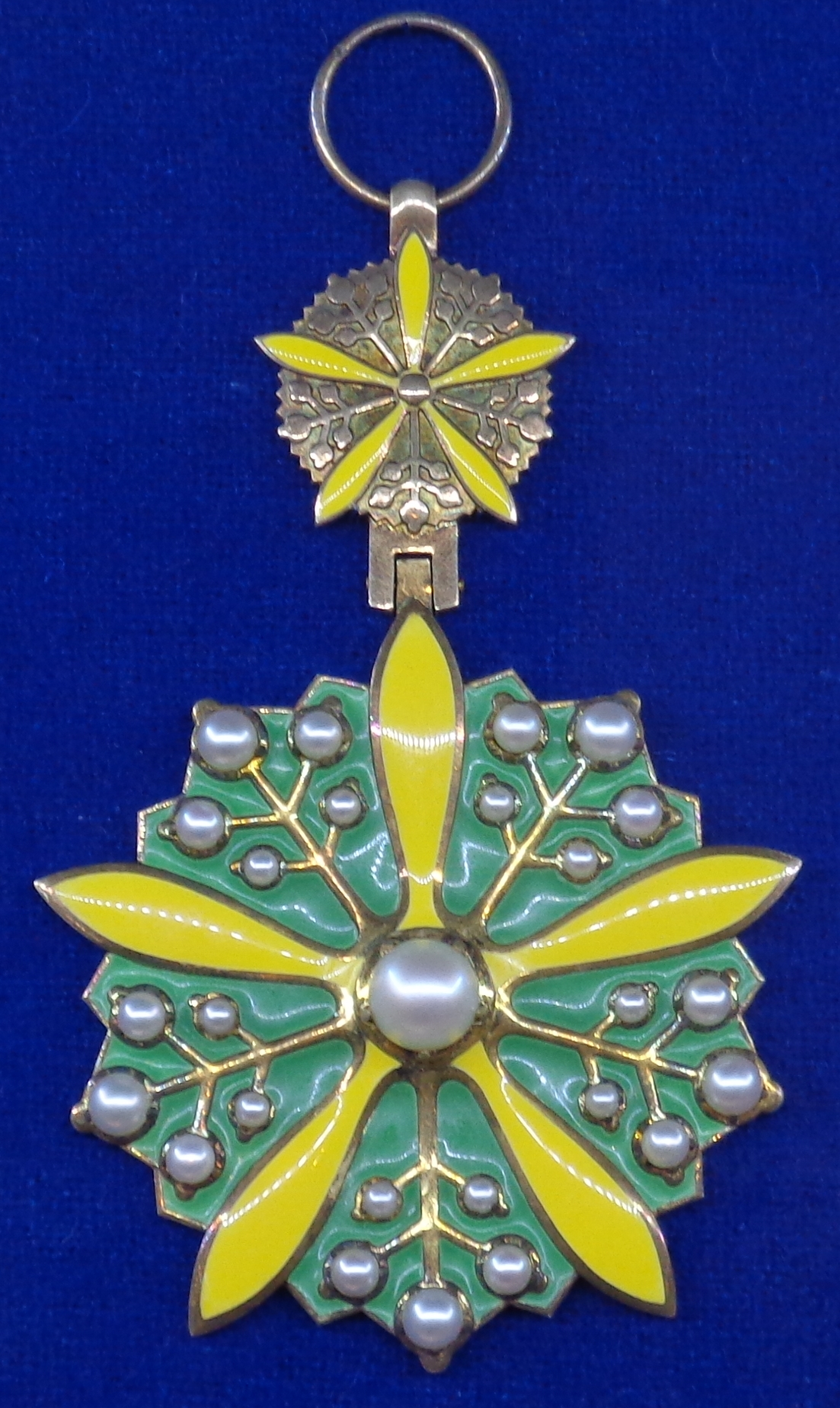
Collar of the Order.

The design was chosen to be an orchid because it was reportedly Puyi's favorite flower.

The collar consists of one central large link and 20 small links, interconnected by figured intermediate links in the form of a Buddhist "endless knot". Small chain links are openwork slotted pentagons with rounded corners, symbolizing clouds. Eight of them are inscribed covered with green enamel "eight auspicious signs of Buddha": to the left of the central link - a lotus flower, a precious vessel, two fish and an endless knot; to the right of the central link - the shell, the wheel of learning, the precious umbrella and the banner of victory. The central link is an openwork slotted hexagon, symbolizing a cloud, into which a round medallion of blue enamel is inscribed. The medallion depicts a dragon "in the clouds" wriggling around the flaming Sun.

The cordon is gold, with a diameter of 71 mm, it is a stylized image of the main imperial symbol - an orchid flower. On the obverse, the badge looks like a round jagged medallion of green enamel, on which a star of five narrow “petals” of yellow enamel is superimposed. A large pearl is fixed in the center of the star, between the "petals" there are golden stalks with fixed small pearls, five in each corner. On the reverse side of the badge there are four characters: "大勲位章" ("the highest award for merit"). Through a rectangular bracket on the upper "petal" the sign is attached to an intermediate link, which is a reduced copy of the sign itself, without enamels and pearls. At the upper end of the intermediate link there is a transverse eyelet for attaching to the order chain.

The order was the highest award of the empire. The Order of the Orchid Blossom was divided into two classes: the collar (大勲位蘭花章頸飾) and the cordon (大勲位蘭花大綬章). The collar was intended for monarchs and heads of state on a large ribbon.

== Recipients ==
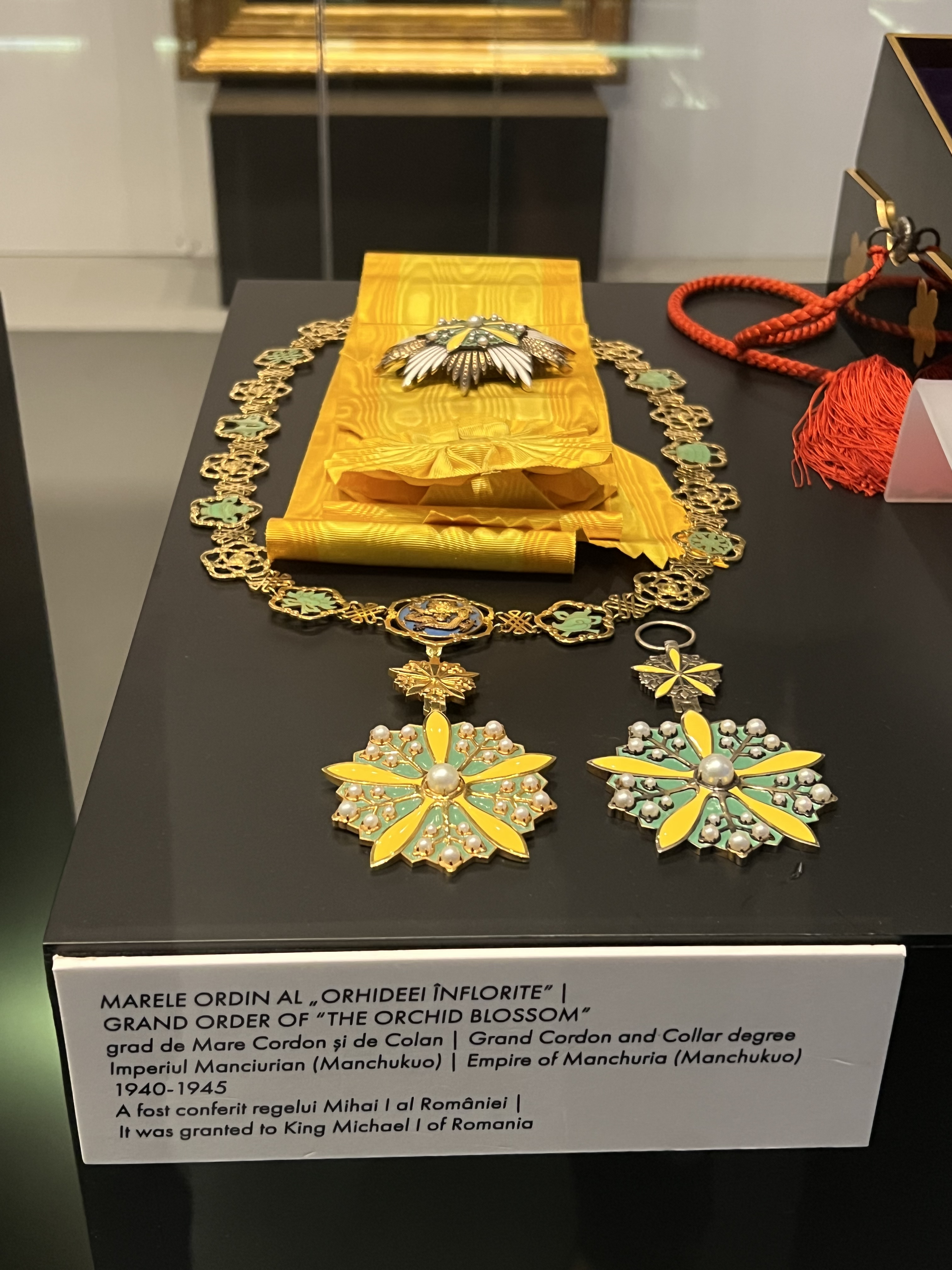
The order awarded to King Michael I of Romania, on display at the National History Museum of Romania.

It was awarded at least 3 times and was discontinued in 1945 after the Soviet invasion of Manchuria.

- (Empire of Japan) Hirohito
- (Manchukuo) Puyi
- (Kingdom of Romania) Michael I

The order may have been awarded to other kings, but there is not enough information to prove or disprove this claim.

== Bibliography ==
- Ionina, N. Pu Yi and Manchukuo awards, 100 great awards. Veche, 2006. ISBN 5-7838-1171-8, pp. 155–157.
- Kua, Paul L. T. Manchukuo's Award System and Some of its Lesser Known Awards, The Journal of the Orders and Medals Society of America, 1998. Vol. 49, no. 1. pp. 17–26.
- Neubecker, Ottfried. On the orders of Manchukuo, Uniforms Market. Issue 8, p. 5
- Peterson, James W. Orders and Medals of Japan and Associated States, Orders and Medals Society of America, 2000, 3. Edition, ISBN 978-1890974091, p. 140.
- Rozanov, O. N. Japan: History in awards. Russian political encyclopedia (ROSSPEN), 2001. ISBN 5-8243-0235-9, pp. 103–110.
- Rozanov, O. N. Reward systems in the politics and ideology of the countries of North-East Asia, Monuments of historical thought, 2008. ISBN 978-5-88451-238-2, pp. 131–137.
- Usov, V. N. The last emperor of China: Pu Yi (1906-1967), Olma-Press, 2003. ISBN 5-224-04249-6, pp. 177–178.
