= Order of St. Prince Lazar =

Order of Saint Prince Lazar Орден светог кнеза Лазара
- Grand Collar of the order

Awarded by Kingdom of Serbia Kingdom of Yugoslavia House of Karađorđević
- Type: State order (1889–1945); Dynastic order (since 1945)
- Established: 28 June 1889
- Royal house: Obrenović (until 1903); Karađorđević (from 1903)
- Awarded for: Monarch and Heir apparent (only)
- Status: Last appointment in 1941; Dormant order since 1945
- Grand Master: Crown Prince Alexander
- Grades: Knight Grand Collar

Statistics
- Total inductees: 5 + 3

Precedence
- Next (lower): Royal Order of Karađorđe's Star

The Order of Saint Prince Lazar (Serbian: Орден Светог кнеза Лазара, romanized: Orden Svetog kneza Lazara) was a royal order created by King Alexander I of Serbia to commemorate the five hundredth anniversary of the Battle of Kosovo that took place on the 28 June 1389. It must not be confused with the Order of Saint Lazarus. The order is named after Prince Lazar who commanded the Serbian armies in the battle. The Order is worn only by the King of Serbia / King of Yugoslavia and by his Crown Prince (when of majority).

== History ==
The order of Saint Prince Lazar was instituted by the Decision of the Parliament, signed by the King Aleksandar I, to commemorate the fifth centenary of the Battle of Kosovo (28 June 1389), that ended in the collapse of the medieval Serbian state. Saint Prince Lazar, of the Hrebeljanović family, commanded the Serbian armies that were defeated by the Ottoman Sultan Murat I. The Sultan was assassinated by Serbian knight Miloš Obilić, while captured the Serbian Prince was beheaded by the victorious Turks. The cult of the Saint Prince was very strong among Serbs, and the event was reckoned to be the paramount one in the entire history of Serbs. The commemoration of the 500th Anniversary took form of the Anointment of the King, and the Collar of Saint Prince Lazar ordered to be made by Nicolaus und Dunker of Hannau (Germany). The Order is worn only by the King of Serbia and by his Crown Prince (when of majority). Since inception, the Order has been worn only by the following:

== Rewarding ==
The Collar of the Order was allowed to be worn only by the ruler of Serbia (later Yugoslavia) and the heir to the throne:

Name	Date awarded
King Alexander I of Serbia	28 June 1889
King Peter I of Serbia	15 June 1903
Crown Prince George of Serbia	27 August 1905
King Alexander I of Yugoslavia	27 March 1909
King Peter II of Yugoslavia	28 March 1941

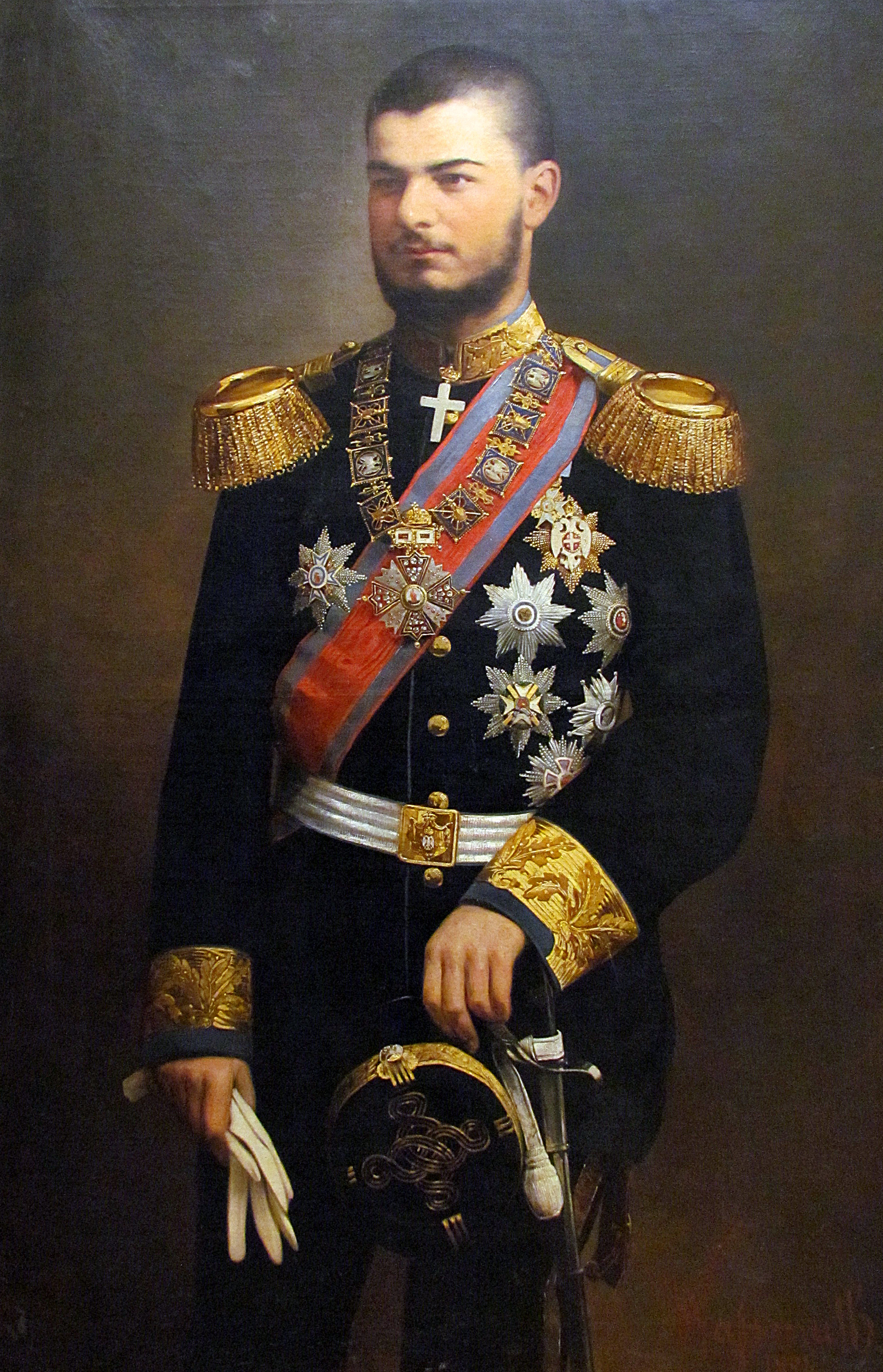
Aleksandar I, King of Serbia 1889–1903

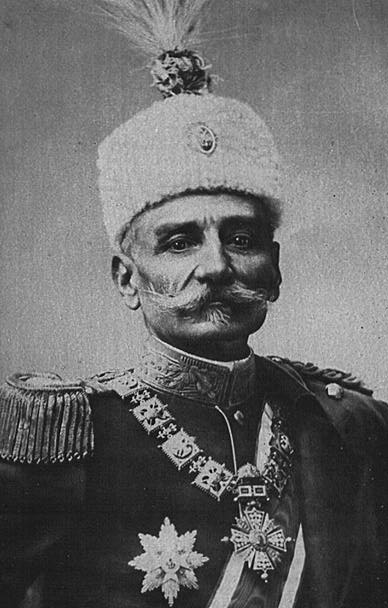
Peter I, King of Serbia and King of Serbs, Croats and Slovenes 1903–1921

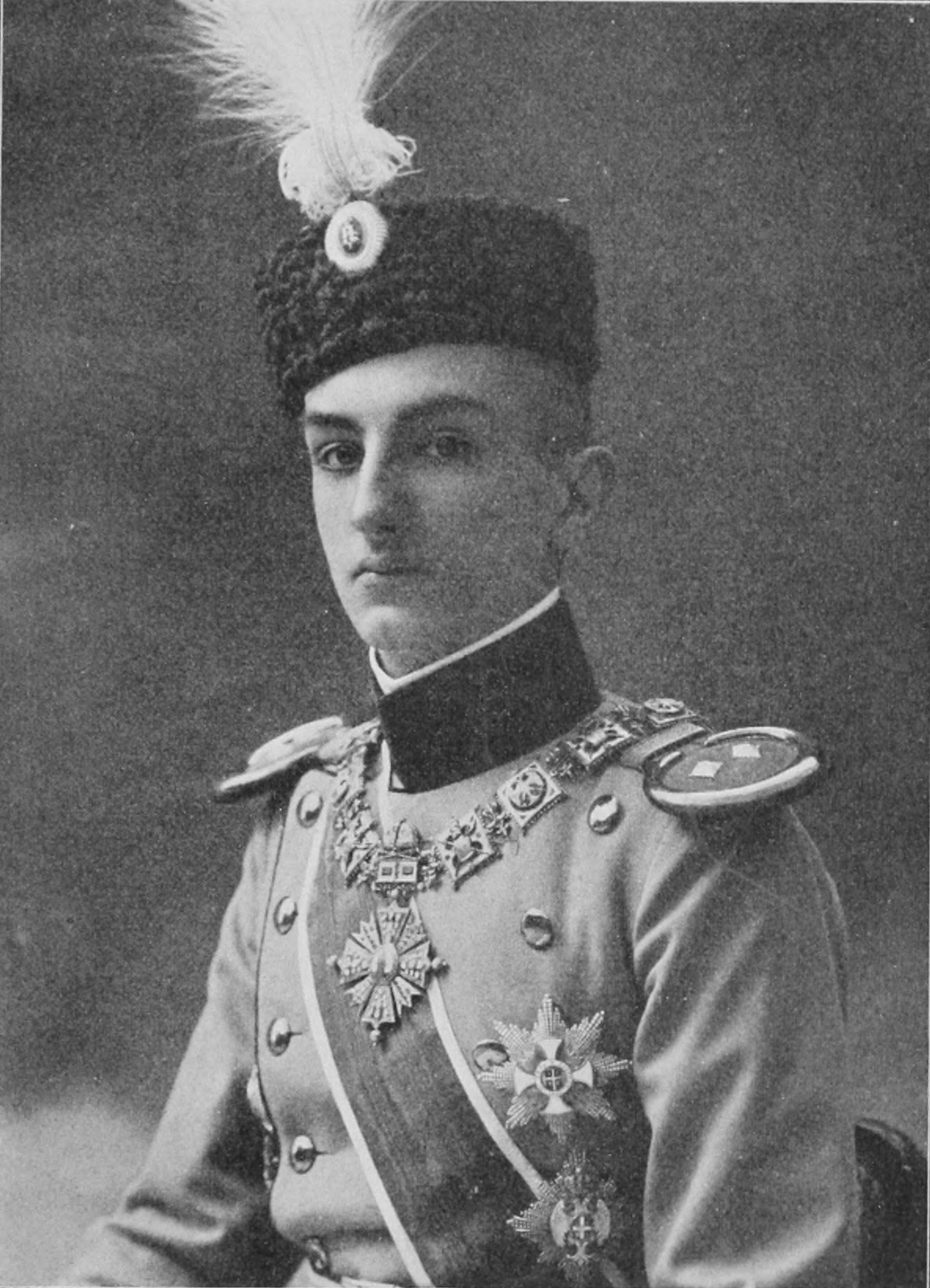
George, Crown Prince of Serbia 1903–1909

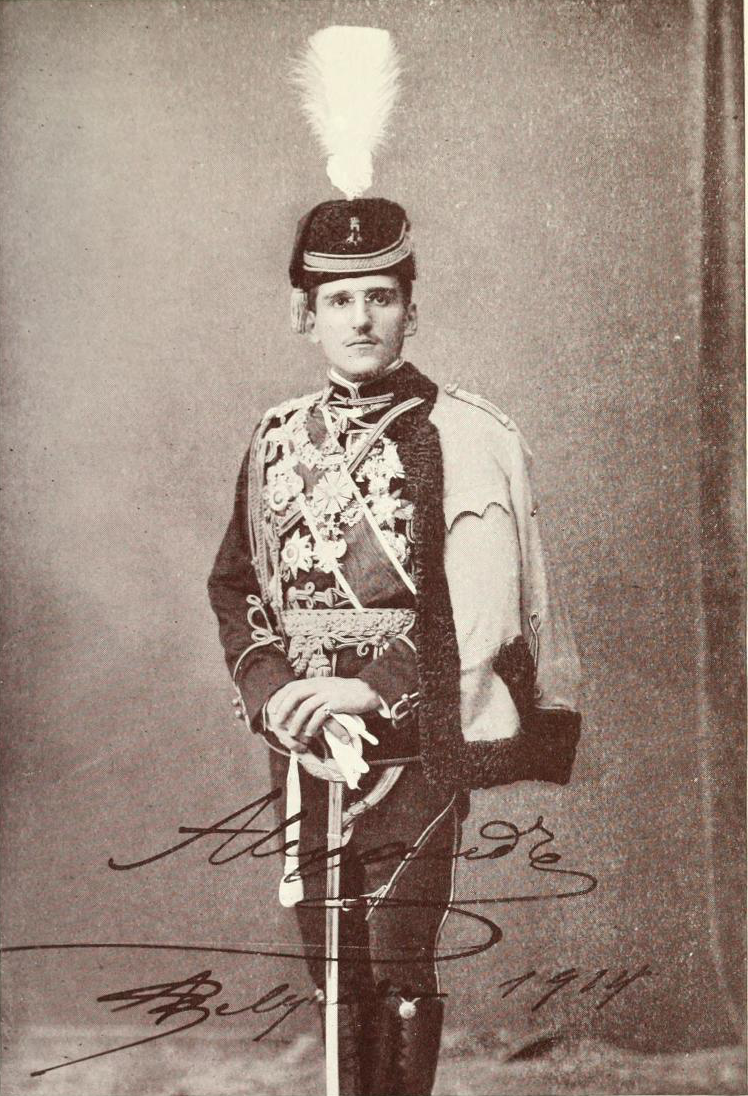
Alexander I, Crown Prince of Serbia 1909–1921, King of Serbs, Croats and Slovenes and King of Yugoslavia 1921–1934

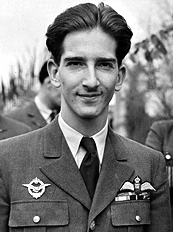
Peter II, King of Yugoslavia 1934–1945

== Titular holder of the order ==
Name	Date Awarded	Notes
Crown Prince Alexander of Yugoslavia	17 July 1963	In exile
Hereditary Prince Peter of Yugoslavia	5 February 1998	In exile; renounced succession in 2022
Hereditary Prince Philip of Yugoslavia	27 April 2022	Titular holder after brother's renunciation

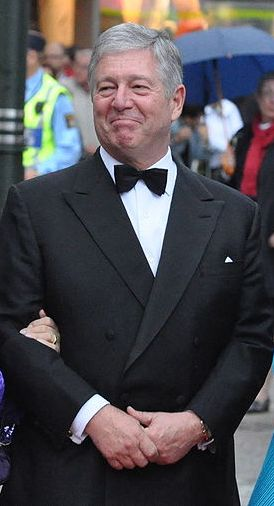
Alexander, Crown Prince of Yugoslavia
1963

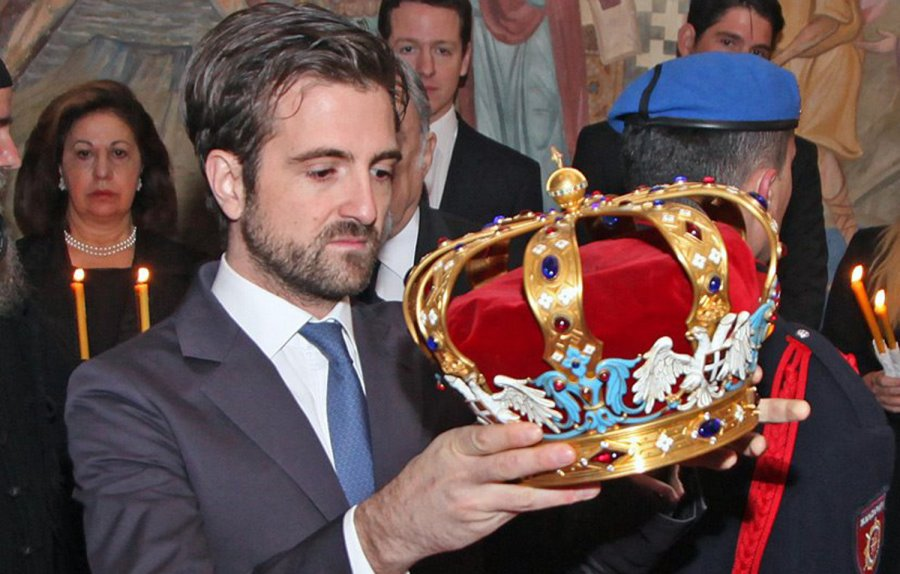
Peter, Hereditary Prince of Yugoslavia
1998

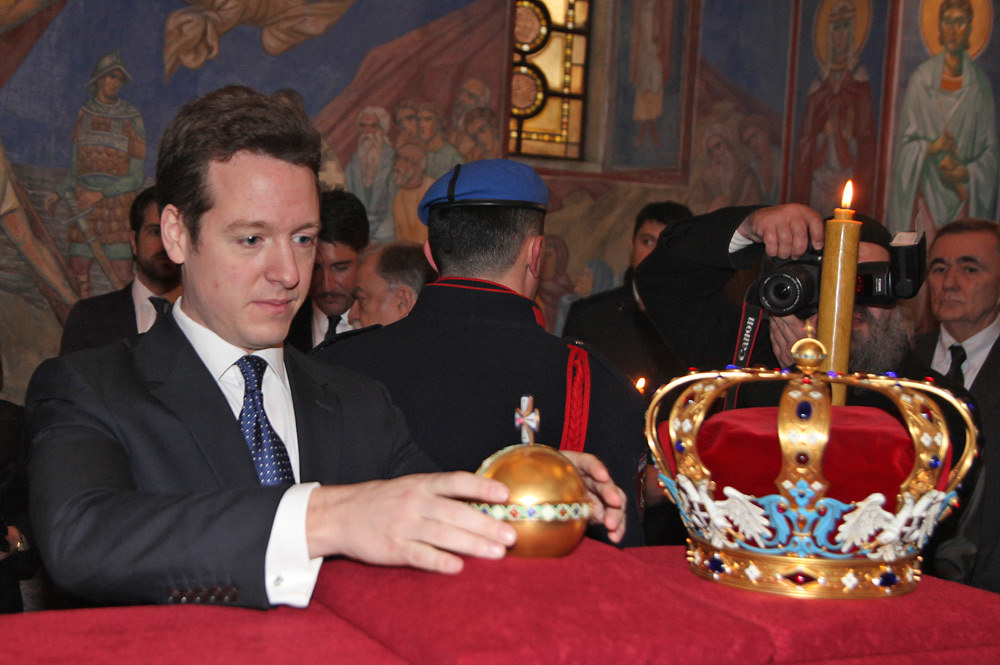
Philip, Hereditary Prince of Yugoslavia
2022

== Sign and a chain of the Order ==
Sign and a chain of the Order were made of gold and richly decorated with rubies, sapphires, emeralds, diamonds and pearls. Order for production was the German firm Nicolaus und Dunker. Sketches awards carried a professor of archeology Michael Valtrović.

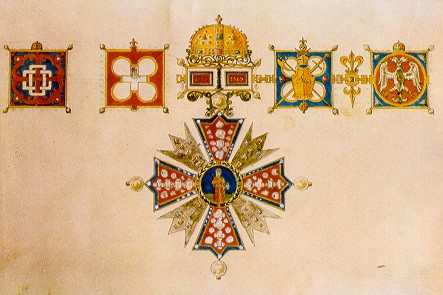
The front side of the sign

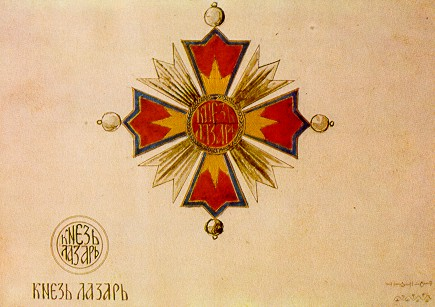
Reverse
