= Watan Order =

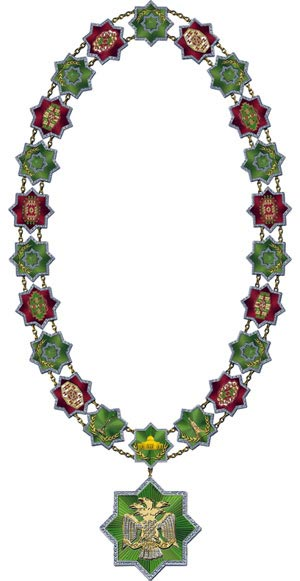
Watan Order

The Watan Order (Turkmen for 'Motherland Order') is the highest national order of Turkmenistan. It can only be awarded to the current president, and only once in the president's tenure, for "outstanding achievements in domestic and foreign policies." The order was created for Gurbanguly Berdimuhamedow by Turkmenistan's rubberstamp parliament in 2007, and Berdimuhamedow was subsequently made the first ever recipient on his 50th birthday.
