= Politics of Manchukuo =

Manchukuo was a puppet state set up by the Empire of Japan in Manchuria which existed from 1931 to 1945. The Manchukuo regime was established four months after the Japanese withdrawal from Shanghai with Puyi as the nominal but powerless head of state to add some semblance of legitimacy, as he was a former emperor and an ethnic Manchu.

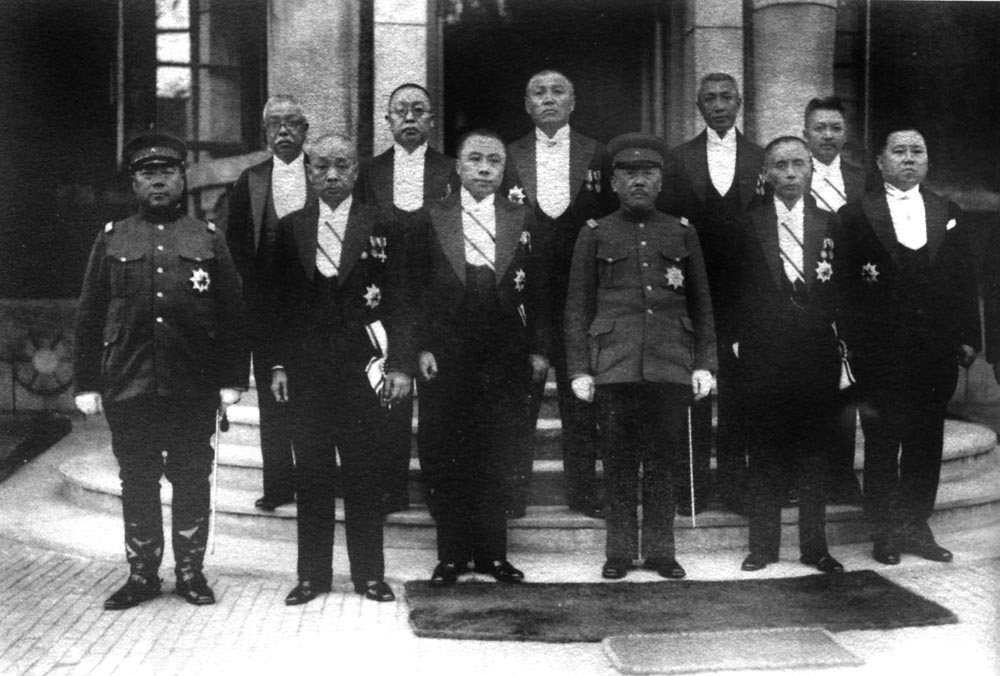
Manchukuo Politicians-Front row, from left: Yu Zhishan (於芷山), Minister of military affairs; Xie Jieshi (謝介石), Ambassador to Japan; Xi Qia, Chief of imperial household agency; Zhang Jinghui, Prime Minister; Zang Shiyi, President of the senate; Lü Ronghuan (呂榮寰), Minister of civil affairs; Ding Jianxiu (丁鑑修), Minister of industry. Rear row, from left: Yuan Jinkai (袁金鎧), Minister of Palatine affairs; Li Shaogeng (李紹庚), Minister of traffic; Ruan Zhenduo (阮振鐸), Minister of education; Zhang Yanqing (張燕卿), Minister of foreign affairs.

== Government ==
Manchukuo was proclaimed a monarchy on 1 March 1934, with former Qing dynasty emperor Puyi assuming the Manchukuo throne under the reign name of Emperor Kang-de. An imperial rescript issued the same day, promulgated the organic law of the new state, establishing a Privy Council, a Legislative Council and the State Council to "advise and assist the emperor in the discharge of his duties". The Privy Council was an appointive body consisting of Puyi's closest friends and confidants, and the Legislative Council was largely an honorary body without authority. The State Council was therefore the center of political power in Manchukuo. The organic law was largely an abridged version of the Imperial Japanese Constitution, with an important difference being the lack of any mention of civil rights and the increased authority of the Privy Council. As with all other aspects of Manchukuo, the government was purely ceremonial and existed to authenticate the puppet state rather than to rule the people of Manchukuo. True authority remained in the hands of the Kwantung Army.

=== Composition ===
Cabinet members
Portfolio	Minister	Took office	Left office	Ref
Prime Minister	Zheng Xiaoxu	9 March 1932	21 May 1935	
Prime Minister	Zhang Jinghui	21 May 1935	18 August 1945	
Minister of Foreign Affairs	Xie Jieshi	1932	1935	
Minister of Foreign Affairs	Zhang Yanqing	1935	May 1937	
Minister of Foreign Affairs	Zhang Jinghui	May 1937	July 1937	
Minister of Foreign Affairs	Shoichi Kanki	July 1937	April 1938	
Minister of Foreign Affairs	Ts'ai Yün-sheng	April 1938	May 1940	
Minister of Foreign Affairs	Wei Huan-chang	May 1940	September 1942	
Minister of Foreign Affairs	Li Shaogeng	September 1942	April 1944	
Minister of Foreign Affairs	Ruan Zhenduo	April 1944	18 August 1945	
Minister of Defense	Ma Zhanshan	9 March 1932	7 April 1932	
Minister of Defense	Zhang Jinghui	7 April 1932	20 May 1935	
Minister of Defense	Yu Zhishan	21 May 1935	24 April 1939	
Minister of Defense	Yu Yucheng	24 April 1939	September 1942	
Minister of Defense	Xing Shilian	September 1942	18 August 1945	
Minister of Finance	Xi Qia	9 March 1932	21 May 1935	
Minister of Finance	Sun Qichang	21 May 1935	September 1942	
Minister of Finance	Han Yün-chie	May 1937	May 1940	
Minister of Finance	Ts'ai Yün-sheng	May 1940	September 1942	
Minister of Finance	Ruan Zhenduo	September 1942	April 1944	
Minister of Finance	Yü Ching-yüan	December 1944	18 August 1945	
Minister of Economic Affairs	Zhang Yanqing	March 1932	May 1935	
Minister of Economic Affairs	Ding Jianxiu	May 1935	May 1937	
Minister of Economic Affairs	Lü Ronghuan	May 1937	May 1940	
Minister of Economic Affairs	Yü Ching-yüan	May 1940	September 1942	
Minister of Economic Affairs	Huang Fu-qün	September 1942	18 August 1945	
Minister of Transport	Ding Jianxiu	March 1932	March 1935	
Minister of Transport	Li Shaogeng	March 1935	December 1940	
Minister of Transport	Ruan Zhenduo	December 1940	September 1942	
Minister of Transport	Ku Tz'u-heng	January 1941	September 1942	
Minister of Health	Zang Shiyi	March 1932	March 1935	
Minister of Health	Lü Ronghuan	March 1935	May 1937	
Minister of Health	Sun Qichang	May 1937	May 1940	
Minister of Health	Lü Ronghuan	May 1940	January 1941	
Minister of Health	Ku Tz'u-heng	January 1941	September 1942	
Minister of Health	Yü Ching-yüan	September 1942	December 1944	
Minister of Health	Chin Ming-shih	April 1944	18 August 1945	
Minister of Education	Ruan Zhenduo	May 1935	July 1937	
Lord Keeper of the Privy Seal	Ko Tzung-hsi	March 1934	December 1934	
Lord Keeper of the Privy Seal	Yuan Jinkai	February 1935	April 1944	
Lord Keeper of the Privy Seal	Chi-hsing	April 1944	18 August 1945	

== Political parties and movements ==
During his administration, the Kangde Emperor, in an interview with foreign journalists, mentioned his interest in forming a political party with Confucian doctrines. The Japanese "native" establishment, however, organized some right-wing and nationalist parties, in the Shōwa militarist mould. Such movements, which had official status, were:

- Concordia Association (State-sponsored political party)
- Northeast Administrative Committee (Manchukuo nationalist local party)
- White Russian Fascist Party (later the Russian Fascist Party; White Russian anti-communist party in Manchukuo, used the swastika as the party symbol, and guided by a Russian fascist "Duce")
- Bureau for Russian Emigrants in Manchuria (BREM) led by General Vladimir Kislitsin
- Monarquic Party (White Russian Tsarist Monarchic party with Japanese approval)
- Betarim Jew Zionist Movement (Jewish rights movement in Manchukuo)
- Far Eastern Jewish Council (Jewish Zionist council in Harbin, Manchukuo led by Dr. Abraham Kaufman, with Japanese Army support)

== Notable people ==
=== The Imperial Manchu Court ===
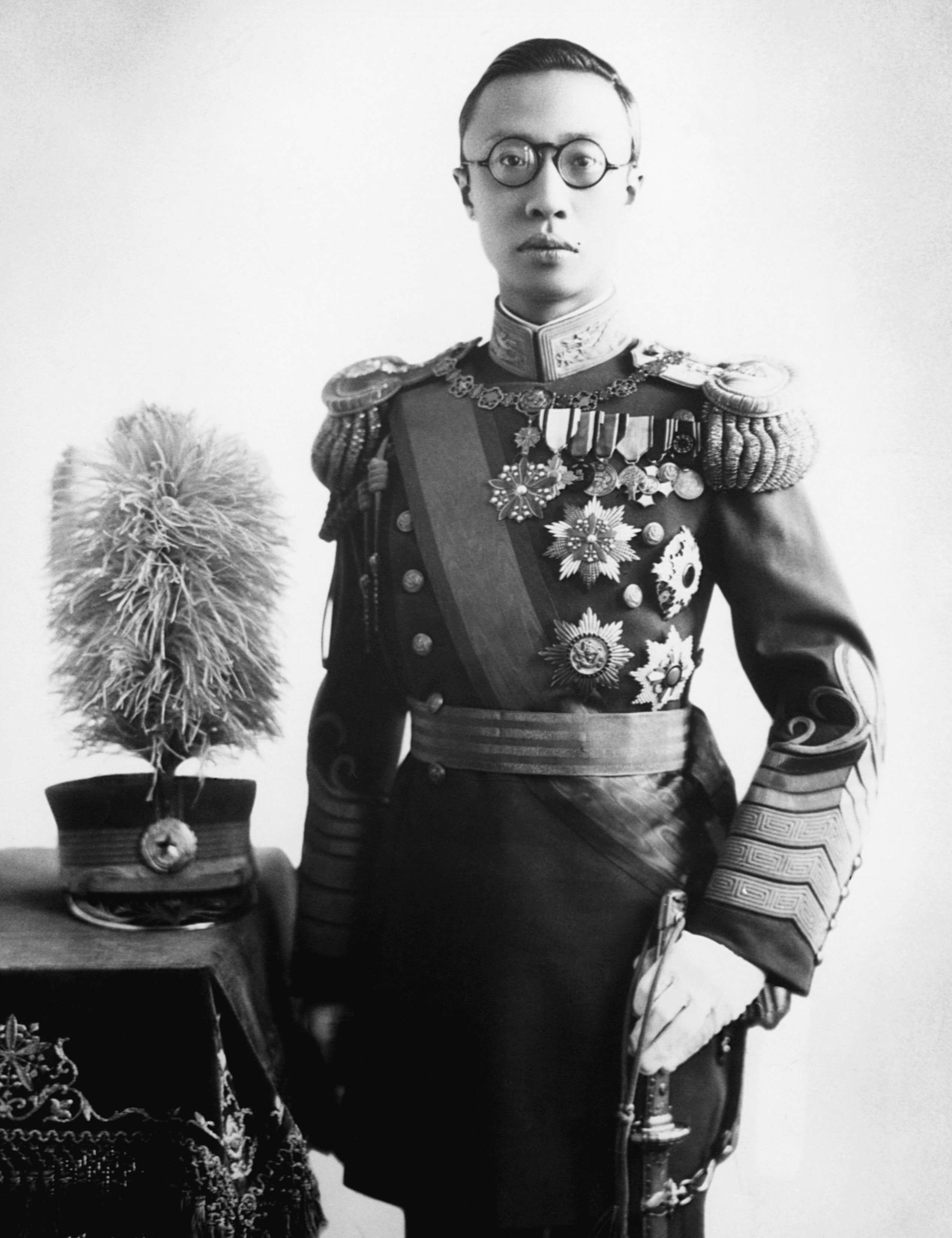
Puyi as Emperor of Manchukuo

- Aisin Gioro Henry Puyi (Kangde Emperor and head of state)
- Madame Wanrong (Empress and first wife of the Kangde Emperor)
- Prince Aisin Gioro Pujie (brother of Puyi, possible heir of Manchukuo Throne)
- Prince Aisin Gioro Puren (brother of Puyi)
- Prince Aisin Gioro Yuyan (nephew of Puyi)
- Hiro Saga (Japanese sister-in-law of the Kangde Emperor)
- Wenxiu (first concubine of the Emperor)
- Tan Yuling (2nd Wife of the Kangde Emperor)
- Li Yuqin (4th Wife of the Kangde Emperor)
- Princess Aisin Gioro Huisheng (daughter of Pu-Chieh and Hiro Saga)
- Princess Aisin Gioro Xianyu (distant relative)

=== Others (local) ===
- Bao Guancheng, Manchukuo's first ambassador in Tokyo
- Yuan Cheng-Tse, Manchukuo ambassador in Tokyo
- Li Shao-Keng, Manchukuo ambassador in Tokyo
- Gen. Tinge, Manchukuo diplomat in Tokyo
- Lu Yiwen, Manchukuo ambassador in Berlin

=== Kwantung Army ===
Commanders

No.	Portrait	Commander	Took office	Left office	Time in office
1	Shigeru Honjō	General; Shigeru Honjō (1876–1945)	1 August 1931	8 August 1932	1 year, 7 days
2	Nobuyoshi Mutō	Field Marshal; Nobuyoshi Mutō (1868–1933)	8 August 1932	27 July 1933 †	353 days
3	Takashi Hishikari	General; Takashi Hishikari (1871–1952)	29 July 1933	10 December 1934	1 year, 134 days
4	Jirō Minami	General; Jirō Minami (1874–1955)	10 December 1934	6 March 1936	1 year, 87 days
5	Kenkichi Ueda	General; Kenkichi Ueda (1875–1962)	6 March 1936	7 September 1939	3 years, 185 days
6	Yoshijirō Umezu	General; Yoshijirō Umezu (1882–1949)	7 September 1939	18 July 1944	4 years, 315 days
7	Otozō Yamada	General; Otozō Yamada (1881–1965)	18 July 1944	11 August 1945	1 year, 24 days

Chief of Staff

- Koji Miyake (10 August 1928 – 8 August 1932)
- Kuniaki Koiso (8 August 1932 – 5 March 1934)
- Toshizō Nishio (5 March 1934 – 23 March 1936)
- Seishirō Itagaki (23 March 1936 – 1 March 1937)
- Hideki Tōjō (1 March 1937 – 30 May 1938)
- Rensuke Isogai (18 June 1938 – 7 September 1939)
- Jo Iimura (7 September 1939 – 22 October 1940)
- Heitarō Kimura (22 October 1940 – 10 April 1941)
- Teiichi Yoshimoto (10 April 1941 – 1 August 1942)
- Yukio Kasahara (1 August 1942 – 7 April 1945)
- Hikosaburo Hata (7 April 1945 – 11 August 1945)

=== Others (Japanese) ===
- Nobusuke Kishi, Vice Minister of Industry (1937–1939), later post-war Prime Minister of Japan
- Chu Kudo, aide-de-camp to Emperor Puyi
- Yasunao Yoshioka, Army senior staff officer and Attaché to the Imperial Household in Manchukuo
- Kenjiro Hayashide, official Kangde emperor biographer and author of "Epochal Journey to Japan"
- Chiune Sugihara, diplomat in the Manchukuo Foreign Ministry
- Hoshino Naoki, Director of the General Affairs Board (1936–1940), Vice Minister of Finance (1936)
- Kenji Doihara, Japanese spymaster
- Norihiro Yasue, Army officer, author of the Fugu Plan
- Koreshige Inuzuka, Navy officer, co-author of the Fugu Plan
- Masahiko Amakasu, police chief (1932) and head of Manchukuo Film Association (1939–1945)
- Yoshisuke Aikawa, prominent industrialist, president of the Manchurian Industrial Development Company (1937–1942)
- Tatsunosuke Takasaki, prominent businessman, president of the Manchurian Industrial Development Company (1942–1945)
- Toranosuke Hashimoto, vice president of Privy Council (1937–1945)
- Genzo Yanagita, Commander, Kwantung Defense Command
- Kimio Miyagawa, Japanese Consul-general in Harbin
- Funao Miyakawa Japanese General Counselor in Vladivostok and then in Harbin
- Fumitaka Konoe, Army lieutenant, son and personal secretary of Prince Fumimaro Konoe
- Shun Akifusa Chief of military Mission in Harbin and political adviser to the white Russian political groups in same city
- Kenji Ishikawa head of a sabotage group of that mission
- Yutaka Takeoka intelligence officer and head of the Dairen military mission
- Saburo Asada head of the 2nd (Intelligence) department of the staff of the Kwantung Army
- Tamaki Kumazaki deputy chief of intelligence of Kwantung Army
- Hiroki Nohara deputy chief of Kwantung Army Intelligence
- Yoshio Itagaki deputy chief of Kwantung Army Intelligence and son of Seishiro Itagaki, war minister from 1938–1939

=== Others ===
- Genrikh Lyushkov, ex-Soviet Far East NKVD defector, adviser to Kwantung Army
- Konstantin Vladimirovich Rodzaevsky, White Russian anticommunist leader
- General Kislitsin, another White Russian anticommunist chief
- Abraham Kaufman, founder of Far Eastern Jewish Council and Betarim Jew Zionists Movement
- Trebitsch Lincoln, Hungarian pro-Japanese collaborator
- August Ponschab, German consul in Harbin, Manchuria
- Auguste Ernest Pierre Gaspais, Vatican representative in Harbin, Manchuria
- Charles Lemaire, Vatican diplomatic officer in Harbin, Manchuria
- Lian Yu, ambassador from the Japanese-sponsored Nanjing Nationalist Government
- Mariano Amoedo Galarmendi, Spanish chargé d'affaires to 1939
- Fernando Valdés Ibargüen, Count of Torata, Spanish minister 1941 to 1942
- José González de Gregorio y Arribas, Spanish chargé d'affaires 1942 to 1943, commercial attaché since 1940
