= Foreign relations of Manchukuo =

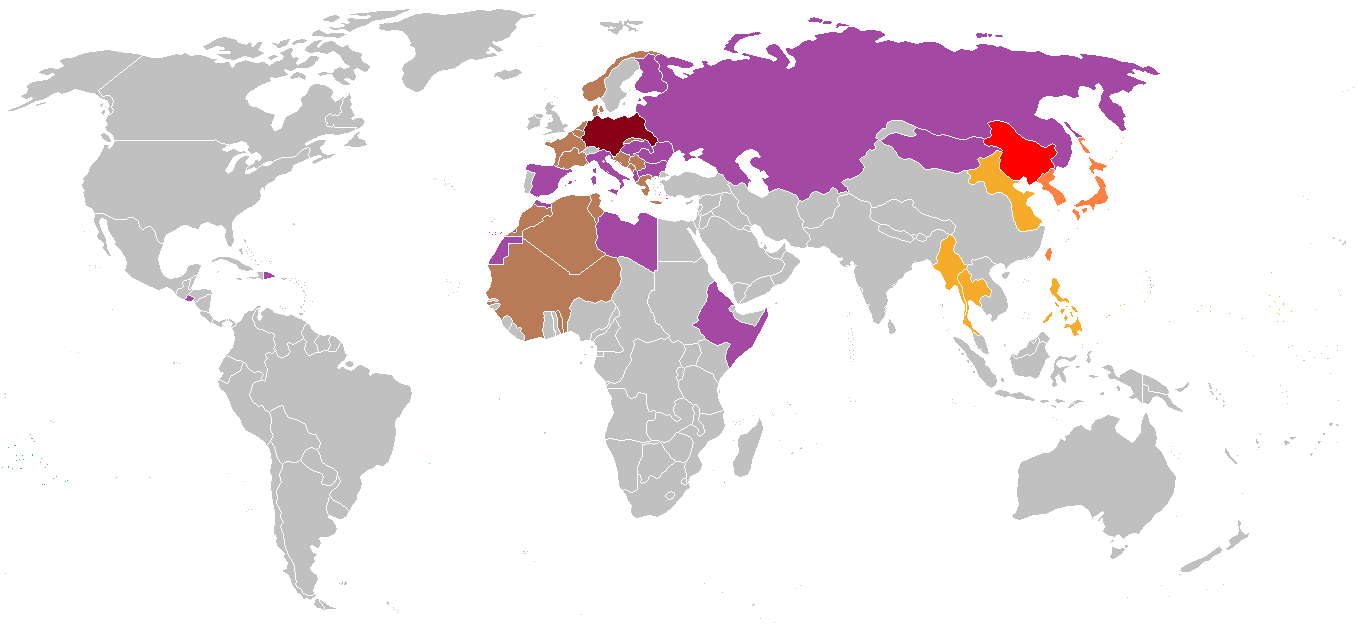
Foreign recognition of Manchukuo represented by states in colors other than gray Manchukuo Japan Japanese-influenced satellite governments Nazi Germany German-occupied areas, or areas under German-influenced satellite governments Other countries recognizing Manchukuo

The foreign relations of Manchukuo were the international relations of Manchukuo, a Japanese puppet state in China that existed from 1932 to 1945. After its founding on 1 March 1932, Manchukuo was initially recognized by Japan and El Salvador. In January 1933, the United States notified the world not to recognize Manchukuo. In February 1933, the League of Nations passed a resolution affirming China's sovereignty over Northeast China and denying the legitimacy of Manchukuo. In 1934, the United Kingdom stated that it would never recognize Manchukuo. With the establishment of the Axis powers and Manchukuo's accession to the Anti-Comintern Pact, Manchukuo was gradually recognized by its member states. By 1943, Manchukuo had been recognized by 22 countries.

== History ==
On 1 March 1932, following the Japanese invasion of Manchuria that followed the Japanese-staged Mukden incident, the Northeast Supreme Administrative Council issued the Declaration of National Founding and formally established Manchukuo, with its capital in Changchun (later renamed Xinjing). Its territory included the entire present-day Liaoning, Jilin and Heilongjiang provinces, as well as eastern Inner Mongolia and Chengde, Hebei. Subsequently, Xie Jieshi, the Minister of Foreign Affairs of Manchukuo, sent a notice to 17 countries including Japan, the United States, the United Kingdom, France, Germany, Italy and the Soviet Union, hoping to establish diplomatic relations.

The League of Nations dispatched the Lytton Commission to investigate the situation in December of that year. The pretext for the Japanese invasion was an alleged bombing by Chinese soldiers of a railway controlled by Japan at Liutiaogou in Manchuria, despite widespread knowledge that the Japanese army had orchestrated it. This event, referred to as the 'Manchurian Incident,' resulted in the establishment of the state of Manchukuo under Japanese control. While there was much doubt over the truth of the Incident, including from the members of the Lytton Commission, it was not until after the Tokyo War Crimes Trials that documents revealed that the Manchurian Incident was fabricated by Japanese military officers. Manchukuo was merely a puppet state of Japan; and Japan's actions constituted unjustified aggression.

In May 1932, at the "Polish Inn," members of a special commission of the League of Nations met with representatives of the Polish diaspora in Harbin. The Poles informed the diplomats that the Japanese actions were inconsistent with international law, and their testimony proved to be crucial in the matter, influencing the creation of the Lytton Report and the commission's decision not to recognize Manchukuo and condemn the Japanese aggression. In 1933, Poland, along with other League of Nations member states, officially condemned Japan's actions in Manchuria, confirming that the region should be under Chinese sovereignty. Poland, wanting to maintain good relations with China and the League of Nations, refused to recognize Manchukuo, but at the same time tried to maintain the Polish consulate in Harbin, which existed long before the Japanese occupation, to help Poles who experienced repression from the Japanese and the local authorities of Manchukuo. After the Japanese invasion, the situation of Poles in Manchuria deteriorated rapidly. The Japanese-controlled local authorities confiscated Polish property and concessions, and also dismissed Poles from their jobs within the structures of the Chinese Eastern Railway, regarding it as a form of punishment for not recognizing Manchukuo. Kazimierz Grochowski, one of the wealthiest Poles in Harbin, was stripped of his assets and concessions by the Japanese occupiers, who told him they had done so because "Poland does not appreciate the importance of Manchukuo". A similar fate befell many other Poles living under Japanese occupation. This provided a convenient pretext for confiscating Polish interests in Harbin. The Polish Ministry of Foreign Affairs was powerless in this matter; meanwhile, the Polish consulate was deprived of the right to intervene in cases concerning the protection of Polish citizens, negotiations regarding the restoration of concessions or the payment of compensation were ignored, and the property rights of Poles were challenged. Moreover, on December 14, 1938, in the Warsaw Monitor, the official journal of the Republic of Poland, competent and authorized officials from the Polish Ministry of Foreign Affairs published information that the exchange of correspondence between Poland and "Manchukuo" did not constitute recognition of "Manchukuo" by Poland, but was a practical solution to a problem arising from the presence of many Poles in occupied Manchuria. Information conveyed to Alfred Poniński, Poland’s ambassador to Chongqing, also indicates that the Polish note concerned solely the resolution of the difficult situation facing the Polish consulate and Polish citizens in Harbin; it was neither ratified nor published by the Polish government in the Journal of Laws, as it did not constitute a international treaty, and its content included neither a declaration of state recognition nor provisions regarding the establishment of diplomatic relations. At the same time, the Republic of Poland and the Republic of China maintained uninterrupted official diplomatic relations, as well as other Polish-Chinese institutions.In 1941, the Japanese government finally decided to close the Polish consulate. This decision was hastened by Poland’s declaration of war on the Empire of Japan.

Great Britain and other countries were in a similar situation. D.G. Somerville asked the Foreign Secretary: "Have British consular representatives been appointed to the Government of Manchukuo and does he envisage full recognition of this regime?" J. Simson replied that "British consular representatives are still stationed, as they have been for many years, in Harbin, Mukden and Newchwang. During the last two and a half years they have maintained with the appropriate local authorities such relations as they consider essential to British interests. In these relations the question of recognition by His Majesty's Government of the existing regime in Manchuria has not been raised. As to the second part of the question, the situation is still governed by the resolution adopted by the Assembly of the League of Nations on February 24, 1933, in which the members of the League pledged themselves not to recognize the existing regime in Manchukuo". In turn, Captain Dower asked the Secretary of the Department of International Trade whether he would consider the possibility of appointing a Trade Commissioner, given that three British consular representatives were still stationed in Manchukuo, although the country was not officially recognised, so as not to miss any opportunity to maintain and develop trade relations until further developments. The British view was that "Manchukuo," while "de jure" belonging to China, was "de facto" dependent on Japan. In practice, this meant that British consulates in Manchuria operated under the supervision of two embassies, while in Tokyo, the British conducted important diplomatic talks with the government of the occupying power.

On 14 June 1932, the House of Representatives of Japan passed a resolution to recognize Manchukuo. On 6 September, the Cabinet of Japan also passed a resolution to recognize Manchukuo. On 23 September of the same year, the Soviet Union agreed that Manchukuo would send consular officials to cities such as Moscow and Novosibirsk. On 15 January 1933, the United States notified the world not to recognize Manchukuo. In February 1933, the League of Nations passed a resolution with 44 votes in favor, 1 abstention, and 1 vote against, officially endorsing the Lytton Report, affirming China's sovereignty over Northeast China and not recognizing the legitimacy of Manchukuo. Japan responded by withdrawing from the international organization. The Manchukuo case persuaded the United States to articulate the Stimson Doctrine, under which international recognition was withheld from changes in the international system created by the force of arms.

After the establishment of the Axis powers in 1937, Germany and Italy recognized Manchukuo. In 1939, Manchukuo joined the Anti-Comintern Pact, and its member states successively announced their recognition of Manchukuo.

== Diplomatic recognition ==
Diplomatic recognition of Manchukuo
| No. | Country | Date of recognition | Notes |
|---|---|---|---|
| 1 | Japan | 15 January 1932 | On 15 September 1932, Japan formally recognized Manchukuo, and the two sides signed the Japan-Manchukuo Protocol. On 24 November, Japan appointed Nobuyoshi Muto, commander of the Kwantung Army, as its ambassador to Manchukuo. |
| 2 | El Salvador | 19 May 1934 | On 19 May 1934, El Salvador informed the Japanese government and the Manchukuo ambassador to Japan that El Salvador had recognized Manchukuo since 3 March. At that time, it was ruled by the fascist General Martinez. |
| 3 | Dominican Republic | October 1937 | In October 1937, Dominican dictator General Rafael Trujillo greeted the Emperor of Manchukuo in a friendly manner. |
| 4 | Italy | 29 November 1937 | On 29 November 1937, Italy, an ally of Germany, formally recognized Manchukuo after joining the Anti-Comintern Pact signed by Japan and Germany. |
| 5 | Spain | 2 December 1937 | On 2 December 1937, Manchukuo's ambassador to Japan, Ruan Zhenduo, and the Spanish representative to Japan exchanged notes, establishing diplomatic relations between the two countries, which were members of the Anti-Comintern Treaty. |
| 6 | Germany | 20 February 1938 | On 20 February 1938, Nazi Germany recognized Manchukuo. On 12 May, Germany and Manchukuo signed a treaty of friendship in Berlin. |
| 7 | Slovakia | 1939 | Axis power, puppet regime, and a member of the Anti-Comintern Pact. In 1939, Slovakia recognized Manchukuo. |
| 8 | Hungary | 10 January 1939 | Axis power and a member of the Anti-Comintern Pact. On 10 January 1939, Hungary recognized Manchukuo. |
| 9 | France | 12 July 1940 | German puppet state |
| 10 | China (Wang Jingwei regime) | 30 November 1940 | Japanese puppet state, member of the Anti-Comintern Pact. On 30 November 1940, the Wang Jingwei regime and Manchukuo recognized each other and established diplomatic relations. |
| 11 | Romania | 1 December 1940 | Axis power and a member of the Anti-Comintern Pact. On 1 December 1940, Romania recognized Manchukuo. |
| 12 | Bulgaria | 14 May 1941 | Axis power and a member of the Anti-Comintern Pact. On 14 May 1941, Bulgaria recognized Manchukuo. |
| 13 | Soviet Union | 13 April 1941 | On 13 April 1941, the Soviet Union and Japan signed the Soviet–Japanese Neutrality Pact, which stated that "the Soviet Union respects the territorial integrity and inviolability of Manchukuo, and Japan guarantees to respect the territorial integrity and inviolability of Mongolia," thus formally recognizing Manchukuo. |
| 14 | Mongolia | | Soviet satellite state, socialist country |
| 15 | Finland | 17 July 1941 | Member state of the Anti-Comintern Treaty. On 17 July 1941, it recognized Manchukuo. |
| 16 | Croatia | 2 August 1941 | Axis power, puppet regime, and a member of the Anti-Comintern Treaty |
| 17 | Thailand | 5 August 1941 | Japan's ally and an Axis power. On 5 August 1941, Thailand recognized Manchukuo. |
| 18 | Denmark | 16 August 1941 | On 16 August 1941, the Danish puppet government recognized Manchukuo. |
| 19 | Mengjiang | | Japanese puppet state |
| 20 | Azad Hind | | Japanese puppet state |
| 21 | Burma | | Japanese puppet state |
| 22 | Philippines | 1943 | Japanese puppet state |

== Bilateral relations ==
=== Japan ===
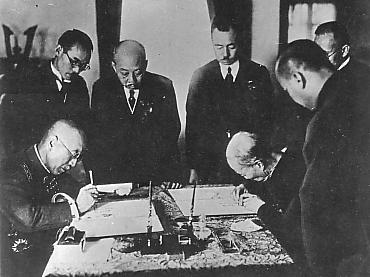
The signing and sealing of the Japan-Manchukuo Protocol dated 15 September 1932.

In March 1932, after the establishment of Manchukuo, Komai was appointed as the Director of the General Affairs Department of the State Council, wielding great power, and Japanese people held important positions in various agencies. On 14 June 1932, the Japanese House of Representatives passed a resolution recognizing Manchukuo. On 8 August, Japan appointed Nobuyoshi Mutō, commander of the Kwantung Army, as plenipotentiary ambassador to Manchukuo and governor of the Kwantung Army, whose power was equal to that of a governor-general. On 6 September, the Japanese cabinet passed a resolution recognizing Manchukuo. On 13 September, Nobuyoshi Mutō was appointed ambassador, and on 15 September, the Japan–Manchukuo Protocol was signed, and Japan officially recognized Manchukuo. On 24 November, Japan officially appointed Nobuyoshi Mutō as ambassador to Manchukuo.

On 12 February 1935, Manchukuo and Japan signed a tariff agreement. On 6 April of the same year, Emperor Puyi of Manchukuo visited Tokyo for the first time, and Emperor Hirohito of Japan greeted him at Tokyo Station. On 2 May, Emperor Puyi issued the "Edict of Return to the Capital and Instruction of the People", stating that he and the Emperor of Japan were "in one spirit", and that Manchukuo and Japan were "of one mind and one heart", forming an "inseparable" relationship. On 5 November 1937, Japan and Manchukuo concluded a treaty in which Japan abolished its extraterritorial rights on the territory of Manchukuo. All jurisdiction over the South Manchuria Railway Zone, which had previously been under Japanese control according to the treaty between Japan and the Qing government, was transferred to the government of Manchukuo.

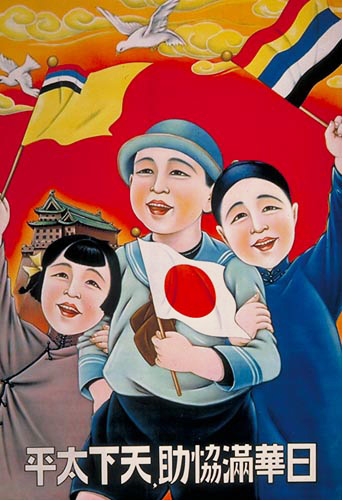
Propaganda posters proclaiming "Japan, China, and Manchuria assisting in world peace."

On 26 June 1940, Puyi made his second visit to Tokyo. The main purpose of this visit was to welcome the Japanese goddess Amaterasu back to Manchukuo for worship. On 15 July of the same year, Puyi issued the "Edict on the Establishment of the State", declaring that the establishment of Manchukuo, like that of Japan, originated from "Amaterasu", and worshipped "Amaterasu" as the "founding deity" of Manchukuo. On 1 March 1942, Puyi issued the "Edict on the Tenth Anniversary of the Founding of Manchukuo". From then on, Manchukuo changed its name for Japan from "friendly nation" and "ally" to "close nation", that is, it regarded Japan as its parent country. On 1 April 1943, Japanese Prime Minister Hideki Tojo visited Manchukuo.

=== Germany ===
Germany began to only conduct trade relations with Manchukuo and did not recognize any political implications. On 21 June 1933, the former German consul in Harbin, G. Pauli, told a reporter from the Harbin Times that Germany was paying close attention to the "new country" of Manchukuo and was willing to develop trade relations with it, which aroused the concern of the Chinese government. In response, the German Foreign Ministry sent a note to the Chinese side on 3 March stating that "Germany's position of not recognizing Manchukuo has not changed in any way." On 30 April 1936, the German Foreign Exchange Bureau and the Manchukuo government signed the "German–Manchukuo Trade Agreement" in Tokyo, Japan. In March 1937, Germany officially sent a trade commissioner, Knorr, to Manchukuo. In response to the negotiations of the Nationalist government, the German side stated that "this move is entirely for the purpose of fulfilling the barter agreement, has no political significance, and does not mean recognition of Manchukuo; moreover, Knorr does not have the status of a diplomat and does not have any contact with the Manchukuo government."

On 29 November 1937, Italy was the first to recognize Manchukuo after joining the Anti-Comintern Pact signed by Japan and Germany. In February 1938, German leader Adolf Hitler announced in a speech to the Reichstag that he would recognize Manchukuo. On 12 May, Germany and Manchukuo signed a treaty of amity in Berlin. Lü Yiwen was appointed as the Manchukuo ambassador to Germany, and went to Germany with his secretary Wang Tifu and others to take up their posts. On 11 April 1945, Manchukuo suspended diplomatic relations with Germany.

=== China ===
In order to support the establishment of Manchukuo, Japan planned the January 28 incident in Shanghai from 28 January to 3 March 1932. After the incident, the 19th Route Army rose up to resist, and the Nanjing National Government announced the temporary relocation of its capital to Luoyang. After the establishment of Manchukuo on 1 March 1932, the Japanese army declared a ceasefire on 3 March On 24 March 1932, China and Japan negotiated in Shanghai and signed the "Shanghai Armistice Agreement" on 5 May and transferred the 19th Route Army to Fujian to suppress the Communists. On 15 April 1932, the Provisional Central Government of the Chinese Soviet Republic led by the Chinese Communist Party issued a "Declaration of War against Japan", proposing the idea of "driving Japanese imperialism out of China by national revolutionary war". In January 1933, the Battle of Shanhaiguan in the Great Wall Campaign broke out, and Zhang Xueliang retreated to the interior of the pass. In March of the same year, the Japanese Kwantung Army captured Rehe and incorporated it into Manchukuo, and then took the initiative to propose a ceasefire negotiation with the National Government. On 31 May, the National Government and the Japanese army signed the Tanggu Agreement, tacitly acknowledging the existence of Manchukuo. After 1935, China and Manchukuo established postal, railway, air and trade relations.

On 30 March 1940, with the support of the Imperial Japanese Army China Expeditionary Army, Wang Jingwei and other Kuomintang members who had defected to Japan established the "Reorganized National Government" in Nanjing, which rivaled the Chongqing National Government at the time. On 10 December 1940, Wang Jingwei sent a special envoy, Xu Liang, the Minister of Foreign Affairs, to Xinjing, the capital of Manchukuo, to present his credentials to Puyi and begin diplomatic relations. In January and August 1941, Manchukuo and the Wang Jingwei government exchanged ambassadors. The two ambassadors of Manchukuo to the Republic of China (Wang Jingwei government) were Lü Ronghuan and Li Shaogeng. In the spring of 1942, Wang Jingwei visited Manchukuo and said in a speech: "We were compatriots in the past, we are compatriots today, and we will be compatriots in the future."

It is commonly believed that the Holy See established diplomatic relations with Manchukuo in 1934, but the Holy See never did so. This belief is partly due to the erroneous reference in Bernardo Bertolucci's 1987 film The Last Emperor that the Holy See diplomatically recognized Manchukuo. Bishop Auguste Ernest Pierre Gaspais was appointed as "representative ad tempus of the Holy See and of the Catholic missions of Manchukuo to the government of Manchukuo" by the Congregation De Propaganda Fide (a purely religious body responsible for missions) and not by the Secretariat of State responsible for diplomatic relations with states. In the 1940s the Vatican established full diplomatic relations with Japan, but it resisted Japanese and Italian pressure to recognize Manchukuo and the Nanking regime.

In November 1942, Zheng Yu was appointed Minister Plenipotentiary of Manchukuo to Thailand, and was awarded the Order of the Pillar of State, Second Class, during his tenure. In August 1944, Zheng Yu was transferred from Thailand.

The Soviet Union extended de facto recognition on 23 March 1935, but explicitly noted that this did not mean de jure recognition. The border dispute between Manchukuo and the Mongolian People's Republic has led to the Battles of Khalkhin Gol between the Japanese Kwantung Army and the Soviet Red Army in 1939. After Japan's defeat, it shelved the "Northern Advance" plan and instead implemented the "Southern Advance" plan. However, upon signing the Soviet–Japanese Neutrality Pact on 13 April 1941, the Soviet Union recognized Manchukuo de jure in exchange for Japan recognizing the integrity of neighboring Mongolia. The USSR did maintain five consulates-general in Manchukuo initially, although in 1936–37 these were reduced to just two: one in Harbin and another in Manzhouli. Manchukuo opened consulates in Blagoveshchensk (September 1932) and in Chita (February 1933).

In 1942, Japan and the United States conducted informal diplomatic negotiations and formed a Japan-U.S. understanding, hoping that the U.S. government would recognize Manchukuo. In June thereafter, the U.S. proposed to agree to conduct friendly negotiations with Japan on the Manchukuo issue, but the two sides ultimately did not reach an agreement.
