= Lü Ronghuan =

Chinese politician (1890–1946)

Lu Ronghuan 呂榮寰
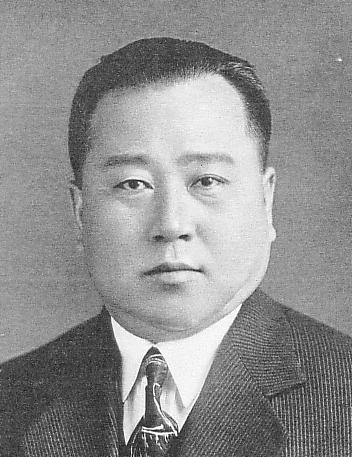
- Lu Ronghuan
- Born: 1890; Fushun, Liaoning Province, Qing Empire
- Died: 1946 (aged 55–56); Siberia, Soviet Union
- Citizenship: Manchukuo
- Education: Jiangsu University
- Occupation: Cabinet Minister of Empire of Manchukuo

Lu Ronghuan (simplified Chinese: 吕荣寰; traditional Chinese: 呂榮寰; pinyin: Lǚ Rónghuán; Hepburn: Ryo Eikan; 1890–1946), was a politician in the early Republic of China who subsequently served in a number of Cabinet posts of the Empire of Manchukuo.

== Biography ==
A native of Fushun Liaoning Province, Lü studied law at the Jiangsu Provincial University, returning to Shenyang in Manchuria to establish a legal office. In subsequently served in local government, becoming vice-chairman of the Fengtian Provincial Assembly and serving as a director on the Chinese Eastern Railway.

In 1923, Lü was commissioned by the Fengtian clique warlord, Zhang Zuolin as a special envoy to Moscow, where he negotiated a treaty between Manchuria and the Soviet Union. He was appointed governor of the Chinese Eastern Railway in 1928, but lost his position after the death of Zhang Zuolin and the military defeat of his son Zhang Xueliang.

After the Mukden Incident of 1931, Lü was recruited by Japanese spymaster Colonel Kenji Doihara to serve on the Self-Government Guiding Board, to determine the future structure of the new State of Manchukuo. In August 1932, he served as chairman of the Harbin city assembly, succeeding Bao Guancheng.

From July 1933 to May 1935, Lü was asked to serve as Governor of Harbin Special Municipality. Also from November 1934 to May 1935, he was concurrently Governor of Binjiang Province. In March 1935, Lü accepted the cabinet-level post of Minister of Civil Affairs of the Empire of Manchukuo, which he held to May 1937. He then served as Minister of Industry from May 1937 to May 1940 and Minister of Public Welfare from May 1940 to January 1941. In January 1941, he was sent as ambassador to the Reorganized National Government of China, remaining in Nanjing until 1944. After his return to Xinjing, he served with the Foreign Ministry as a special envoy, and retired from public life in 1945.

Following the Soviet invasion of Manchuria, Lü attempted to organize a civil defense committee to maintain public order, but was captured by Soviet Red Army and held in custody in Siberia. He died while incarcerated in Siberia of illness at the age of 57.

Positions in Manchukuo
Preceded by Zang Shiyi	Minister of Civil Affairs; 1935–1937	Succeeded by Sun Qichang
Preceded by Ding Jianxiu	Minister of Industry; 1937–1940	Succeeded by Yu Jingyuan
Preceded by Sun Qichang	Minister of Public Welfare; 1940–1941	Succeeded by Gu Ciheng
New post	Ambassador to the Republic of China; 1941–1944	Succeeded by Li Shaogeng
