= Zhang Yanqing (politician, born 1898) =

Zhang Yanqing 張燕卿
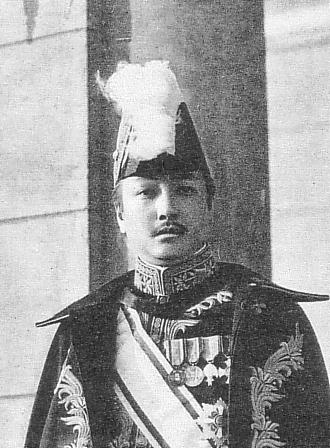
- Zhang Yanqing

Foreign Minister of Manchukuo
- In office May 1935 – May 1937
- Monarch: Puyi
- Preceded by: Xie Jieshi
- Succeeded by: Zhang Jinghui

Industry Minister of Manchukuo
- In office March 1932 – May 1935
- Monarch: Puyi
- Preceded by: position established
- Succeeded by: Ding Jianxiu

Personal details
- Born: 1898 Nanpi County, Hebei, Qing China
- Died: 1969 (aged 70–71) Tokyo, Japan
- Citizenship: Manchukuo (1932–1945)
- Relations: Zhang Renli (brother)
- Parent: Zhang Zhidong (father)
- Education: Gakushūin
- Awards: Order of the Auspicious Clouds (1st Class) 勲一位景雲章

Zhang Yanqing (simplified Chinese: 张燕卿; traditional Chinese: 張燕卿; pinyin: Zhāng Yànqīng; Wade–Giles: Chang Yen-ch'ing; Hepburn: Chō Enkei; 1898–1969) was a politician in the early Republic of China who subsequently collaborated with the Japanese and became the Foreign Minister of Manchukuo, Japan's puppet state. His father Zhang Zhidong was an important official in the later days of the Qing Empire, while his brother Zhang Renli was an official in the Reorganized National Government of China, another Japan's puppet state, making the two brothers as Japanese collaborators.

== Biography ==
Zhang studied foreign languages at Qingdao and went to Japan to study at the Gakushuin Peer's School in 1920. After his return to China in 1922, Zhang was appointed mayor of Wafangdian in Liaoning Province, and in 1924 was promoted to governor of Zhengding County in Hebei Province, and in 1925 was again promoted to governor of Tianjin under the Beiyang Government. In 1926, Tianjin was elevated to the status of a special province, and Zhang added the post of Chief of Police of Hebei Province to his list of positions. The following year, he also became a councilor to the Transportation Ministry and Vice Chairman of the Defense Council of Kirin Province in Manchuria. In 1931, he moved to Changchun where he chaired the Economic Development Department of the government of Kirin Province.

Following the Mukden Incident in September 1931 and, Zhang assisted Xi Qia in issuing a proclamation declaring Kirin Province to be independent of the Republic of China, and assisted the Imperial Japanese Army achieve a bloodless occupation of Kirin City. After the proclamation of the State of Manchukuo he participated in the Manchukuo Senate, speaking out strongly in favor of a monarchy, and thus opposing proposals by Zang Shiyi that Manchukuo become a republic. In March 1932, he accepted the cabinet-level post of Industry Minister of the Empire of Manchukuo. He became one of the directors of the Concordia Association in July 1932. In May 1935, he replaced Xie Jieshi as Foreign Minister, a post which he held until May 1937.

Following the collapse of Manchukuo, Zhang fled to Japan with the help of some associates of Mitsuru Toyama. In 1965, he served Secretary of Chamber of Industry & Commerce, East Asia(亜東工商協会). He died in Tokyo, Japan in 1969 at the age of 71.
