= Jieshi =

Jieshi may refer to:

- Jieshi, Guangdong (碣石镇), town in Lufeng, Guangdong, China
- Jieshi, Shandong (界石镇), China
- Chiang Kai-shek (1887–1975), or Jiang Jieshi (蔣介石), Chinese political and military leader
- Xie Jieshi (1878–1946), Taiwanese politician

== See also ==
- Jieshi (given name), East Asian name
