= Bao Guancheng =

Chinese diplomat

Bao Guancheng 鮑観澄
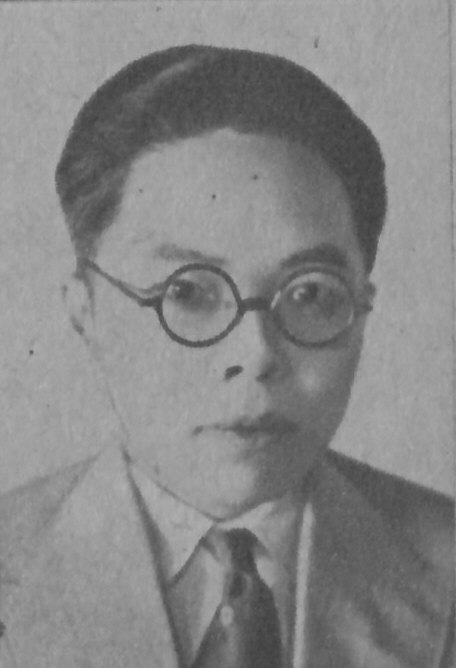
- Bao in 1932
- Born: 1898; Zhenjiang Jiangsu Province, Empire of China
- Died: 1975 (aged 76–77); Hong Kong
- Citizenship: Manchukuo
- Occupation: Manchukuo ambassador to Japan

Bao Guancheng (simplified Chinese: 鮑観澄; traditional Chinese: 鲍观澄; pinyin: Bào Guānchéng; Wade–Giles: Pao Kuan-ch'eng; Hepburn: Hō Kanchō; 1898–1975) was a Manchukuo politician, who served as mayor of Harbin and ambassador to Japan.

== Career ==
Bao was born in Zhenjiang, Jiangsu. In his youth, he studied law at Beiyang University, then worked as a secretary at the National Bureau of Alcohol and Tobacco (全國烟酒事務署). He joined the Zhili clique, then switched to the Fengtian clique, but Zhang Zuolin had him arrested due to alleged corruption. However, he escaped punishment, and in 1927 went on to become head of the Shanghai Telephone Exchange (上海電話局). Afterwards he became the victim of a stabbing, stepped down from this position, and went north; around this time, he was believed to have become involved with Japanese agents.

On 28 January 1932, a few months after the Mukden Incident, he was appointed the mayor of Harbin. The major event of his mayorship was a 100-year flood in July: half a metre of water fell in twenty-seven days of continuous rain, bursting the dikes on the Songhua River and leaving hundreds of thousands of refugees in its wake. Bao headed up the local flood relief committee (哈爾濱水災善後復興委員會) in the aftermath. In response, a local wag Pei Xinyuan (裴馨園) published a newspaper column giving Harbin the new nickname "City of Abalone", a pun on Bao's surname (鮑) and an allusion to the oceans of water which covered the city. Pei soon after found himself unemployed. However, the following month, Lü Ronghuan was appointed to replace Bao as mayor.

Soon after the end of his mayorship, Bao was appointed Manchukuo's ambassador to Japan. In a speech given in Manchukuo before his departure for Tokyo in September 1932, he derided the League of Nations as a failure and called for the creation of an "Asiatic League of Nations" as an alternative. After the collapse of Manchukuo in 1945, he went into hiding in Tianjin and then his hometown Zhenjiang, and finally escaped into exile in British Hong Kong, where he would live until his death.
