= Yu Zhishan =

Military officer

Yu Zhishan 于芷山
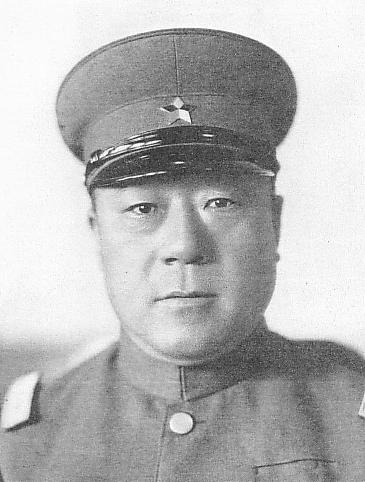

Minister of Defense of Manchukuo
- In office 21 May 1935 – 24 April 1939
- Preceded by: Zhang Jinghui
- Succeeded by: Yu Yucheng

Personal details
- Born: 1879 Liaoyang, Manchuria, Empire of China
- Died: May 1951 (aged 71–72) Fushun, China
- Citizenship: (Republic of China (1912–1949)) Republic of China; Manchukuo (Republic of China (1912–1949)) Republic of China; People's Republic of China
- Occupation: Cabinet Minister in Manchukuo government Privy Councillor

Military service
- Allegiance: (Republic of China (1912–1949)) Republic of China; Manchukuo

Yu Zhishan (Chinese: 于芷山; pinyin: Yú Zhǐshān; Hepburn: U Shizan; 1882 – May 1951), was a military officer under the Beiyang Government and the Fengtian clique, subsequently becoming a cabinet minister in Manchukuo.

== Biography ==
A native of Liaoning Province, in 1923, Yu served as commander of the Northwest Army’s 5th Combined Regiment stationed in Shandong Province. In 1924, he was reassigned to command the 8th Combined Regiment by order of the Manchurian warlord Zhang Zuolin. He was promoted to lieutenant general in June 1927. He returned to Shandong Province as commander of the 30th Army, assisting Chiang Kai-shek in defeating the forces of Yan Xishan in the Central Plains War. However, his alliance with the Kuomintang was short, as he was recalled to Manchuria to guard against the Northern Expedition. Following the death of Zhang Zuolin in the Huanggutun Incident in 1928, Manchuria fell back into chaos. Yu initially supported Zhang Xueliang, who appointed him commander in chief of the military in the 20 prefectures immediately surrounding Shenyang. Following the Mukden Incident of September 1931, Yu worked with Kan Chaoxi to declare Shenyang independent from the Republic of China, and subsequently cooperated with the Imperial Japanese Army on the Self-Government Guiding Board in the establishment of the state of Manchukuo.

In March 1932, Yu was appointed chief of police for Fentian Province in Manchukuo. From July, 1934, he was appointed commander-in-chief of the First Army of the Manchukuo Imperial Army, and from May of the same year, was appointed Army Minister in the Manchukuo Cabinet. In July 1937, the Army Ministry was renamed the Ministry of Public Security, and took over control of all police activities. Yu remained a cabinet minister until April 1939, at which time he was made a member of the Privy Council.

Following the collapse of Manchukuo, he fled to Beijing, where he lived under an assumed name until some point after the establishment of the People’s Republic of China in October 1949. He died in prison at the Fushun War Criminals Management Centre in May 1951 at the age of 72.
