= Ruan Zhenduo =

Chinese collaborator with Japan

Ruan Zhenduo 阮振鐸
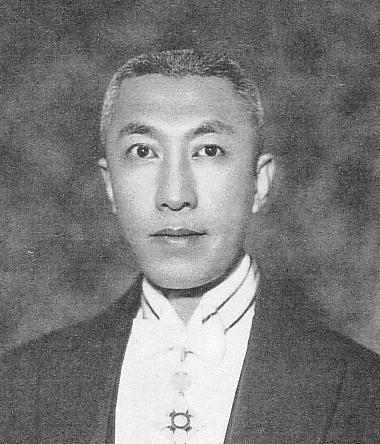
- Ruan Zhendou

Foreign Minister of Manchukuo
- In office April 1944 – August 1945
- Monarch: Puyi
- Preceded by: Li Shaogeng
- Succeeded by: Office abolished

Personal details
- Born: 1893 Tieling Liaoning Province, Qing China
- Died: 1973 Changchun, China
- Citizenship: Manchukuo
- Education: Manchurian Medical College; Kyoto Imperial University

Ruan Zhenduo (simplified Chinese: 阮振铎; traditional Chinese: 阮振鐸; pinyin: Ruǎn Zhènduó; Wade–Giles: Juan Chen-to; Hepburn: Gen Shintaku; 1893–1973), was a politician in the early Republic of China who subsequently served in a number of Cabinet-level positions in the Empire of Manchukuo.

== Biography ==
A native of Tieling, Liaoning Province, Ruan studied medicine at the Manchurian Medical College in 1913. In 1919, he went to Japan to study at the Kyoto Imperial University and graduated with a doctorate in medicine.

After his return to China in 1923, Ruan was appointed chairman of the Fentian State Medical Board, and a professor of medicine at the Northeastern University (Shenyang, China). He was also asked by the Fengtian Clique to serve as its chief army medical officer. He also held the posts of chairman of the Changchun and Jilin State Medical Boards by 1929.

In April 1932, under the new State of Manchukuo Ruan was asked to serve as Chief Secretary for Fengtian Province. He assisted Yu Jingyuan in establishing the Manchukuo Youth League and was one of the founding members of the Concordia Association. From November 1932, he served on the General Affairs State Council as Director of the Construction Bureau. In May 1935, Ruan accepted the cabinet-level post of Minister of Education of the Empire of Manchukuo, which he held to July 1937. From December 1940 to September 1942, he served as Minister of Transportation and from September 1942 to April 1944 as Minister of Finance. From April 1944 to August 1945, he served as Foreign Minister.

Following the Soviet invasion of Manchuria, Ruan was captured by Soviet Red Army and initially held in custody in Siberia, but was extradited to the People's Republic of China on July 31, 1950, where was incarcerated at the Fushun War Criminals Management Centre. He was housed with former Emperor Puyi, and helped the former emperor write his autobiography: The First Half of My Life; From Emperor to Citizen: The Autobiography of Aisin-Gioro Pu Yi. He was released by a special pardon in 1962 and found employment at the Changchun Medical Library as a librarian. He died in 1973 at the age of 81.
