= Zhang Jinghui =

Chinese general and politician

- 張景惠
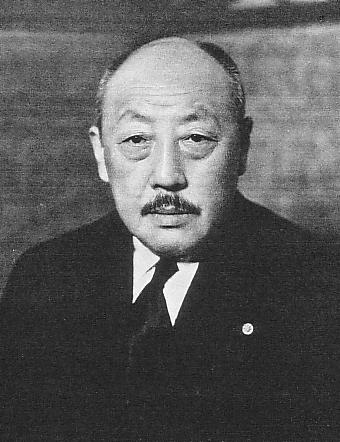

Prime Minister of Manchukuo
- In office 21 May 1935 – 20 August 1945
- Monarch: Puyi
- Preceded by: Zheng Xiaoxu
- Succeeded by: Office abolished

Foreign Minister of Manchukuo
- In office May 1937 – July 1937
- Preceded by: Zhang Yanqing
- Succeeded by: Office abolished

Minister of Defense of Manchukuo
- In office 7 April 1932 – 20 May 1935
- Preceded by: Ma Zhanshan
- Succeeded by: Yu Zhishan

Minister of War of the Republic of China
- In office May 1926 – June 1927
- Preceded by: Jia Deyao
- Succeeded by: He Fenglin

Personal details
- Born: 21 June 1871 Tai'an, Liaoning, China
- Died: 11 January 1959 (aged 87) Fushun, Liaoning, China
- Party: Concordia Association

Military service
- Allegiance: Qing dynasty Republic of China; Manchukuo
- Rank: General
- Battles/wars: First Sino-Japanese War; Russo-Japanese War

Zhang Jinghui (traditional Chinese: 張景惠; simplified Chinese: 张景惠; pinyin: Zhāng Jǐnghuì; Wade–Giles: Chang^{¹} Ching^{³}-hui^{⁴}; Hepburn: Chō Keikei; 21 June 1871 – 11 January 1959) was a Chinese general and politician of the Fengtian clique who served as Prime Minister of Manchukuo from 1935 to 1945. A sworn brother of the Manchurian warlord Zhang Zuolin, he was minister of the army in the Beiyang government before cooperating with the Japanese after the Mukden Incident of 1931. After the fall of Manchukuo, he was held by the Soviet Union and then by the People's Republic of China, and he died in custody at Fushun.

== Early life ==
Zhang was born on 21 June 1871 in Tai'an, in what is now Liaoning. He made his living selling tofu before taking up arms, and the Japanese encyclopedia Nipponica describes him as a former bandit. He led a local militia at Bajiaotai in Tai'an, but he later handed its leadership to Zhang Zuolin and became his deputy, with the backing of the local gentry and merchants. According to the Japanese historian Nishimura Shigeo, Zhang Zuolin's militia acted together with neighbouring leaders such as Zhang Jinghui, Tang Yulin and Zhang Zuoxiang during the Boxer Rebellion and the Russian occupation of Manchuria. In 1907, he became one of Zhang Zuolin's eight sworn brothers.

== Warlord era ==
By 1909, Zhang was a battalion commander under Zhang Zuolin, and after the reorganisation of 1912 he commanded a regiment of the 27th Division. For much of this period, he was regarded as the second man of the Fengtian clique. Around 1917, Zhang Zuolin gave him command of the 53rd Brigade after the defection of Tang Yulin, and he was later appointed military governor of Chahar and commander of the 16th Division.

In the First Zhili–Fengtian War of 1922, Zhang fought half-heartedly because of his earlier ties with the Zhili clique, and after Zhang Zuolin's defeat he went over to the Zhili side. He lost his military post that year. He was later reconciled with Zhang Zuolin, and from 1924 he held several posts in the Beiyang government in Beijing, including minister of the army. He later became administrator of the Harbin Special District, which covered Harbin and the zone of the Chinese Eastern Railway.

== Manchukuo ==
=== Founding ===
After the Mukden Incident of September 1931, Zhang cooperated with the Japanese. He set up an emergency committee for the Special District with the aim of separating northern Manchuria from China, and on 7 January 1932 he was inaugurated as governor of the district, which he had declared self-governing. In February 1932, he became chairman of a Japanese-sponsored committee for the northeastern provinces and head of a Japanese-sponsored government of Heilongjiang at Qiqihar. His refusal to leave Harbin for Qiqihar caused friction with the Kwantung Army. After Manchukuo was founded in March 1932, Zhang became chairman of its Privy Council, and in April 1932 he was appointed Minister of Defense.

=== Prime Minister ===
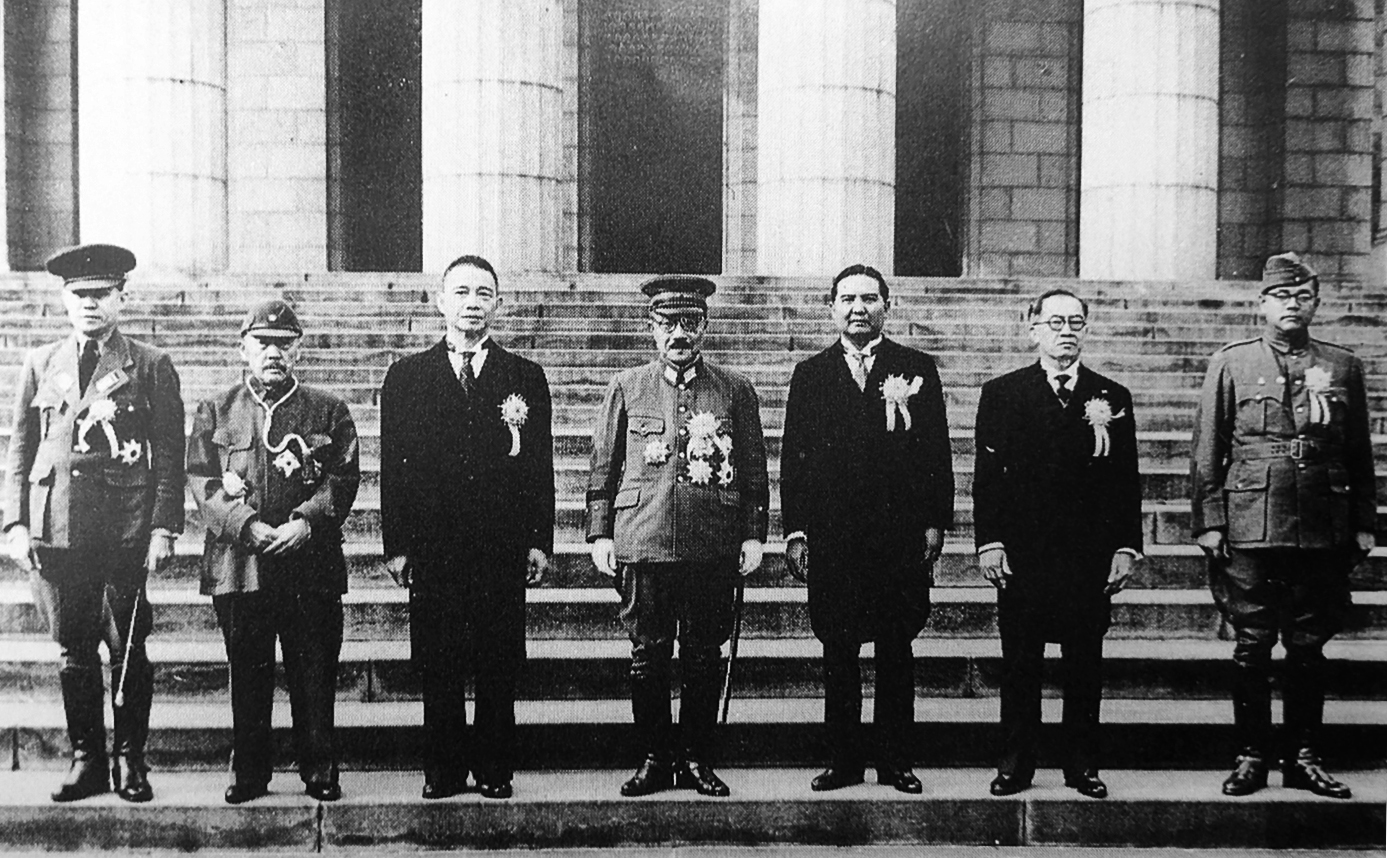
The Greater East Asia Conference in November 1943. Participants left to right: Ba Maw, Zhang Jinghui, Wang Jingwei, Hideki Tojo, Wan Waithayakon, José P. Laurel, and Subhas Chandra Bose

On 21 May 1935, Prime Minister Zheng Xiaoxu resigned suddenly, and Zhang formed a new cabinet in his place. According to the historian Yamamuro Shin'ichi, Zhang was chosen at the instigation of the Kwantung Army and over the objections of Emperor Puyi. Zheng had clashed with the Kwantung Army over his plans for a restoration of the Qing dynasty. As Prime Minister, Zhang chaired the State Council, but its most powerful body was the General Affairs Office, which controlled the personnel, budgets and supplies of the ministries. The historian Ronald Suleski has described him as upholding the Japanese occupation of Manchuria, while his son Zhang Mengshi secretly worked with the Communist underground.

In January 1943, Time reported, on the strength of reports from Chongqing, that Zhang had poisoned his family, shot his Japanese adviser and five officials, and then killed himself. The report was false, and in November 1943 Zhang represented Manchukuo at the Greater East Asia Conference in Tokyo. He remained Prime Minister until the collapse of Manchukuo in August 1945, as the second and last holder of the post.

== Later life and death ==
After the Soviet invasion of Manchuria, Zhang and his son Zhang Mengshi were held by the Soviet Union near Chita, where, according to the son's recollections, they were well fed and cared for. In 1950, Zhang was handed over to the People's Republic of China and held as a war criminal at Fushun. According to the historian Barak Kushner, he was not formally classed as a war criminal, although he was treated on a par with Puyi and was held with Japanese war criminals at the Fushun War Criminals Management Centre. He died at Fushun on 11 January 1959. His son Zhang Mengshi later published a memoir of the family's life in Manchukuo.

Government offices
| Office established | President of the Privy Council of Manchukuo; 1932–1935 | Succeeded by Zang Shiyi |
| Preceded by Ma Zhanshan | Minister of Defense of Manchukuo; 1932–1935 | Succeeded by Yu Zhishan |
| Preceded by Zheng Xiaoxu | Prime Minister of Manchukuo; 1935–1945 | Office abolished |
| Preceded by Zhang Yanqing | Foreign Minister of Manchukuo; 1937 | Office abolished |
