= Zang Shiyi =

Chinese general and governor (1884-1956)

Zang Shiyi 臧式毅
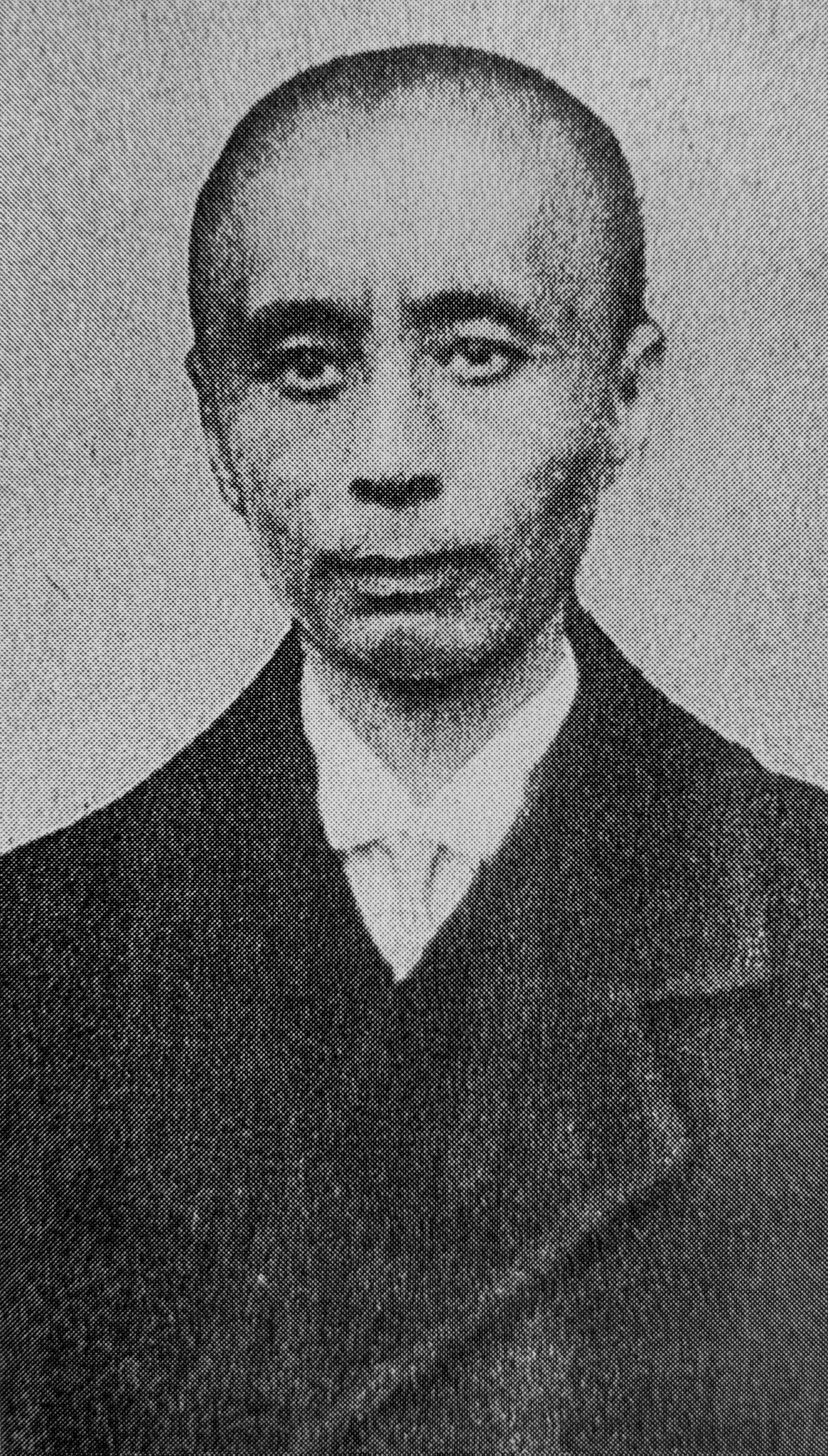
- Zang Shiyi in 1935

President of the Privy Council of Manchukuo
- In office May 1935 – August 1945
- Monarch: Puyi
- Preceded by: Zhang Jinghui
- Succeeded by: Office abolished

Minister of Civil Affairs of Manchukuo
- In office March 1932 – May 1935
- Prime Minister: Zheng Xiaoxu
- Preceded by: Office established
- Succeeded by: Lü Ronghuan

Personal details
- Born: October 1884 Shenyang, Manchuria, Qing Empire
- Died: November 13, 1956 (aged 72) Fushun, China
- Citizenship: Manchukuo
- Education: Tokyo Shinbu Gakko

Zang Shiyi (Chinese: 臧式毅; pinyin: Zāng Shìyì; Wade–Giles: Tsang Shih-i Hepburn: Zō Shikiki; October 1884 – November 13, 1956) was a Chinese general and Governor of Liaoning Province at the time of the invasion of Manchuria in 1932.

== Biography ==
Zang was born in Shenyang county of Liaoning Province in 1884. He traveled to Japan on a scholarship to the Tokyo Shinbu Gakko and subsequently graduated from 9th class of the Imperial Japanese Army Academy, with a specialty in the cavalry, in 1909. On his return to China, he joined the pro-republican forces in Nanjing during the Xinhai Revolution.

After the founding of the Republic of China in 1914 he became an instructor at the Baoding Military Academy, where he soon caught the attention of Admiral Shen Honglie, who appointed him to his staff. He rose to Chief of Staff for the Kuomintang forces in Jilin Province. He participated in the Zhili–Anhui War in 1920 and the First Zhili–Fengtian War of 1923. Together with Yan Yuting, he subsequently became Chief of Staff of the business administration section of the Kuomintang National Revolutionary Army headquarters in Nanjing.

After the death of Manchurian warlord Zhang Zuolin, Zang supported the Chinese Reunification Movement and was appointed governor of Liaoning Province in 1930.

After the Mukden Incident Zang initially refused to cooperate with the Imperial Japanese Army and was imprisoned. However, he later decided to defect and was re-appointed governor of Liaoning Province (renamed Fengtian Province) on 16 December 1931. He was part of the Northeast Supreme Administrative Council or "Self-Government Guiding Board that made plans for a new "independent" State of Manchuria to be established in February 1932.

When the government of the new state was formed in March, Zang became the first Minister of Civil Affairs. At the same time, he was re-appointed governor of Fengtian Province of Manchukuo, a position he retained until an administrative reorganization of the provinces of Manchukuo from four to ten provinces in October 1934. In March 1935 he was Emperor Puyi's first choice to replace Zheng Xiaoxu as Prime Minister of Manchukuo, but Zhang Jinghui was appointed instead at the insistence of the Japanese Kwantung Army leadership. Zang was instead appointed to replace Zhang the largely ceremonial role as President of the Privy Council of Manchukuo—a post which he held from 21 May 1935 until the collapse of Manchukuo in August 1945.

On 30 November 1940, Zang was sent as plentipotentiary to Nanjing in order to sign the Japan-Manchukuo-China joint declaration for Manchukuo, in which the Wang Jingwei regime recognised the country. It was part of the Basic Treaty by which Japan recognised the Reorganised National Government of China.

Following the Soviet invasion of Manchuria, he declared an emergency session of the Manchukuo Privy Council to promulgate the abdication of Emperor Puyi on 17 August 1945, effective 18 August, and attempted to open negotiations with the Soviet Union. However, the Manchukuo capital of Xinjing fell to the Red Army on 20 August 1945, and Zang was captured ten days later. He was initially held in custody in Siberia, but was extradited to the People's Republic of China in 1950, where he died of illness in captivity at the War Criminals Management Centre in Fushun, Liaoning, on 13 November 1956.
