= Jieshi (given name) =

Jieshi or Kai-shek (介石) is a Chinese masculine name. The Japanese version of the name is Kaiseki. Notable people with the name include:

- Chiang Kai-shek (Chinese: 蔣介石; 1887–1975), Chinese military commander and statesman
- Xie Jieshi (Chinese: 謝介石), minister of Manchukuo
- Matsumura Kaiseki (Japanese: 松村介石), Japanese religious leader
- Noro Kaiseki (Japanese: 松村介石; 1747–1828), Japanese artist
