= Zhang Jian =

Zhang Jian may refer to:

== Name ==
- Zhang Jian (businessman) (1853–1926), courtesy name Jizhi, Chinese entrepreneur, politician and educationist
- Zhang Jian (fencer) (born 1962), Chinese fencer
- Zhang Jian (football administrator) (born 1965/66), Chinese football administrator
- Zhang Jian (footballer) (born 1989), Chinese footballer
- Zhang Jian (judge) (born 1955), Chinese judge
- Zhang Jian (runner) (born 1976), Chinese middle distance runner
- Zhang Jian (sport shooter) (born 1985), Chinese sport shooter
- Zhang Jian (Tang noble) (594-653), Tang Dynasty noble
- Zhang Jian (lieutenant general) (born 1963), lieutenant general in the People's Liberation Army of China.
- Zhang Jian (politician, born 1956) (Chinese: 张健), a Chinese politician.

== Other ==
- Chinese research ship Zhang Jian
- Zhang Jianhui, Tang Dynasty general
- Zhang Jian-Jun (born 1955), Chinese artist
- Louis Ozawa Changchien (born 1975), American actor
