= Zhang Jian (judge) =

Chinese judge (born 1955)

- 张坚

President of Anhui Provincial People's Court
- In office January 2013 – August 2018
- Preceded by: Zhou Su
- Succeeded by: Dong Kaijun

Personal details
- Born: September 1955 (age 71) Qinyang, Henan, China
- Party: Chinese Communist Party (expelled; 1980–2020)
- Education: National Police University for Criminal Justice; Zhongnan University of Economics and Law; Huazhong University of Science and Technology

Chinese name
- Simplified Chinese: 张坚
- Traditional Chinese: 張堅
Transcriptions
Standard Mandarin
- Hanyu Pinyin: Zhāng Jiān

Zhang Jian (Chinese: 张坚; born September 1955) is a Chinese judge who served as president of Anhui Provincial People's Court from 2013 to 2018. He was investigated by China's top anti-graft agency in August 2019. He was a delegate to the 12th National People's Congress.

== Biography ==
Zhang was born in Qinyang, Henan, in September 1955. During the Cultural Revolution, he worked as a sent-down youth in Jingmen, Hubei. He graduated from National Police University for Criminal Justice, Zhongnan University of Economics and Law and Huazhong University of Science and Technology.

He entered the workforce in 1970, and joined the Chinese Communist Party in February 1980. In February 1978, he was assigned to the Miaozihu Police Station as a police, where he was promoted to deputy director in February 1983. He served as deputy director of the Correctional Division of Shayang Agricultural Authority in June 1988, and two years later promoted to the director position. In March 1994, he became the deputy director of Hubei Provincial Prison Administration, rising to director in July 1997. In July 2000, he was appointed deputy director of Hubei Provincial Justice Department, and rose to become director in January 2003. In February 2008, he became executive vice president of Hubei Provincial People's Court, a post he kept until January 2013, when he was transferred to the neighboring Anhui province and appointed president of Anhui Provincial People's Court, a position at vice-ministerial level.

=== Downfall ===
On 25 August 2019, he was put under investigation for alleged "serious violations of discipline and laws" by the Central Commission for Discipline Inspection (CCDI), the party's internal disciplinary body, and the National Supervisory Commission, the highest anti-corruption agency of China. On November 29, his qualification for delegates to the 13th AnhuiPeople's Congress was terminated.

On 22 January 2020, he was expelled from the Chinese Communist Party and dismissed from public office. On February 16, prosecutors signed an arrest order for him. In March, he was indicted on suspicion of accepting bribes. On November 26, he stood trial at the Intermediate People's Court of Xiamen on charges of taking bribes. He was charged with accepting money and property worth over 71.79 million yuan ($11.14 million) personally or through others. According to the indictment, he allegedly took advantage of his various positions in both Hubei and Anhui between 1995 and 2019 to seek benefits for helping others obtain projects, case trial, personnel transfer and civil execution.

On 14 September 2021, he received a sentence of 15 years in prison and fined of 5 million yuan ($0.776 million). The money and property that Zhang had received in the form of bribes, as well as any interest arising from them, will be turned over to the national treasury. Zhang said he agreed with the judgment and will not appeal to a higher court.

Legal offices
| Preceded by Zhou Su | President of Anhui Provincial People's Court; 2013–2018 | Succeeded by Dong Kaijun |
