= Ding Jianxiu =

Chinese politician (1886–1944)

Ding Jianxiu 丁鑑修
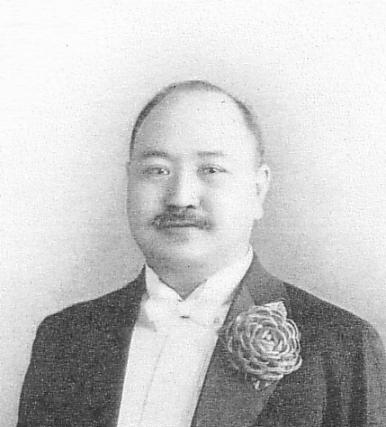
- Ding Jianxiu
- Born: 1886; Gaizhou, Liaoning, Qing dynasty
- Died: 1944 (aged 57–58); Xinjing, Manchukuo
- Citizenship: Manchukuo
- Education: Waseda University
- Occupation: Cabinet Minister of the Empire of Manchukuo

Ding Jianxiu (simplified Chinese: 丁鉴修; traditional Chinese: 丁鑑修; pinyin: Dīng Jiànxiū; Wade–Giles: Ting Chien-hsiu, Hepburn: Tei Kanshū, 1886–1944) was a politician in the early Republic of China who subsequently served in a number of Cabinet-level ministries of the Empire of Manchukuo.

== Biography ==
A native of Gaizhou Liaoning (near Yingkou), Ding was a graduate of the School of Economics of Waseda University in Tokyo, Japan.

On his return to China, he also studied law and human relations. Ding was hired as an instructor at numerous institutions of higher education in Mukden, including the Teacher's College, Military Academy, Vocational Academy and Police Academy. From 1913 he was a professor at the graduate school of languages at Mukden University. He subsequently served in local government, holding various posts in the Liaoning provincial government and serving also as a director for a Sino-Japanese joint-venture company to develop iron ore deposits.

After the death of Fengtian clique warlord Zhang Zuolin, Ding worked with Yuan Jinkai towards the independence of Manchuria from the Republic of China. Following the Mukden Incident in 1931, the Japanese Kwantung Army appointed him to the self-government committee for Fengtian Province.

Following the establishment of the State of Manchukuo, Ding served as a Director of the Transportation Department from March 1932-March 1934, and continuing in what was essentially the same duties as Minister of Transportation of the Empire of Manchukuo from March 1934-March 1935. From May 1935-May 1937 he served as Minister of Enterprises. In May 1937 he retired from public service. However, in May 1940 he was appointed to serve on the Privy Council, and helped organize the celebrations marking the 10th anniversary of the foundation of Manchukuo in 1941. In December 1942 he was appointed a member of the committee oversee the construction of the Manchukuo National Shrine. He died of illness in 1944 at the age of 59.
