= National Police University for Criminal Justice =

The National Police University for Criminal Justice
- 中央司法警官学院
- Type: National
- Established: 1956
- President: Wang Hengqin (王恒勤)
- Faculty: 506
- Location: Baoding City, Hebei, China
- Website: cicp.edu.cn

The National Police University for Criminal Justice (Chinese: 中央司法警官学院), previously the Central Institute for Correctional Police, is a public university in Baoding, Hebei, China. The university, founded in 1956, is currently the only tertiary institution affiliated to and funded by the Ministry of Justice.

The institution is regarded as "cradle of senior correctional police" in China. The university currently has 506 teachers and staff. Among them, 314 are formal instructors. There are 69 professors and 76 associate professors on the faculty. 180 have masters or doctors degrees, accounting for 57.3% of total faculty members. It consists of a number of experts and scholars, including 10 instructors, who receive special subsidies from the State Council.

== Academics ==
The university has 10 teaching units, including the School of Prison Studies, the School of Law, the Department of Correctional Education, the Department of Information Management, the Department of Police Management, the Department of Marxism–Leninism Teaching and Research, the Department of Basic Courses, the Department of Police Sports Teaching and Research, the Department of Postgraduate Education, and the School of Continuing Education, as well as the rule of law. There are 11 research institutions including the Government Research Center, the Criminal Reform Theory Research Center, the Drug Rehabilitation and Rehabilitation Research Center, and the Community Correction Research Center. The library has a collection of more than 950,000 volumes. It has the only prison drug rehabilitation literature information center and lawyer literature information center in the country. It has 16 modern experiments such as the Ministry of Justice Key Laboratory of Modern Correction Technology, the Drug Rehabilitation Technology Laboratory, and the Judicial Information Security Laboratory. More than 30 off-campus teaching and research practice bases have been selected and established by judicial and administrative organs across the country.

With the advantages of prison science and correctional education, the university has built a discipline system with mutual penetration and coordinated development of law, management, and engineering. The university's prison science has been established as a key discipline of the Ministry of Justice, correctional education has been approved as a key construction discipline of the Ministry of Justice, and criminal law has been approved as a key discipline in Hebei Province. The university currently offers 25 undergraduate majors and professional directions, including prison science, law, investigation (in-prison investigation), administrative management (police management), judicial police science, anti-drug science (drug rehabilitation), and data police technology.
