= Yuan Jinkai =

Yuan Jinkai 袁金鎧
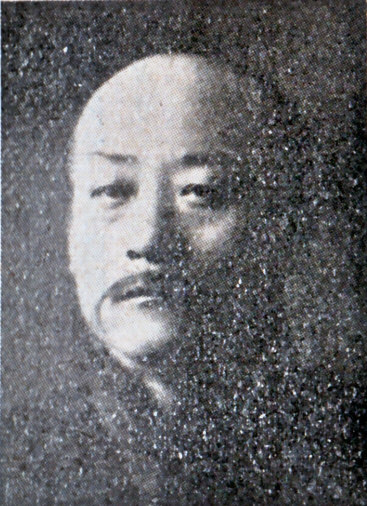
- Yuan Jinkai
- Born: 1870; Liaoyang, Liaoning, Qing dynasty, China
- Died: March 1947 (aged 76–77); Liaoyang, Andong, Republic of China
- Other names: Yuan Chin-kai
- Citizenship: Manchukuo

Yuan Jinkai (Chinese: 袁金鎧; pinyin: Yuán Jīnkǎi; Wade–Giles: Yüan Chin-k'ai; Hepburn: En Kingai; 1870 – March 1947), was a politician in the late Qing Empire, serving subsequently under the Beiyang Government and the Fengtian clique, subsequently becoming a senior official in the Empire of Manchukuo.

== Biography ==
A native of Liaoyang city, Yuan served as deputy commander of the local police under the late Qing dynasty. In October 1913, after the Xinhai Revolution, he was appointed deputy governor of Liaoning Province and in 1915 was selected to represent the province in the Upper House of the legislature of the Republic of China. However, after the death of Yuan Shikai, northern China fell back into chaos, and Yuan became a supporter of the Manchurian warlord Zhang Zuolin. In 1916, Yuan was appointed chief secretary to the Fentian Army. He subsequently served as chief secretary to Zhang's army in Heilongjiang Province, and was given a seat on the board of directors of the Chinese Eastern Railway. In 1930, he served as deputy director on the Control Yuan.

After the Mukden Incident in 1931, Yuan worked with Kan Chaoxi to declare Shenyang independent from the Republic of China, and subsequently cooperated with the Imperial Japanese Army on the Self-Government Guiding Board in the establishment of the state of Manchukuo. He was then appointed to the Privy Council of Manchukuo. He also served in local government and on various legal committees from 1932 to 1935, including the Constitutional Commission. He was appointed Lord Keeper of the Privy Seal in February 1935. Yuan retired in April 1944 after suffering from a stroke which left his limbs paralyzed.

Somehow overlooked during the Soviet invasion of Manchuria by the Soviet Red Army, and, subsequently, by the Chinese Communist Party, Yuan died in his hometown of Liaoyang in March 1947 at the age of 78.
