= Zheng Xiaoxu =

Chinese diplomat and politician (1860-1938)

- 鄭孝胥
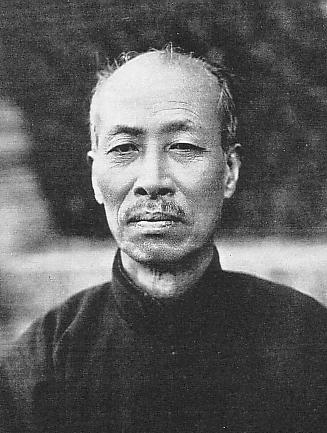

Prime Minister of Manchukuo
- In office 9 March 1932 – 21 May 1935
- Monarch: Puyi (after 1935)
- Chief Executive: Puyi (until 1935)
- Preceded by: Position established
- Succeeded by: Zhang Jinghui

Personal details
- Born: 2 May 1860 Suzhou, Jiangsu, Qing China
- Died: 28 March 1938 (aged 77) Xinjing, Manchukuo (now Changchun, Jilin, China)
- Party: Concordia Association

Zheng Xiaoxu (Cheng Hsiao-hsu; simplified Chinese: 郑孝胥; traditional Chinese: 鄭孝胥; pinyin: Zhèng Xiàoxū; Wade–Giles: Cheng^{⁴} Hsiao^{⁴}-hsu^{¹}; Hepburn: Tei Kōsho; 2 April 1860 – 28 March 1938) was a Chinese official, diplomat, poet and calligrapher who served as the first Prime Minister of Manchukuo from 1932 to 1935. A late Qing official who had served as a diplomat in Japan and on the staff of Zhang Zhidong, he remained loyal to the Qing after 1911 and became an adviser to the deposed emperor Puyi. He was also a leading poet of the Tongguang school and a calligrapher whose work was in great demand.

== Early life ==
Zheng was born in Suzhou in 1860 into a family from Minhou County in Fujian. From the age of four, he was taught the classics by his grand-uncle Zheng Shigong. In 1882, he placed first in the Fujian provincial imperial examination. He joined the secretariat of Li Hongzhang in 1885, and in 1890 he became a secretary in the Grand Secretariat.

== Diplomatic career in Japan ==
In 1891, Zheng went to Japan with Li Jingfang as an attaché and worked as a secretary at the Qing legation in Tokyo. He was later posted to Kobe and Osaka as consul, where he built ties with Japanese politicians and scholars. In Kobe, he helped to run the Chinese Guild Hall, whose new building had opened in January 1893, and he dealt with disputes between Chinese and Japanese residents. In 1893, he presented a pair of calligraphy scrolls to the Japanese sinologist Nagao Uzan, and they are now held by the Kyoto National Museum. He left Japan in 1894, after the outbreak of the First Sino-Japanese War.

== Late Qing service ==
On his return, Zheng joined the staff of Zhang Zhidong in Nanjing, where he supervised Zhang's Self-Strengthening Army and became a spokesman for Zhang's reform programme. In 1898, he served as a secretary of the Zongli Yamen and took part in the Hundred Days' Reform. Around 1901, he was director of the Jiangnan Arsenal in Shanghai. In 1902, he joined the staff of Cen Chunxuan, and the following year he took charge of frontier defence in Guangxi, where he led troops against bandits.

In 1906, Zheng left government service and settled in Shanghai, and in the same year he became president of the China Public School. He also founded the Preparatory Constitutional Association with Zhang Jian to promote constitutional government. In 1909, he moved into the Haicanglou, a house he had built on Nanyang Road in Shanghai, from which he took his art name Haicang. In 1911, he was appointed provincial administration commissioner of Hunan.

== Qing loyalist ==
After the fall of the Qing dynasty in 1911, Zheng refused to serve the Republic and lived in retirement in the Shanghai concessions. He did editorial work for the Commercial Press and became a central figure among the city's literati and Qing loyalists. The sale of his calligraphy brought him several thousand yuan a year.

From 1923, Zheng advised Puyi on the reform of the imperial household, and in January 1924 he left Shanghai for Beijing to serve the former emperor. After Puyi was expelled from the Forbidden City in the Beijing coup of 1924, Zheng and other loyalists worked with Japanese groups, including the Black Dragon Society, for a restoration of the dynasty. From 1925, he served as Puyi's lecturer at Tianjin. An American diplomatic list of 1932 described him as Puyi's tutor in calligraphy.

== Prime Minister of Manchukuo ==
After the Mukden Incident and the Japanese occupation of Manchuria, Zheng became the first Prime Minister of Manchukuo on 9 March 1932, and he also served as head of the State Council and Minister of Education. He drew on the Confucian idea of wangdao, or the "kingly way", to justify the new state. He hoped that Manchukuo would outdo the Republic and might one day reunite China under its rule. He also opposed the idea of a single ruling party and supported the Concordia Association in its place.

Zheng had little real power, and he clashed with the Kwantung Army over his plans for a Qing restoration. In July 1933, when the Kwantung Army commander Mutō Nobuyoshi told him that Manchukuo would become a monarchy, Zheng said that he hoped to see Puyi enthroned in Beijing, a remark that Puyi's interpreter Hayashi Kenjirō regarded as imprudent. On 21 May 1935, Zheng resigned suddenly, and Zhang Jinghui formed a new cabinet. According to Xu Yuji, he was dismissed after publicly criticising Japanese control of Manchukuo.

== Later life and death ==
After leaving office, Zheng lived in Xinjing, the capital of Manchukuo, until his death on 28 March 1938.

== Personal life ==
Zheng married Wu Zhongzhao, a daughter of Wu Zancheng, a director of the Fuzhou Navy Yard, who died on 10 February 1928. He also kept the Shanghai actress Jin Yuemei as a concubine. His younger brother was Zheng Xiaocheng.

== Legacy ==
Zheng is remembered chiefly for his collaboration with the Japanese, but he was also a leading poet of the Tongguang school of late Qing poetry. In his survey of the poets of the period, Wang Guoyuan ranked him second. His collected poems, the Haicanglou shiji, were republished by the Shanghai Classics Publishing House in 2003. His calligraphy is held by museums including the Kyoto National Museum and the Virginia Museum of Fine Arts.

Zheng kept a detailed diary for most of his adult life. It was published in five volumes by the Zhonghua Book Company in 1993, edited by Lao Zude for the Museum of Chinese History, and historians have drawn heavily on it.

Government offices
New title	Prime Minister of Manchukuo; 1932-1935	Succeeded by Zhang Jinghui
