= Sun Qichang =

Sun Qichang 孫其昌
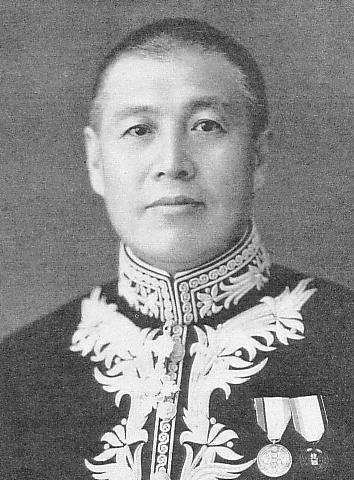
- Sun Qichang
- Born: 1885; Liaoyang, Liaoning, Qing dynasty, China
- Died: 1954 (aged 68–69); Beijing, People's Republic of China
- Citizenship: Manchukuo
- Education: University of Tsukuba

Sun Qichang (simplified Chinese: 孙其昌; traditional Chinese: 孫其昌; pinyin: Sūn Qíchāng; Hepburn: Son Kishō; 1885–1954), was a politician in the early Republic of China who subsequently served as a cabinet minister in the Empire of Manchukuo.

== Biography ==
A native of Liaoyang Liaoning Province, Sun studied at the Tokyo University of Education in Tokyo, Japan. After his return to China, he served as principal to the Mukden Commercial Higher School in Shenyang, and was subsequently secretary to the Provincial Army of Heilongjiang. In July 1920, he was appointed chairman of the Education Board of Heilongjiang Province. From July 1921, he received an appointment from the Beiyang Government as a diplomat to negotiate with foreign powers in Kirin Province. Following Manchurian warlord Zhang Xueliang’s rapprochement with the central government in late 1928, Sun was appointed a member of the Kirin Provincial Assembly, and was promoted to become director of the Construction Ministry of the same province the following year.

Following the Mukden Incident in 1931, Sun allied himself with Xi Qia and his efforts to form a new government for Kirin Province independent of the Republic of China. This was effected from 30 September 1931 and he accepted a position in the Finance Ministry of Kirin Province as Director of the Spirits and Tobacco State Monopoly.

In April 1932, under the new State of Manchukuo, Sun continued to serve in the Finance Ministry, but in June 1933 was appointed governor of Heilongjiang Province. The following year, with the creation of the new province of Longjiang, he was transferred to become governor of that province. In January 1935, Sun was appointed to the cabinet-level post of Minister of Finance of the Empire of Manchukuo, which he held only to May 1935. From May 1935 to May 1940, he served as Minister of Civil Affairs. Afterwards he was appointed to the Privy Council, but was relieved of his duties in September 1942 over disagreements with the government on economic policy.

Following the Soviet invasion of Manchuria, he went into hiding in Shenyang, and later in Beijing, but was discovered after the establishment of the People's Republic of China in February 1951. He was executed in Beijing in 1954.
