= State Council of Manchukuo =

State Council of Manchoukuo
- 滿洲國國務院 滿洲國國務院
- Imperial emblem of Manchukuo

Agency overview
- Formed: 9 March 1932; 94 years ago
- Dissolved: August 18, 1945
- Type: Highest political organ of Manchukuo
- Jurisdiction: Manchukuo
- Headquarters: State Council Building, Xinjing
- Agency executive: Zhang Jinghui, Prime Minister

State Council of Manchukuo

Chinese name
- Traditional Chinese: 滿洲國國務院
- Simplified Chinese: 滿洲國國務院
Transcriptions
Standard Mandarin
- Hanyu Pinyin: Mǎnzhōuguó Guówùyuàn
- Bopomofo: ㄇㄢˇ ㄓㄡ ㄍㄨㄛˊ ㄍㄨㄛˊ ㄨˋ ㄩㄢˋ
- Wade–Giles: Man^{3}-chou^{1}-kuo^{2} Kuo^{2}-wu^{4}-yüan^{4}

Japanese name
- Hiragana: まんしゅうこくこくむいん
- Kyūjitai: 滿洲國國務院
- Shinjitai: 満州国国務院
Transcriptions
- Revised Hepburn: Manshū-koku Kokumu-in
- Kunrei-shiki: Mansyû-koku Kokumu-in

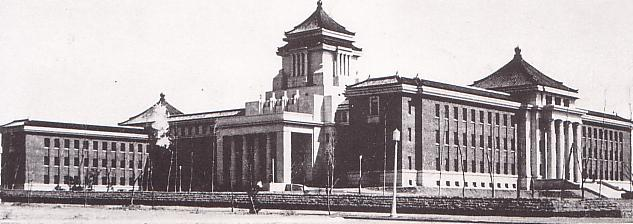
Manchukuo General Affairs State Council building

The State Council of Manchukuo was the official executive administrative branch of Manchukuo from 1934–1945.

== Background ==
Manchukuo was proclaimed a monarchy on 1 March 1934, with former Qing dynasty emperor Puyi assuming the Manchukuo throne under the reign name of Emperor Kang-de. An imperial rescript issued the same day, promulgated the organic law of the new state, establishing a Privy Council (参議府), a Legislative Council (立法院) and the State Council. The Privy Council was an appointive body consisting of Puyi's closest friends and confidants, and the Legislative Council was largely an honorary body without authority. The State Council was therefore the center of political power in Manchukuo.

== Composition ==
The State Council consisted of ten ministries forming a cabinet. The cabinet ministers were all Manchukuoans, of either ethnic Manchu or Han Chinese descent, while most of the vice-ministers in each ministry were Japanese, appointed by the Kwantung Army leadership. The State Council was supported by a General Affairs Board (総務庁) headed by a Japanese official.

The Council's initial composition was at the time of Prime Minister Zheng Xiaoxu included the following portfolios:

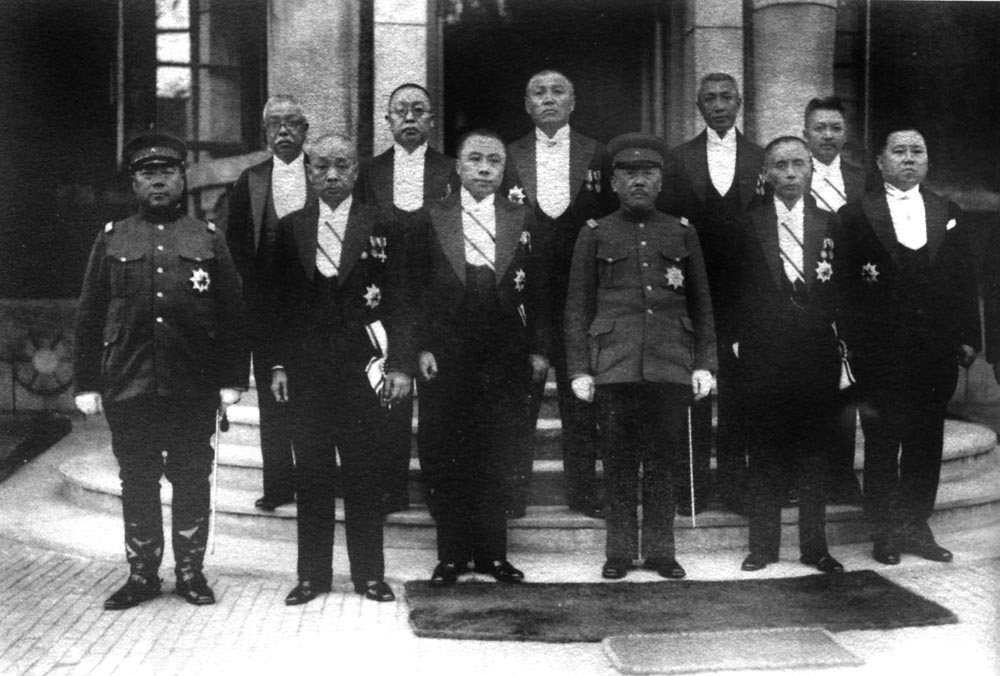
Manchukuo Cabinet Ministers

- Prime Minister
- Home Affairs
- Foreign Affairs
- Defense
- Finance
- Industry and Agriculture
- Transportation and Communications
- Justice
- Education
- Mongolian Affairs

== The State Council building ==
The State Council Building was an imposing five-story structure with two four-story wings built in downtown Xinjing in reinforced concrete with a portal frame construction with a pseudo-oriental roof with towers. The building was designed so that its main entrance faces west. The building is still in use today by the Jilin provincial government in the People's Republic of China. Each of the main cabinet-level ministries also had its own imposing building. Many of these structures are still in use in various capacities in modern China.
