= Li Shaogeng =

Chinese politician

Li Shaogeng 李紹庚
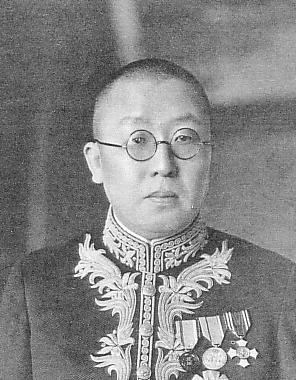
- Li Shaogeng

Minister of Foreign Affairs of Manchukuo
- In office September 1942 – April 1944
- Monarch: Puyi
- Preceded by: Wei Huangzhang
- Succeeded by: Ruan Zhenduo

Personal details
- Born: 1896 Liaoyang Liaoning Province, Empire of China
- Died: unknown unknown
- Citizenship: Manchukuo
- Education: Harbin Higher Commercial School

Li Shaogeng (simplified Chinese: 李绍庚; traditional Chinese: 李紹庚; pinyin: Lǐ Shàogēng; Hepburn: Ri Shōkō; b. 1896), was a politician in the early Republic of China who subsequently served in a number of cabinet posts of Manchukuo.

== Biography ==
A native of Liaoyang Liaoning Province, Li graduated from the Harbin Higher Commercial School. He subsequently served in local government, and various posts under Fengtian clique warlord, Zhang Zuolin. He was also sent as envoy from Manchuria to Vladivostok from March–September 1927. In 1931, he became a director of the Chinese Eastern Railway.

Following the establishment of Manchukuo, Li continued to work for the Chinese Eastern Railway, rising to the post of Chairman of the Board of Directors and President. In March 1935 he accepted the post of Minister of Transportation for Manchukuo – a post which he held to December 1942. From September 1942 to April 1944, Li also held the post of Foreign Minister of Manchukuo. In April 1945, Li was appointed as special envoy to the Wang Jingwei Government.

Following the Soviet invasion of Manchuria, Li went into hiding. His subsequent fate is unknown.
