= Xie Jieshi =

Taiwanese politician (1878–1946)

- 謝介石
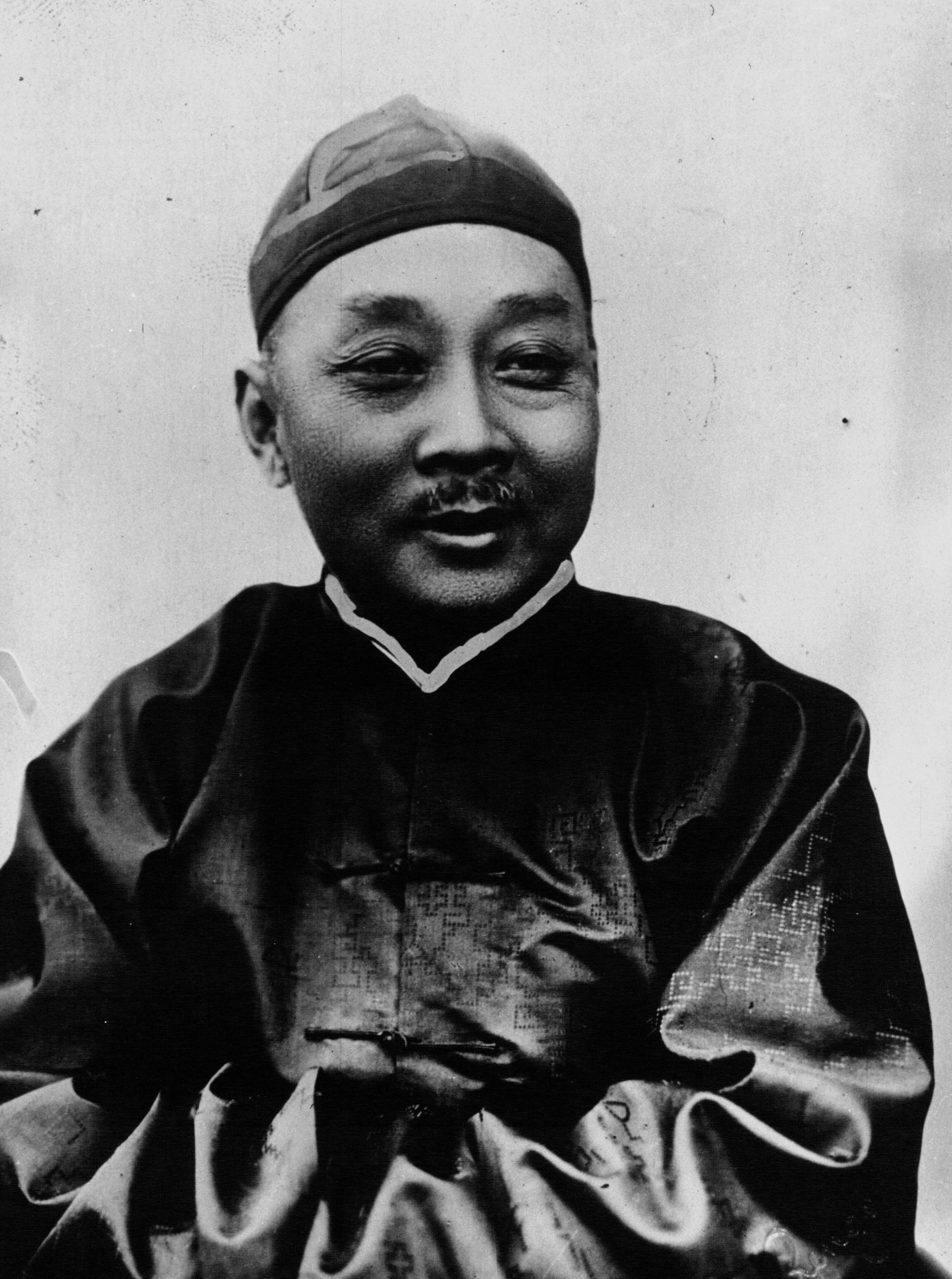
- Xie in 1932

Foreign Minister of Manchukuo
- In office 1932–1935
- Monarch: Puyi
- Preceded by: Office established
- Succeeded by: Zhang Yanqing

Personal details
- Born: 1878 Hsinchu, Qing Taiwan
- Died: 1954 (aged 75–76) Beijing, China
- Citizenship: Empire of Japan (1895–1916); Republic of China (1916–1949); Manchukuo (1932–1945); People's Republic of China (1949–1954)
- Party: Concordia Association
- Education: Meiji University

Xie Jieshi (also transliterated as Hsieh Kai-shek; Chinese: 謝介石; pinyin: Xiè Jièshí; Wade–Giles: Hsieh^{4} Chie^{4}-shih^{2}; Hepburn: Sha Kaiseki; 1878 – 1954) was a cabinet minister in the Japanese-dominated Manchukuo, who served as Minister of Foreign Affairs.

== Biography ==
Xie Jishi was born in Hsinchu, Taiwan under Qing rule, in 1878, to a family of immigrants from Fujian, and attended the Japanese-run Shinchiku Kokugo Denshujo, where he studied the Japanese language. He served as interpreter for Japanese Prime Minister Itō Hirobumi on his visit to Taiwan, by then under Japanese rule. Itō was so impressed with the young Xie that he recommended him for a scholarship to Meiji University in Tokyo, from which he graduated from the law school. During his time in Tokyo from 1904 to 1906, Xie also taught Taiwanese Hokkien at the Taiwan Association School.

From 1907 to 1908, Xie taught at the Jilin School of Foreign Languages in China. The school closed in 1909, and in that year, he became an advisor to Duanfang. After Duanfang was removed as governor of Zhili, Xie joined the staff of Songshou, the governor-general of Fujian and Zhejiang. Xie joined the teaching staff of Fujian Training School of Law in 1910, of which he was soon named headmaster. By 1913, Xie was secretary-general to General Zhang Xun in Tianjin. He renounced his Japanese citizenship for citizenship in the Republic of China in 1916. He participated in Zhang Xun's brief restoration to power of the dethroned Emperor Puyi in 1917, and was Assistant Officer for Foreign Affairs during the brief imperial government. After Puyi was again deposed, Xie remained a strong supporter for the restoration of the Qing dynasty, and accompanied Puyi in exile from the Forbidden City in Beijing to the foreign concessions in Tianjin in 1927.

Xie was later recruited by the warlord of Kirin Province, General Xi Qia, and assisted him in his negotiations with the Imperial Japanese Army after the Manchurian Incident, during which time Xi Qia declared Kirin Province independent from the Kuomintang government of the Republic of China.

After the state of Manchukuo was established, Xie became first Minister of Foreign Affairs. He assisted in the efforts to convince General Ma Zhanshan to support the new government. Through his efforts, many Taiwanese emigrated from Taiwan to Manchukuo in the 1930s. He was assigned as ambassador plenipotentiary to Japan on 19 June 1935, and helped organize the 1935 Taiwan Expo. He returned to Manchukuo in 1937 to assume the position of Minister of Industry. He shortly left government service for the private sector. After the fall of Manchukuo in 1945, Xie was arrested by the ROC government as a Japanese collaborator and traitor, and taken into custody until his release in 1948. He later died in Beijing in 1954. Until the late 1990s, some Taiwanese media claimed that Xie had died imprisoned in 1946, without a trial.

In 2013, two of Xie's descendants who lived in China met with one of his Taiwan-based descendants in Kaohsiung, after the release of a documentary, Taiwanese in Manchukuo (台灣人在滿洲國).
