= Self-Government Guiding Board =

The Self-Government Guiding Board (Japanese: 自治指導部) was organized by the Imperial Japanese Army, in Mukden during the last half of September 1931 following the Mukden Incident and Invasion of Manchuria. The purpose of the Board was to start an independence movement and spread it throughout Manchuria. Colonel Seishirō Itagaki was in charge of the Staff Section having supervision over the Board; and Colonel Kenji Doihara, as head of the Special Service Office, supplied the Board with all necessary confidential information regarding the Chinese. Although the chairman of the Board was Chinese, approximately 90 per cent of the personnel employed by the Board were Japanese residents in Manchuria.
