= Concordia Association =

Concordia Association of Manchukuo 滿洲國協和會 (Japanese, Chinese) Mǎnzhōuguó Xiéhehuì Manshū-koku Kyōwakai ᠮᠠᠨᠵᡠ ᡤᡠᡵᡠᠨ ᠰᡳᡝᡥᠣᡥᡠᡳ
- Leader: Puyi
- Founded: July 1932; 94 years ago
- Dissolved: August 1945; 81 years ago
- Headquarters: Xinjing, Manchukuo
- Ideology: Fascism; Monarchism; Manchurian nationalism Pan-Asianism
- Political position: Far-right
- Anthem: "協和行進歌" ("Concorde Marching Song")

Party flag

Concordia Association

Chinese name
- Traditional Chinese: 滿洲國協和會
- Simplified Chinese: 满洲国协和会
Transcriptions
Standard Mandarin
- Hanyu Pinyin: Mǎnzhōuguó Xiéhehuì
- Wade–Giles: Man^{3}-chou^{1}-kuo^{2} Hsieh^{2}-ho-hui^{4}

Japanese name
- Kyūjitai: 滿洲國協和會
- Shinjitai: 満州国協和会
Transcriptions
- Revised Hepburn: Manshū-koku Kyōwakai

The Concordia Association of Manchukuo (Chinese: 滿洲國協和會; pinyin: Mǎnzhōuguó Xiéhehuì; Wade–Giles: Man^{3}-chou^{1}-kuo^{2} Hsieh^{2}-ho-hui^{4}, Shinjitai: 満州国協和会, Hepburn: Manshū-koku Kyōwakai) was a political party in Manchukuo. Established to promote the ideals of Pan-Asianism and the creation of a multi-ethnic nation-state and to create a structure which would gradually replace military rule over Manchukuo with civilian control, the party was unable to fulfill its promise, and was eventually subverted into an instrument of totalitarian state-control by the Japanese Kwantung Army.

== Background ==
The name "Concordia Association" came from the concept of the "concord of nationalities" (民族協和; mínzú xiéhe) promoted by the Pan-Asian movement. By granting different peoples or nationalities their communal rights and limited self-determination under a centralized state structure, Manchukuo attempted to present itself as a nation-state in the mode of the Soviet "union of nationalities". Political theorist Tominaga Tadashi, author of Manshū no Minzoku ("Nationalities of Manchuria"), wrote extensively about Soviet policies towards national self-determination. The Concord of Nationalities policy was promoted as a policy that fulfilled the goals of federalism and protected minority rights, while at the same time it strengthened central state control to avoid the separatism that had weakened the old Russian Empire.

== Development ==
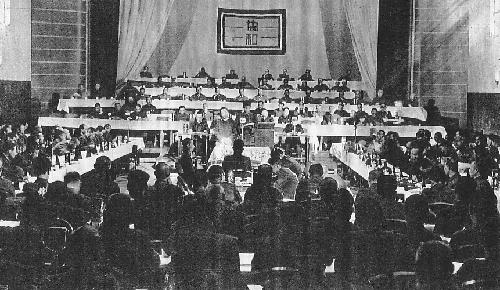
Meeting of the Concordia Association

After its establishment, Manchukuo was effectively run by the Japanese Kwantung Army along totalitarian lines. The Legislative Council existed primarily as a formality to rubber-stamp decrees issued by the General Affairs State Council with Puyi officially vested with great powers but serving de facto as a Japanese puppet.

Although not officially a one-party state, political dissent was severely punished, and the only officially sanctioned political party was the Concordia Association. However, émigré nationalities were permitted to form political associations, primarily to promote their various agendas towards their home countries. These included a variety of White Russian parties supporting either fascism or a restoration of the Romanov dynasty and a number of Zionist movements for Jewish refugees.

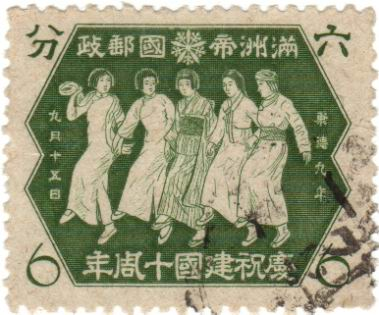
Manchukuo commemorative stamp promoting ideals of Concord of Nationalities

The structure of the Concordia Association was reorganized to mimic the Japanese Taisei Yokusankai which was founded in 1940. All government officials and bureaucrats, including teachers, as well as important figures in society were members. All youth between the ages of sixteen and nineteen were automatically enrolled beginning in 1937; and by 1943, Association membership included about 10% of the population of Manchukuo.

In theory, the Concordia Association would ultimately replace the Kwantung Army as the effective political power in Manchukuo: however, by the mid-1930s, the Kwantung Army ordered the Association "purged" of its original leadership for alleged leftist tendencies. The Association was thus subverted into means of extending mobilization and surveillance rather than providing national ethnic, cultural, and occupational representation in government.

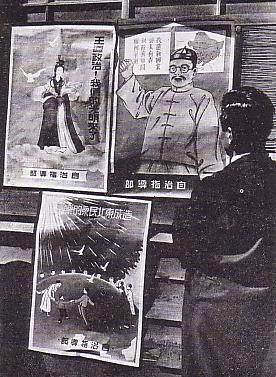
Propaganda Posters in Manchukuo

After the purge, Concordia Association came to closely resemble contemporary “totalitarian parties” in Europe. Like its fascist counterparts, it was corporatist, anti-communist, anticapitalist, and sought to overcome class divisions by organizing people through both occupational and ethnic communities, while promoting a dirigiste economy. The Association was distinctive in representing Asian communities—Mongols, Manchus, Hui Muslims, Koreans, Japanese and White Russian émigrés, as well as the majority Han—and their traditions. This commitment often meant supporting the religious leadership among these peoples: Mongol lamas, Manchu shamans, Muslim ahongs, Buddhist monks, and Confucian moralists. The regime's control of local society was enhanced by the work of association units established within Manchu villages, Hui mosques, and the Chinese community self-surveillance system (baojia).

Japanese ideologists like Tachibana Shiraki saw no contradiction between the goals of republicanism, equality, and modernization, on the one hand, and the "Eastern" values of community, solidarity, and the moral state, on the other. In practice, however, the very different programs and interests pursued by the military and the pan-Asianists led to many tensions and resulted in a polarized rather than harmonious society. Mongol youth demanded modern education and the elimination of the power of the lamas; Chinese supporters were divided between monarchists who favored the restoration of the emperor and republicans who opposed it. Before these tensions could be overcome and a truly independent state created, the Japanese military derailed the process by plunging Manchukuo into the Second Sino-Japanese War.
