= Fengtian clique =

Chinese warlord faction in control of Manchuria (1911–1928)

- 奉系
- The Fengtian clique flew the flag of the Beiyang Government until 1928. (Note: After the National Protection War and until 1928, two entities claimed to be the legitimate national government of the Republic of China: the Beiyang (Northern) Government based in Beijing and the Kuomintang (southern) government based in Guangdong. Various warlord factions expressed their recognition of one of these claims by flying the flag associated with that regime.)
- Active: 1911–1928
- Disbanded: 1928
- Country: Republic of China
- Allegiance: Beiyang government (1911–1927)
- Type: Warlord faction
- Engagements: First Zhili–Fengtian War; Second Zhili–Fengtian War; Anti-Fengtian War; Northern Expedition

Commanders
- Commander-in-Chief (1920–1928): Zhang Zuolin
- Commander-in-Chief (1928): Zhang Xueliang

The Fengtian Government (Chinese: 奉系军阀; pinyin: Fèngxì Jūnfá; Wade–Giles: Feng-hsi Chün-fa) was the faction that supported warlord Zhang Zuolin during China's Warlord Era. It took its name from Fengtian Province, which served as its original base of support. However, the clique quickly came to control all of the Three Northeastern Provinces. The clique received support from Japan in exchange for protecting Japanese military and economic interests in Manchuria. The Fengtian Army frequently intervened in many of the conflicts of the Warlord Era.

Following the Zhili–Anhui War of 1920 and 1921, the Fengtian and Zhili cliques exercised joint control of Beijing and the Beiyang Government. Tensions soon began building between the two, resulting in clashes for control of Beijing known as the First Zhili–Fengtian War (1922). The Second (1924) Zhili–Fengtian War started later over the Zhili invasion of the remnants of the Anhui clique, which had become allies of the Fengtian Clique, which resulted in a Fengtian victory, with the Zhili clique retreating as far south as Henan. The power of the Fengtian Clique began to decrease in the midst of the Kuomintang's Northern Expedition. In 1928, Zhang Zuolin was killed by his Japanese sponsors who blew up his train while he was retreating North. After Zuolin's assassination, his son, Zhang Xueliang, took over the leadership of the clique. He preferred to work with the Kuomintang rather than the Japanese and symbolically pledged allegiance to the Nationalist Government in Nanjing. In practice, the Fengtian clique continued to independently govern Manchuria until the Japanese invasion in 1931.

== Foundations of the Fengtian clique ==
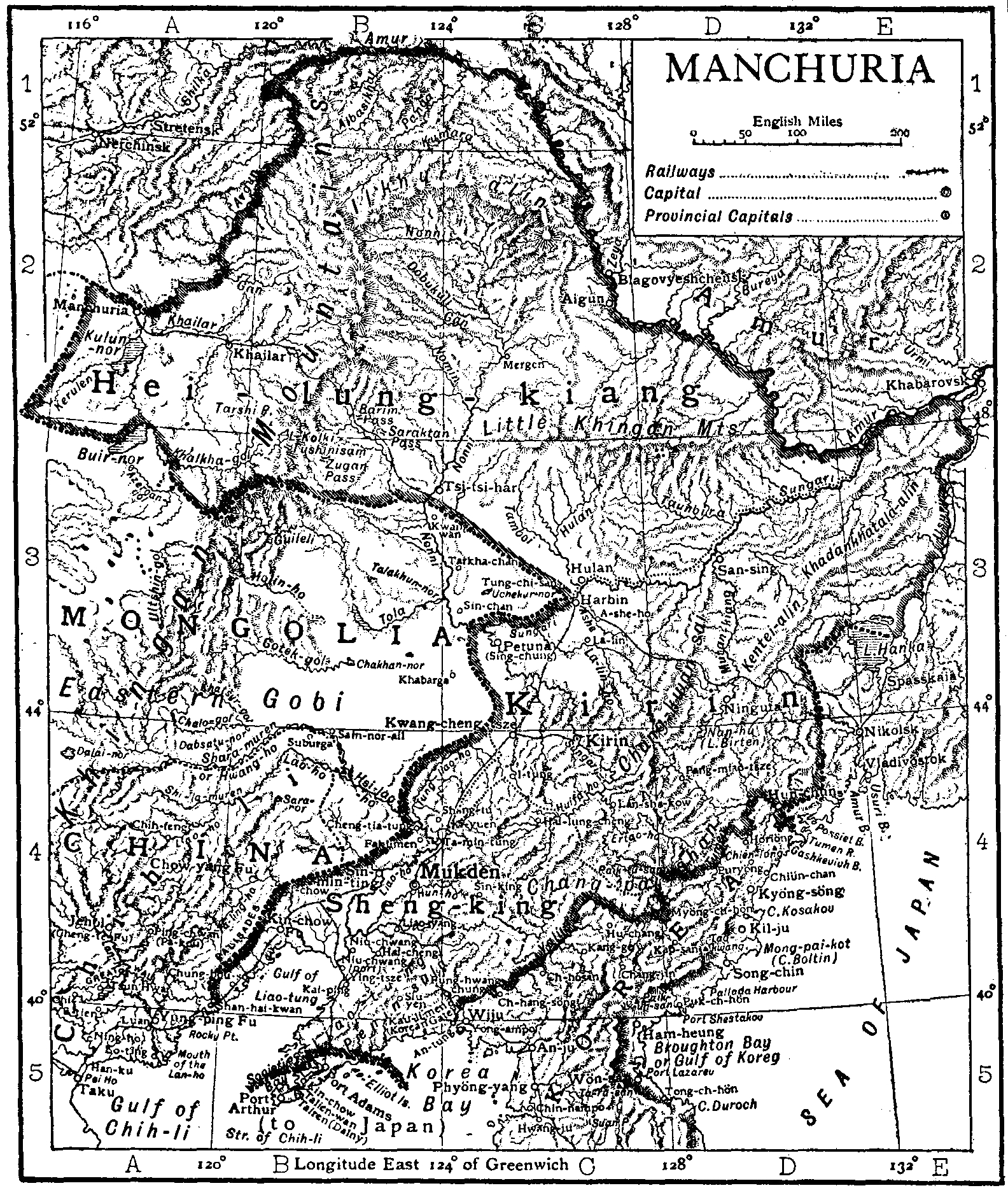
Map of the Three Northeast Provinces of Manchuria, 1911

During the late Qing Dynasty, Manchuria was organized as the Viceroyalty of the Three Northeastern Provinces, consisting of Jilin, Fengtian, and Heilongjiang. The capital was at Shenyang (then known as Mukden) in Fengtian. When the Wuchang Uprising broke out, revolutionaries established networks in the Manchurian New Army. Unlike other provinces, the revolution had much less support from the populace. Governor Zhao Erxun and the local militia forged an alliance, collaborating with local elites and constitutionalists. After Puyi abdicated the throne in 1912, Manchu nobles in the area tried to establish an independent Manchu state, an attempt that failed. Huang Xing, commander-in-chief of the Republic of China, was willing to cede Manchuria to Japan and mentioned the concept of China proper when asking for support from the empire. (Previously, Manchuria had been the location of the Russo-Japanese War fought inside Qing territory, while the Three Northeastern Provinces hosted the politically tense Chinese Eastern Railway, a Russian concession, whose southern half had been ceded to Japan in 1905. This geopolitical context influenced political and economic decisions in Manchuria.)

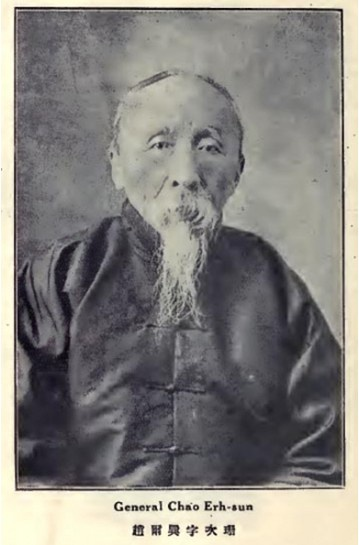
Zhao Erxun, Viceroy (1911) and Governor (1912) of Fengtian

In a conference between the Manchurian revolutionaries, provincial assembly, Viceroy Zhao Erxun with local officials, and the constitutionalist Wu Jinglian proposed that the Revolution was irresistible. They determined that Chinese of Manchuria should not blindly join in the domestic conflict, and instead stand guard against Japan and Russia. Song Gong and border patrol leader Zhang Zuolin pursued this policy of restraint. When Yuan Shikai was declared first President of the new Republic of China, Zhao pledged the Three Northeastern Provinces' loyalty to the Republic. Manchuria thus stayed as a part of China.

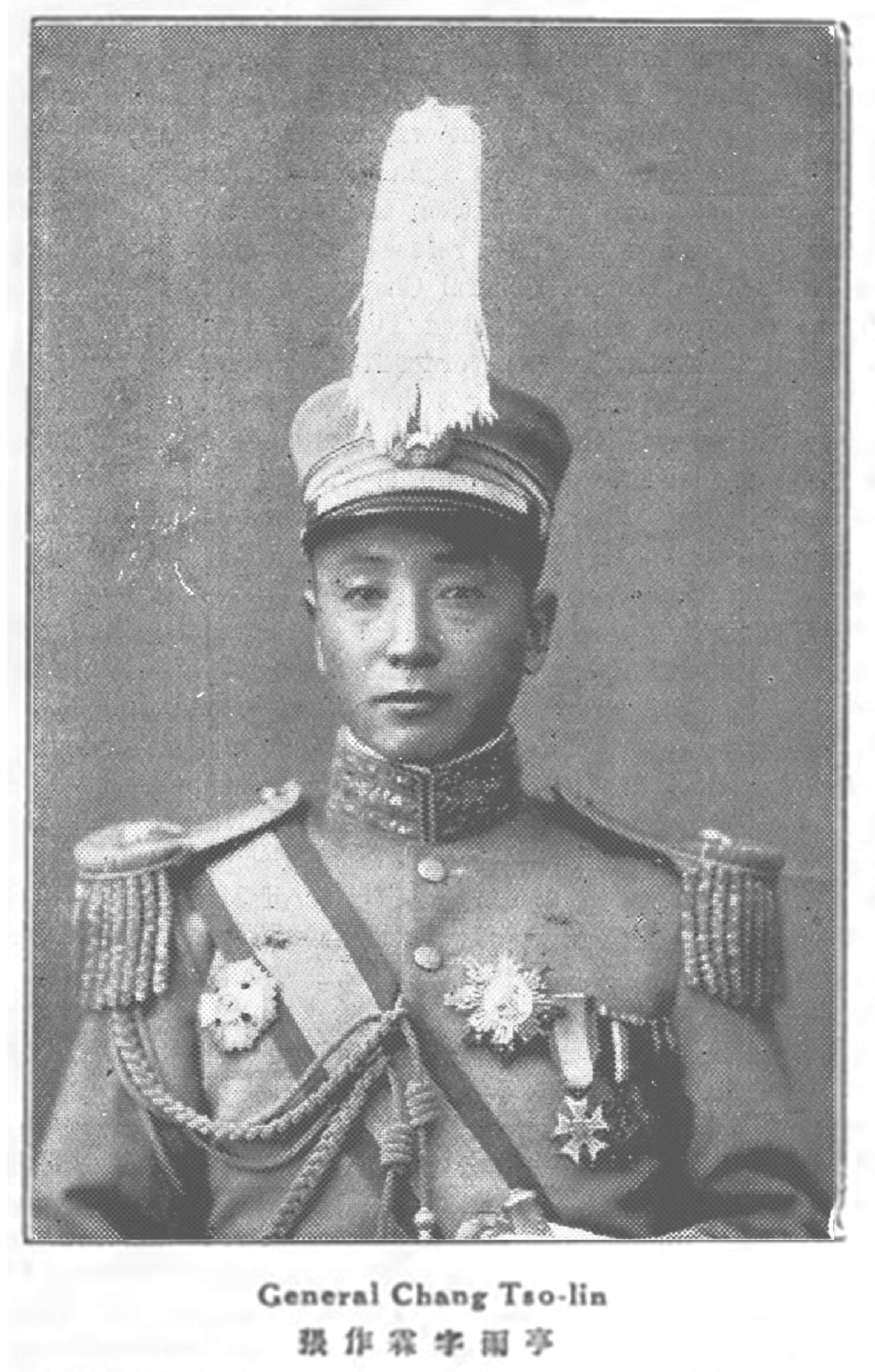
A portrait of Zhang Zuolin

Zhang Zuolin, who had pacified the provincial assembly with the threat of force, was made the commander of the 27th Division. This Division would gradually grow into the Fengtian Army. During Yuan Shikai's attempt to restore the Empire of China, Yuan tried to gain Zhang's support by promoting him to the position of military governor of Fengtian. When Yuan died in 1916, Zhang seized the opportunity to expel the military governor of Manchuria, Duan Zhigui. Instead of being punished for his subtle threats of force and expulsion of the military governor, Zhang was promoted by Duan Qirui, as he needed Zhang's cooperation, to the Inspector General of the Three Northeastern Provinces by late 1918.

Many local elites of Fengtian, such as Yuan Jinkai and Yu Chonghan, who were beneficiaries of political chaos, supported Zhang Zuolin in order to wrest power from their political enemies. Zhang and these elites formed an alliance against orders and appointments from the central government. This alliance between Zhang, military figures, and the local elite became known as the Fengtian Clique. The elite in the Northeast formed different "political parties", such as the Democratic Party (Minzhudang). Zhang exploited anti-tax protests to strengthen his local civil authority and his position to the Central Government. In 1916, Yuan Jingkai discussed with Zhang to expel Duan Zhigui. Zhang was assisted after his rise to power by local bureaucrats and civilian elites. However, he also invited people from the rest of China to Manchuria to serve as officials and officers.

== Zhili–Anhui War ==
With Duan Qirui's Anhui clique using some funds from the Nishihara Loans to invade Outer Mongolia and build up his army, the Fengtian and Zhili cliques, feeling threatened by growing Anhui dominance, created an alliance and banded with the Southern Warlords to take down the Anhui Clique. On July 12, 1920, the warlord coalition officially denounced the Anhui Clique.

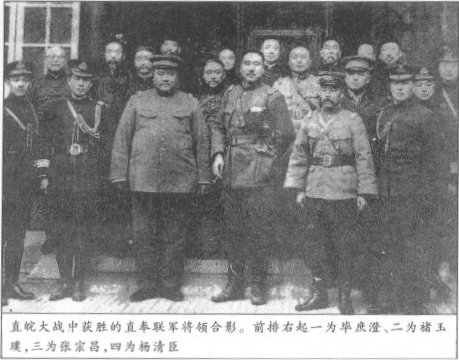
A group photo of commanders of the Zhili–Fengtian united army, victors of the Zhili–Anhui war. From right to left, on the first row: Hua Shucheng, Zhu Yuxi, Zhang Zongchang, Yang Qingchen

The Zhili–Anhui War lasted for a week, with the remnants of the Anhui clique escaping to Zhejiang and Shanghai. While the Fengtian clique contributed little to the victory of the coalition, Zhang Zuolin did notably attack Shanhai Pass in the Great Wall. The Fengtian clique was allowed to form a joint government in Beijing with the Zhili Clique.

Shortly after, the Washington Naval Conference was held, leading to the Nine-Power Treaty and agreements that the foreign powers hoped would dictate the new order in East Asia and the Pacific. The Washington Conference also agreed on the implementation of the "Washington System", headed by the US, a system that would have guaranteed more customs revenue for China, strengthened its government, and dismantled grievances against foreigners. For a time, the Washington System was a system many in the West thought would be implemented. However, this never happened, partly due to wars, and, more importantly, due to the "Gold Franc Dispute", where some countries insisted that China pay its Boxer indemnity payments through gold specie instead of the Franc, which had by then depreciated in value, a demand that V. K. Wellington Koo rejected adamantly, leading to France refusing to ratify the treaties.

== Politics ==
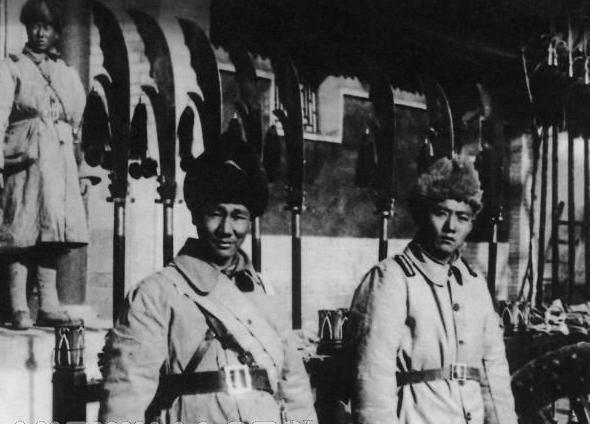
Fengtian soldiers wearing ushankas

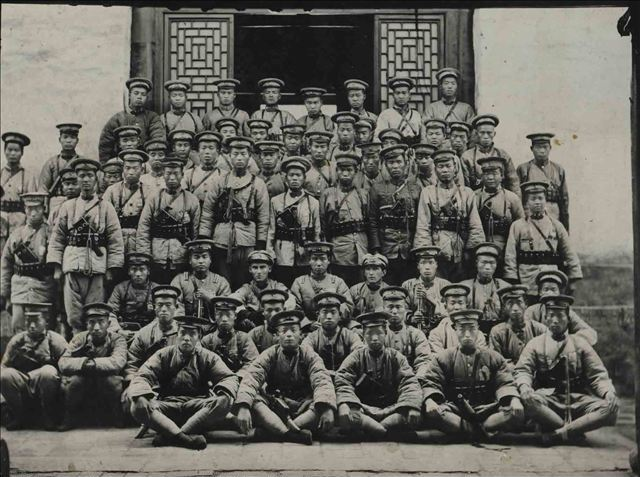
Zhang Zongchang's army equipped with Mauser C96s

As Inspector-General of the Three Northeastern Provinces, Zhang oversaw civil and military affairs for Manchuria. Additionally, he was both the civil and military governor of Fengtian Province. After the First Zhili–Fengtian War in 1922, Zhang distanced himself heavily from the Zhili clique who dominated Beijing and the National Government, creating the Three Northeastern Provinces Defense Headquarters (Dongsansheng Baoan Silingbu), merging the position of Inspector-General and the Fengtian Military Governor. Wang Yongjiang was given control of the civilian government of Fengtian Province. The military governors of Jilin and Heilongjiang provinces became deputy commanders-in-chief. Civilian governors were also put in Jilin and Heilongjiang so as to distribute power within their provincial governments.

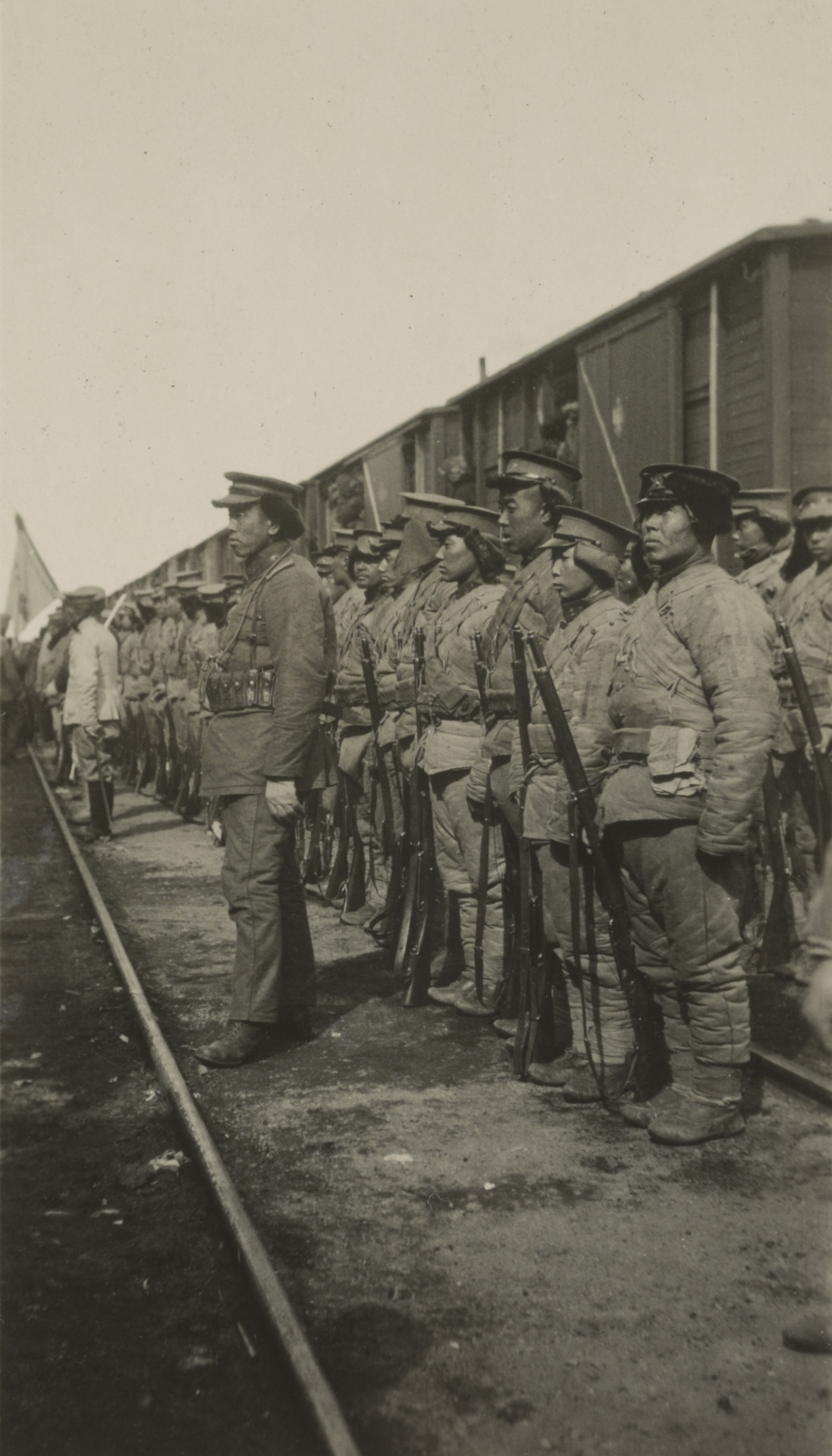
The Fengtian Army in 1917

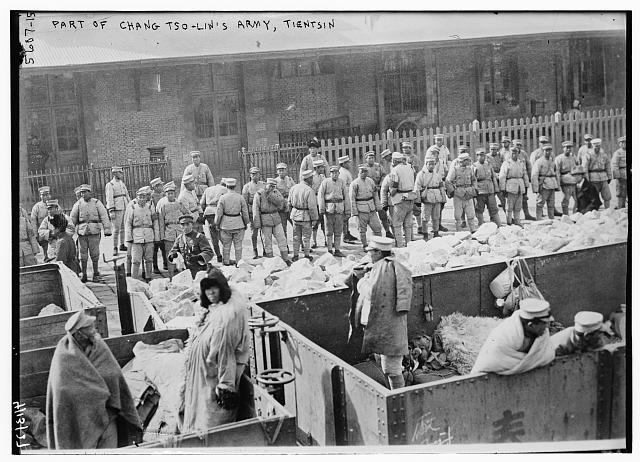
Zhang Zuolin's troops in Tianjin

The Fengtian Army consisted of, at first, a tight-knit group of militia commanders. After Zhang Zuolin took power, new officers were brought in, all with different military and educational backgrounds. One of these, Yang Yuting, brought other Shikan Gakkou graduates to Fengtian, and became Zhang's Chief of Staff. Other officers were brought in from the Staff College of Beijing, their informal leader being Guo Songling. The officers broke into their own internal cliques – the "Shikan Clique" and the "Staff College Clique". The Shikan Clique wanted to intervene in Chinese politics more directly and actively, while the Staff College Clique opposed many military ventures. In 1924, Guo was given no posts in China proper, and rebelled in November 1925, causing the Shikan Clique to take control of military affairs and Manchurian politics until the execution of Yang Yuting and Chang Yinhuai.

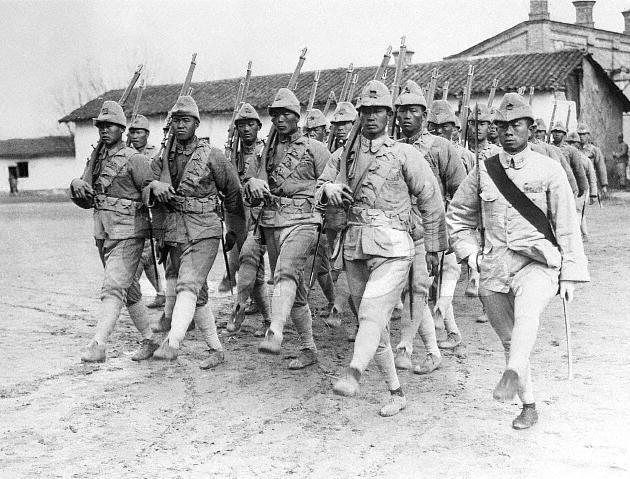
Forces under the command of Zhang Zongchang, 1927

This civil–military system was rearranged in 1926 afted Fengtian victory in the Second Zhili–Fengtian War and the Anti-Fengtian War, with the establishment of the Anguojun (National Pacification Army). The Anguojun Headquarters was very similar to the Three Northeastern Provinces Defense Headquarters, with its main difference being that it was located in Beijing instead of Mukden. In June 1927, Zhang Zuolin was appointed Grand Marshal (Generalissimo) of the Republic of China (Dayuanshuai, not to be confused with Chiang Kai-shek's title of Teji shangjiang). The Anguojun headquarters was reorganized into the Grand Marshal Government. The Three Northeastern Provinces Defense Headquarters was reorganized into the Grand Marshal Headquarters and was expanded to control the Anguojun under Yang Yuting. The Ministry of War controlled the operations of the Army, Navy, and Air Force. However, Zhang had the final say in everything, while power was delegated to his subordinates in these organizations, something which said subordinates exploited.

== Administration and economy ==
In 1918, Zhang Zuolin revived the provincial assemblies, which allowed the elite to identify their interests with the state, with authorities representing bureaucratic, commercial, and educational interests. The local population of Manchuria participated in these assemblies too, as a way to advance their positions and receive government bribes. Bribery played an important part in the elections, with regulations and institutionalization of it. In 1927, 800,000+ people were allowed to vote, electing 64 members to the provincial assembly. A county within the Kwantung Leased Territory also asked to join.

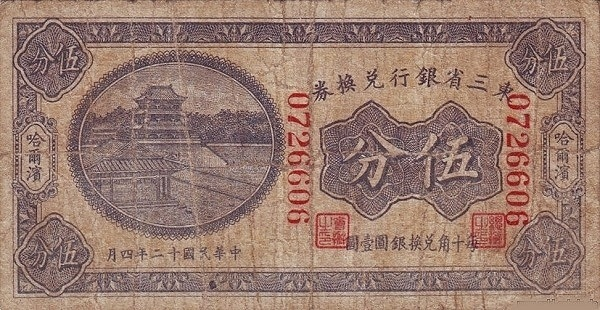
5 cent banknote from the Bank of Manchuria, 1923

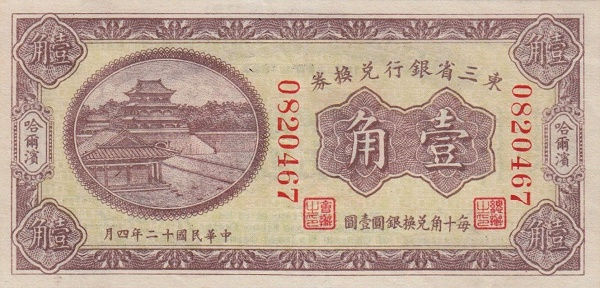
10 cent banknote from the Bank of Manchuria, 1923

Fengtian chambers of commerce were also incredibly important. They were used to monitor the business environment and encourage commerce and trade. They assisted in supplying the Fengtian Army and levying taxes for Zhang Zuolin. Many business leaders came from the bureaucratic group that participated in the provincial assembly, so their interests were represented through Zhang Zuolin. However, business interests did come into conflict with Zhang's political interests sometimes, especially during and after the Second Zhili–Fengtian War. When wars did not provide immediate benefits for the Manchurian economy, doubts started to surface about Zhang. However, Zhang still held authority over civilian organizations and government organs in Fengtian. Zhang used these organs for his own interest, including using the Fengtian Chamber of Commerce in protesting against Japanese demands in 1927.

== Foreign relations ==
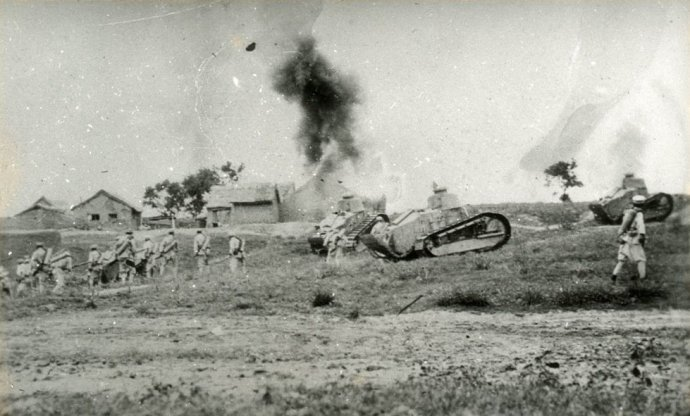
Renault FT tanks of the Fengtian army, c. 1928.

Manchuria, during the Xinhai Revolution, was looked upon by foreign powers as an easy target for its industry, land, and economic benefits. In 1911, the Japanese and Russians, seeing an opportunity, decided to divide Manchuria. However, the director of the Mantetsu, Nakamura Yoshikoto, believed that encouraging the revolutionaries would directly lead to an easy full occupation of Manchuria by Japan. Throughout the revolution, Zhao Erxun and Zhang Zuolin managed to preserve order in the provinces, avoiding a Japanese invasion. In 1912, Zhang cracked down on a Japanese–Manchu plot to create an independent Manchuria.

In order to cement their control over Manchuria during the Republican era, Russia and Japan continued to invest in railroads. Japan forced the Twenty-One Demands (shortened to thirteen after initial negotiations) as an ultimatum to President Yuan Shikai, extending their territorial lease, allowing subjects to have land loaned to them, and giving them the rights to the Jilin–Changchun Railway. Another Japanese coup was planned in 1915 but was aborted. The Japanese continued to exert their influence in China through loans, abandoning their aggressive stance. In 1918, the Japanese lent Duan Qirui the Nishihara Loans, of which ten million yen for the Jilin-Huining Railway and thirty million for developing industries in Jilin and Heilongjiang. Twenty more were used to invest in planned railways. However, most of the money was used to fund Duan Qirui's army and was used in the Zhili–Anhui War. Zhang Zuolin in Mukden borrowed three million more from Japan to reorganize his finances.

Throughout the late 1910s and early 1920s, Western Great Powers tried to limit Japanese influence in China. The Washington Conference of 1921 was seen by the Imperial Japanese Army as an attempt by the West to obstruct Japanese influence. In order to preserve their influence, Japan supported Zhang Zuolin as long as it benefited them. Sir Charles Elliot, British ambassador to Japan, noted that the Japanese, "while anxious to keep on good terms with [Zhang Zuolin], thought it unwise to commit themselves unreservedly to the support of any one Chinese party."

An ally and commander of the Fengtian clique, Zhang Zongchang recruited Russian White (tsarist) emigres for a detachment that he was forming in anticipation of the Second Zhili-Fengtian War. Russian mercenaries in China were numerous due to the previous Russian leased territory in Manchuria, the Chinese Eastern Railway, which still had many Russian employees. For many emigres, serving the northern warlords was a way to continue the fight against the Bolsheviks. Zhang's Russian forces were commanded by Konstantin Petrovich Nechaev from 1924 to 1927. Additionally, Zhang attached a Japanese company to his Russian company in 1924. The Russian units had the extensive experience in the First World War and the Russian Civil War, were the brave warriors and had a reputation in 1924–1926 as "Invincible", nicknamed by the Chinese "Lamoza". Russian engineers built several armored trains in the city of Tsinan (Jinan), which were used as the strike forces in the capture of cities. By 1927, the enemy, the "southern" Chinese groups, also learned to fight thanks to the Soviet instructors, and the importance of the Russian White Detachment became small. In 1928–1929, the Russian detachment of General Nechaev was disbanded, the losses amounted to over 1800 people, most of whom were buried in the cemetery in Jinan.

The Soviet Union, determined to retake the Chinese Eastern Railway and recover their influence in China, threatened Zhang Zuolin that they would recognize other warlords. The Soviets reached out to Zhang Zuolin in 1920 and 1921 to discuss Mongolia and the Chinese Eastern Railway, but Zhang maintained that he wanted to retake Outer Mongolia as soon as he could. In September 1924, an agreement was reached, in which Zhang agreed to recognize the Soviets and give them control over the railway in return for the Soviets withholding their plans for Outer Mongolia and subversive activities in China.

== See also ==
- Warlord Era
- List of warlords and military cliques in the Warlord Era
- History of the Republic of China
- Manchukuo
