= Family of Puyi =

Family of the last emperor of China

Puyi, the last emperor of China, came from a long noble ancestry. His father was Zaifeng, Prince Chun, his mother was Youlan, and his consorts were Wanrong, Wenxiu, Tan Yuling, Li Yuqin and Li Shuxian. He did not have children.

== Family ==
Quotation from Puyi:

My father had two wives, and they bore him four sons and seven daughters.

The Pedigree of the Qing House flow chart can be found in Puyi's autobiography.

Quotation from Puyi (referring only to his first four wives):

... they were not real wives and were only there for show.

=== Paternal side ===
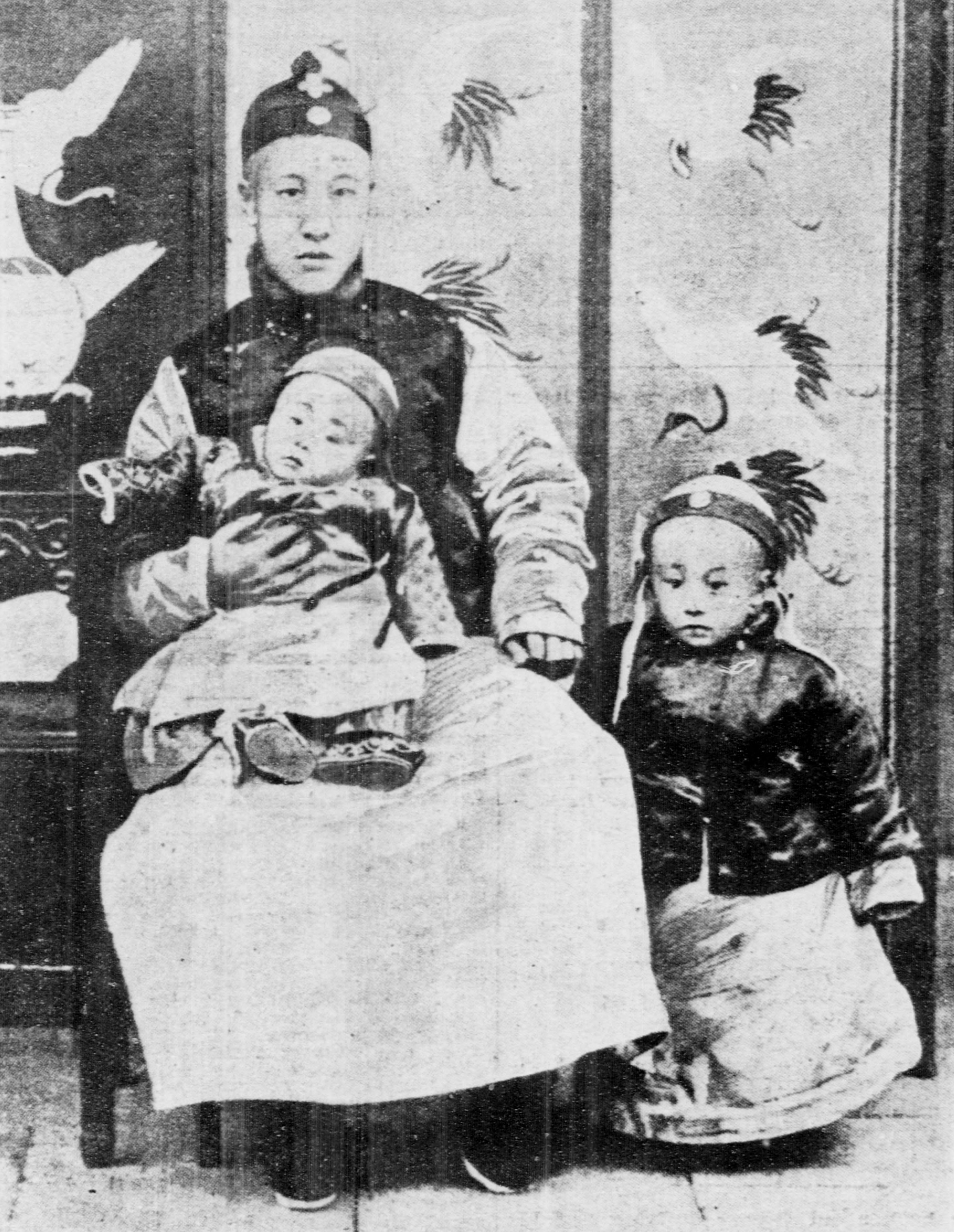
A three-year-old Puyi (right), standing next to his father (Zaifeng, Prince Chun) and his younger brother Pujie

Puyi's great-grandfather was the Daoguang Emperor (r. 1820–1850), who was succeeded by his fourth son, the Xianfeng Emperor (r. 1850–1861).

Puyi's paternal grandfather was Yixuan, Prince Chun (1840–1891), the seventh son of the Daoguang Emperor and a younger half-brother of the Xianfeng Emperor. The Xianfeng Emperor was succeeded by his only son, who became the Tongzhi Emperor (r. 1861–1875).

The Tongzhi Emperor died at the age of 18 without a son, and was succeeded by the Guangxu Emperor (r. 1875–1908), son of 1st Prince Chun and Lady Yehe Nara Wanzhen (younger sister of Empress Dowager Cixi). The Guangxu Emperor died without an heir.

Puyi, who succeeded the Guangxu Emperor, was the eldest son of Zaifeng, Prince Chun, who was born to Yixuan, Prince Chun and his second concubine Liugiya Cuiyan (1866–1925). Lady Liugiya had been a maid in the residence of Yixuan. Born to a Han Bannerman family, her original family name was Liu (劉), and this was changed to the Manchu clan name Liugiya when she became the concubine of Yixuan and was transferred to a Manchu banner. Zaifeng was therefore a younger half-brother of the Guangxu Emperor and the first in line to succession after Guangxu.

Puyi was in a branch of the Aisin Gioro clan with close ties to Empress Dowager Cixi, who was from the Yehe Nara clan. Cixi's niece, who later became Empress Dowager Longyu (1868–1913), was married to the Guangxu Emperor.

Puyi had a younger full brother, Pujie (1907–1994), who married a cousin of Emperor Hirohito, Lady Hiro Saga. The rules of succession were changed to allow Pujie to succeed Puyi, who had no children.

Puyi's last surviving younger half-brother Puren (b. 1918) adopted the Chinese name Jin Youzhi and lived in China until his death in 2015. In 2006 Jin Youzhi filed a lawsuit in regards to the rights to Puyi's image and privacy. The lawsuit claimed that those rights were violated by the exhibit "China's Last Monarch and His Family".

Puyi's second cousin, Pu Xuezhai (溥雪齋), was a musician who played the guqin, and an artist of Chinese painting.

=== Maternal side ===
Puyi's mother was Youlan (1884–1921), the daughter of Ronglu (1836–1903), a statesman and general from the Gūwalgiya clan. Ronglu was one of the leaders of the conservative faction in the Qing court, and a staunch supporter of Empress Dowager Cixi; Cixi rewarded his support by marrying his daughter, Puyi's mother, into the imperial family.

The Gūwalgiya clan was regarded as one of the most powerful Manchu clans in the Qing dynasty. Oboi, an influential military commander and statesman who was a regent during the Kangxi Emperor's reign, was from the Guwalgiya clan.

=== Consorts ===
==== Empresses ====
- Empress Xiaokemin, of the Gobulo clan (皇后 郭布羅氏; 13 November 1906 – 20 June 1946), fourth cousin thrice removed, personal name Wanrong (婉容)
- Empress Xiaoruimin, of the Li clan (李氏; 4 September 1924 – 9 June 1997), personal name Shuxian (淑賢)

=== Noble Consort ===
- Noble Consort Mingxian, of the Tan clan (明賢貴妃 譚氏; 11 August 1920 – 14 August 1942), personal name Yuling (玉齡)

=== Consort ===
- Consort Shu, of the Erdet clan (淑妃 鄂爾德特氏; 20 December 1909 – 17 September 1953), personal name Wenxiu (文繡)

=== Noble Lady ===
- Noble Lady Fu, of the Li clan (福嬪 李氏; 15 July 1928 – 24 April 2001), personal name Yuqin (玉琴)

=== In detail ===
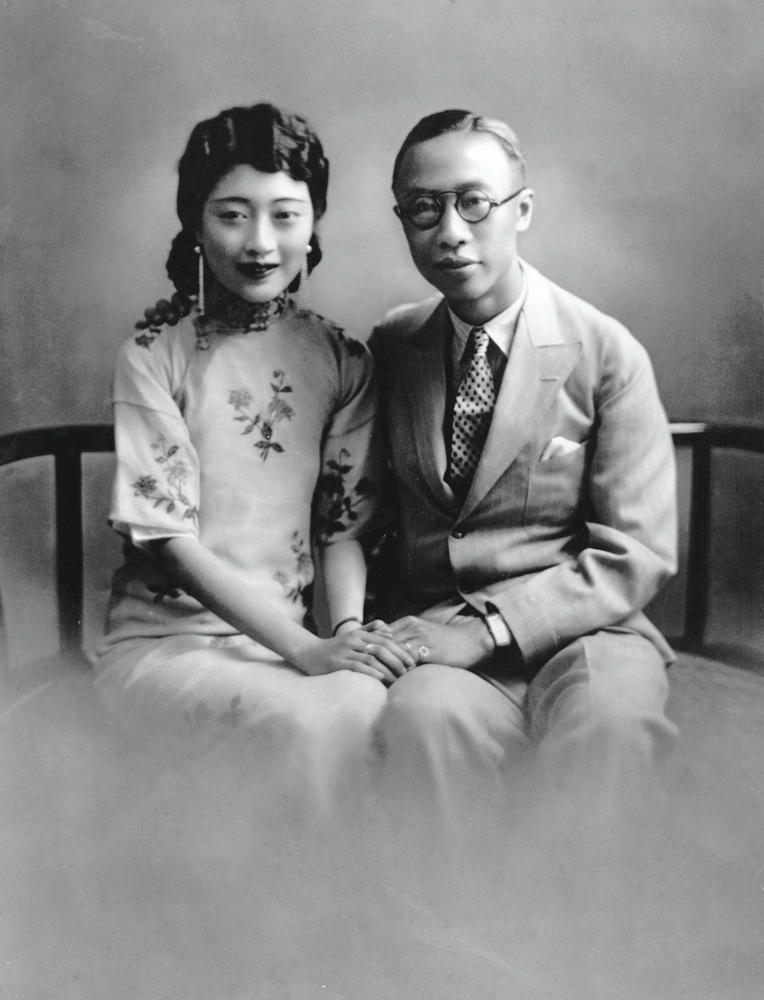
Wanrong and Puyi in Tianjin

In 1921, it was decided by the Dowager Consorts (the four widows of the emperors before Puyi) that it was time for the 15-year-old Puyi to be married, although court politics dragged the complete process (from selecting the bride, up through the wedding ceremony) out for almost two years. Puyi saw marriage as his coming of age benchmark, when others would no longer control him. He was given four photographs to choose from. Puyi stated they all looked alike to him, with the exception of different clothing. He chose Wenxiu. Political factions within the palace made the actual choice as to whom Puyi would marry. The selection process alone took an entire year.

1. Wanrong
  Puyi's second choice for his wife was Wanrong, a Daur. She married Puyi in 1922 and became his Empress. Her father, Rong Yuan (榮源), was a Minister of Domestic Affairs. She was considered beautiful and came from a wealthy family. By Puyi's own account, he abandoned Wanrong in the bridal chamber and went back to his own room. He maintained that she was willing to be a wife in name only, in order to carry the title of Empress. The couple's relationship was good initially, and Puyi showed preference over Wenxiu for Wanrong and displayed trust in her. However, after Wenxiu left in 1931, Puyi blamed Wanrong and stopped speaking to her and ignored her presence. She became addicted to opium, and eventually died in a prison in Yanji, Jilin after being arrested by Chinese Communist soldiers.
2. Wenxiu
  Puyi's first choice for his wife was Wenxiu, from the Erdet (鄂爾德特) clan. She married Puyi in 1922. Although she was Puyi's first choice, the Four Dowager Consorts felt that Wenxiu came from an unacceptable impoverished family and was not beautiful enough to be Empress, so they told the court officials to ask Puyi to choose again. The second time Puyi chose Wanrong, who became Empress, while Wenxiu was designated as Consort Shu (淑妃). Puyi and Wenxiu divorced in 1931. Puyi awarded her a house in Beijing and $300,000 in alimony, to be provided by the Japanese. In his autobiography, Puyi stated her reason for the divorce was the emptiness of life with him in exile, her desire for an ordinary family life, and his own inability to see women as anything but slaves and tools of men. According to Puyi, she worked as a school teacher for some years after the divorce. She married Major Liu Zhendong in 1947.
3. Tan Yuling
  Puyi's third wife, Tan Yuling, was a Manchu of the Tatara (他他拉) clan. She married Puyi in 1937 at the age of 16 on the recommendation of the daughter of Yulang (毓朗), a beile. She was designated as Puyi's Concubine Xiang (祥貴人). Puyi married her as "punishment" for Wanrong, and, "... because a second wife was as essential as palace furniture." She was also a wife in name only. She became ill in 1942 with typhoid, which the Japanese doctor said would not be fatal. After the doctor's consultation with Attaché to the Imperial Household Yasunori Yoshioka, Tan Yuling suddenly died. Puyi became suspicious of the circumstances when the Japanese immediately offered him photographs of Japanese girls for marriage. Puyi posthumously granted her the title Noble Consort Mingxian (明賢貴妃).
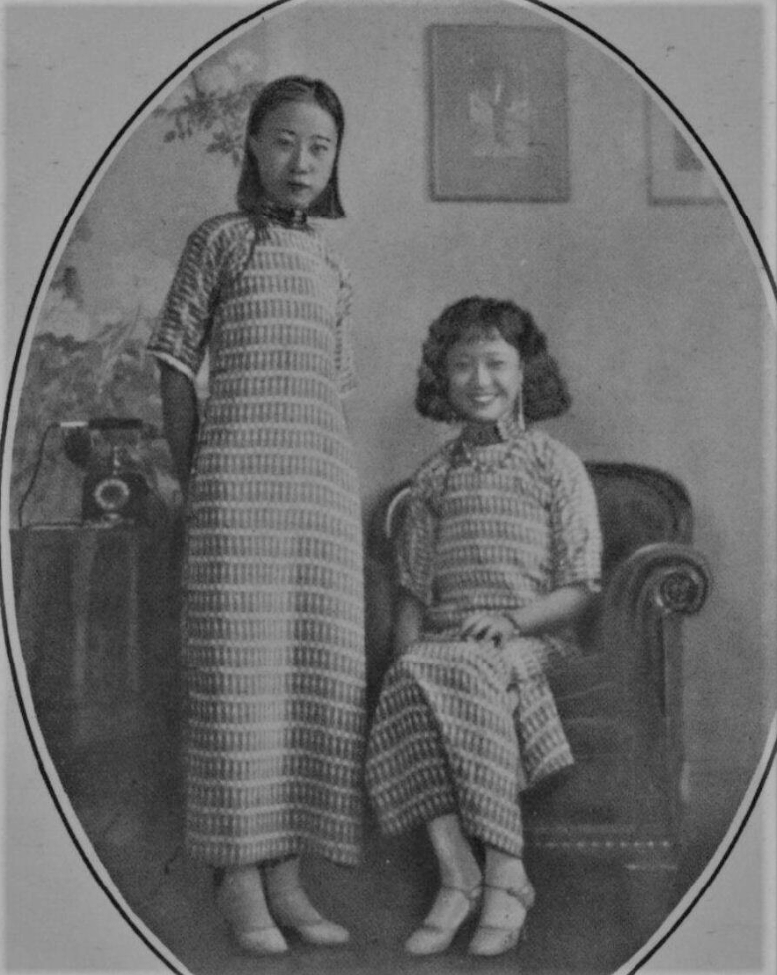
4. Two of Puyi's sisters
  Li Yuqin
  In 1943 Puyi married his fourth wife, a 15-year-old student named Li Yuqin, who was a Han Chinese from Changchun, Jilin. She was designated as Puyi's Concubine Fu (福貴人). In February 1943, school principal Kobayashi and teacher Fujii of the Nan-Ling Girls Academy took ten girl students to a photography studio for portraits. Three weeks later, the school teacher and the principal visited Li Yuqin's home and told her Puyi ordered her to go to the Manchukuo palace to study. She was first taken directly to Yasunori Yoshioka who thoroughly questioned her. Yoshioka then drove her back to her parents and told them Puyi ordered her to study at the palace. Money was promised to the parents. She was subjected to a medical examination and then taken to Puyi's sister Yunhe and instructed in palace protocol. Two years later when Manchukuo collapsed, Li Yuqin shared a train with Empress Wanrong, who was experiencing opium withdrawal symptoms at the time. They were both arrested by the Soviets and sent to a prison in Changchun. Li Yuqin was released in 1946 and sent back home. She worked in a textile factory while she studied the works of Karl Marx and Vladimir Lenin. In 1955 she began visiting Puyi in prison. After applying to the Chinese authorities for a divorce, the government responded on her next prison visit by showing her to a room with a double bed and ordered her to reconcile with Puyi, and she said the couple obeyed the order. She divorced Puyi in May 1957. She later married a technician, and had two sons. During the Cultural Revolution she became a target for attack by the Red Guards because she used to be Puyi's concubine. She died of liver problems in 2001.
5. Li Shuxian
  In 1962 under an arrangement with premier Zhou Enlai, Puyi married his fifth and last wife, Li Shuxian, a nurse of Han Chinese ethnicity. They had no children. She died of lung cancer in 1997. Li Shuxian recounted that they dated for six months before the marriage, and she found him to be "... a man who desperately needed my love and was ready to give me as much love as he could."
