= Kosei Fukunaga =

Manchu-Japanese noblewoman

Husheng
- Born: Aisin Gioro Husheng; 13 March 1940 (age 86); Juntendo University Hospital, Tokyo, Japan
- Spouse: Kenji Fukunaga (m. 1968)
- Children: Masako Fukunaga (daughter); Tsuneaki Fukunaga (son); Yukiyoshi Fukunaga (son); Hironobu Fukunaga (son); Noriko Fukunaga (daughter)
- House: Aisin Gioro
- Father: Pujie
- Mother: Hiro Saga

Husheng
- Traditional Chinese: 嫮生
Transcriptions
Standard Mandarin
- Hanyu Pinyin: Hùshēng

Kosei Fukunaga (福永 嫮生, Fukunaga Kosei) (born Aisin Gioro Husheng; 13 March 1940) is a Manchu-Japanese noblewoman. She was born in the Aisin Gioro clan, the imperial clan of the Qing dynasty. She is the younger daughter of Pujie, the younger brother of the last Chinese Emperor Xuantong, and her mother was Hiro Saga, a Japanese noblewoman who was distantly related to Emperor Shōwa.

== Biography ==
She was born Husheng at Juntendo University Hospital in Tokyo, Japan on 13 March 1940 to Pujie and Hiro Saga. Her elder sister was Huisheng who was born earlier in Xinjing, Manchukuo in 1938. In June of the same year, her family moved back to Xinjing.

Following the surrender of Japan, during the Evacuation of Manchukuo in the midst of the Soviet invasion of Manchuria in August 1945, Husheng's uncle Puyi planned for the imperial family members including Empress Wanrong, Li Yuqin and Husheng herself to escape to Korea by train, they first departed for Dalizi.

While they were at Dalizi, her uncle asked her mother Saga to oversee the imperial family members and provided her with precious antiques and cash to pay for their way south to Korea. Following which, her father and uncle left with a servant, former Kwantung Army General Yoshioka Yasunori, and a doctor to Tonghua, where they took a small plane to an airport in Mukden to wait for another plane bound for Japan.

In November, Saga's group was briefly held by two Soviet officers who asked to see the Empress. The group later moved from Dalizi to settle in a hotel in Linjiang county to pass the winter. In January 1946 they were discovered and captured by the Chinese Communist Eighth Route Army under He Changgong. In April, they were moved to and held at a police station in Changchun while Li Yuqin was returned to her family.

When the Kuomintang forces bombed Jilin in May, they were moved to a prison in Yanji. In June, they were moved to Mudanjiang, having to leave Wanrong behind at Yanji prison where she eventually died of malnutrition and opium withdrawal on 20 June. Saga, Husheng, and the imperial members were moved again and imprisoned in Kiamusze, and were released in July. By January 1947, Saga and Husheng were repatriated from Shanghai to Japan.

Back in Japan, they were reunited with Huisheng and stayed at their maternal grandfather Marquis Saneto Saga's house. Husheng and her elder sister Huisheng were educated at various prestigious private schools, including the Gakushūin in Tokyo. During that period, Huisheng and her lover died at Mount Amagi on 10 December 1957 in what appeared to be a murder-suicide case.

In November 1960, her father Pujie was released from Fushun War Criminals Management Centre at Fushun, Liaoning following the pardon by the Chinese government and joined the Communist Party. Husheng, who had not seen her father for 16 years, traveled to China with her mother the following year to visit him. Her parents were then reunited and settled in Beijing, while Husheng returned to Japan and became a Japanese citizen through naturalization. Later in 1963, Husheng traveled to China again and stayed with her parents for one year before returning to Japan.

== Personal life ==
In 1968, Husheng married Kenji Fukunaga (福永 健治, Fukunaga Kenji), the second son of the Fukunaga family who had deep acquaintance with the Saga family, in Kobe, Hyōgo Prefecture and she changed her name to Kosei Fukunaga. The couple have five children.

- 1st daughter: Masako Fukunaga (福永 雅子, Fukunaga Masako)
- 1st son: Tsuneaki Fukunaga (福永 恒明, Fukunaga Tsuneaki)
- 2nd son: Yukiyoshi Fukunaga (福永 行良, Fukunaga Yukiyoshi)
- 3rd son: Hironobu Fukunaga (福永 浩伸, Fukunaga Hironobu)
- 2nd daughter: Noriko Fukunaga (福永 典子, Fukunaga Noriko)

== Later life ==
Fukunaga has promoted friendly relations between China and Japan. She currently lives in Nishinomiya, Hyōgo Prefecture.

In 2013, she donated her deceased parents' letters and belongings to Kwansei Gakuin University.
