= Wang Mintong =

Manchu noblewoman (1913–2003)

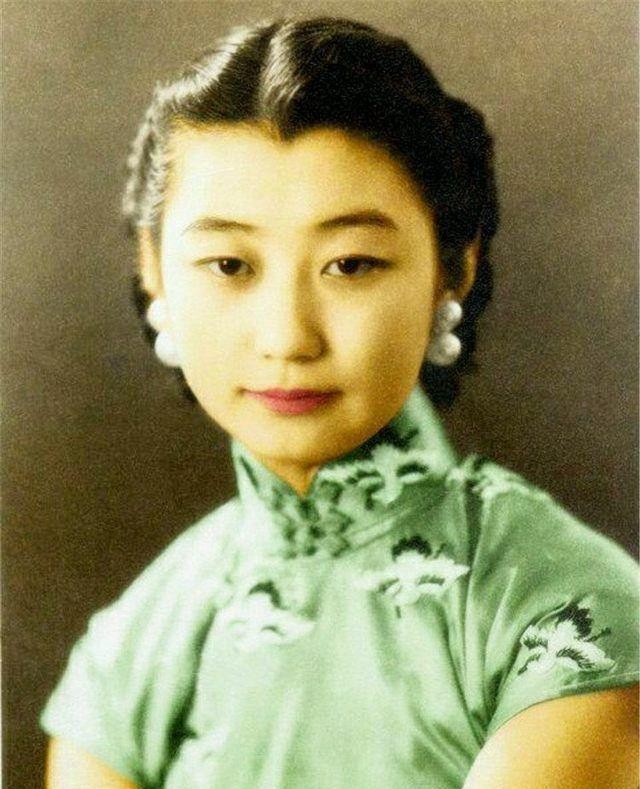
- Born: Wanyan Tongji; 1913; Beijing, Qing dynasty
- Died: February 28, 2003 (aged 90); Beijing, China
- Father: Wanyan Lixian
- Mother: Aisin-Gioro Henghui
- Religion: Shamanism

Wang Mintong (Chinese: 王敏彤; pinyin: Wáng Mǐntóng; 1913 – February 28, 2003), born Wanyan Tongji, was a Manchu noblewoman who was a member of the Bordered Yellow Banner and a cousin of Wanrong, the Empress of Manchukuo, as their mothers are direct descendants of Emperor Qianlong and members of the Aisin-Gioro clan.

== Early life and Manchukuo ==
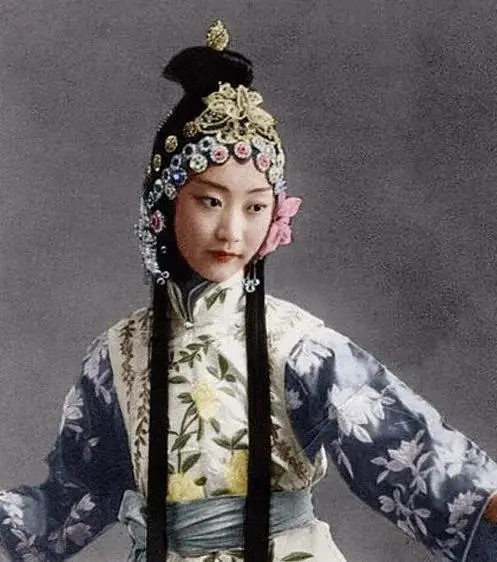
Mintong performing at the Peking Opera

She was born in 1913 in Beijing under the name Wanyan Tongji, however, the nobles of the Eight Banners changed their surnames to Chinese surnames, she also changed her name to Wang Mintong. At a young age she was often kept inside and not invited to important dinners, for fear of her not using proper etiquette. However, she was known to be well mannered.

From Wanrong and Puyi's wedding, Mintong became infatuated with Puyi and spent much of her life trying to win his affection. Her parents had arranged a marriage with another noble, although he had numerous affairs before their wedding, notably with a well-known actress. In an effort to cancel the wedding, Mintong was quoted as saying "If you don't break off the engagement, I'm going to hang myself" to her mother. She was a close friend of actress Meng Xiaodong, who was also her next-door neighbor. Their friendship eventually resulted in Mintong auditioning for the Peking Opera and her starting to learn martial arts.

In 1937, it was announced that Pujie, the younger brother of Puyi, was seeking a wife. Some sources close to Pujie had stated that she was his first choice, but the two never got married as the Japanese Government, which dominated Manchukuo, introduced Pujie to a Japanese woman, Hiro Saga.

== Later life ==
In 1959, when Puyi was given amnesty and released from prison by Mao Zedong, she invited him to her home. After showing him her cooking, he drunkenly joked "How can such a good woman not get married? She must be a good wife and a good mother". Puyi later remarried in 1962 to Li Shuxian, which led Mintong's mental health to spiral. She was seen running and professing her love to Puyi and remained obsessed with him until at least 1967 when Puyi died. In the 1970s, Mintong often took her sword to do morning exercises at the entrance of the Ministry of Culture and was known to despise all men, except for Puyi. However, during the Cultural Revolution, her home was seized and her mother was forced to move into a small home, with them living on less than 300 Yuan a month.

On February 28, 2003, Mintong died after choking on dumplings in her nursing home. At the time of her death, she had a valuable antique collection.
