= The Wandering Princess =

1960 Japanese film

- Theatrical release poster
- Directed by: Kinuyo Tanaka
- Written by: Natto Wada (screenplay); Hiro Saga (book)
- Produced by: Masakazu Nagata
- Starring: Machiko Kyō; Eiji Funakoshi
- Cinematography: Kimio Watanabe
- Music by: Chūji Konoshita
- Production company: Daiei Film
- Distributed by: Daiei Film
- Release date: 27 January 1960 (Japan)
- Running time: 102 minutes
- Country: Japan
- Language: Japanese

The Wandering Princess (Japanese: 流転の王妃, Hepburn: Ruten no ōhi) is a 1960 Japanese drama film directed by Kinuyo Tanaka and starring Machiko Kyō and Eiji Funakoshi. It was written by Natto Wada based on the 1959 memoir of Hiro Saga. It was Tanaka's first film in colour and CinemaScope format.

== Cast ==
- Machiko Kyō as Ryuko (Hiro Saga)
- Eiji Funakoshi as Futetsu (Pujie)
- Yomei Ryu as Fubun (Puyi)
- Sadako Sawamura as Kazuko Sugawara
- Shozo Nanbu as Hidesato Sugawara
- Chieko Higashiyama as Nao Sugawara
- Ryozo Yoshii as Kosuke Takahashi
- Kiyoko Hirai as Tsuruko Takahashi
- Tatsuya Ishiguro as Furuya
- Ken Mitsuda as Asabuki
- Mitsuko Mito as Izumi
- Chishū Ryū as Kinoshita
