= Princess Huisheng =

Chinese princess

Huisheng
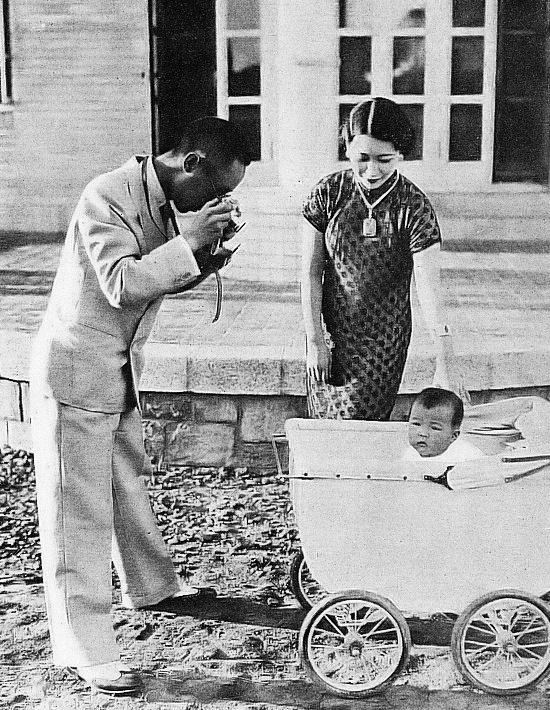
- Huisheng and her parents
- Born: Aisin Gioro Huisheng; 26 February 1938; Xinjing, Manchukuo
- Died: 4 December 1957 (aged 19); Mount Amagi, Japan
- Burial: Shimonoseki, Yamaguchi, Japan
- Partner: Takemichi Ōkubo (1956–1957)
Names
- Aisin-Gioro Huisheng
- House: Aisin Gioro
- Father: Pujie
- Mother: Hiro Saga

Aisin-Gioro Huisheng

Chinese name
- Traditional Chinese: 愛新覺羅·慧生
- Simplified Chinese: 爱新觉罗·慧生
Transcriptions
Standard Mandarin
- Hanyu Pinyin: Àixīnjuéluó Huìshēng

Japanese name
- Kanji: 愛新覚羅·慧生
Transcriptions
- Romanization: Aishinkakura Eisei

Huisheng (26 February 1938 – 4 December 1957), or Eisei, was a Manchu-Japanese noblewoman. She was born in the Aisin Gioro clan, the imperial clan of the Qing dynasty. She was the elder daughter of Pujie, the younger brother of Puyi, the last emperor of China. Her mother was Hiro Saga, a Japanese noblewoman who married Pujie in 1937.

== Life ==
Huisheng was born on 26 February 1938 at Xinjing Special Municipal First Hospital in Xinjing (present-day Changchun, Jilin, China), the capital of Manchukuo to Pujie and Hiro Saga. Her uncle, Puyi, ruled as the puppet emperor of Manchukuo under Japanese control during the Second Sino-Japanese War (1937–1945). Her younger sister was Husheng (嫮生; b. 1940). She lived in Manchukuo until 1943, when she was sent to Japan to live with her maternal grandparents. She was educated in various prestigious private schools, including the Gakushūin. She was very interested in Japanese and Chinese literature.

After the end of the war, Huisheng's father was captured by Soviet forces and held in a prison camp for five years before he was extradited to the People's Republic of China in 1950. He was then incarcerated in the Fushun War Criminals Management Centre. Huisheng's mother and younger sister were also captured and imprisoned in Shanghai before they were repatriated to Japan in 1947. However, even though Huisheng had been reunited with her mother and sister, her father was still imprisoned and out of contact with them. During this time, Huisheng wrote in Chinese to Chinese premier Zhou Enlai, requesting that he put her in touch with her father. Zhou was moved by her letter and granted her permission.

In April 1956, Huisheng was enrolled at the Gakushuin University, in June, she began a relationship with her classmate Takemichi Ōkubo (大久保武道, Ōkubo Takemichi), the son of a railway executive. Later, in February 1957, Huisheng's mother strongly opposed her daughter's decision to marry Ōkubo, either because Ōkubo was a commoner, or because Huisheng had been considered as a potential candidate to marry the then-Crown Prince Akihito.

== Death ==
Huisheng (age 19) and Ōkubo (age 20) disappeared on 4 December 1957 and were later found dead on Mount Amagi in the Izu Peninsula. Huisheng, wearing a golden ring on her finger, lay with her head cradled in Ōkubo's left arm. Ōkubo held a pistol in his right hand. Above their heads was a twisted piece of tissue paper containing snips of their hair and fingernails – an element in the ritual of a Japanese love suicide. This murder-suicide incident was known as the Amagisan shinjū (天城山心中, Love Suicide at Mount Amagi).

At the request of Ōkubo's father, Huisheng and Ōkubo's ashes were interred together first at the Saga family plot in Nison-in, and then at the Aisin-Gioro family plot in Shimonoseki, Yamaguchi.

== Ancestry ==
Ancestors of Princess Huisheng

16. Daoguang Emperor
8. Yixuan
17. Imperial Noble Consort Zhuangshun
4. Zaifeng
18. Deqing (德慶)
9. Liugiya Cuiyan
2. Pujie
20. Changshou (長壽)
10. Ronglu
21. Lady Uja
5. Youlan
22. Linggui (靈桂)
11. Lady Aisin Gioro
23. Lady Sun
1. Huisheng
24. Saga Sanenaru
12. Saga Kinto
25. Tsuru
6. Saga Saneto
26. Nakayama Tadamitsu
13. Nakayama Nakako
3. Saga Hiro
7. Hamaguchi Naoko
