= Consort Xiang =

Consort Xiang may refer to:

- Empress Xiang (1047–1102), wife of Emperor Shenzong of Song
- Fragrant Concubine (fl. 18th century), semi-legendary concubine of the Qianlong Emperor
- Consort Xiang (Daoguang) (1808–1861), concubine of the Daoguang Emperor
- Tan Yuling (1920–1942), concubine of Puyi when he was the emperor of Manchukuo
