= Shuxian =

Shuxian is a toneless pinyin transliteration of multiple Chinese-language given names. Notable people with such a name include:

== Real people ==
=== Given name ===
- Shu Xian of Guan (Chinese: 管叔鮮; died c. 1039 BC), only ruler of the ancient Chinese city-state of Guan
- Guo Shuxian (Chinese: 郭舒贤), aka Ann Kok, Singaporean businesswoman
- Huang Shuxian (Chinese: 黄树贤), Chinese politician
- Li Shuxian (Chinese: 李淑賢; 1924–1997), fifth and last wife of Puyi, the last Qing dynasty emperor
- Xiao Shuxian (Chinese: 萧淑娴), Chinese composer and music educator
- Zhang Shuxian (Chinese: 张殊贤; born 2000), Chinese badminton player

=== Courtesy name ===
- Guo Zhongshu (c. 929–977), courtesy name Shuxian (Chinese: 恕先), Chinese calligrapher, painter, and scholar
- Li Xiu (born 291), courtesy name Shuxian (Chinese: 淑贤), Jin dynasty military commander

== Fictional characters ==
- Ban Shuxian (Chinese: 斑淑嫻), in the wuxia novel The Heaven Sword and Dragon Saber
