= Miai =

Japanese relationship matchmaking

Miai (見合い, "matchmaking"; literally "look meet"), or omiai (お見合い) as it is properly known in Japan with the honorific prefix o-, is a Japanese traditional custom which relates closely to Western matchmaking, in which a woman and a man are introduced to each other to consider the possibility of marriage. The term omiai is sometimes mistranslated as an "arranged marriage" but it can be described as a meeting opportunity with more serious considerations for the future as a process of courtship. According to the National Institute of Population and Social Security Research, in 2005 it was estimated that around 6.2% of marriages in Japan were arranged via omiai.

== History ==
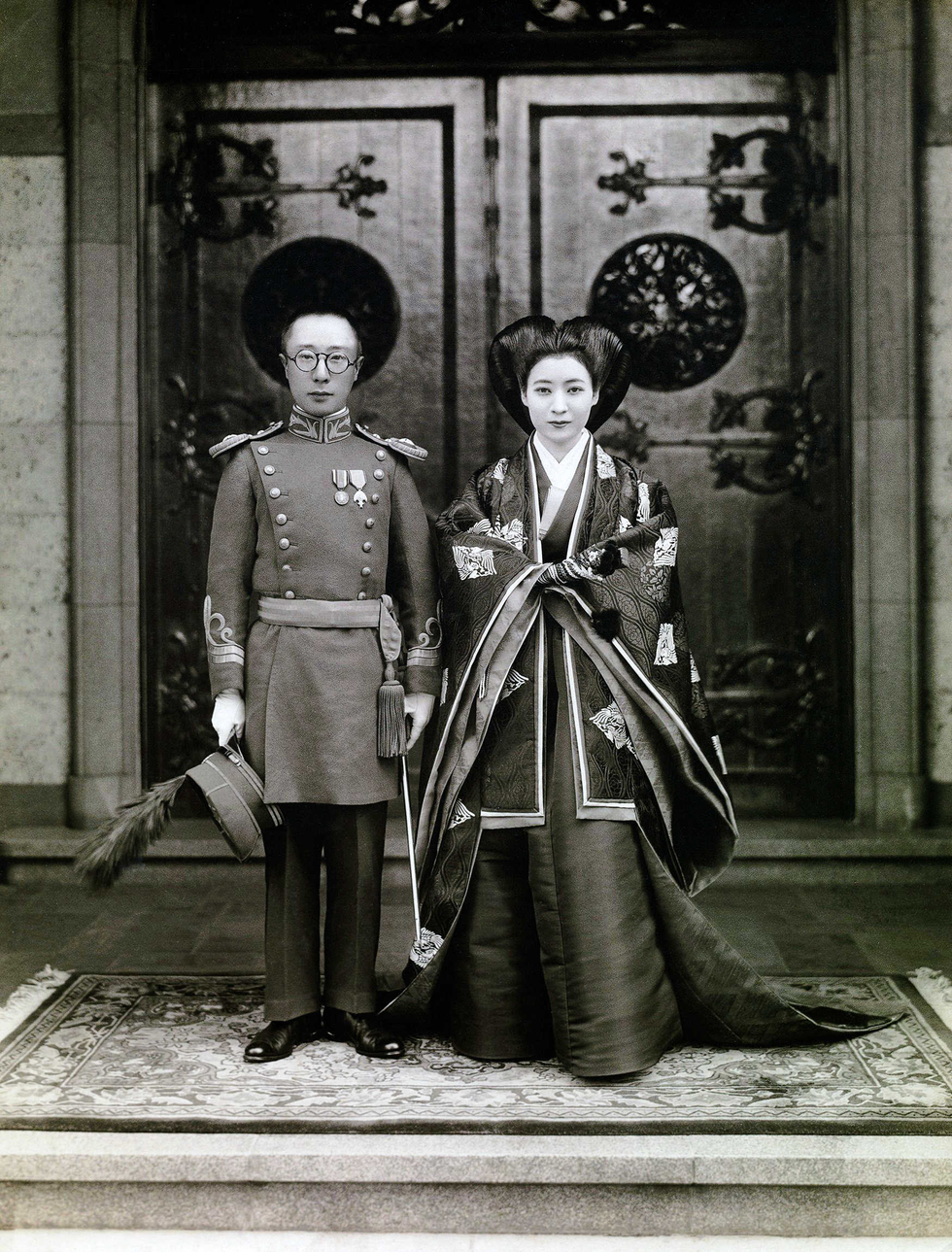
Wedding of Pujie and Hiro Saga in an arranged marriage with a strategic purpose, Tokyo, 1937

The practice of omiai emerged in 16th century Japan among the samurai classes, with the intention to form and protect strong military alliances among warlords to ensure mutual support. Later, during the Tokugawa period (1603–1868), the practice of omiai spread to other urban classes trying to emulate samurai customs. It became the practice for those seeking a union between families, and parents on both sides made all the decisions regarding marriage.

Omiai was a solemn practice and involved considerations that are not given as much weight by most modern Japanese people, such as family bloodlines and class. Nowadays, this type of omiai is usually seen portrayed more in films and television dramas.

After the Pacific War, the trend was to abandon the restrictive arranged-meetings system. In the 1930s and 40s, omiai practices accounted for 69% of marriages in Japan; by 2010 the figure had dropped to 5.2%. Modern forms of omiai are still practiced in Japan today by various marriage agencies; however, practices such as konkatsu or 'spouse hunting' have also emerged as alternatives to omiai for many single people who struggle to find a marriage partner, but might not want to go through a matchmaker. There have also been accounts of how parents pressure their unmarried children into arranged meetings that eventually lead to marriages, particularly with children who would assume family responsibilities such as those inheriting a family business.

In 2014, Japanese prime minister Shinzo Abe set aside ¥3 billion to help with omiai and konkatsu matchmaking efforts within Japan, as part of the Japanese governments efforts to increase the declining birth rate in Japan.

Historically, omiai signified that the parties were brought together expressly for the purpose of marriage on the initiative of the parents, a friend of the family, or a go-between. It also meant that the initial criteria of selection were objective ones. The potential spouse and their family met with the go-between (nakōdo) and examined all eligible persons. The nakōdo often had photographs of candidates and a rirekisho, a small personal history. The rirekisho frequently included the name, age, health, education, occupation and marital status of all members of the candidate's family.

The families then sat down with the nakōdo and screened the portfolios to eliminate any obviously inappropriate candidates. The photographs and rirekisho were then brought to the home of the potential spouse's family for the son or daughter to scrutinize. The participant and their family examined the photos and short personal histories based on an investigation of social consideration. The education level and occupations of the potential candidate's family were historically the first aspects taken into consideration at that meeting. The potential mate and their mother then created a list of primary choices and asked the nakōdo to investigate the first choice.

In more selective omiai, the candidates and their families were judged on a larger set of criteria aimed at determining the suitability and the balance of the marriage. These criteria are formally known in Japan as iegara (家柄). They included level of education, income, occupation, physical attractiveness, religion, social standing, and hobbies. The participant's bloodline (血統, kettō) also played a large role. Many were fearful of the possibility that a potential candidate's blood was contaminated with diseases such as epilepsy, neurosis, or mental illness. The fear was so prevalent that the Eugenic Protection Law of 1948 was passed to legalize sterilization and abortion for people with a history of mental defects and other hereditary diseases. Social status also played a large role in selecting a candidate. Ideally, paired candidates and their families would be of equal social status, so some candidates had a hard time finding a mate if their family was not of a certain social status. Family lineage also affected the quality of candidates historically; for example, a candidate with samurai blood was more likely to be picked than one with ancestry from a different class, especially during the Tokugawa era.

Historically, omiai marriage was criticized for promoting patriarchal relationships with traditional power structures and distinct divisions of labor between males and females.

=== Investigation ===
The nakōdo provided, and still provides, a substantial amount of information regarding each candidate. The family researched the family lineage (iegara) of each candidate provided by the nakōdo once the preliminary list had been constructed. Vast differences in iegara between the two families would be cause of embarrassment when the two sides met. One method of investigation in urban Japan was through a kooshinjo, or detective agency. In rural areas, a common investigative method was to personally ask about the family of interest by questioning shopkeepers and neighbors through kuchikiki ("inquiry of mouth"). More recently, the nakōdo would gather information about the family in question by asking around and comparing responses through kikiawaseru or toriawaseru ("inquire variously and compare"). If all criteria were acceptable, the matchmaker arranged an interview for a omiai.

=== Introduction ===
Before the omiai occurred, the parties scrutinized each other's pictures to prevent future rejection, something which still occurs through online omiai-based services in Japan today. Although candidates rely on their photographs and resumes (rirekisho) in the modern omiai process, an older custom known as kagemi (hidden look) was once employed. Kagemi occurred when a potential male candidate attempted to catch a glimpse of the female in secret. The objective of the kagemi was to prevent embarrassing denials based on appearances. The omiai was, and still is, a casual meeting between the potential couple, though historically the nakōdo and the parents of both parties would be present also. Historically the nakōdo determined the place and format of the meeting.

Historically, the omiai was an opportunity for the parents to survey the bride/groom as well as the couple themselves. The meeting began with an informal introduction between the two families by the nakōdo. The introduction was often followed by small talk between the parents. Occasionally, the conversation shifted to one of the potential candidates. Toward the end of the meeting, the potential couple were often advised to go off to spend some time alone, in order to get better acquainted.

=== Kotowari (excuse, apology, refusal) ===
If the initial omiai introduction was successful, the potential couple went through a series of dates until a decision was reached. The decision was usually expressed at the couple's third meeting. If the potential couple chose to marry, they went through a formal marriage process known as miai kekkon (見合い結婚), in which a betrothal ceremony (結納, yuinō) was arranged by the groom's family. Contrastingly, there were also standard provisions to turn down an offer or proposal with relatively little loss of face for the party being refused.

=== Historical discrimination ===
Historically, there was some amount of racial, class, and genetic discrimination in the omiai process.

Many Japan-born Koreans were discriminated against for being "half-bloods" — i.e. not of full Japanese ancestry. Also, the year of the Horse in the fifth cycle of the Japanese lunar calendar, hinoeuma — every 60th year — were thought to be bad luck. Women born during those years would often claim to have been born in the previous or following year. The belief was so widespread that in 1966, according to the Japan Statistical Yearbook, the birthrate in Japan took a 26% dip.

The most widespread discrimination is against members of the burakumin, the descendants of workers traditionally associated with trades involving blood, death, or uncleanness, such as leather-workers, shoe-menders, and butchers, since shoes were too dirty to be taken into the house, and meat was in the past forbidden by the Buddhist faith. During the Tokugawa shogunate, demotion to burakumin status was sometimes a way of punishing criminals. Today, burakumin members may be identified by the region of the city where they live or by their street address, though it is getting increasingly rare and Japanese people's views on shoes and beef among other things have changed significantly. Historically, a nakōdo would require a candidate to bring a family history to prove that they are not a member of the burakumin.

Members of the Ainu people, an indigenous people from the Hokkaidō region, were commonly avoided as well. Descendants of people who were exposed to the radiation from the atomic bombs dropped on Hiroshima and Nagasaki were also avoided due to perceptions regarding possible child deformities and susceptibilities to rare diseases.

== Modern-day omiai practices ==
=== Participants ===
Today, most omiai processes only involve the potential partners to be married; rarely these days are the families of these candidates involved.

=== Nakōdo ===
A matchmaker (仲人, nakōdo) still serves in the role of go-between for potential marriage partners in the omiai process. Though a nakōdo is not necessary for all omiai, especially with modern omiai parties. The nakōdo can be a family member, friend, or as is most common now, a marriage agency (結婚相談所, kekkonsōdansho).

The general purpose of the nakōdo, especially the traditional way of omiai, is to provide introductions for people entering a new arrangement and to assist candidates. The nakōdo is expected to play a variety of roles throughout the omiai process. The first is the bridging role, hashikake (橋架け), in which the nakōdo introduces potential candidates, and potentially their families to each other depending on requirements. The second role, which is increasingly less common in modern Japan, is as a liaison for the families to avoid direct confrontation and differences in opinions between them by serving as an intermediary for working out the details of the marriage. The nakōdo is even consulted by the married couple after their wedding if they encounter problems in their married life.

Even though omiai marriages are less common than they once were, they do still hold a place in popular media. One example is Wedding Bells, a panel type game show which ran from 1993 to 1997 in Japan on TBS, that substituted for the role of the nakōdo in which contestants were introduced and screened for marriage possibility.

=== Selection process ===
Historically, the initiative for the omiai introductions often came from the parents who felt that their son or daughter was of a marriageable age (tekireiki), usually in the range of 22 to 30, but had shown little or no interest in seeking a partner on their own. Most commonly now, the decision to contact a marriage agency comes directly from the person who seeks a partner, and it is usually due to their lack of opportunity to meet a suitable spouse. Unlike in Western cultures, Japanese people very rarely talk to or trust strangers, thus the nakōdo or marriage agency forms the bridge as a trusted third party. At other times, the individual may ask friends or acquaintances to introduce potential spouses in a similar way.

Sometimes, parents subtly interject the phrase onegai shimasu ("please") into casual conversation, to imply that both parents have consented for their daughter to meet eligible men. The daughter may be unaware that her parents have suggested her availability through the use of "onegai shimasu". In exceptional circumstances, though growing increasingly rare now, some parents send a candidacy picture to a future husband or go-between without their daughter's knowledge or consent. In general now, though, marriage agencies performing omiai duties only discuss introductions and registration with their clients directly, thus removing involvement of parents entirely in many cases.

In Japan, many women are stereotyped as looking for three attributes: height (specifically someone tall), high salary, and high education. This is commonly known as the "Three H's."

== Attitudes ==
Modern attitudes toward omiai have changed significantly. According to an estimate in 1998, between ten and thirty percent of all marriages that took place in Japan at that time were omiai marriages. The National Institute of Population and Social Security Research in 2005 estimated that 6.2% of marriages in Japan were arranged, with younger generations estimated in 1995 to be more likely to pursue marriages preceded by romantic courtship instead. Though the Japanese term for romantic love (ren'ai) implies that there are no constraints against selecting individuals whom one can marry, it is not always possible to classify a particular marriage as "love" or "arranged", as parental influence on potential spouses is present in both omiai and "love" marriages in Japan.

In 1995, women were reported as more inclined to seek a romantic relationship than men, with the inculturation of Western ideals of true love, followed by marital and domestic bliss, at times seen as the cause for the discrepancy. Women in Japan were historically raised with the expectation that they may only find satisfaction within the home as wives and mothers, with later generations more likely to place greater emphasis on the less traditional ideals of romantic love. Despite this, the number of Japanese women pursuing careers and other avenues of fulfillment has increased, resulting in a falling rate of marriages within Japan.

There are several methods for meeting potential spouses that differ from the structure of the omiai. For example, konpa or kompa (companion) is a method young people have adopted into modern society. Konpa occurs when groups of four or five men go out together with the same number of women to see how they all get along. This method has become more popular among university students and younger company workers since it is highly informal and does not involve parents.

== Gender and omiai ==
Although current rates of omiai marriages are fairly low, the persistence of omiai in modern Japanese society comes as a result of challenges in meeting new people. In recent decades, some companies have started offering various services to their employees as ways of helping them find potential partners. These services include marriage counseling and personal introductions, where the employees can join a club that provides guidance and services to match them up with suitable partners.

The idea of the cutoff age is taken quite seriously, with the tendency for women who remain unmarried past tekireiki to be treated as inferior. They are often compared to Japanese Christmas cake: fresh up until the 25th of December but becoming less appetizing with every day past this date. A newer expression replaces Christmas cake with Toshikoshi soba, a dish of noodles to see out the year on the 31st, thus creating motivation for Japanese women after the age of 25 to seek help in the form of omiai introductions from a marriage agency.

Men possess a greater degree of choice and freedom. Previously, a man who was not married by his 30s was considered untrustworthy by colleagues and employers, who believed that such men have not been conditioned to learn the fundamental principles of co-operation and responsibility. For males, marriage also makes an implicit statement about staying in the family business. While previously men who engaged in omiai often occupied dominant roles within the marriage, many of the men now registered with marriage agencies for help in finding a wife through omiai are seeking a balanced, loving relationship with mutual love between partners.

== In literature ==
Omiai is one of the main topics of Jun'ichirō Tanizaki's The Makioka Sisters, which was published in the 1940s.

== See also ==
- Arranged marriage
- Shotgun wedding
- Matrimonial websites
- Matchmaker
- Culture of Japan
