= Hiro Saga =

Japanese noblewoman (1914–1987)

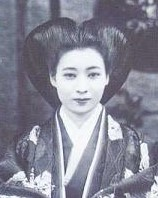
- Hiro Saga in 1937
- Born: 16 April 1914; Tokyo, Japan
- Died: 20 June 1987 (aged 73); Capital Medical University Beijing Friendship Hospital, Beijing, People's Republic of China
- Burial: Shimonoseki, Yamaguchi Prefecture, Japan
- Spouse: Pujie (m. 1937)
- Issue: Huisheng (1938–1957); Husheng (b. 1940)

Hiro Saga (嵯峨 浩, Saga Hiro; 16 April 1914 – 20 June 1987) was a Japanese noblewoman and memoir writer. She was the daughter of Marquis Saneto Saga and a distant relative of Emperor Shōwa. She was married in 1937 to Pujie, the younger brother of Puyi, the last monarch of the Qing dynasty of China between 1908 and 1912 and the ruler of Japanese-backed Manchukuo between 1932 and 1945. After her marriage to Pujie, she was known as, and identified herself as, Aishinkakura Hiro (愛新覺羅•浩) or Aixinjueluo Hao in Chinese.

== Life ==
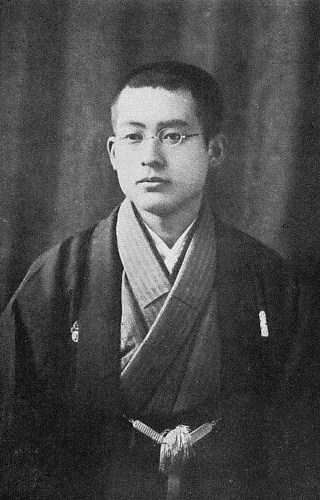
Marquis Saneto Saga, Hiro Saga's father

The Saga family was of the kuge court nobility and a branch of the Ogimachi Sanjo branch (正親町三条家) of the northern Fujiwara lineage, she shared the same great-great-grand father with Emperor Meiji, Ogimichisanjo Sanetomo. Saga was born in Tokyo in 1914 as the eldest daughter of Marquis Saneto Saga (嵯峨実勝, Saga Saneto) and Naoko Hamaguchi (浜口 尚子, Hamaguchi Naoko). She was educated at the women's branch of the Gakushuin Peers' School.

=== Princess ===
In 1936, Saga was introduced to Pujie, the younger brother of Puyi, the ruler of Manchukuo. Pujie was then attending the Imperial Japanese Army Academy. Saga and Pujie were wed in an arranged marriage. Pujie had selected her photograph from a number of possible candidates vetted by the Kwantung Army. As his brother Puyi did not have a direct heir, the wedding had strong political implications, and was aimed at both fortifying relations between the two countries and introducing Japanese blood into the Manchu imperial family.

The engagement ceremony took place at the Manchukuo embassy in Tokyo on 2 February 1937 with the official wedding held in the Imperial Army Hall at Kudanzaka, Tokyo on 3 April. In October, the couple moved to Xinjing, the capital of Manchukuo. They had two daughters, Huisheng and Husheng, and what appeared to be a happy marriage.

=== Later life ===
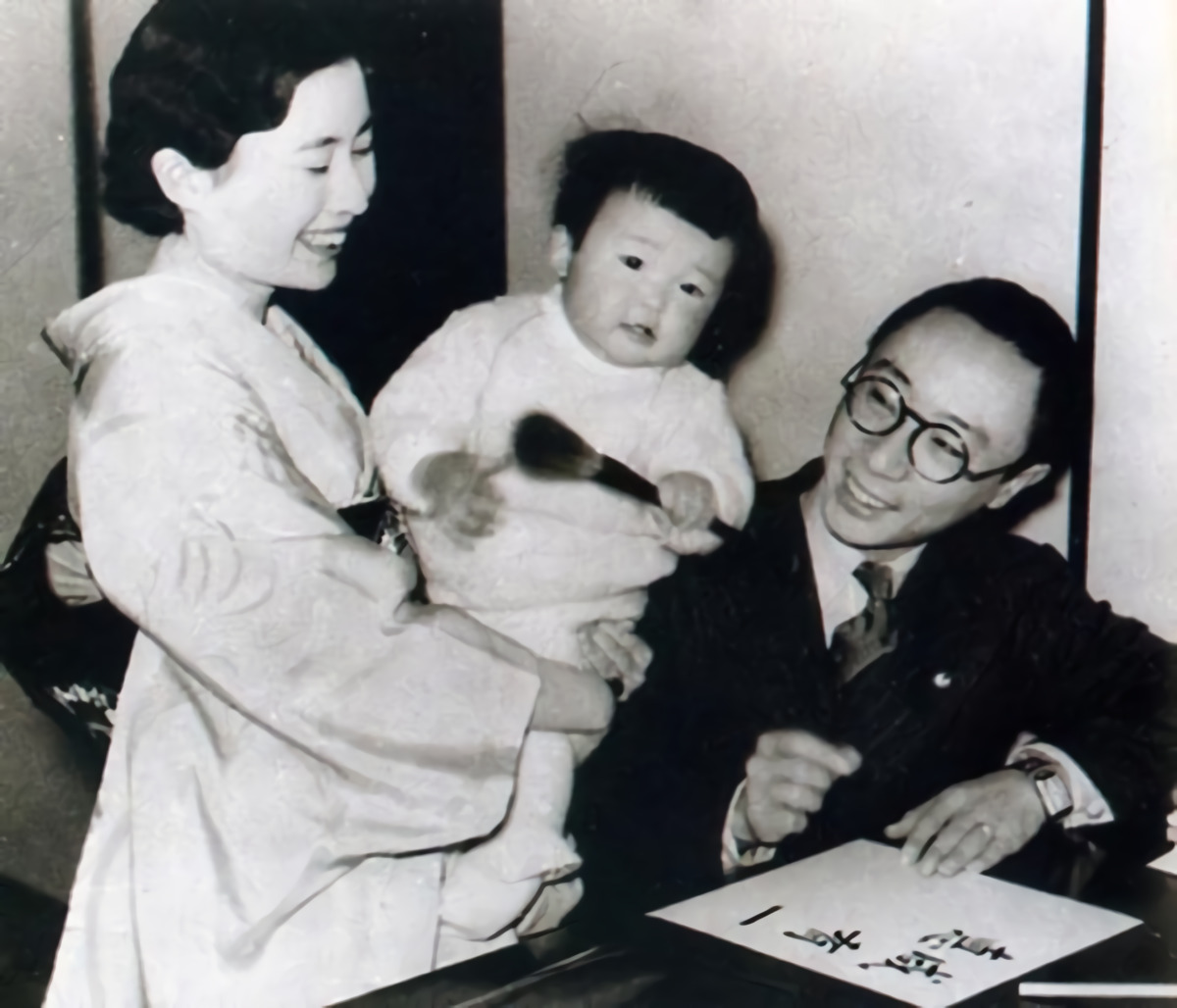
Hiro Saga and Pujie with their daughter

During the Evacuation of Manchukuo during the Soviet invasion of Manchuria, Saga was separated from her husband. While Pujie accompanied Puyi in an attempt to escape by air, Saga and her younger daughter Husheng were sent by train towards Korea together with Wanrong (Puyi's wife). The train was captured by Chinese communist forces at the town of Dalizi, now in Linjiang, Jilin, in January 1946. In April, they were moved to a police station in Changchun, eventually released only to be rounded up again and locked up at a police station in Jilin in the north. When Kuomintang forces bombed Jilin, the prisoners were moved to a prison in Yanji. Saga and her daughter were then taken to a prison in Shanghai and eventually repatriated to Japan. In 1961, after the release of Pujie from prison, the couple was reunited with permission from Chinese premier Zhou Enlai. They lived in Beijing from 1961 until her death in 1987.

Saga and Pujie are buried in an Aisin-Gioro family plot in Shimonoseki, Yamaguchi, with their eldest daughter, Huisheng.

== Descendants ==
Hiro Saga and Pujie had two daughters: Huisheng and Husheng. Huisheng was born in Xinjing and educated in Gakushuin University. She died at Mount Amagi on 10 December 1957 in what appeared to be a murder-suicide case. Husheng was educated in Gakushuin Women's University in Tokyo. She married Kenji Fukunaga (福永健治 Fukunaga Kenji) in 1968 and had five children with him.

== Memoirs ==
Hiro Saga published her memoir, Vicissitudes of a Princess, in 1959. It became a hugely popular bestseller of the time, and in 1960 was adapted into a film, The Wandering Princess, by director Kinuyo Tanaka.

== Portrayals in the media ==
Saga is a minor character in the Academy Award-winning 1987 film The Last Emperor, where she is played by Chinese actress Cheng Shuyan.

In 1960, Kinuyo Tanaka produced and directed The Wandering Princess (流転の王妃, Ruten no Ōhi), a film adapted from Hiro Saga’s memoirs published in 1959, with Machiko Kyō and Eiji Funakoshi in the roles of Hiro Saga and Pujie.

Pujie and Hiro Saga's story was adapted into a television drama, Ruten no Ōhi - Saigo no Kōtei (流転の王妃・最後の皇弟), shown on TV Asahi in 2003. Takako Tokiwa, who portrayed Hiro Saga in the drama, was a classmate of Saga's grandson (Husheng's son) in real life.
