= Evacuation of Manchukuo =

1945 Soviet invasion in Northeast China

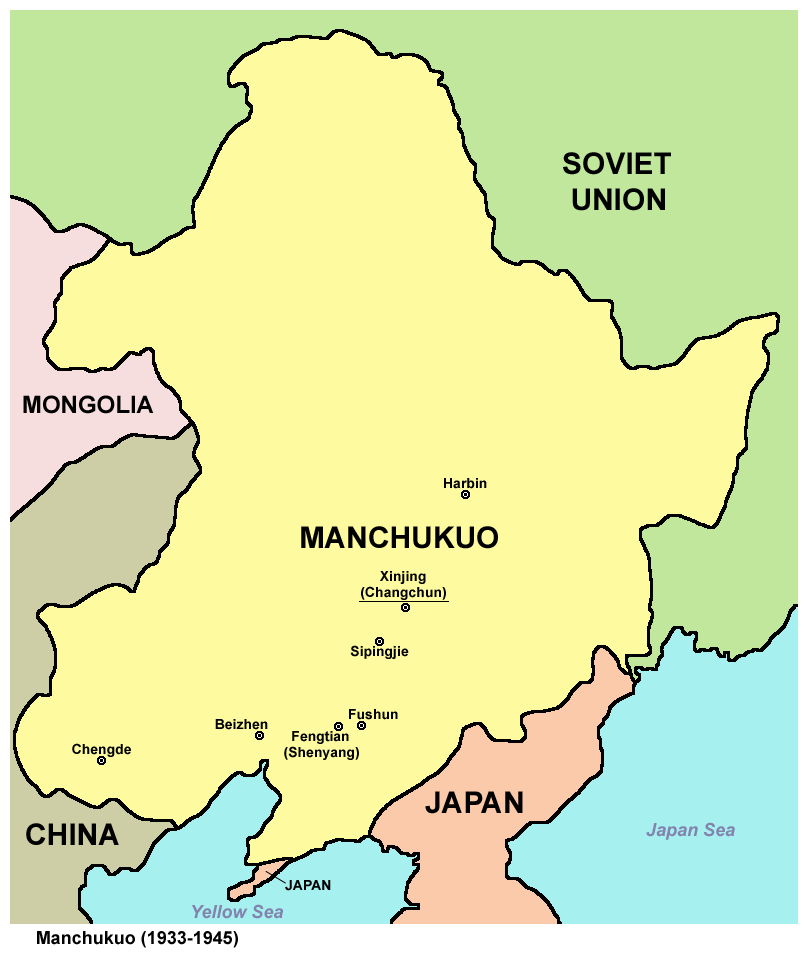
Map of Manchukuo.

The evacuation of the Japanese puppet state of Manchukuo occurred during the Soviet invasion of Manchuria in August 1945, part of the last phase of World War II.

The Soviets recovered territory which had been captured by Japan during the Russo-Japanese War of 1904–1905, and they dismantled the Manchurian industrial infrastructure. This deprived Chiang Kai-shek's troops of a vital region of China, and gave Mao Zedong's Eighth Army the opportunity to establish bases in North East China.

== Kwantung Army strength ==
On August 10, 1945, troops of the 17th Japanese Front (in Korea) and the Fifth Air Army were placed under the command of the Kwantung Army. At this point, the Japanese Kwantung Army numbered nearly 750,000 officers and men. It had 1,155 tanks and self-propelled guns, 1,800 warplanes, and 30 warships and gunboats. The entire Japanese force deployed in Manchuria, Inner Mongolia, and Korea numbered over one million officers and men.

== Soviet military operations in Manchukuo and Korea ==
The Soviet Army possessed 1.7 times more Infantry, 4.5 times more armor, and 2.8 times more aircraft than the Japanese. On the sea theater, Soviet naval forces, unlike Japan, had no aircraft carriers and battleships. However, the chances of those vessels appearing in the Gulf of Korea or the Japan Sea were low, since Soviet air domination was complete. The Japanese Kwantung Army, stationed in Manchuria since 1931, was the first to meet the Soviet offensive. In 1945, this army consisted of 713,000 men, of whom, according to the Japanese sources, about half were poorly trained teenaged recruits and old men, since the more experienced troops had already been sent long ago to fight the Allied forces in China and the Pacific. The Soviets, on the other hand, hand-picked their best formations from the war in Europe based on their experience against certain types of terrain and enemy defenses. The Japanese troops had almost no fuel and as a result, during the ensuing battle with the Soviets not a single plane out of a fleet of 900 was able to take off, and all 600 Japanese tanks were seized by the Soviets before they were even used.

On August 9, 1945, the Soviet Army began the Sungari Offensive. The Amur Flotilla assisted troops of the second Far Eastern Front in routing the Japanese Kwantung Army. Having crossed the Amur and Ussuri rivers with the help of the Amur Flotilla, troops from two Soviet armies and an infantry corps captured two river bridgeheads.

The Japanese army used a variety of field artillery in an attempt to stop the Red Army, but had very limited ammunition available at the front line and failed to achieve significant results against the Soviet infantry and armor pouring in from the Soviet Far East and Mongolia into Manchuria and Mengjiang.

At the same time and with gunboat support a Soviet landing party entered Fuyuan and quickly took the city. The First Brigade of river gunboats from the Amur Flotilla, having swept shipping channels, entered the estuary of the river Sungari to support the troops as they landed with artillery fire. On August 10, Soviet forces captured the Sungari Fortified District and the Tuntsiang defense center. It was here that the crew of the gunboat Sun Yatsen distinguished itself.

When Soviet forces took the Fuqing Fortified District, the gunboat, acting jointly with a detachment of armoured launches, destroyed five permanent emplacements, a munitions depot and six mortar batteries with precise artillery. At the same time, the Sun Yatsen transferred landing parties across the river and supported their land operations with artillery fire.

On August 18, troops of the 15th Army captured the Sun’u Fortified District and Sun’u City and took 20,000 Japanese officers and soldiers prisoner. On August 19, Soviet ground troops and Amur Flotilla sailors captured Sanxingdui. On August 20, in Harbin, after combat action captured by Soviet paratroopers, the first and second Amur Flotilla Brigades accepted the capitulation of Japan's Sungari Flotilla only.

Soviet air superiority was virtually total. On one occasion, Red Army pilot Jr. Lt. Miroshnichenko of the 17 IAP flying the P-63 Kingcobra shot down a Ki-43 or Ki-27 fighter while operating on the Transbaikal Front out of Mongolia. If any Japanese Army planes attempted to take off from their airdromes, Russian fighters almost instantly shot them down. Not a single plane out of a fleet of 900 was able to take off due to fuel shortages after the crushing raids of Soviet Air Force and Soviet Naval Air Service aviators on Japanese land bases and ports in Manchurian and Korean coasts. Only certain units such as the 90th Air Regiment of the 5th Air Army (based in Hebei, north China) equipped with Kawasaki Ki-48s was one of the few Japanese air units in northern China to engage the Red Army over Manchuria, although others were advanced in preparation. The air unit flew 20 sorties against the Soviets during 14 August 1945.

Paratroopers formed from crews of warships and coastal units of the Pacific Fleet landed in Ryojun and Dalian. On August 25, 17 GST seaplanes which had flown five hours from Sukhodol airport near Vladivostok landed in the Ryojun inlet with landing parties made up of Pacific seamen. On the same day, Japanese garrisons in Ryojun and Dalian laid down their arms, and the Russian Pacific navy hoisted the Soviet naval ensign over Ryojun fortress.

It was the Soviet Pacific Fleet's aviation group that opened hostilities by delivering heavy strikes against the Japanese-controlled Korean ports of Yuki, Rashin and Seishin, which served as the Japanese naval bases in North Korea. These naval air arm flew a total of 474 sorties and lost 57 aircraft, 37 to enemy action, and 55 men - 23 pilots and 32 crew members. As a result of Soviet airstrikes, Japan's sea communications were cut during the first days of the war.

Between these strikes came the next operations: in a torpedo strike, Major G. D. Popovich flew an Il-4 twin-motor torpedo bomber of the 4 MTAP and sank the only Japanese naval vessel lost during the campaign, a 740-ton "Type D escort Frigate", hull number 82 (top speed 17.5kts, 2 120mm & 6 25mm guns). The Escort Vessel Type "D" Kaibokan (Escort frigate) (IJN Escort CD-82) was commanded by Reserve Lt Mori Takeshi and arrived at Genzan (now Wonsan), Korea at 6 August 1945. Between the first missions, the CD-82 departed Genzan to rescue the survivors from the 5462-ton Rashin Maru, torpedoed by USS Pargo (SS-264). During August 9, 1945, CD-82's observers saw two twin-engine Ilyushin Il-4T torpedo bombers, flying near the north east Korean coast. The escort arrived at the scene of Rashin Maru's sinking but no survivors were found. The CD-82 was suddenly targeted by two torpedo bombers from the 49th MTAP which attempted an "anvil attack". Each of the bombers carried one 45-cm (970-kg) aerial torpedo (45-36AN), but failed in the strike against Japanese vessel. At 1300, Lt Cdr Mori canceled the search for survives and ordered the vessel to return to Genzan. After their return, the crew of CD-82 was finally informed about the outbreak of war with the Soviet Union. The escort made an overnight stop in Orang Bay, south of Chongjin.

The next day, 10 August 1945, the Kaibokan CD-82 departed Orang Bay. Lt Cdr Mori received the order to leave Rashin and escort all disposable transports to Genzan. At the same time, she sighted 6886-ton freighter Mukahi Maru which was beached in shallow water off the Korean coast after escaping from Rashin. CD-82 took the ship in tow and managed to pull it free at high tide. After learning that Rashin was under attack of the Soviet bombers, Lt Cdr Mori order the small convoy to head for Genzan. The CD-82 and Mukahi Maru were again unsuccessfully attacked by a flight of Soviet torpedo bombers while underway. Expecting new attacks, Lt Cdr Mori ordered Mukahi Maru to proceed to Genzan independently.

While the vessels were en route in the Sea of Japan, 7 miles SSW of Kumsudan, North Korea, they were spotted by a trio of Soviet Il-4T torpedo-bombers from the 49th MTAP. This squadron was on an armed reconnaissance flight led by the Regiment's XO, Major Grigori D. Popovich, based from Romanovka airfield near Vladivostok, Siberia. Maj Popovich and his wingmen attacked, but CD-82's 25-mm AA gunners shot down both planes; their torpedoes missed the ships. 2/Lt Gromakov and his two crewmen were killed, but 1/Lt Lazarev managed to ditch his plane. He and his crew swam safely ashore. Popovich, targeting the kaibokan, made a perfect approach. His navigator dropped their torpedo which hit the target in the stern. The ensuing explosion detonated her depth charges and in a few seconds CD-82 sank by the stern at 41-21N, 131-12E. The captain of Mukahi Maru decided to return to find survivors from CD-82, but twenty minutes later his vessel was attacked by a flight of three Ilyushin torpedo bombers from the same unit. All three torpedoes passed beneath the hull of the freighter.

Later the Japanese freighter returned to the scene of attack and found up 93 survivors, including the CO of Kaibokan. 117 hands were lost. Mukahi Maru arrived at Songjin port (now Kimchaek) in North Korea early in the morning on 17 August 1945 where the survivors of CD-82 were debarked.

The Soviet Navy of the Pacific between August 10–24 made the following actions: Japanese merchant Riuko Maru n°2 was captured by a group of Border Guard patrol boats near the mouth of river Vorovskaya. 405 POW were taken and the guard ship (torpedo boat) Metel sank a Japanese motor-sailing vessel with gunfire close to Seisin (today Chonjin, North Korea). The vessel appeared to have been on a mission to deliver reinforcements to the enemy garrison. Patrol boat PK-31 (MO-4 class, manned by NKVD) shelled a Japanese schooner and forced it to run aground close to Maoka (Shakalin island). The torpedo boat Metel captured the abandoned Japanese tanker Horai Maru n°14 (834 GRT), previously damaged by aircraft and grounded on 10 August. Japanese military losses included only the large auxiliary gunship (Shinko Maru n°2) that was damaged. The other victims were 3 units: a merchant, a cable-layer, and a motorboat sunk. A Soviet auxiliary minesweeper Tszcz-155 captured a Japanese schooner in Kurili islands.

On August 10, 1945, Junior Lieutenant Korshunov of the 50 OMRAP, flying a Yak-9 encountered and shot down a Kawanishi H6K Mavis over Rashin (later Najin) in the northeastern-most corner of Korea. On August 15, 1945, at 13:30 hours, 29 Pe-2 dive bombers of the 55 BAP bombed the railroad station at Ranan (later Nanam). A pair of Mitsubishi J2M fighters tried to intervene and an escorting Yak-9 of the 19 IAP shot down one of them while the other escaped. At 17:18 hours that same day, 34 Pe-2s of the 33 BAP, again escorted by the Yak-9s of the 19 IAP, attacked the station at Funei (late Nuren). Despite token opposition, a J2M was shot down; this time the pilot was identified as a Lieutenant Grib.

Soon after effective raids by Soviet aviators on Japanese bases, Pacific Fleet Commander Admiral I. S. Yumashev decided, by agreement with Marshal A. M. Vasilevsky, to make landings in Yuki, Rashin, and Seishin. On the eve of the operation, naval bombers and attack planes continued to attack those ports. At the same time, the ports were attacked from the sea by torpedo boats led by division commanders Captain K. V. Kazachinsky, Captain S. P. Kostritsky, and Lieutenant-Captain M. G. Malik. The sea and air attacks seriously weakened the defenses of the three cities, causing the Japanese to lose as many as twenty transports and other vessels.

The purpose of the Seishin Landing Operation, achieved during the first days of the war, was to capture the Japanese naval base in order to deprive the enemy of the ability to transport reinforcements, equipment, and ammunition from Japan, and also to prevent the evacuation of troops and equipment to the Japanese home islands. Seishin was a fortified district with 4,000 officers and men, protected from the sea by coastal artillery. The Pacific Fleet's intention was to make a sudden landing to capture the port's moorage line and reconnoiter enemy forces. It was planned to subsequently land the main forces, occupy the city and hold it until the arrival of the 25th Soviet Army's troops advancing along the coastline.

The main landing force included the 355th Separate Marine Battalion under Major M. Barabolko (1st echelon), the 13th Marine Brigade under Major-General V. P. Trushin (2nd echelon) and the 335th Infantry Division (3rd echelon). The destroyer Voikov, mine-layer Argun, eight coast guards, seven minesweepers, twenty-four torpedo boats, twelve landing vessels and seven transports were involved. The air protection and landing support group had 188 bombers and 73 fighters — almost seven air regiments. Major-General Trushin was in command of the entire operation with Captain A. F Studenchikov leading the landing party.

At 0700 hours on August 13, after the Pacific Fleet air force had finished bombing enemy defense structures in Seishin, six torpedo boats led by Lieutenant-Captain Markovsky sailed to Seishin. These boats came with a scout detachment under Senior Lieutenant V. N. Leonov, and a company of submachine gunners under Senior Lieutenant I. M. Yarotsky from Inlet Novik (Russky Island). As the vanguard of this landing party advanced along the streets of Seishin, Japanese resistance became fiercer. The sailors advanced slowly while engaged with the enemy in hand-to-hand fighting. On the morning of August 14, fighters of the first echelon landed in Seishin, with the second echelon landing on August 15. There was no need to land the third echelon, since the six thousand sailors who had already entered Seishin were sufficient to capture the city. By the afternoon of August 16, the sailors, cooperating with the 393rd Infantry Division of the 25th Soviet Army, had captured the city.

The success of the landing was largely possible thanks to the effective support provided by warships and naval aviation. The destroyer Voikov, the minelayer Argun and other warships opened fire against the enemy sixty-five times. The coast guard vessel Metel under Lieutenant-Captain L. N. Baliakin provided support to the landing party by shooting down an enemy plane. Metel's artillery also destroyed an armoured train carrying combat equipment, a Japanese coastal battery, and eight enemy concrete fortifications and emplacements.

In the Battle of Seishin, the Japanese lost more than 3,000 officers and men and a large quantity of armaments and equipment. Hundreds of Soviet officers and men were awarded orders and medals.

After taking Seishin, Pacific Fleet sailors under the command of Studenchikov captured two more major strongholds: the ports of Odetsin and Genzan, where 6,238 Japanese officers and men were taken prisoner.

One particular case was the action sustained by the Japanese against Soviets in Kotou Fortress, as part of Japanese Army Frontier Fortified Districts, located near Ussuri River in the Soviet-Manchurian border. It was one of the strongest fortress in Manchukuo, among eight other Japanese fortresses in Russian-Manchu frontier.

Your detachment as the 15th Border Guard Unit, same unit are special artillery unit also conformed by 1st Battery (with 5 howitzers and operators), 2nd Battery (with 6 heavy cannons and 2 field guns with personnel), 3rd Battalion (Type 88 75mm AA Guns with operators), 13th Battery (Type 90 24 cm Railway Gun and personnel) and 14th Battery (Experimental 41 cm Howitzer and operators); all unit under lead in time by Captain Ohki.

During July 1945 the 15th Border Guard Unit was created and commissioned for the garrison of the Kotou Fortress. When the Soviets irrupted over Manchukuo in Aug., 1945, stayed ones 1,400 units in place. Although the Soviets announced the surrender of Japan, Japanese garrisons did not believe this. They decided to continued to fight until the last man.

Such gun fired and destroyed a railway bridge of the Trans-Siberian Railroad. Then, it fired with over 100 rounds during about one week until it was overrun by Red Army. In the same action, the Type 90 24 cm Railway Gun was moved to other positions for best firing against Russians. It was destroyed by Soviet artillery and abandoned heavily damaged by Japanese in area. The battle for Kotou Fortress ended on August 26; at same time Japanese forces in others frontier posts used Type 45 24 cm Howitzers against the Soviets which invaded Manchukuo in that period.

During the Soviet invasion of Manchuria the Russian unit Asano detachment among other units took part in fighting with Japanese forces against the Red Army. The fate of those who fell into Soviet captivity is unknown.

In Manchukuo and other parts of Northern China, SMERSH and other special Soviet units used new tactics. Groups of SMERSH operatives were parachuted in to Xinjing (Changchun), Mukden (Shenyang), Ryojun (Lüshunkou), and Dalian. These groups consisted mostly of SMERSH officers, followed by a landing force and additional forces bearing a flag of truce. In Xinjing, on August 19 a group of SMERSH operatives and truce forces compelled General Otozo Yamada to order the surrender of his Kwantung Army. During this short campaign in Manchuria, officers Babich and Misyurev personally led two raids conducted by a group of SMERSH operatives. On September 21, 1945, Aleksandr Vadis reported to commander Babich:

From August 9 to September 18, there were 35 operational-search SMERSH groups in Manchuria. They conducted operations along with stormtroopers, taking over cities, especially those in which, according to our intelligence information, there were enemy intelligence and counterintelligence organs.

== The fate of Manchukuo ==
On August 9, Kwantung Army supreme commander, General Otozō Yamada, informed Puyi that the Soviet Union had violated the Soviet–Japanese Neutrality Pact and had invaded across the Manchukuo frontier. Although assured by General Yamada that the situation was under control, the same day Xinjing was attacked by the first air raid of the war, and Puyi witnessed explosions from bombs falling near the Wei Huang Gong palace.

On August 10, General Yamada advised Puyi that although the Army was "giving heavy resistance" the capital was being temporarily evacuated to Tonghua. Puyi was reluctant to abandon Xinjing, but was warned that if he did not leave, he would be the first killed by Red Army troops. Puyi donned the uniform of Commander in Chief of the Manchukuo Imperial Army as a gesture of solidarity with his troops.

On August 11, Puyi and other members of the imperial court departed Xinjing by train. Hiro Saga witnessed the local population preparing to receive the Red Army by making hammer and sickle flags. Because of the rapid Soviet advance, the entourage was unable to reach Tonghua, and changed its route to Talitzou, arriving at night. On the way, they witnessed Japanese military convoys fleeing south, in contrast to General Yamada's assurances that "the Japanese army are gaining and destroyed many aircraft and enemy tanks". Talitzou station was a scene of panic, with civilians desperately attempting to board the overcrowded last trains "crying and bribing guards to let them enter and between guards there were fights."

At the same time, the Japanese authorities took care of the safety of the Bureau of Russian Emigrant Affairs employees. On August 13, a special train with BREM members left Harbin, but the next day the train turned around to Mukden, as the road to Korea was already closed.

At Talitzou, Puyi and his court stayed in a two-storey administrative building belonging to a mining company. Puyi talked with his Japanese advisors about his future, and plans were made to take him to Korea, which the Allies had yet to invade, and from there to Japan. Puyi was uncertain where he would like to stay, but settled upon Kyoto.

On August 15, the group met around a radio receiver, listening to Japanese emperor Hirohito announcing the unconditional surrender of Japan. Pujie translated the speech for the group. Hiro mentioned how both brothers shook hands and cried.

Two days later, on August 17, Puyi formally renounced the Manchukuo throne and proclaimed the dissolution of the Manchukuo government. In a symbolic vote, all present approved, and Puyi stamped his seal to enact the law, ending the Manchukuo government after 13 years and five months. Coincidentally, it was at Talitzou 350 years before that Puyi's ancestor Nurhaci began his campaign to defeat the Ming Dynasty.

The region was no longer safe due to Communist guerrillas, and the group divided; one part returned to Xinjing with ex-prime minister Zhang Jinghui for a last radio contact with Chiang Kai-shek, in an unsuccessful attempt to give over control of Manchukuo to the Kuomintang to prevent Soviet occupation. The women in the entourage were sent separately by train towards Korea, as it was thought that they were not in immediate danger, and were not political targets of the Soviet or Chinese forces. As the train left Hiro saw Puyi cry.

At Talitzou airport a Tachikawa Ki-54, was prepared for Puyi's escape. Puyi selected only eight people, including his brother Pujie, Yuyan, Big Li and his personal medic. The small plane took the imperial entourage to Mukden where a larger plane, one Mitsubishi Ki-57 was to take them to Korea. However, while waiting at Mukden, Soviet troops of the Transbaikal Front seized the airport, disarming the small Japanese garrison.

After Germany's capitulation, Heinrich Samoilovich Lyushkov was transferred from Tokyo on 20 July 1945 to work for the Japanese Kwantung Army's Special Intelligence authorities in Manchukuo. On 9 August 1945, the Soviet invasion of Manchuria commenced and Lyushkov vanished in the confusion of the assault, where he was reportedly last seen in a crowd at a Dalian train station. He was apparently invited to the head of the Dalian military mission, Yutaka Takeoka, who suggested that he commit suicide. Lyushkov refused and was shot by Takeoka. His body was secretly cremated (three days later, Dalian was occupied by the Soviet army).

Puyi and his companions spent the night at the airport under guard, and the next morning were taken aboard a Russian plane. Between Mukden and Khabarovsk the plane landed for refueling, where Puyi spoke to the Soviet commander, telling him that he "did not like being in the same airplane with Japanese war criminals" and the Japanese were left at the airfield while Puyi continued on. On reaching Khabarovsk, Puyi was first sent to a hotel which was transformed into a detention centre. Later, he was sent to "Detention Center N°45" in a school building in the same city.

With the fall of Manchukuo to Soviet forces during the invasion of Manchuria in 1945, the head of Manchukuo Film Industry, Masahiko Amakasu committed suicide by taking potassium cyanide. On the last day of his life, Amakasu stayed calm, paid out the wages owed to his staff who were advised to leave Xinjing at once, wrote a suicide note in his office, and swallowed a cyanide pill.

== See also ==
- World War II evacuation and expulsion
- Evacuation of East Prussia
- Japanese repatriation from Huludao
- Japanese evacuation of Karafuto and the Kuril Islands
