= Pujie =

Aisin-Gioro imperial prince (1907–1994)

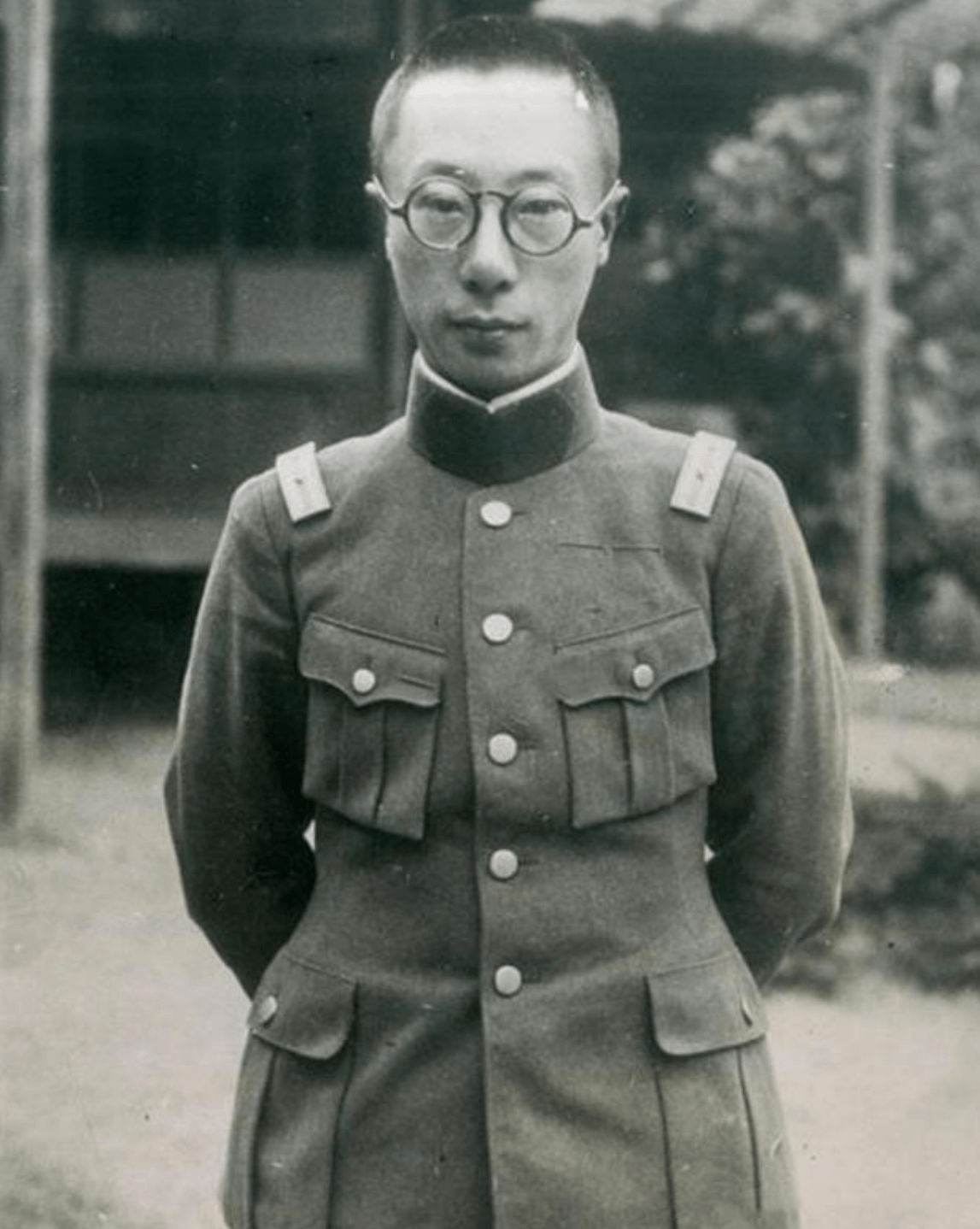
- Pujie wearing military dress, c. 1930-1940

Head of the House of Aisin-Gioro
- Period: 17 October 1967 – 28 February 1994
- Predecessor: Puyi
- Successor: Jin Youzhi
- Born: 16 April 1907; Prince Chun Mansion, Peking, China
- Died: 28 February 1994 (aged 86); Beijing, China
- Burial: Nagayama Shrine, Shimonoseki, Yamaguchi Prefecture, Japan; Beijing, China
- Consorts: Tang Shixia (m. 1924; div. 1928) Hiro Saga (m. 1937; died 1987)
- Issue: Huisheng; Husheng
Names
- Aisin-Gioro Pujie (愛新覺羅 溥傑)
- House: Aisin-Gioro
- Father: Zaifeng, Prince Chun
- Mother: Youlan
- Military career
- Allegiance: Manchukuo
- Branch: Manchukuo Imperial Army
- Service years: 1935–1945
- Rank: Lieutenant colonel
- Unit: Manchukuo Imperial Guards

Pujie

Chinese name
- Traditional Chinese: 溥傑
- Simplified Chinese: 溥杰
Transcriptions
Standard Mandarin
- Hanyu Pinyin: Pǔjié
- Bopomofo: ㄆㄨˇ ㄐㄧㄝˊ
- Wade–Giles: P'u³-chieh²
- Tongyong Pinyin: Pǔ-jié
- IPA: [pʰù.tɕjě]

Junzhi (courtesy name)
- Chinese: 俊之
Transcriptions
Standard Mandarin
- Hanyu Pinyin: Jùnzhī
- Bopomofo: ㄐㄩㄣˋ ㄓ
- Wade–Giles: Chün⁴-chih¹
- Tongyong Pinyin: Jyùn-jhih
- IPA: [tɕŷn.ʈʂɻ̩́]

Bingfan (art name)
- Chinese: 秉藩
Transcriptions
Standard Mandarin
- Hanyu Pinyin: Bǐngfān
- Bopomofo: ㄅㄧㄥˇ ㄈㄢ
- Wade–Giles: Ping³-fan¹
- Tongyong Pinyin: Bǐng-fan
- IPA: [pìŋ.fán]

Japanese name
- Kanji: 溥傑
- Hiragana: ふけつ
- Katakana: フケツ
Transcriptions
- Kunrei-shiki: Huketu

Pujie (Chinese: 溥傑; 16 April 1907 – 28 February 1994) was a Qing dynasty imperial prince of the Aisin-Gioro. Pujie was the younger brother of Puyi, the last Emperor of China. After the fall of the Qing dynasty, Pujie went to Japan, where he was educated and married to Hiro Saga, a Japanese noblewoman. In 1937, he moved to Manchukuo, where his brother ruled as Emperor under varying degrees of Japanese control during the Second Sino-Japanese War (1937–1945). After the war ended, Pujie was captured by Red Army, held in Soviet prison camps for five years, and then extradited back to the People's Republic of China, where he was incarcerated for about 10 years in the Fushun War Criminals Management Centre. He was later pardoned and released from prison by the Chinese government, after which he remained in Beijing where he joined the Communist Party and served in a number of positions in the party until his death in 1994.

== Names ==
Pujie's Manchu name was ᡦᡠ ᡤᡳᠶᡝ; Pu-giye, his courtesy name Junzhi, and his art name Bingfan. Zeng Guofan was a source of inspiration for Pujie's art name, Bingfan. Bingfan means "live up to (the legacy of Zeng Guo)fan".

== Early life ==
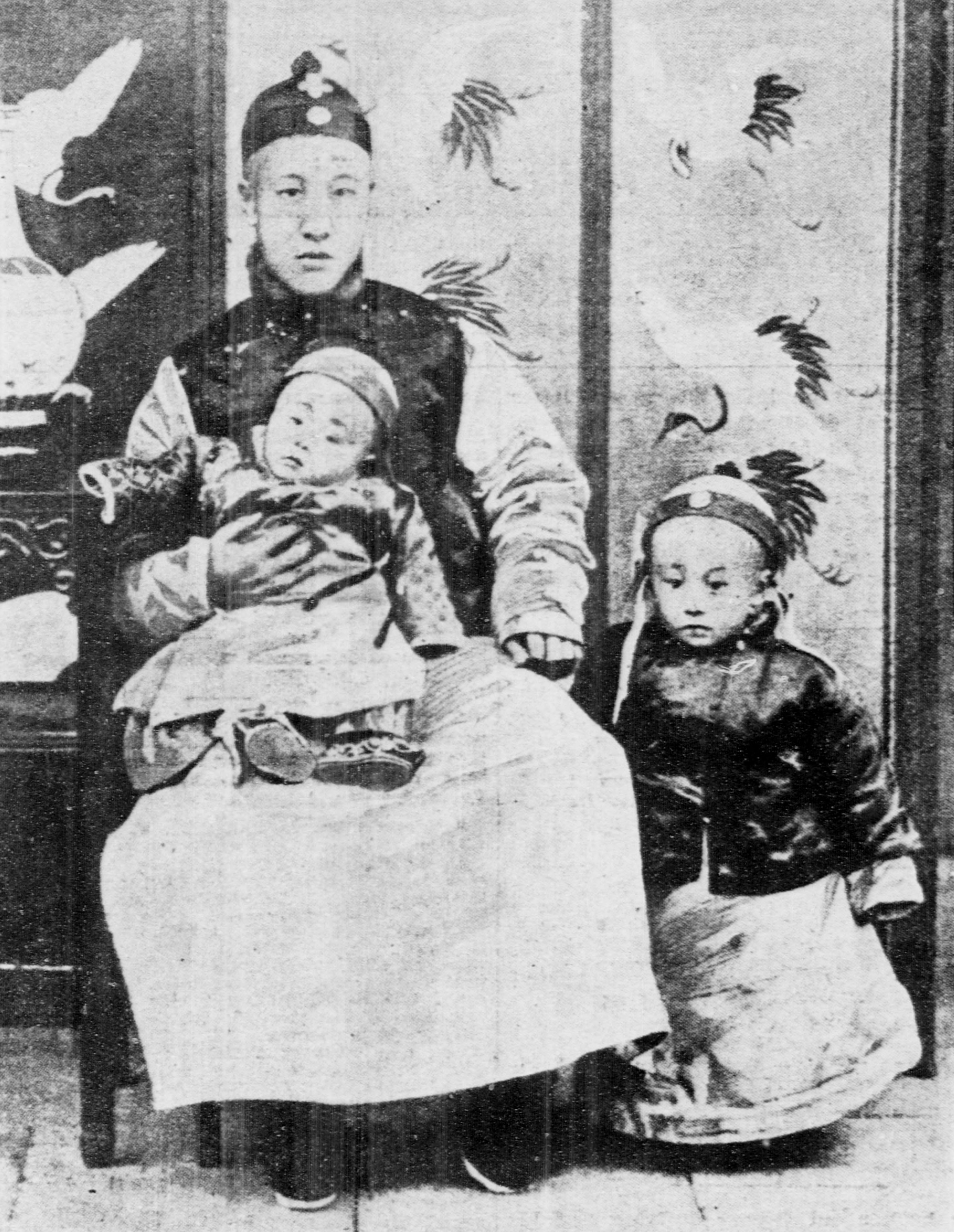
Pujie, held by his father Prince Chun (left), and his older brother, Puyi (right).

Pujie was the second son of Zaifeng (Prince Chun) and his primary consort, Youlan. As a child, he was brought to the Forbidden City in Beijing to be a playmate and classmate to his brother, Puyi. A well-known incident recounted how Puyi threw a tantrum when he saw that the inner lining of one of Pujie's coats was yellow, because yellow was traditionally a colour reserved only for the emperor.

In 1929, Pujie travelled to Japan and was educated in the Gakushūin Peers' School. He became fluent in Japanese. Later, he enrolled at the Imperial Japanese Army Academy and graduated in July 1935.

Pujie was first married in 1924 to a Manchu noblewoman, Tang Shixia, but they had no children. He left his wife behind when he went to Japan, and the marriage was dissolved some years later. After graduating from the Imperial Japanese Army Academy, Pujie agreed to an arranged marriage with a Japanese noblewoman. He selected Hiro Saga, who was a relative of the Japanese imperial family, from a photograph from a number of possible candidates vetted by the Kwantung Army. In his autobiography, Pujie later claimed that he chose Hiro Saga because she bore resemblance to Takarazuka Revue actress Kusabue Yoshiko, whom he admired.

As Puyi did not have an heir, the wedding had strong political implications, and was aimed at both fortifying relations between the two countries and introducing Japanese blood into the Manchu imperial family.

The engagement ceremony took place at the Manchukuo embassy in Tokyo on 2 February 1937 with the official wedding held in the Imperial Army Hall at Kudanzaka, Tokyo, on 3 April. In October, the couple moved to Xinjing, the capital of Manchukuo, where Puyi was then the Emperor.

== Life in Manchukuo ==
As Puyi had no children, Pujie was regarded as first in line to succeed his brother as the emperor of Manchukuo; the Japanese officially proclaimed him the heir presumptive. However, Pujie was not appointed by his brother as the heir to the throne of the Qing dynasty, as imperial tradition stated that a childless emperor should choose his heir from a subsequent generation instead of from his own generation. While in Manchukuo, Pujie served in the Manchukuo Imperial Guards. He returned to Japan in 1943 to attend the Army Staff College.

At the time of the collapse of Manchukuo during the Soviet invasion of Manchuria in August 1945, Pujie initially attempted to escape to Japan with his brother. However, as it became apparent that no escape was possible, he opted to return to Xinjing in an unsuccessful attempt to surrender the city to forces of the Republic of China, rather than have the city fall into foreign hands.

Pujie was arrested by the Soviet Red Army and first sent to a prison camp in Chita, and then to another in Khabarovsk along with his brother and other relatives. He spent about five years in the Soviet prison camps until 1950, when the Sino-Soviet rapprochement allowed him and his fellow captives to be extradited to the newly founded People's Republic of China.

== Life in the People's Republic of China ==
On his return to China, Pujie was incarcerated in the War Criminals Management Centre in Fushun, Liaoning. A model prisoner, he was eventually pardoned and released from prison by the Chinese government in 1960. He joined the Communist Party and served in a number of positions. In 1961, with permission from Chinese premier Zhou Enlai, he was reunited with his wife and younger daughter Husheng and settled in Beijing, while his daughter would later return to Japan, becoming a citizen there. In 1963, his daughter returned to stay with him and his wife for one year before returning to Japan again.

In 1978, Pujie became a deputy from Shanghai at the 5th National People's Congress. He subsequently served as Vice Chairman of the Ethnic Affairs Committee of the 6th National People's Congress in 1983. He was appointed Deputy Head of the China–Japan Friendship Group from 1985. He rose to a seat on the Presidium of the 7th National People's Congress in 1988. From 1986, Pujie was also Honorary Director of the Welfare Fund for Handicapped.

Pujie was also a technical adviser for the 1987 film The Last Emperor, directed by Bernardo Bertolucci. On 28 November 1991, he was awarded the honorary degree of Doctor of Law by Ritsumeikan University in Kyoto, Japan. He died of illness on 28 February 1994 in Beijing at the age of 87. His body was cremated, and half of his ashes were buried at Nakayama Shrine in Shimonoseki, Yamaguchi Prefecture, Japan, while the other half were buried in Beijing.

== Family ==
- First wife, of the Tatara clan (唐氏; 1904–1993), personal name Shixia (石霞)
- Second wife, of the Saga clan (嵯峨氏; 16 March 1914 – 20 June 1987), personal name Hiro (浩)
  - Huisheng (26 February 1938 – 4 December 1957), (慧生)
  - Husheng (b. 13 March 1940), (嫮生)
    - Married Kenji (健治) of the Japanese Fukunaga (福永) clan in 1968, and had issue (three sons, two daughters)

=== Immediate family ===
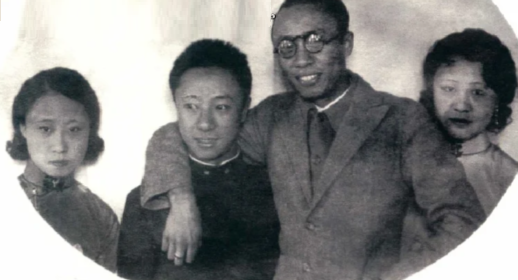
A young Pujie, centre left, with his brother Puyi and sisters

Pujie's first wife was Tang Yiying (唐怡瑩; 1904–1993), who was better known as Tang Shixia (唐石霞). She was from the Manchu Tatara (他他拉) clan, and was the daughter of Zhiqi, a brother of the Guangxu Emperor's concubines Consort Zhen and Consort Jin. Pujie married Tang when he was 17, but did not get along well with her. In 1926, Tang became Zhang Xueliang's mistress and broke ties with Pujie and his family. When Pujie went to Japan for his studies, Tang had another affair – this time with Lu Xiaojia (盧筱嘉), the son of the warlord Lu Yongxiang. She looted Pujie's ancestral house, the Prince Chun Mansion in Beijing. Since then, Pujie and Tang had lived separately until their divorce. In 1949, Tang moved to Hong Kong and became a lecturer at the School of Eastern Languages in the University of Hong Kong.

In 1935, when Pujie returned to China from his studies in Japan, Puyi tried to help his brother find a Manchu wife. Pujie met one, Wang Mintong (王敏彤), but they never married.

Pujie eventually married Hiro Saga, a Japanese noblewoman related to the Japanese imperial family, under an arranged marriage. They had two daughters: Huisheng (1938–1957) and Husheng (嫮生; born 1940). Huisheng died on 4 December 1957 at Mount Amagi in Japan in what appeared to be a murder–suicide case, while Husheng married Fukunaga Kenji (福永健治) and became known as "Fukunaga Kosei" after her marriage. The couple had five children.

Styles of Aisin Gioro Pujie
- Reference style: His Imperial Highness
- Spoken style: Your Imperial Highness

== See also ==
- Royal and noble ranks of the Qing dynasty
- Imperial Chinese harem system § Qing

== Bibliography ==
- Aisin Gioro, Pujie (1994). 溥杰自传 [Autobiography of Pujie] (in Chinese) (1st ed.). Beijing: 中国文史出版社. ISBN 978-7-5034-0684-3.
- Behr, Edward (1987). The Last Emperor. Bantam. ISBN 0-553-34474-9.
- Cotter, Edward (2007). Kids Who Rule: The Remarkable Lives of Five Child Monarchs. Annick Press. ISBN 978-1-55451-062-7.
- Lebra, Takie Sugiyama (1995). Above the Clouds: Status Culture of the Modern Japanese Nobility. University of California Press. ISBN 0-520-07602-8.
