= Li Shuxian =

Wife of former emperor Puyi (1924–1997)

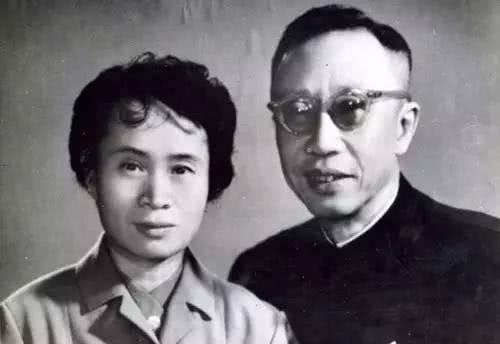
- Li Shuxian (left) with her husband Puyi (right)
- Born: 4 September 1924; Republic of China
- Died: 9 June 1997 (aged 72); People's Republic of China
- Spouse: Puyi (m. 1962; died 1967)

Li Shuxian (Chinese: 李淑賢; pinyin: Lǐ Shūxían; Wade–Giles: Li^{3} Shu^{1}-hsien^{2}; 4 September 1924 – 9 June 1997), was the fifth and last wife of Puyi, the last emperor of the Qing dynasty in China.

== Biography ==
Li was ethnic Han Chinese and orphaned by the age of 14. After three years in foster care, her foster mother attempted to enter her into concubinage with a wealthy man. Li refused, and ran away to Beijing to become a hospital worker. In 1959, after ten years in prison, Puyi was pardoned. The pair were introduced to one another by a friend in 1962 and wed that same year. Premier Zhou Enlai approved their marriage. It was Li's third marriage, and Puyi's fifth. They had no children. She remained with Puyi to his last days.

After her husband's death, Li retired from public life. She was not a regular hospital employee, but supplemented her income with a special stipend from the government that gave her a degree of financial stability.

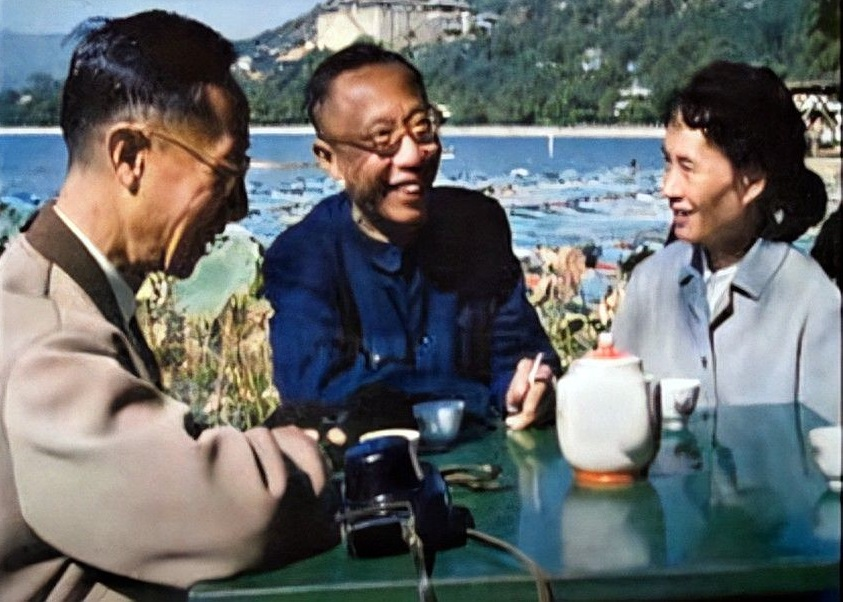
Puyi with Li Shuxian in the 1960s

In the early eighties, she sought and received legal ownership of royalties from Puyi's autobiography from the government of China.

Under the approval of the government, she moved Puyi's ashes closer to his ancestors in the Western Qing Tombs (清西陵) from the Babaoshan Revolutionary Cemetery, allowing the last Qing Emperor to rest alongside his predecessors at last. She died of lung cancer at the age of 72. It had been Puyi's desire to be buried alongside Li as well as his first concubine Tan Yuling (潭玉齡). Li was firmly against this arrangement, stating that she had given Puyi enough of her time and energy in life.

Li's memoirs were published posthumously under the title Modai Huangdi Puyi yu wo (末代皇帝溥仪与我; ''Last Emperor Puyi and I''). The author, Wang Qingxiang (王慶祥), compiled oral interviews with Li Shuxian, along with those of others close to Puyi in his later years, to retell their marriage and family life. Li is sometimes credited as a coauthor of the book.
