= Tan Yuling =

Concubine of emperor Puyi (1920–1942)

- Noble Consort Mingxian
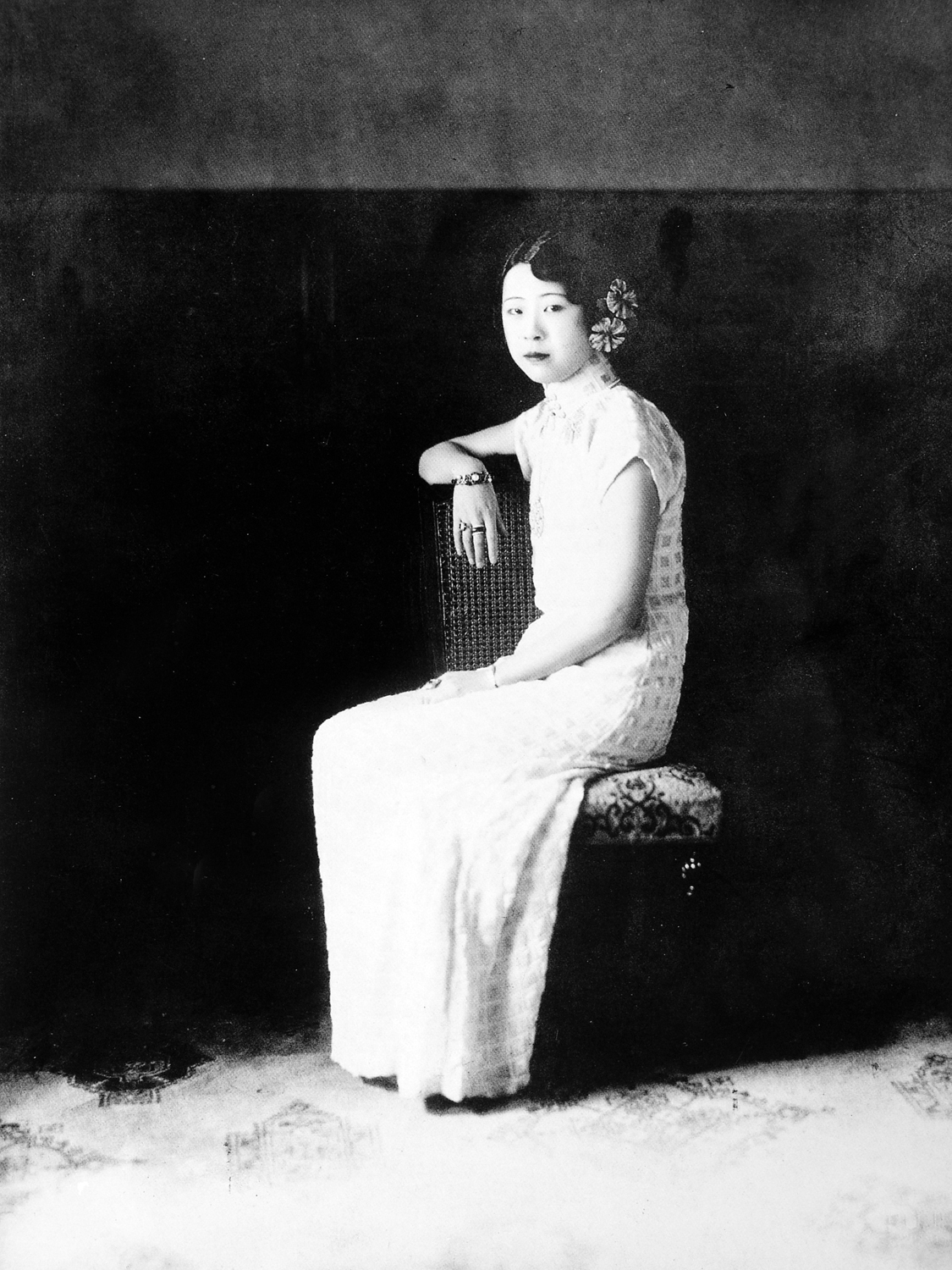
- Born: Tatara Yuling; 11 August 1920; Beijing, Republic of China
- Died: 14 August 1942 (aged 22); Xinjing, Manchukuo
- Spouse: Puyi (m. 1937)
Names
- Tatara Yuling (他他拉·玉齡)
Posthumous name
- Noble Consort Mingxian (明賢貴妃)
- House: Tatara
- Father: Tatara Zhaoxu

Tan Yuling, Noble Consort Mingxian (born Tatara Yuling; 11 August 1920 – 14 August 1942), was a concubine of China's last emperor Puyi. She married Puyi when the latter was the nominal emperor of the puppet state of Manchukuo during the Second Sino-Japanese War. Her given name "Yuling" is sometimes translated into English as "Jade Years".

== Biography ==
Yuling was born to the prosperous Tatara clan in Beijing, her family is a Manchu noble family. Her father Zhaoxu was a high-ranking warlord who administered the area around Beijing and Tianjin. Yuling's two aunts were in the Guangxu Emperor's harem as Consort Jin and Consort Zhen. Tan Yuling lost her parents when she was young, and she and her brother Tan Zhiyuan were raised by their aunt. Even after the Qing Dynasty fell, the Tatara clan continued to be very prosperous, but they changed their names to Tan, to avoid being discriminated for their Manchu ethnicity.

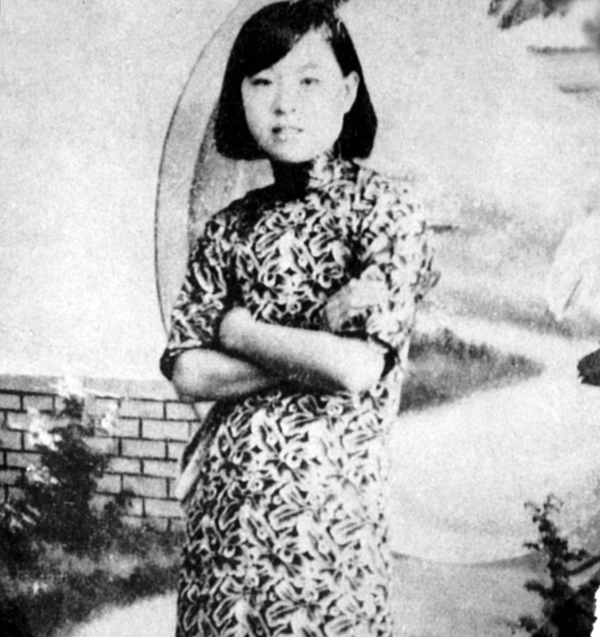
Imperial Concubine Tan Yulin, 1937

In early 1937, when Tan was still attending a middle school in Beijing, she was chosen to be a wife of Puyi and she travelled to Manchukuo's capital Xinjing (Changchun). On 6 April, she married Puyi in the Xinjing palace and was given the title of Imperial Concubine Xiang. Puyi liked her very much and asked Chen Zengju to teach her how to read Chinese books for six years. She became very close to Puyi after their marriage and in time, she became Noble Consort Xiang and became the manager of the Imperial Harem, as Empress Xiaokemin was not in favour anymore. Yuling reviled the Japanese.

Tan died in 1942 while being treated for cystitis less than a day after her Japanese doctor gave her an injection. The circumstances surrounding her death were suspicious because Tan was said to have resented the Japanese due to their control over Puyi. Kwantung Army staff officer Yoshioka Yasunori (吉岡安則), who was an attaché to the Manchukuo imperial household, once urged Puyi to take a Japanese bride, but Puyi had already married Tan, so he ignored Yoshioka. Yoshioka was said to be unhappy about this. Following Tan's death, Puyi was again pressed by Yoshioka to choose a Japanese spouse, but he refused.

Puyi granted Tan the posthumous title of Noble Consort Mingxian (明賢貴妃) and held a funeral for her in Banruo Temple (般若寺) in Xinjing. After the fall of Manchukuo in 1945, following the Japanese surrender at the end of World War II, Puyi ordered Tan's remains to be cremated and the ashes sent to her relatives in Beijing. Puyi kept a photograph of Tan with him until his death in 1967.

== Gallery of Changchun House, Tan Yuling's former residence ==
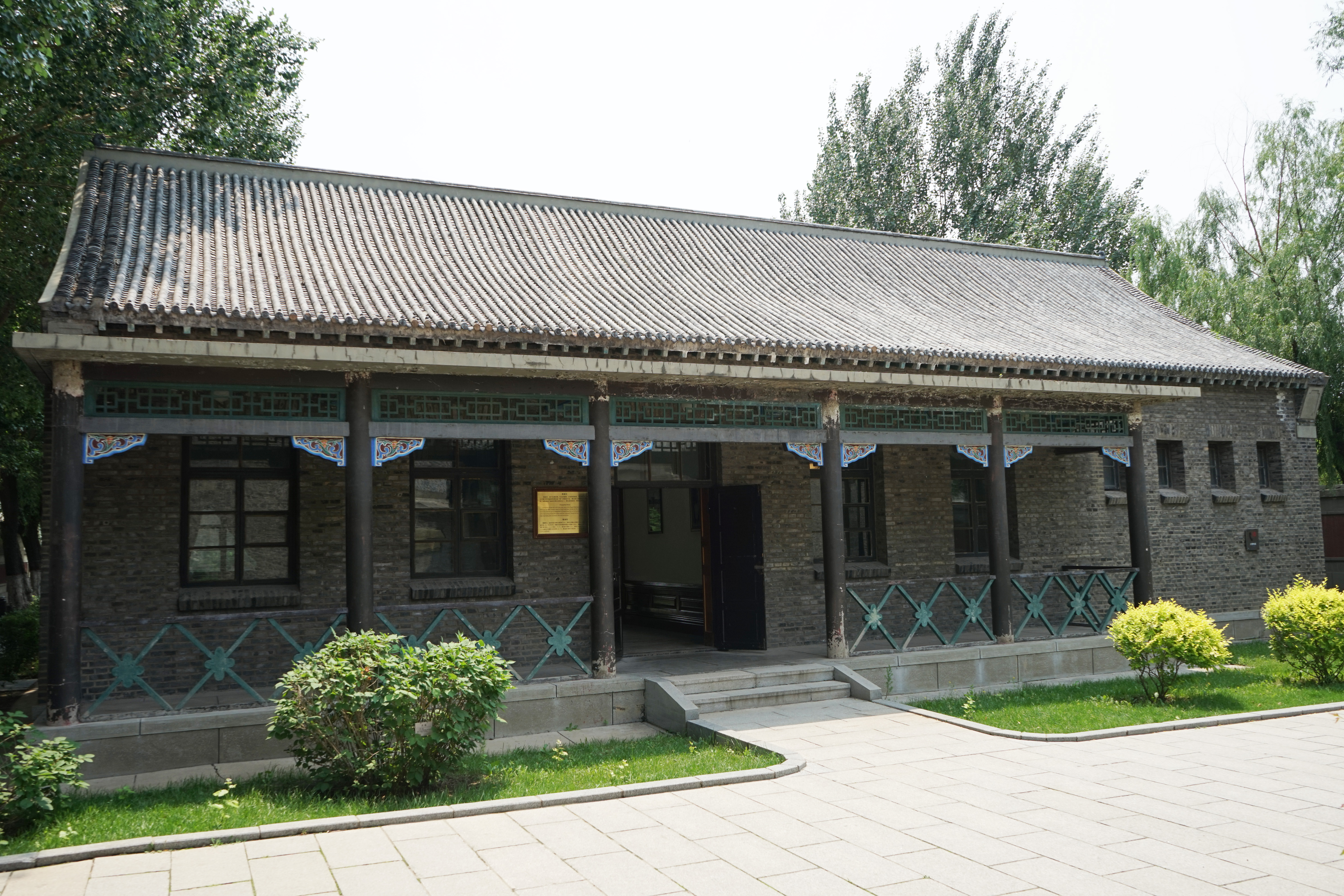
Changchun House. It was built in the early years of Manchukuo. Firstly, the fourth and fifth younger sisters of Puyi lived here. In July 1937, Puyi's father Zaifeng lived here. After Tan Yuling was coffered "Xiang Gui Ren", it became her residence.

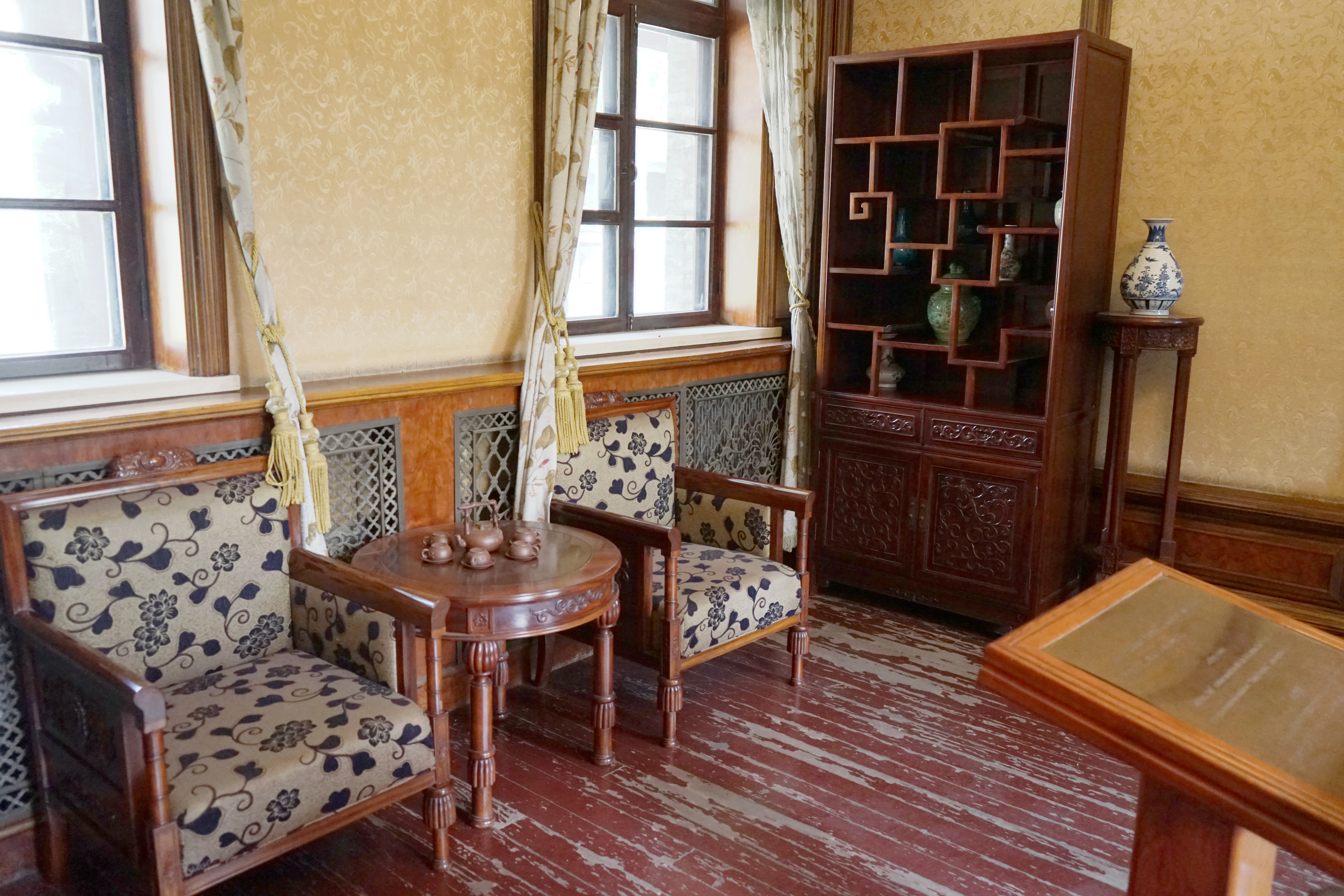
Changchun House Living Room. Zaifeng used it in 1934, in 1937. It was also the receiving room of Tan Yuling.

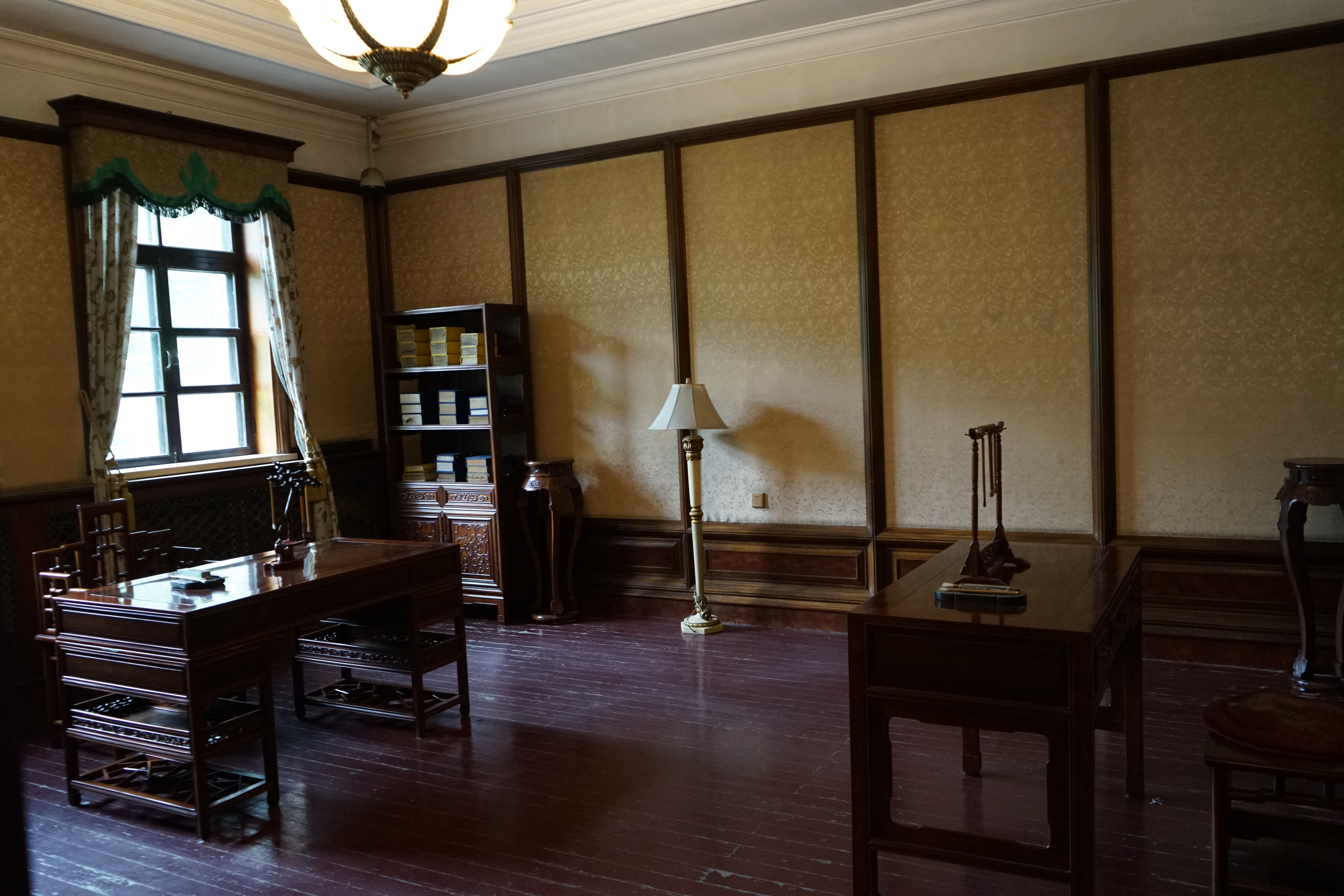
Changchun House Classroom, where Tan Yuling was taught.
