= Mount Amagi =

Range of volcanic mountains in central Izu Peninsula

- 天城山
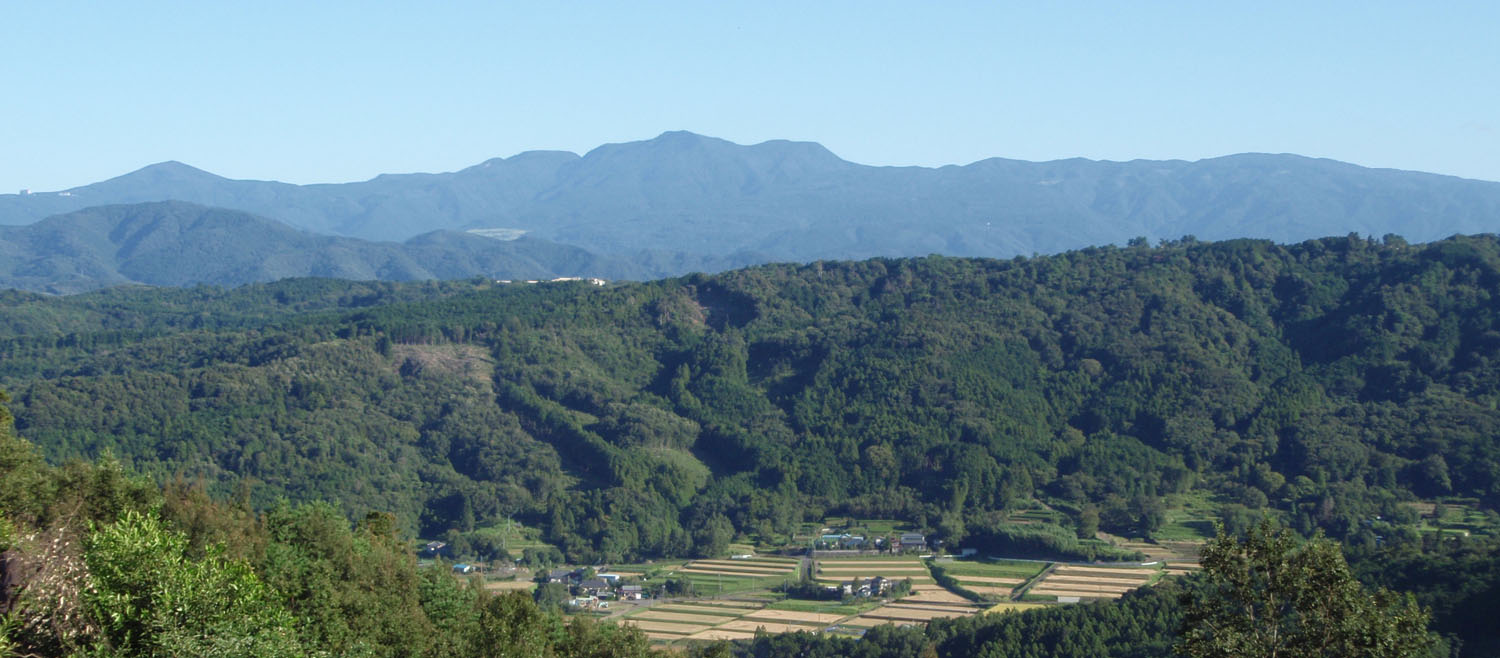
- View from the north

Highest point
- Elevation: 1,406 m (4,613 ft)
- Prominence: 1,046 m (3,432 ft)
- Listing: Mountains of Japan, Ribu
- Coordinates: 34°51′46″N 139°00′06″E

Geography
- Location within Japan
- Country: Japan
- Prefecture: Shizuoka
- Peninsula: Izu

Geology
- Mountain type: Stratovolcano
- Rock type: Andesite
- Volcanic arc: Izu–Bonin–Mariana Arc
- Last eruption: 0.2 Ma

Climbing
- Easiest route: Hike

Mount Amagi (天城山, Amagi-san) is a range of volcanic mountains in central Izu Peninsula in Shizuoka Prefecture, Japan, forming the border between Izu City and Higashi-Izu Town. It is also referred to as the Amagi Mountain Range (天城連山, Amagi Renzan).

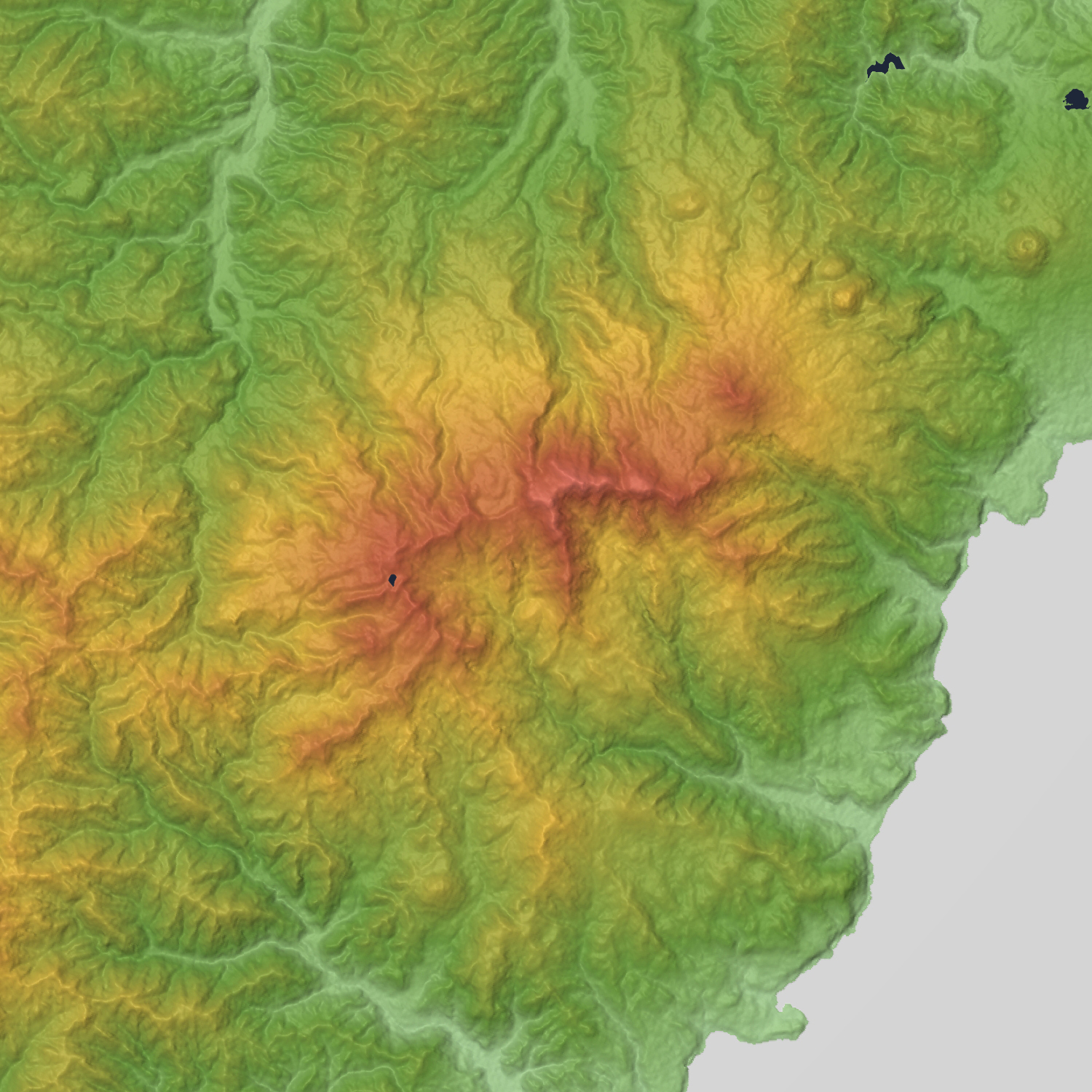
Relief map of Amagi Volcano

The Amagi mountains have several peaks, the tallest of which are Bansaburōdake (万三郎岳) at 1,406 metres (4,613 ft), Banjirōdake (万二郎岳) at 1,300 metres (4,300 ft), and Tōgasayama (遠笠山) at 1,197 metres (3,927 ft).

There are several hiking routes to the top. Flora in the area include rhododendrons, Japanese andromeda, stewartia monadelpha and Siebold's beech.

Many ships of the Imperial Japanese Navy were named after it, including a corvette, a battlecruiser and an aircraft carrier.

Amagi is listed as one of the 100 Famous Japanese Mountains in a book composed in 1964 by mountaineer/author Kyūya Fukada.

== Gallery ==
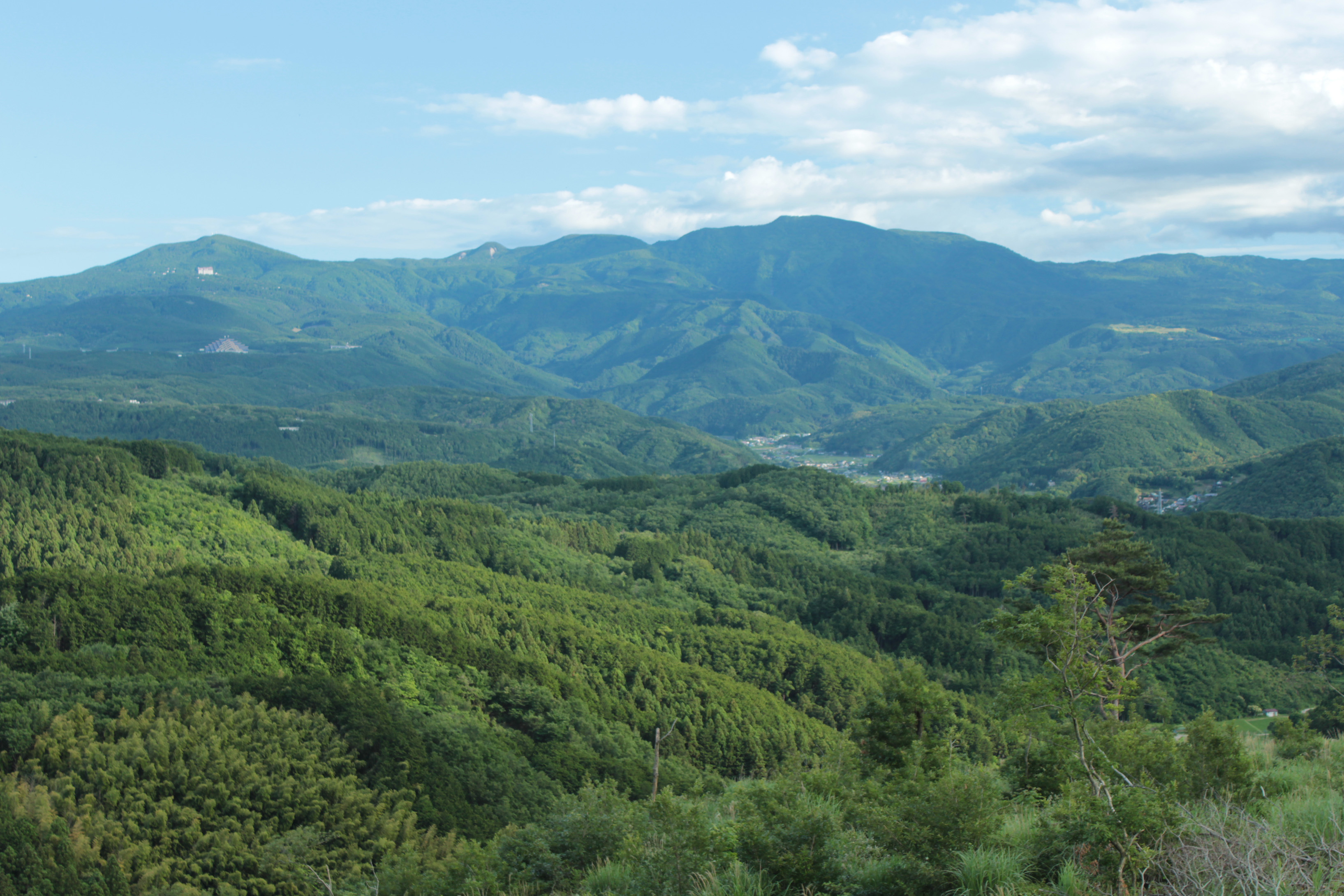
View from the north

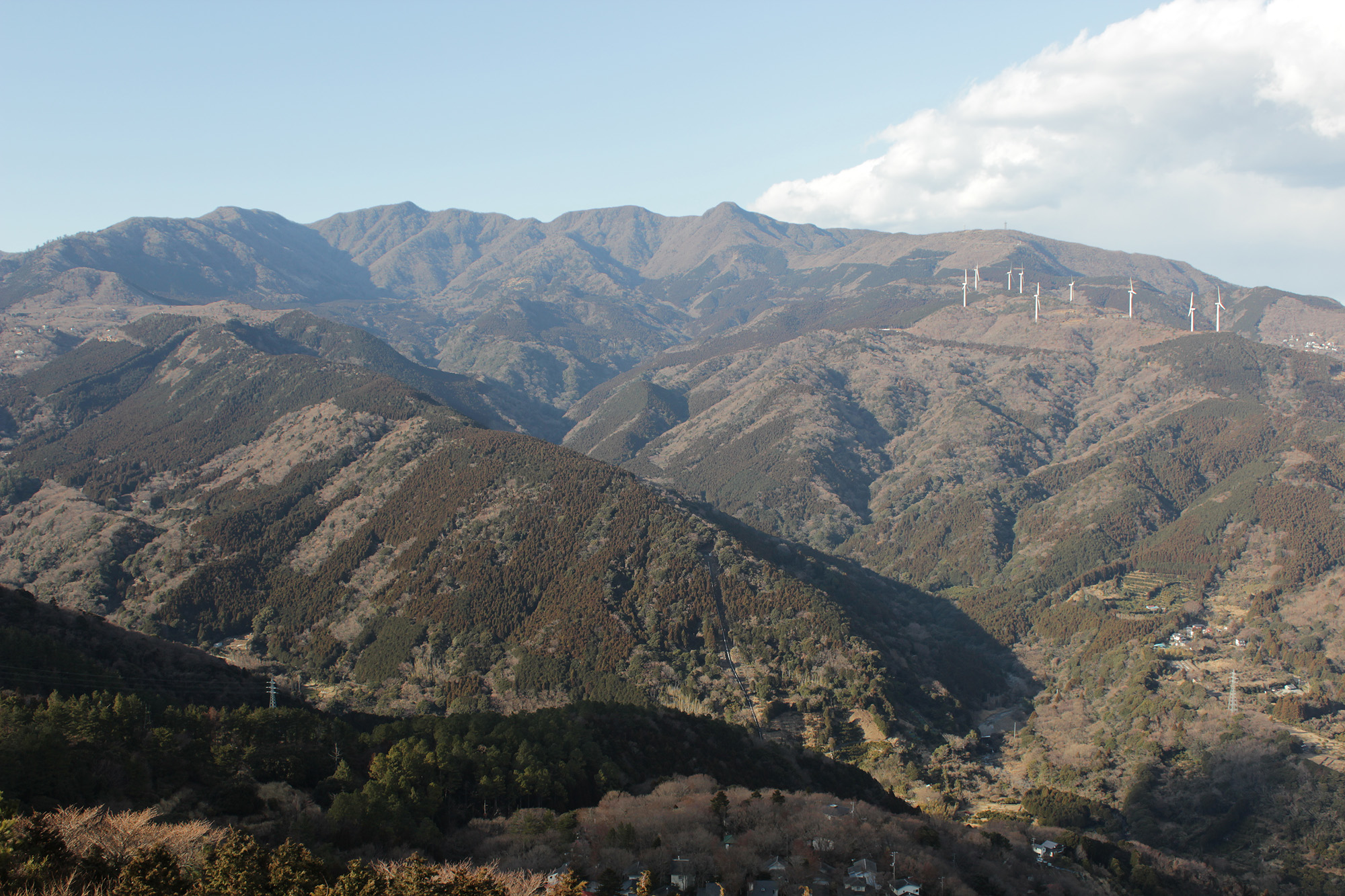
View from the south

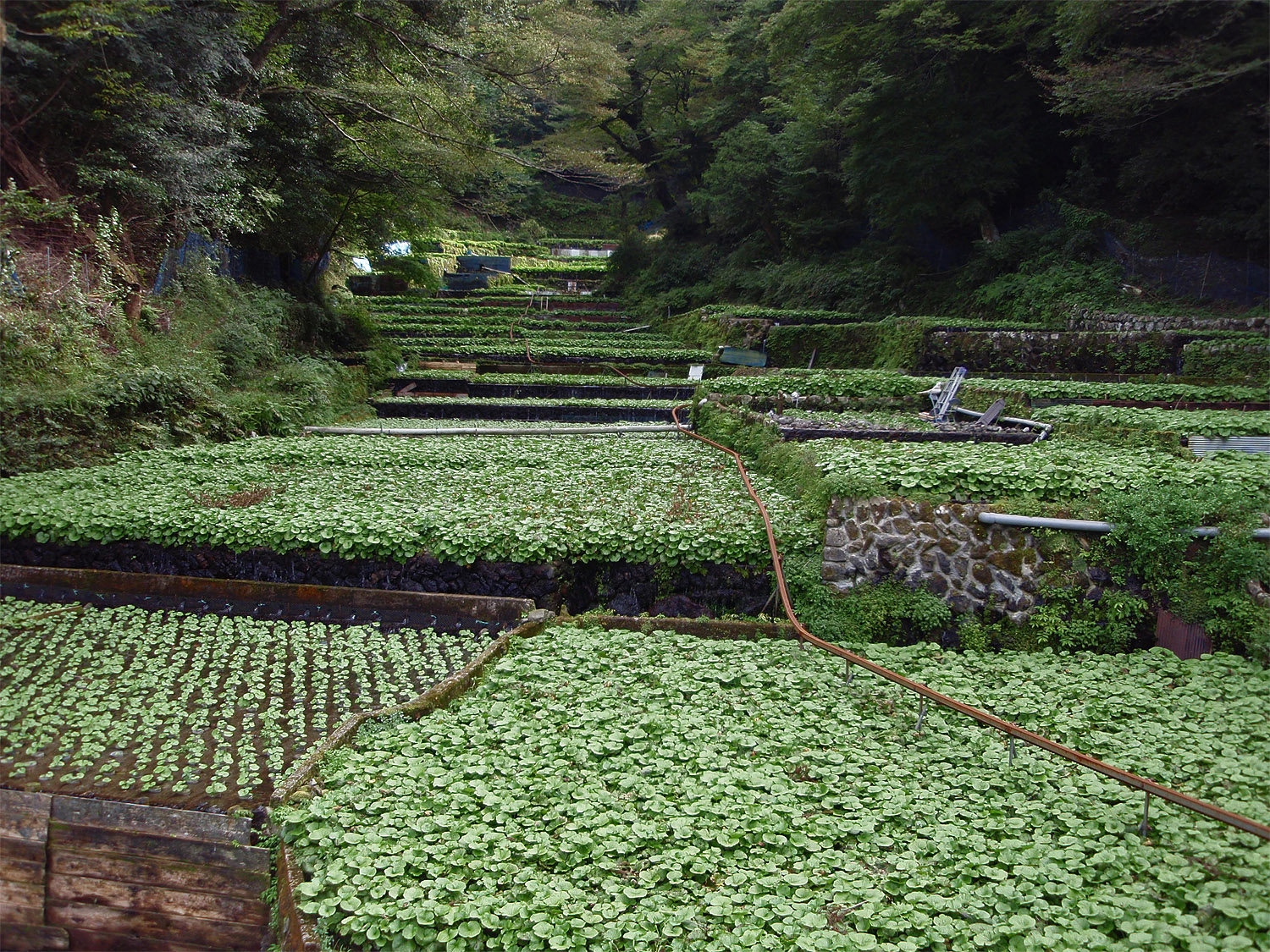
Mount Amagi is a well-known producer of wasabi, which grows naturally along Japan's stream beds in mountain river valleys.
