= Manchukuo =

1932–1945 Japanese puppet state in northern China

Coordinates: 43°53′N 125°19′E

Manchoukuo 滿洲國
- 1932–1945
- Flag Emblem
- Motto: "Five Races Under One Union"
- Anthem: National Anthem of Manchukuo (used 1933–1942) (used 1942–1945)
- Imperial seal 滿洲帝國之寶

- Manchukuo The Greater East Asia Co-Prosperity Sphere at its furthest extent
- Status: Puppet state of the Empire of Japan (1932–1945)
- Capital: Hsinking (Changchun) (until 9 August 1945); Tonghua (from 9 August 1945)
- Largest city: Harbin
- Official languages: Manchurian (Chinese); Japanese (Note: Japanese and Northeastern Mandarin, the latter referred to as 'Manchurian' (滿洲語), were used as official languages. There was also Kyowa-go, a pidgin of Japanese and Chinese. Japanese was the primary language in military and government offices, as well as the usual language of instruction in most higher educational institutions such as universities. After January 1938, Chinese (as 'Manchurian'), Japanese, and Mongolian were designated as national languages and taught in schools.)
- Demonyms: Manchurian, (Note: Chinese: 滿洲人; pinyin: Mǎnzhōurén; Wade–Giles: Man^{3}-chou^{1}-jên^{2}; Japanese: 満州人; rōmaji: Manshūjin; see also 滿人 Hanyu Pinyin: Mǎnrén; Wade–Giles: Man^{3}-jên^{2}; Japanese pronunciation: Manjin) Manchoukuoan (Note: traditional Chinese: 滿洲國人; pinyin: Mǎnzhōuguórén; Wade–Giles: Man^{3}-chou^{1}-kuo^{2}-jên^{2}; Japanese: 満州国; rōmaji: Manshūkokujin)
- Government: Provisional government (1932–1934); One-party semi-constitutional monarchy (Note: Emperor Puyi was given broad powers, including the exercise of legislative powers, (subject to approval by the Legislative Council) the issuing of ordinances, (which could not alter any existing laws) and the appointment of the cabinet, along with a few other privileges.) (1934–1945); under a military dictatorship
- Head of state
  - 1932–1945: Puyi (Note: as Chief Executive (until 1934), later as Emperor of Manchukuo from 1934.)
- Prime Minister
  - 1932–1935: Zheng Xiaoxu
  - 1935–1945: Zhang Jinghui
- Legislature: Legislative Council
- Historical era: Interwar period and World War II
  - Japanese invasion: 18 September 1931
  - Northeast Supreme Administrative Council: 16 February 1932
  - Established: 1 March 1932
  - Rehe annexed: 4 March 1933
  - Empire proclaimed: 1 March 1934
  - Member of GEACPS: 30 November 1940
  - Soviet invasion: 9 August 1945
  - Dissolution: 20 August 1945

Area
  - Total: 984,195 km^{2} (380,000 sq mi)
- Currency: Chinese customs gold unit; Manchukuo yuan
Preceded by
Republic of China
Northeast Supreme Administrative Council
National People's Government
Succeeded by
Soviet occupation of Manchuria
- Today part of: China

Manchukuo

Chinese name
- Traditional Chinese: 滿洲國
- Simplified Chinese: 满洲国
- Literal meaning: State of Manchuria
Transcriptions
Standard Mandarin
- Hanyu Pinyin: Mǎnzhōuguó
- Bopomofo: ㄇㄢˇ ㄓㄡ ㄍㄨㄛˊ
- Wade–Giles: Man^{3}-chou^{1}-kuo^{2}
- IPA: [mànʈʂóʊkwǒ]

Japanese name
- Hiragana: まんしゅうこく
- Kyūjitai: 滿洲國
- Shinjitai: 満州国
Transcriptions
- Revised Hepburn: Manshū-koku
- Kunrei-shiki: Mansyû-koku

Manchoutikuo

Alternative Chinese name
- Traditional Chinese: 滿洲帝國
- Simplified Chinese: 满洲帝国
- Literal meaning: Empire of Manchuria
Transcriptions
Standard Mandarin
- Hanyu Pinyin: Mǎnzhōudìguó
- Bopomofo: ㄇㄢˇ ㄓㄡ ㄉㄧˋ ㄍㄨㄛˊ
- Wade–Giles: Man^{3}-chou^{1}-ti^{4}-kuo^{2}
- IPA: [mànʈʂóu̯ tîku̯ǒ]

Alternative Japanese name
- Kanji: 満州帝国
- Hiragana: まんしゅうていこく
- Katakana: マンシュウテイコク
Transcriptions
- Revised Hepburn: Manshū-teikoku
- Kunrei-shiki: Mansyû-teikoku

Manchukuo or Manchoukuo (Note: See below for other names.) was a puppet state of the Empire of Japan in Manchuria that existed from 1932 until its dissolution in 1945. Its territory consisted of the lands seized in the Japanese invasion of Manchuria and only received limited diplomatic recognition, primarily from states aligned with the Axis powers, with its existence widely regarded as illegitimate.

The region of Manchuria, present day Northeast China, had historically been the homeland of the Manchu people, though by the 20th century they had long since become a minority in the region, with Han Chinese constituting by far the largest ethnic group. The Manchu-led Qing dynasty, which had governed China since the 17th century, was overthrown with the permanent abolition of the dynastic system in the 1911 Xinhai Revolution, with Puyi, the final emperor of China, forced to abdicate at the age of six. In 1931, Manchuria was invaded and occupied by the Empire of Japan following the Mukden incident. A puppet government was set up the following year, with Puyi brought in by the Japanese to serve as its nominal regent, though he himself had no actual political power. Japanese officials ultimately made all pertinent decisions, and exercised total control over Puyi's court and personal safety. Upon Manchukuo's transition into a formal monarchy, Puyi was proclaimed as the emperor of Manchukuo.

The Japanese population of Manchuria increased dramatically during this period, largely due to Japan's efforts to resettle young, land-poor farmers from inner Japan. By 1945, more than a million Japanese people had settled within Manchukuo. The region's Korean population also increased during this period. Under vice-minister Nobusuke Kishi and the Manchurian Industrial Development Company, heavy industry was dramatically expanded using slave labor of the local populations. Manchukuo was the primary launching ground for further invasion of China in the Second Sino-Japanese War, beginning with the 1937 Marco Polo Bridge incident.

Regions in the western part of the country with large Mongolian populations were ruled under a slightly different system, reflecting the distinct traditions extant there. The southern tip of the Liaodong Peninsula, now the city of Dalian, continued to be ruled directly by Japan as the Kwantung Leased Territory until the end of the war.

The state was ultimately toppled at the end of World War II with the Soviet invasion of Manchuria in August 1945; its government was formally dissolved following the surrender of Japan in September. The territory was transferred to Chinese administration the following year. (Note: Although the territories came under the jurisdiction of the Kuomintang before the Chinese Civil War came to its conclusion in 1949, the brief Soviet occupation helped transform the region into a power base for the Chinese Communist troops led by Mao Zedong where the People's Liberation Army could resupply itself with Japanese equipment and gain a strategic advantage against the National Revolutionary Army headed by Chiang Kai-shek.)

== Names ==
Manchukuo was most consistently referred to by its government as Manchoukuo (from Chinese: 滿洲國; Wade–Giles: Man³-chou¹-kuo²) in English. Manchou, originally the Chinese ethnonym for the Manchu people, took on a geographic sense due to foreign and especially Japanese influence in the 19th century. Manchuria was used as a gloss for Manchou, and in the country's declaration of independence, "State of Manchuria" was used as a gloss for Manchoukuo; at the League of Nations it was called the State of Manchoukuo.

Following Puyi's proclamation as Emperor in 1934, Manchoutikuo (Chinese: 滿洲帝國; Wade–Giles: Man³-chou¹-ti⁴-kuo²) or the 'Empire of Manchou' were designated as the official English names, with Manchou Empire (Note: Also spelt Manchu Empire by foreign press) and 'Manchoukuo' as "abbreviated" forms. In spite of this, the 'abbreviated' form of Manchoukuo was used far more often than the 'unabbreviated' forms. (Note: Compare the prevalence of 'Manchoukuo' in the following sources to other names:)

In Chinese, the name of Manchukuo has often been prefixed with 偽; wěi; 'puppet' to stress its perceived illegitimacy.

== History ==
=== Background ===
The Qing dynasty was founded in the 17th century by Manchus hailing from northeastern China, conquering the ethnically Han Shun and Ming dynasties. The Qing stated explicitly in various edicts, as well as within the Treaty of Nerchinsk, that the Manchu home provinces belonged to China.

As the power of the court in Beijing weakened, many of the empire's outlying areas either broke free (such as Kashgar) or fell under the control of the Western imperialist powers. The Russian Empire had set its sights on Qing's northern territories, and through unequal treaties signed in 1858 and 1860 ultimately annexed huge tracts of territory adjoining the Amur River outright, now known collectively as Outer Manchuria. As the Qing continued to weaken, Russia made further efforts to take control of the rest of Manchuria. By the 1890s, the region was under strong Russian influence, symbolized by the Russian-built Chinese Eastern Railway that ran from Harbin to Vladivostok.

The Japanese ultra-nationalist Black Dragon Society initially supported Sun Yat-sen's activities against the Qing state, hoping that an overthrow of the Qing would enable a Japanese takeover of the Manchu homeland, with the belief that Han Chinese would not oppose it. Tōyama Mitsuru, who was the Society's leader as well as a member of the pan-Asian secret society Gen'yōsha, additionally believed that the anti-Qing revolutionaries would even aid the Japanese in taking over, as well as helping them to enlarge the opium trade that the Qing were currently trying to destroy. The Society would support Sun and other anti-Manchu revolutionaries until the Qing ultimately collapsed. In Japan, many anti-Qing revolutionaries gathered in exile, where they founded and operated the Tongmenghui resistance movement, whose first meeting was hosted by the Black Dragon Society. The Black Dragon Society had a large impact on Sun specifically, cultivating an intimate relationship with him. Sun often promoted pan-Asianism, and sometimes even passed himself off as Japanese. In the wake of the 1911 Revolution, the Black Dragons began infiltrating China, making inroads selling opium and spreading anti-communist ideas. Eventually, they also began directly agitating for a Japanese takeover of Manchuria.

With the Russo-Japanese War, Japanese influence largely replaced that of Russia in Manchuria. Japan had mobilized one million soldiers to fight the Russians in Manchuria, one for every eight Japanese families. Despite shocking success, the Japanese military underwent heavy losses, ultimately incurring about 500,000 casualties. The war caused many Japanese people to develop a more possessive attitude towards Manchuria, with Japan having sacrificed so much while fighting in Manchurian territory. From 1905 on, Japanese publications often described Manchuria as a "sacred" and "holy" land where many Japanese had died as martyrs. The war had almost bankrupted Japan, forcing the Japanese to accept the compromise Treaty of Portsmouth mediated by President Theodore Roosevelt of the United States, under which Japan made gains, but nowhere to the extent that the Japanese public had been expecting. The Treaty of Portsmouth set off an anti-American riot in Tokyo between 5–7 September 1905 as the general viewpoint in Japan was that the Japanese had won the war but lost the peace. The perception in Japan was the Treaty of Portsmouth was a humiliating diplomatic disaster that did not place all of Manchuria into the Japanese sphere of influence as widely expected, and the question of Manchuria was still "unfinished business" that would one day be resolved by the Imperial Army. In 1906, Japan established the South Manchurian Railway on the southern half of the former Chinese Eastern Railway built by Russia from Manzhouli to Vladivostok via Harbin with a branch line from Harbin to Port Arthur, now known as Dalian.

Under the terms of the Treaty of Portsmouth, the Kwantung Army had the right to occupy southern Manchuria while the region fell into the Japanese economic sphere of influence. The Japanese-owned South Manchurian Railroad company had a market capitalization of 200 million yen, making it Asia's largest corporation, which went beyond just running the former Russian railroad network in southern Manchuria to owning the ports, mines, hotels, telephone lines, and sundry other businesses, dominating the economy of Manchuria. With the growth of the South Manchuria Railroad company (Mantetsu) came a growth in number of Japanese people living in Manchuria, from a Japanese population of 16,612 in 1906 to one of 233,749 in 1930. The majority of blue-collar employees for Mantetsu were Chinese, and the Japanese employees were mostly white-collar, meaning most of the Japanese living in Manchuria were middle-class people who saw themselves as an elite. In Japan, Manchuria was widely seen as analogous to the Wild West: a dangerous frontier region full of bandits, revolutionaries, and warlords, but also a land of boundless wealth and promise, where it was possible for ordinary people to become very well-off. During the interwar period, Manchuria once again became a political and military battleground between Russia, Japan, and China. Imperial Japan moved into Russia's far eastern territories, taking advantage of internal chaos following the Russian Revolution. However, in the years following the establishment of the Soviet Union, a combination of Soviet military successes and American economic pressure forced the Japanese to withdraw from the area, and Outer Manchuria would be under Soviet control by 1925.

=== Japanese invasion and establishment of Manchukuo ===
During the Warlord Era, Marshal Zhang Zuolin established himself in Manchuria with Japanese backing. Later, the Japanese Kwantung Army found him too independent, so he was assassinated in 1928. In assassinating Marshal Zhang, the 'Old Marshal', the Kwantung Army generals expected Manchuria to descend into anarchy, providing the pretext for seizing the region. Marshal Zhang was killed when the bridge his train was riding across was blown up while three Chinese men were murdered and explosive equipment was placed on their corpses to make it appear that they were the killers, but the plot was foiled when Zhang's son Zhang Xueliang, the 'Young Marshal', succeeded him without incident while Tokyo refused to send additional troops to Manchuria. Given that the Kwantung Army had assassinated his father, the "Young Marshal"—who unlike his father was a Chinese nationalist—had strong reasons to dislike Japan's privileged position in Manchuria. Marshal Zhang knew his forces were too weak to expel the Kwantung Army, but his relations with the Japanese were unfriendly right from the start.

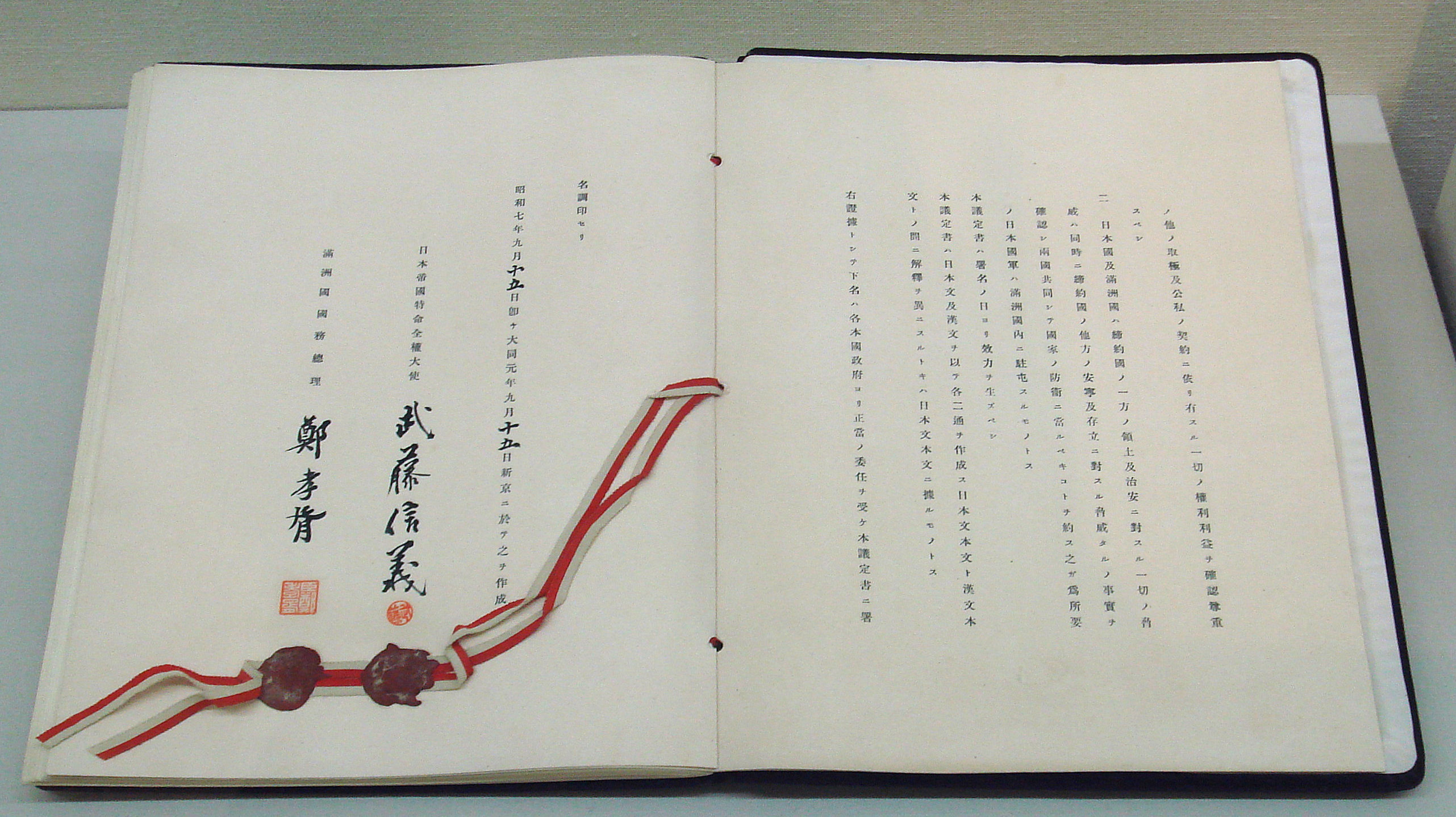
The Japan–Manchukuo Protocol signed on 15 September 1932

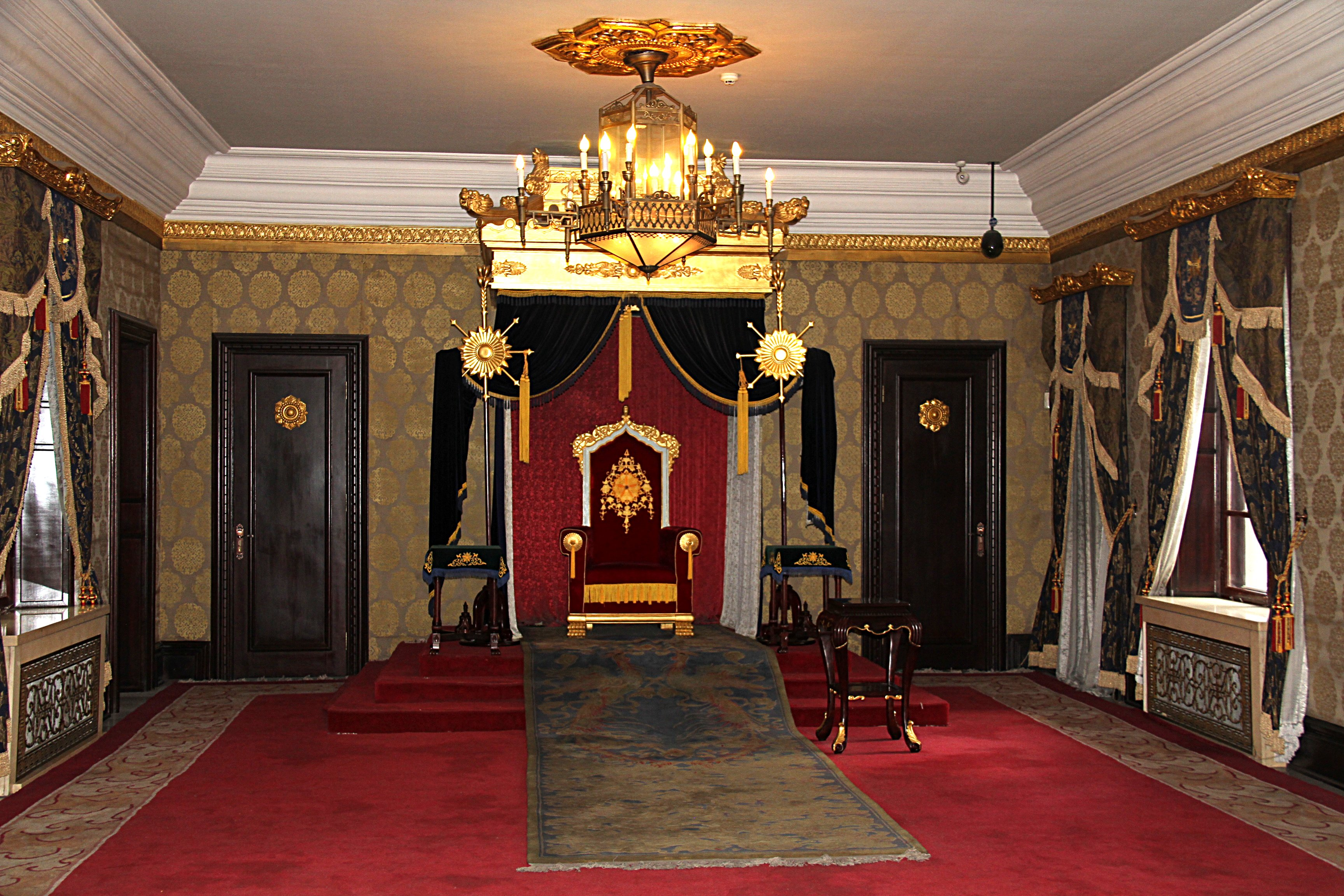
Throne of the Emperor of Manchukuo

After the Mukden incident and Japanese invasion of Manchuria in 1931, Japanese militarists moved forward to separate the region from Chinese control and to create a Japanese puppet state. To create an air of legitimacy, the last Emperor of China, Puyi, was invited to come with his followers and act as the head of state for Manchuria. One of his faithful companions was Zheng Xiaoxu, a Qing reformist and loyalist.

The "Northeast Supreme Administrative Council" was established as a Japanese puppet organization in Manchuria following the Mukden Incident. On 16 February 1932, the Imperial Army hosted the "Founding Conference" or "Big Four Conference" with Liaoning governor Zang Shiyi, Heilongjiang governor Zhang Jinghui, commander of the Kirin Provincial Army Xi Qia, and general Ma Zhanshan, in order to establish the Northeast Administrative Committee. On the committee's second meeting, the aforementioned four plus Tang Yulin, Ling Sheng, and Qimote Semupilei were appointed as chairmen. On 18 February, the Council issued a statement announcing that "the Northeast provinces are completely independent".

On 18 February 1932 Manchukuo was proclaimed by the Northeast Supreme Administrative Council nominally in control of the region. On 25 February, the Council decided that the name of the new country name (Manchukuo), the national flag, era name, and more. Manchukuo was formally established on 1 March in Xinjing, and the council was abolished. It received formal recognition from Japan on 15 September 1932 through the Japan–Manchukuo Protocol, after the assassination of Japanese Prime Minister Inukai Tsuyoshi. The city of Changchun—renamed 新京; Xīnjīng; 'new capital'—became the capital of Manchukuo. The local Chinese organized volunteer armies to oppose the Japanese and the new state required a war lasting several years to pacify the country.

=== Nominal transition to monarchy ===
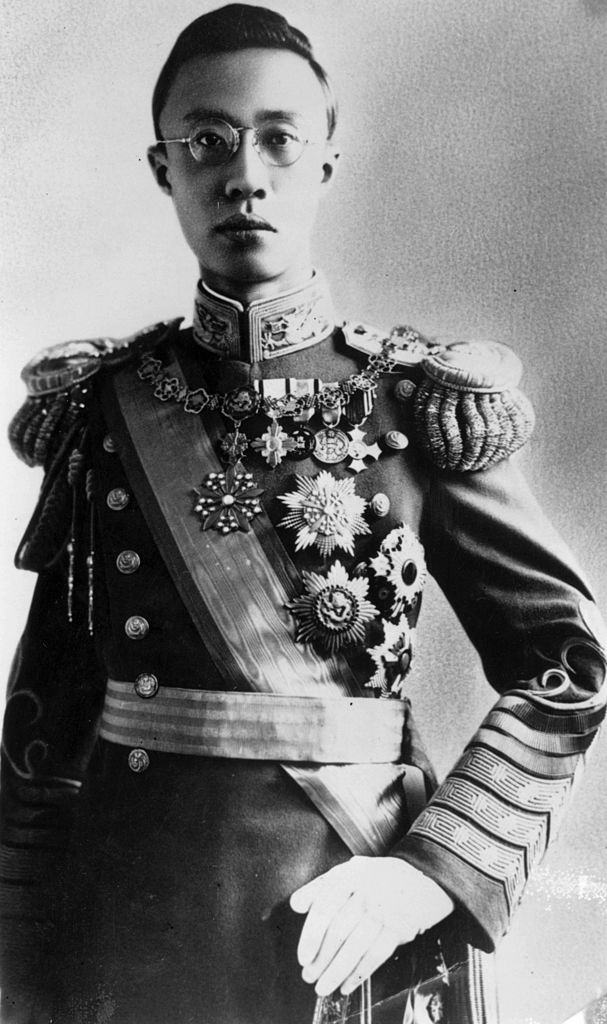
Puyi (regnal name "Kangde") as emperor of Manchukuo

Manchukuo was proclaimed a monarchy on 1 March 1934, with Puyi assuming the throne with the era name of Kangde. He was nominally assisted in his executive duties by a Privy Council and a General Affairs State Council. This State Council was the center of political power, and consisted of several cabinet ministers, each assisted by a Japanese vice-minister. The commander-in-chief of the Kwantung Army also served as the official Japanese ambassador to the state. He functioned in a manner similar to resident officers in European colonial empires, with the added ability to veto decisions by the emperor. The Kwantung Army leadership placed Japanese vice ministers in his cabinet, while all Chinese advisors gradually resigned or were dismissed.

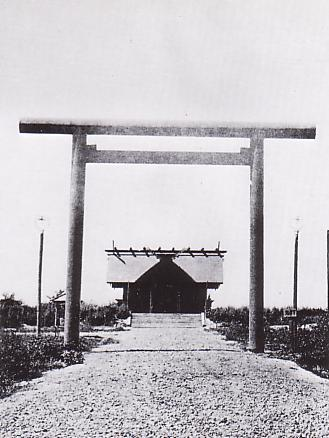
Shinto shrine in Qiqihar, Heilongjiang, taken prior to 1945

Zheng Xiaoxu served as Manchukuo's first prime minister until 1935, when Zhang Jinghui succeeded him. Puyi was nothing more than a figurehead and real authority rested in the hands of the Japanese military officials. An imperial palace was specially built for the emperor. The Manchu ministers all served as frontmen for their Japanese vice-ministers, who made all decisions.

In this manner, Japan formally detached Manchukuo from China over the course of the 1930s. With Japanese investment and rich natural resources, the area became an industrial powerhouse. Manchukuo had its own issued banknotes and postage stamps. Several independent banks were founded as well.

The conquest of Manchuria proved to be extremely popular with the Japanese people who saw the conquest as providing a much-needed economic "lifeline" to their economy which had been badly hurt by the Great Depression. The very image of a "lifeline" suggested that Manchuria—which was rich in natural resources—was essential for Japan to recover from the Great Depression, which explains why the conquest was so popular at the time and later why the Japanese people were so completely hostile towards any suggestion of letting Manchuria go. At the time, censorship in Japan was nowhere near as stringent as it would later become, and the American historian Louise Young noted: "Had they wished, it would have been possible in 1931 and 1932 for journalists and editors to express anti-war sentiments". The popularity of the conquest meant that newspapers such as the Asahi Shimbun that had initially opposed the war swiftly pivoted to support the war as the best way of improving sales. The conquest of Manchuria was also presented as resolving the "unfinished business" left over the Russo-Japanese war that finally undid one of the key terms of the Treaty of Portsmouth. The most popular song in Japan in 1932 was the Manchuria March whose verses proclaimed that the seizing of Manchuria in 1931–32 was a continuation of what Japan had fought for against Russia in 1904–05, and the ghosts of the Japanese soldiers killed in the Russo-Japanese war could now rest at ease as their sacrifices had not been in vain.

In 1935, Manchukuo purchased the Chinese Eastern Railway from the Soviet Union.

=== Second Sino-Japanese War ===
Location of Manchukuo (darker red) within the Greater East Asia Co-Prosperity Sphere, 1939

During the Second Sino-Japanese War, the Japanese used Manchukuo as a base to conduct their invasion of the rest of China. The Manchu general Tong Linge was killed in action by the Japanese in the Battle of Beiping–Tianjin, which marked the beginning of the Second Sino-Japanese War. In the summer of 1939, a border dispute between Manchukuo and the Mongolian People's Republic resulted in the Battles of Khalkhin Gol. During these battles, a combined Soviet–Mongolian force defeated a Kwantung Army with limited Manchukuoan support.

=== Soviet invasion, dissolution, and aftermath ===
On 8 August 1945, the Soviet Union declared war on Japan, in accordance with the agreement at the Yalta Conference, and invaded Manchukuo from Outer Manchuria and Outer Mongolia. During the Soviet offensive, the Manchukuo Imperial Army, on paper a 200,000-man force, performed poorly and whole units surrendered to the Soviets without firing a single shot; there were even cases of armed riots and mutinies against the Japanese forces. Puyi abdicated on 17 August and had hoped to escape to Japan to surrender to the Americans, but the Soviets captured him and eventually extradited him to the government of China, when the Chinese Communist Party (CCP) came to power in 1949, where the authorities had him imprisoned on charges of war crimes, along with all other captured Manchukuo officials.

From 1945 to 1948, Manchuria served as a base of operations for the People's Liberation Army against the National Revolutionary Army in the Chinese Civil War. The CCP used Manchuria as a staging ground until the final Nationalist retreat to Taiwan in 1949. Many Manchukuo army and Japanese Kantōgun personnel served with CCP troops during the Chinese Civil War against the Nationalist forces. Most of the 1.5 million Japanese who had been left in Manchukuo at the end of World War II were sent back to their homeland in 1946–1948 by U.S. Navy ships in the operation now known as the Japanese repatriation from Huludao.

== Politics ==
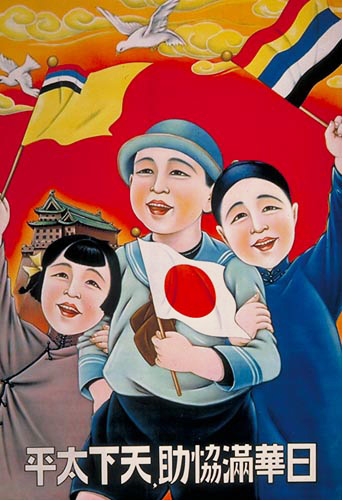
Propaganda poster promoting harmony between Japanese, Han, and Manchu peoples. The caption says, from right to left: "With the cooperation of Japan, China and Manchukuo, the world can be in peace."

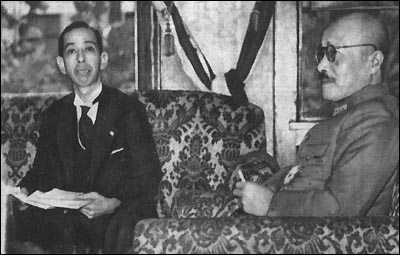
Hideki Tojo (right) with Nobusuke Kishi, the key architect of Manchukuo during 1935–39, known as the "Showa-era monster"

Historians generally consider Manchukuo a puppet state of the Empire of Japan due to the Japanese military's continued occupation of the country and its direct control over the government.

The Legislative Council was largely a ceremonial body, existing to rubber-stamp decisions issued by the State Council. The only authorized political party was the government-sponsored Concordia Association, although various émigré groups were permitted their own political associations such as the White Russian Russian Fascist Party.

The American historian Louise Young noted that one of the most striking aspects of Manchukuo was that many of the young Japanese civil servants who went to work in Manchukuo were on the left, or at least had once been. In the 1920s, much of the younger intelligentsia in Japan had rejected their parents' values and had become active in various left-wing movements. Starting with the Peace Preservation Law of 1925, which made the very act of thinking about 'altering the kokutai' a crime, the government had embarked on a sustained campaign to stomp out all left-wing thought in Japan. However, many of the bright young university graduates active in left-wing movements in Japan were needed to serve as civil servants in Manchukuo, which Young noted led the Japanese state to embark upon a contradictory policy of recruiting the same people active in the movements that it was seeking to crush." To rule Manchukuo, which right from the start had a very statist economy, the Japanese state needed university graduates who were fluent in Mandarin Chinese, and the 1920s–30s, many of the university graduates in Japan who knew Mandarin were "progressives" involved in left-wing causes. The fact that young Japanese civil servants in Manchukuo with their degrees in economics, sociology, etc., who had once been active in left-wing movements helps explain the decidedly leftist thrust of social and economic policies in Manchukuo with the state playing an increasingly large role in society. Likewise, much of the debate between Japanese civil servants about the sort of social-economic policies Japan should follow in Manchukuo in the 1930s was framed in Marxist terms, with the civil servants arguing over whether Manchuria prior to September 1931 had a "feudal" or a "capitalist" economy. The American historian Joshua Fogel wrote about the young servants of Manchukuo: "Tremendous debates transpired on such things as the nature of the Chinese economy, and the lingua franca of these debates was always Marxism". To resolve this debate, various research teams of five or six young civil servants, guarded by detachments from the Kwantung Army of about 20 or 30 men, went out to do field research in Manchukuo, gathering material about the life of ordinary people, to determine Manchukuo was in the "feudal" or "capitalist" stage of development. Starting in 1936, the Manchukuo state launched Five Year Plans for economic development, which were closely modeled after the Five Year Plans in the Soviet Union.

In theory, the Japanese were creating an entirely new, independent state, and this allowed for a considerable level of experimentation regarding the policies that the new state would be carrying out. Many university graduates in Japan who were ostensibly opposed to the social system within Japan itself, instead went to Manchukuo with the belief that they could implement reforms that might later inspire policy within Japan itself. This was especially the case since it was impossible to effect any reforms in Japan itself as the very act of thinking about "altering the kokutai" was a crime, which led many leftist Japanese university graduates to go work in Manchukuo, where they believed they could achieve the sort of social revolution that was impossible in Japan. By 1933, the Japanese state had essentially destroyed both the Japanese Socialist Party and the Japanese Communist Party via mass arrests and Tenkō with both parties reduced down to mere rumps, which caused many Japanese student leftists to draw the conclusion that change was impossible in Japan, but still possible in Manchukuo, where paradoxically the Kwantung Army was sponsoring the sort of policies that were unacceptable in Japan. Moreover, the Great Depression had made it very difficult for university graduates in Japan to find work, which made the prospect of a well-paying job in Manchukuo very attractive to otherwise underemployed Japanese university graduates. In Manchukuo, the Japanese state was creating an entire state anew, which meant that Manchukuo had a desperate need for university graduates to work in its newly founded civil service. In addition, the Pan-Asian rhetoric of Manchukuo and the prospect of Japan helping ordinary people in Manchuria greatly appealed to the idealistic youth of Japan. Young wrote about the young Japanese people who went to work in Manchukuo: "The men, and in some cases, the women, who answered the call of this land of opportunity, brought with them tremendous drive and ambition. In their efforts to remake their own lives, they remade an empire. They invested it with their preoccupations of modernity and their dreams of a Utopian future. They pushed it to embrace idealist rhetoric of social reform and justified itself in terms of Chinese nationalist aspiration. They turned it to architectural ostentation and the heady luxury of colonial consumption. They made it into a project of radical change, experimentation and possibility".

Map of Japanese Hokushin-ron plans for a potential attack on the Soviet Union. Dates indicate the year that Japan gained control of the territory.

The Kwantung Army for its part tolerated the talk of social revolution in Manchukuo as the best way of gaining support from the Han majority of Manchukuo, who did not want Manchuria to be severed from China. Even more active in going to Manchukuo were the products of Tenkō ('changing directions'), a process of brainwashing by the police of left-wing activists to make them accept that the Emperor was a god after all, whom they were best to serve. Tenko was a very successful process that turned young Japanese who once had been ardent liberals or leftists who rejected the idea that the Emperor was a god into fanatical rightists, who made up for their previous doubts about the divinity of the Emperor with militant enthusiasm. One tenkosha was Tachibana Shiraki, who had once been a Marxist Sinologist until after he was arrested and undergoing tenko became a fanatical right-winger. Tachibana went to Manchukuo in 1932, proclaiming that the theory of the "five races" working together was the best solution to Asia's problems and argued in his writings that only Japan could save China from itself, which was a complete change from his previous policies, where he criticized Japan for exploiting China. Other left-wing activists like Ohgami Suehiro did not undergo tenko, but still went to work in Manchukuo, believing it was possible to effect social reforms that would end the "semi-feudal" condition of the Chinese peasants of Manchukuo, and that he could use the Kwantung Army to effect left-wing reforms in Manchukuo. Ohgami went to work in the "agricultural economy" desk of the Social Research Unit of the South Manchurian Railroad company, writing up reports about the rural economy of Manchukuo that were used by the Kwantung Army and the Manchukuo state. Ohgami believed that his studies helped ordinary people, citing one study he did about water use in rural Manchukuo, where he noted a correlation between villages that were deprived of water and "banditry" (the codeword for anti-Japanese guerrillas), believing that the policy of improving water supply in villages was due to his study. The outbreak of the war with China in 1937 caused the state in Manchukuo to grow even bigger as a policy of "total war" came in, which meant there was a pressing demand for people with university degrees trained to think "scientifically". Fogel wrote that almost all of the university graduates from Japan who arrived in Manchukuo in the late 1930s were "largely left-wing Socialists and Communists. This was precisely at the time when Marxism had been all but banned in Japan, when (as Yamada Gōichi put) "if the expression shakai [social] appeared in the title of a book, it was usually confiscated".

Young also noted—with reference to Lord Acton's dictum that "Absolute power corrupts absolutely"—that for many of the idealistic young Japanese civil servants, who believed that they could affect a "revolution from above" that would make the lives of ordinary people better, that the absolute power that they enjoyed over millions of people "went to their heads", causing them to behave with abusive arrogance towards the very people that they had gone to Manchukuo to help. Young wrote that it was a "monumental conceit" of the part of the young idealists to believe that they could use the Kwantung Army to achieve a "revolution from above" when it was the Kwantung Army that was using them. The ambitious plans for land reform in Manchukuo were vetoed by the Kwantung Army for precisely the reason that it might inspire similar reforms in Japan. The landlords in Japan tended to come from families who once belonged to the samurai caste, and almost all of the officers in the Imperial Japanese Army came from samurai families, which made the Kwantung Army very hostile towards any sort of land reform which might serve as an example for Japanese peasants. In October 1941, the Soviet spy ring headed by Richard Sorge was uncovered in Tokyo, which caused the authorities to become paranoid about Soviet espionage, and led to a new crackdown on the left. In November 1941, the Social Research Unit of the South Manchurian Railroad Company, which was well known as a hotbed of Marxism since the early 1930s, was raided by the Kenpeitai, who arrested 50 of those working in the Social Research Unit. At least 44 of those working in the Social Research Unit were convicted of violating the Peace Preservation Law, which made thinking about "altering the kokutai" a crime in 1942–43 and were given long prison sentences, of whom four died due to the harsh conditions of prisons in Manchukuo. As the men working in the Social Research Unit had played important roles in Manchukuo's economic policy and were university graduates from good families, the Japanese historian Hotta Eri wrote that the Kenpeitai was ordered to "handle them with care", meaning no torture of the sort that the Kenpeitai normally employed in its investigations.

When the Japanese surrender was announced on 15 August 1945, Puyi agreed to abdicate.

=== Head of state ===
Emperor of Manchukuo
- 大滿洲帝國皇帝 (Chinese)
- Imperial
- Imperial standard

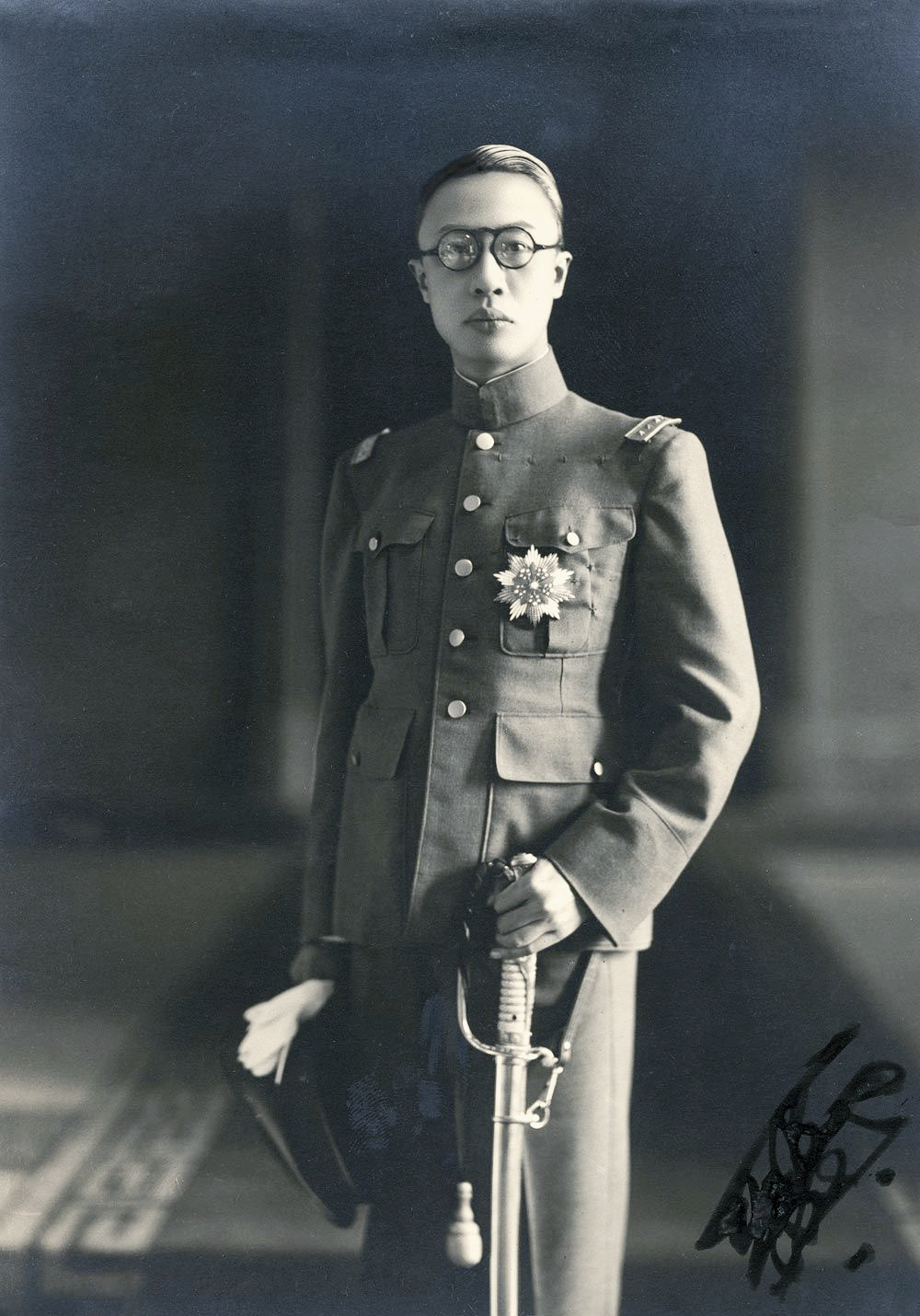

Details
- Style: His Imperial Majesty
- First monarch: Kangde
- Last monarch: Kangde
- Formed: 1 March 1934
- Abolished: 15 August 1945
- Residences: Imperial Palace, Xinjing

Manchukuo 1932–1945
Personal name and dates of birth and death	Period of reign	Era names and their corresponding range of dates	Name of the title	Dates
All given names in **bold**.
Aisin-Gioro **Puyi** 愛新覺羅溥儀; Àixīnjuéluó Pǔyì; 7 February 1906 – 17 October 1967	18 February 1932 – 15 August 1945 (13 years, 178 days)	Datong (大同; Dàtóng)	Chief Executive of Manchukuo (滿洲國執政)	18 February 1932 – 28 February 1934
Aisin-Gioro **Puyi** 愛新覺羅溥儀; Àixīnjuéluó Pǔyì; 7 February 1906 – 17 October 1967	18 February 1932 – 15 August 1945 (13 years, 178 days)	Kangde (康德; Kāngdé)	Emperor of Manchukuo (大滿洲帝國皇帝)	1 March 1934 – 15 August 1945

=== Prime minister ===
No.	Portrait	Name (birth–death)	Term of office			Political party
No.	Portrait	Name (birth–death)	Took office	Left office	Time in office	Political party
1		**Zheng Xiaoxu** (1860–1938)	9 March 1932	21 May 1935	3 years, 73 days	Concordia Association
2		**Zhang Jinghui** (1871–1959)	21 May 1935	15 August 1945	10 years, 86 days	Concordia Association

=== Administrative divisions ===
Manchukuo was initially divided into three provinces. This number increased to five in 1934 when Sanjiang and Heihe were split off from Longjiang Province. A special ward of Beiman (Chinese: 北滿特別區) existed between 1 July 1933 and 1 January 1936. In 1941, Manchukuo was reorganized into 19 provinces, with the two special cities of Xinjing and Harbin. Each province was in turn divided in four (Xing'an dong) and 24 (Fengtian) prefectures. Harbin was later incorporated into Binjiang province. Andong and Jinzhou provinces separated themselves from Fengtian while Binjiang and Jiandao separated themselves from Jilin in the same year.

=== Cabinet of Zheng Xiaoxu (1932–1935) ===
- Puyi — Chief Executive/Emperor (1932–1945)
- Zheng Xiaoxu — Prime Minister (1932–1935)
- Zang Shiyi — Minister of Civil Affairs (early 1930s)
- Xie Jieshi — Minister of Finance (early 1930s)
- Zhang Jinghui — Senior official (later became Prime Minister, 1935–1945)

=== Cabinet of Zhang Jinghui (1935–1945) ===
- Puyi — Emperor/Head of State (1934–1945)
- Zhang Jinghui — Prime Minister (1935–1945)
- Zang Shiyi — Minister of Civil Affairs (1930s–1940s)
- Xie Jieshi — Minister of Finance (1930s)
- Ding Jianxiu — Minister of Communications (approx. 1930s–1940s)
- Yu Zhishan — Minister of Military Affairs (1930s)

== Economy ==
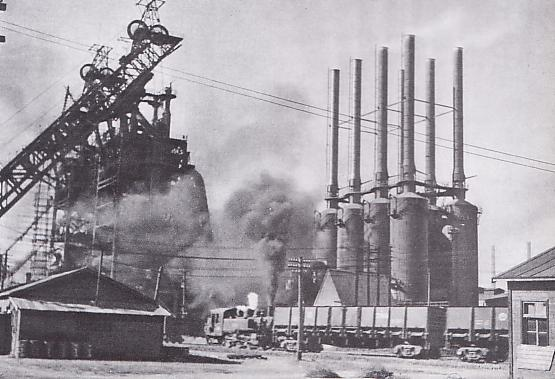
Showa Steel Works in the early 1940s

Manchukuo experienced rapid economic growth. During the 1920s, the Japanese Army under the influence of the Wehrstaat (Defense State) theories popular with the Reichswehr had started to advocate their own version of the Wehrstaat, the totalitarian "national defense state" which would mobilize an entire society for war in peacetime. At least part of the reason the Kwantung Army seized Manchuria in 1931 was to use it as a laboratory for creating an economic system geared towards the "national defense state"; colonial Manchuria offered possibilities for the army to force drastic economic changes that were not possible in Japan.

Industrial development in Manchukuo was accomplished with state planning and Japanese investment, prioritizing military build-up and heavy industry without an emphasis on profitability.

From the beginning, the Army intended to turn Manchukuo into the industrial heartland of the empire. Economic planning in Manchukuo was influenced by Japanese observations of the Soviet approach to catch-up industrialization and reflected in Manchukuo's Five Year Plan for Heavy Industry. The development of industry in Manchukuo further influenced Japanese economic mobilization following the start of the Second Sino-Japanese War.

The Zaibatsu were excluded from Manchukuo and all of the heavy industrial factories were built and owned by Army-owned corporations. In 1935, there was a change when the "reform bureaucrat" Nobusuke Kishi was appointed Deputy Minister of Industrial Development. Kishi persuaded the Army to allow the zaibatsu to invest in Manchukuo, arguing that having the state carry out the entire industrialization of Manchukuo was costing too much money. Kishi pioneered an elitist system where bureaucrats such as himself developed economic plans, which the zaibatsu had to then carry out. Kishi succeeded in marshaling private capital in a very strongly state-directed economy to achieve his goal of vastly increased industrial production while at the same time displaying utter indifference to the exploited Chinese workers toiling in Manchukuo's factories; the American historian Mark Driscoll described Kishi's system as a "necropolitical" system where the Chinese workers were literally treated as dehumanized cogs within a vast industrial machine. The system that Kishi pioneered in Manchuria of a state-guided economy where corporations made their investments on government orders later served as the model for Japan's post-1945 development, albeit not with same level of brutal exploitation as in Manchukuo. By the 1930s, Manchukuo's industrial system was among the most advanced making it one of the industrial powerhouses in the region. Manchukuo's steel production exceeded Japan's in the late 1930s. Many Manchurian cities were modernized during the Manchukuo era.

Much of the country's economy was often subordinated to Japanese interests and, during the war, raw material flowed into Japan to support the war effort. Traditional lands were taken and redistributed to Japanese farmers with local farmers relocated and forced into collective farming units over smaller areas of land. Chinese workers were the target of pervasive discrimination. Japanese and Manchukuo authorities used Chinese prisoners of war for forced labor.

=== Transportation ===
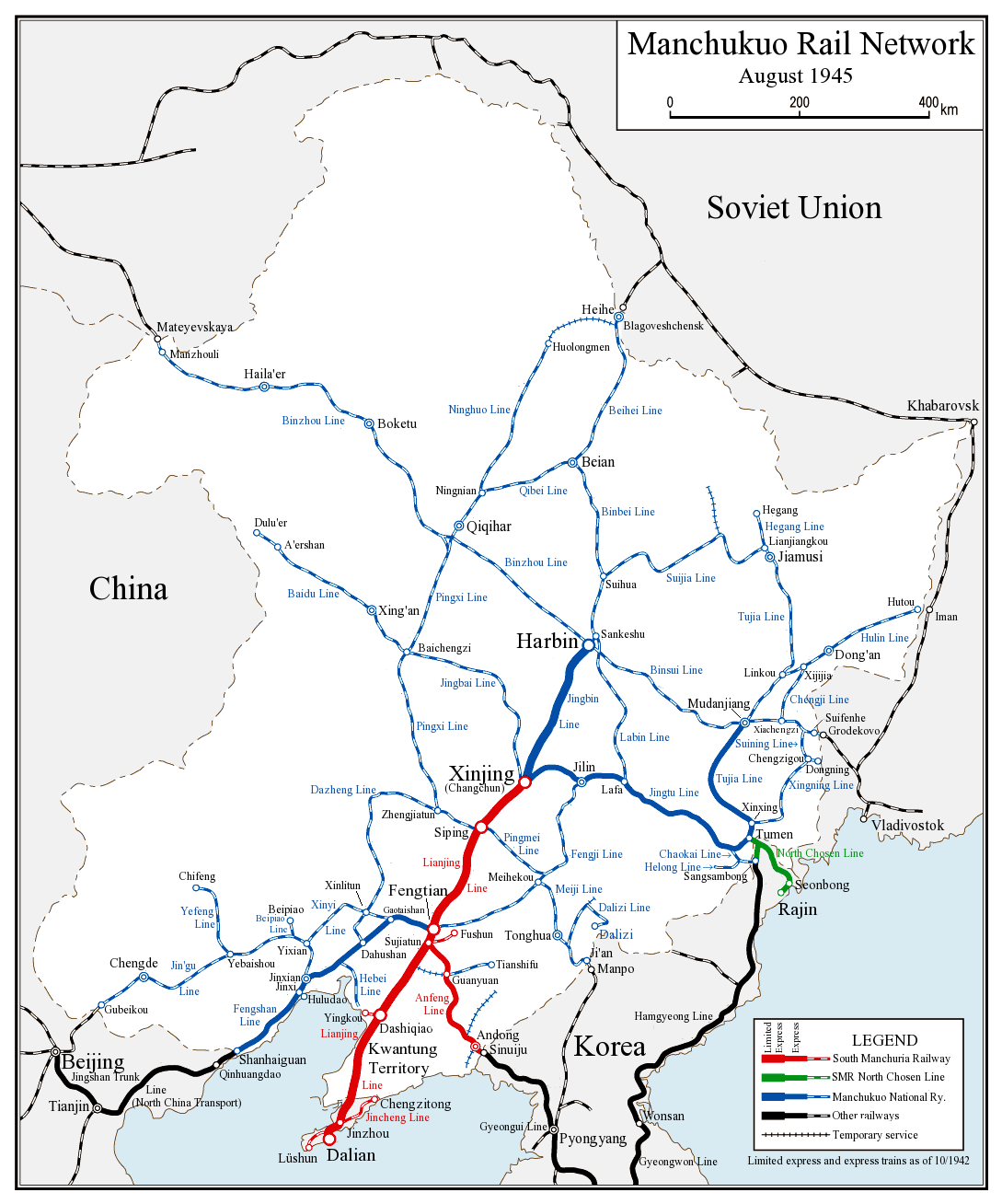
Manchukuoan railways in 1945

When Manchukuo was founded as a Japanese puppet state, it inherited the railroad network of Manchuria that was built originally during an economic and military struggle between Russia and Japan over Chinese territory and became a focal point before and after the Russo-Japanese War. Chinese warlords had also aimed to build local lines when possible. Manchukuo's railroad system would consist mainly of the South Manchuria Railway, a Japanese concession in the Republic of China, and the Chinese Eastern Railway, a Russian concession which was still owned by the Soviet Union inside Manchukuo. The Soviet Union sold the Chinese Eastern Railway to Japanese Manchukuo in 1935, giving Japan and Manchukuo full control over the railroads of Manchuria.

The Japanese built an efficient railway system that still functions well today. Known as the South Manchuria Railway or Mantetsu, this large corporation came to own large stakes in many industrial projects throughout the region. Mantetsu personnel were involved in the economic exploitation of occupied China during World War II, and colonial planning at the behest of the Imperial Japanese Army. Many railway lines in Manchukuo were owned by the Manchukuo National Railway. After 1933, the Manchukuo National Railway was fully owned by the South Manchuria Railway/Mantetsu. Mantetsu had close to monopoly status and its properties were guarded by the Kwantung Army.

By the end of World War II, the South Manchuria Railway owned 70 companies and employed about 340,000 people in Manchukuo and occupied China.

== Demographics ==
Administrative divisions of Manchukuo in 1938

In 1908, the number of residents was 15,834,000, which rose to 30,000,000 in 1931 and 43,000,000 for the Manchukuo state. The population balance remained 123 men to 100 women and the total number in 1941 was 50,000,000.

In early 1934, the total population of Manchukuo was estimated as 30,880,000, with 6.1 persons the average family, and 122 men for each 100 women. These numbers included 29,510,000 Chinese (96%, which should have included the Manchu people), 590,760 Japanese (2%), 680,000 Koreans (2%), and 98,431 (<1%) of other nationality: White Russians, Mongols, etc. Around 80% of the population was rural. During the existence of Manchukuo, the ethnic balance did not change significantly, except that Japan increased the Korean population in China. From Japanese sources come these numbers: in 1940 the total population in Manchukuo of Longjiang, Rehe, Jilin, Fengtian, and Xing'an provinces at 43,233,954; or an Interior Ministry figure of 31,008,600. Another figure of the period estimated the total population as 36,933,000 residents. The majority of Han Chinese in Manchukuo believed that Manchuria was rightfully part of China, and they both passively and violently resisted Japan's propaganda that Manchukuo was a "multinational state".

After the Russian Civil War (1917–1922), thousands of Russians fled to Manchuria to join the Russian community already there. The Russians living in Manchuria were stateless and as whites had an ambiguous status in Manchukuo, which was meant to be a Pan-Asian state, whose official "five races" were the Chinese, Mongols, Manchus, Koreans, and Japanese. At various times, the Japanese suggested that the Russians might be a "sixth race" of Manchukuo, but this was never officially declared. In 1936, the Manchukuo Almanac reported that were 33,592 Russians living in the city of Harbin—the "Moscow of the Orient"—and of whom only 5,580 had been granted Manchukuo citizenship. Japanese imperialism was to a certain extent based on racism with the Japanese as the "great Yamato race", but there was always a certain dichotomy in Japanese thinking between an ideology based on racial differences based on bloodlines versus the idea of Pan-Asianism with Japan as the natural leader of all the Asian peoples. In 1940, ethnic Russians were included among the other nationalities of Manchukuo as candidates for conscription into the Manchukuo military. Until World War II, the Japanese tended to leave alone those travelling to Manchukuo with a passport as they did not like to deal with protests from embassies in Tokyo about the mistreatment of their citizens. The Kwantung Army operated a secret biological-chemical warfare unit based in Pinfang, Unit 731, that performed gruesome experiments on people involving much evisceration of the subjects to see the effects of chemicals and germs on the human body. In the late 1930s, the doctors of Unit 731 demanded more European subjects to experiment upon in order to test the efficiency the strains of anthrax and plague that they were developing, leading to a great many of the Russians living in Manchukuo becoming the unwilling human guinea pigs of Unit 731. The Russian Fascist Party, which worked with the Japanese, was used to kidnap various "unreliable" Russians living in Manchukuo for Unit 731 to experiment upon.

The children of the Russian exiles often married Han Chinese, and the resulting children were always known in Manchukuo as "mixed water" people, and were shunned by both the Russian and Chinese communities. Chinese accounts, both at the time and later, tended to portray the Russians living in Manchuria as all prostitutes and thieves, and almost always ignored the contributions made by middle-class Russians to community life. Mindful of the way that Americans and most Europeans enjoyed extraterritorial rights in China at the time, accounts in Chinese literature about the Russians living in Manchukuo and their "mixed water" children often display a certain schadenfreude recounting how the Russians in Manchukuo usually lived in poverty on the margins of Manchukuo society with the local Chinese more economically successful. The South Korean historian Bong Inyoung noted when it came to writing about the "mixed water" people, Chinese writers tended to treat them as not entirely Chinese, but on the other hand were willing to accept these people as Chinese provided that would totally embrace Chinese culture by renouncing their Russian heritage, thus making Chineseness as much a matter of culture as of race.

Around the same time the Soviet Union was advocating the Siberian Jewish Autonomous Oblast across the Manchukuo-Soviet border, some Japanese officials investigated a plan (known as the Fugu Plan) to attract Jewish refugees to Manchukuo as part of their colonisation effort, which was never adopted as official policy. The Jewish community in Manchukuo was not subjected to the official persecution that Jews experienced under Japan's ally Nazi Germany, and Japanese authorities were involved in closing down local anti-Semitic publications such as the Russian Fascist Party's newspaper Nash Put. However, Jews in Manchukuo were victims of harassment by antisemitic elements among the White Russian population, one notable incident being the murder of Simon Kaspé. In 1937 the Far Eastern Jewish Council was created, chaired by the Harbin Jewish community leader Dr. Abraham Kaufman. Between 1937 and 1939 the city of Harbin in Manchukuo was the location of the Conference of Jewish Communities in the Far East. Following the Russian Red Army's invasion of Manchuria in 1945, Dr. Kaufman and several other Jewish community leaders were arrested by the Soviets and charged with anti-Soviet activities, resulting in Kaufman's imprisonment for ten years in a Soviet labor camp.

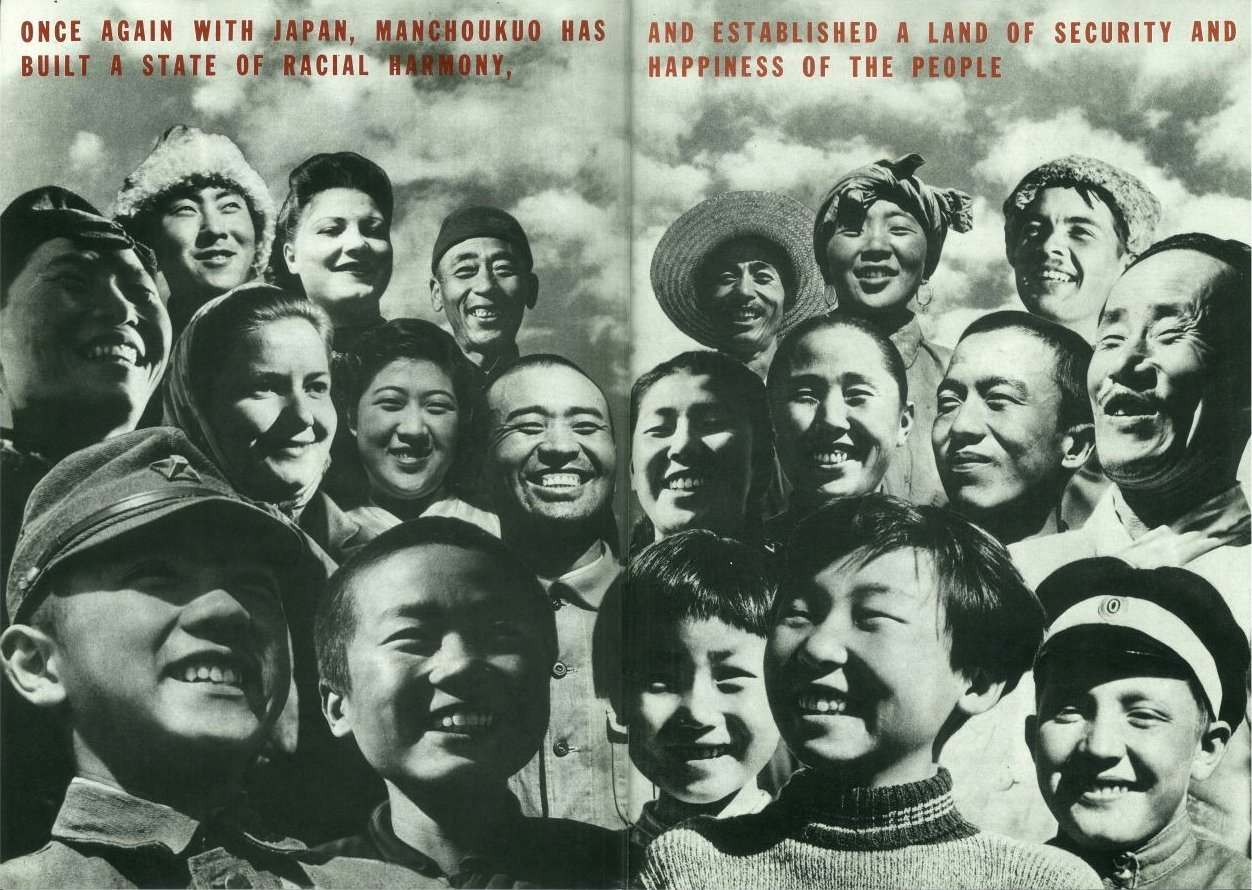
A Manchukuo propaganda poster promoting ''racial harmony'' displaying European and East Asian ethnic groups

The Japanese Ueda Kyōsuke labeled all 30 million people in Manchuria as "Manchus", including Han Chinese, despite the fact that most of them were not ethnic Manchu, and the Japanese written, "Great Manchukuo" built upon Ueda's argument to claim that all 30 million "Manchus" in Manchukuo had the right to independence to justify splitting Manchukuo from China. In 1942 the Japanese wrote "Ten Year History of the Construction of Manchukuo" which attempted to emphasize the right of ethnic Japanese to the land of Manchukuo while attempting to delegitimize the Manchu's claim to Manchukuo as their native land, noting that most Manchus moved out during the Qing period and only returned later.

=== Population of main cities ===
- Niuzhuang (119,000 or 180,871 in 1940)
- Mukden (339,000 or 1,135,801 in 1940)
- Xinjing (126,000 or 544,202 in 1940)
- Harbin (405,000 or 661,948 in 1940)
- Andong (92,000 or 315,242 in 1940)
- Kirin (119,000 or 173,624 in 1940)
- Tsitsihar (75,000 in 1940)

Source: Beal, Edwin G (1945). "The 1940 Census of Manchuria". The Far Eastern Quarterly. 4 (3): 243–262. doi:10.2307/2049515. JSTOR 2049515. S2CID 166016710.

=== Japanese population ===
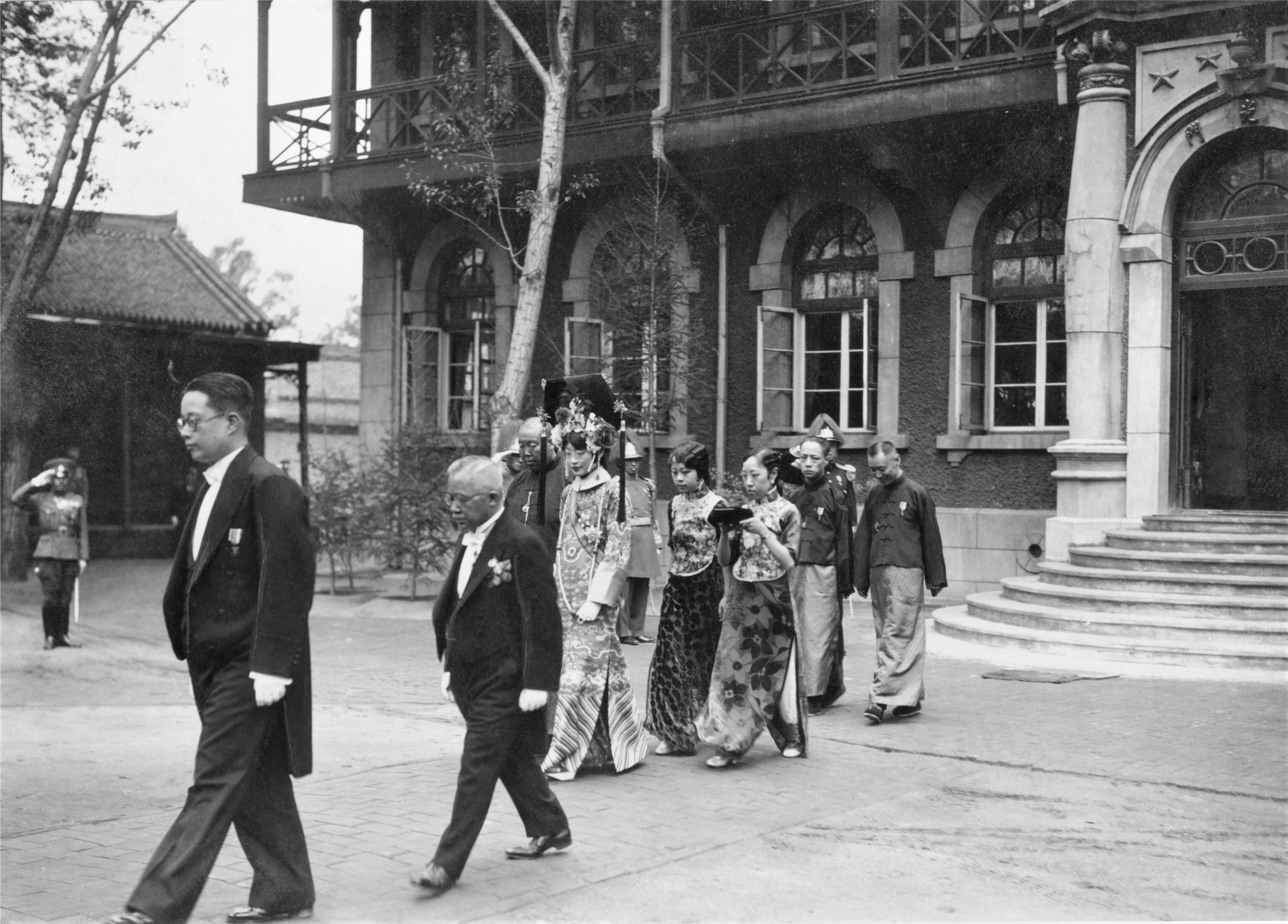
The Empress of Manchukuo taking part in a procession during a visit by Japanese officials, 1934

In 1931–1932, there were 100,000 Japanese farmers; other sources mention 590,760 Japanese inhabitants. Other figures for Manchukuo speak of a Japanese population 240,000 strong, later growing to 837,000. In Xinjing, they made up 25% of the population. Accordingly, to the census of 1936, of the Japanese population of Manchukuo, 22% were civil servants and their families; 18% were working for the South Manchurian Railroad company; 25% had come to Manchukuo to establish a business, and 21% had come to work in industry. The Japanese working in the fields of transportation, the government, and in business tended to be middle class, white-collar people such as executives, engineers, and managers, and those Japanese who working in Manchukuo as blue-collar employees tended to be skilled workers. In 1934, it was reported that a Japanese carpenter working in Manchukuo with its growing economy could earn twice as much as he could in Japan. With its gleaming modernist office buildings, state of the art transport networks like the famous Asia Express railroad line, and modern infrastructure that was going up all over Manchukuo, Japan's newest colony became a popular tourist destination for middle-class Japanese, who wanted to see the "Brave New Empire" that was going up in the mainland of Asia. The Japanese government had official plans projecting the emigration of 5 million Japanese to Manchukuo between 1936 and 1956. Between 1938 and 1942 a batch of young farmers of 200,000 arrived in Manchukuo; joining this group after 1936 were 20,000 complete families. Of the Japanese settlers in Manchukuo, almost half came from the rural areas of Kyushu. When Japan lost sea and air control of the Yellow Sea in 1943–44, this migration stopped.

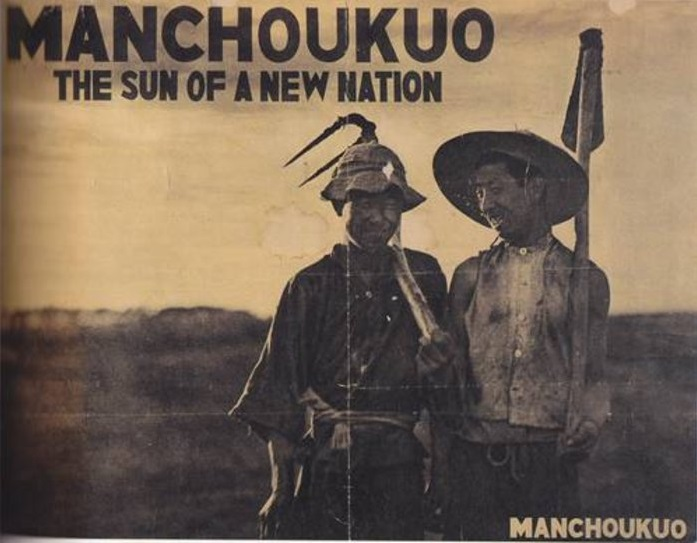
Propaganda poster for European audiences, featuring a pair of Japanese settlers

About 2% of the Japanese population worked in agriculture. Many had been young, land-poor farmers in Japan that were recruited by the Patriotic Youth Brigade to colonize new settlements in Manchukuo. The Manchukuo government had seized great portions of these land through "price manipulation, coerced sales and forced evictions". Some Japanese settlers gained so much land that they could not farm it themselves and had to hire Chinese or Korean laborers for help, or even lease some of it back to its former Chinese owners, leading to uneasy, sometimes hostile relations between the groups.

When the Red Army invaded Manchukuo, they captured 850,000 Japanese settlers. With the exception of some civil servants and soldiers, these were repatriated to Japan in 1946–7. Many Japanese orphans in China were left behind in the confusion by the Japanese government and were adopted by Chinese families. Many, however, integrated well into Chinese society. In the 1980s Japan began to organize a repatriation program for them but not all chose to go back to Japan.

The majority of Japanese left behind in China were women, and these Japanese women mostly married Chinese men and became known as "stranded war wives" (zanryu fujin). Because they had children fathered by Chinese men, the Japanese women were not allowed to bring their Chinese families back with them to Japan, so most of them stayed. Japanese law allowed children fathered only by Japanese to become Japanese citizens.

== Legal system ==
Although the League of Nations ruled that Japan had broken international law by seizing Manchuria, the Japanese invested much effort into giving Manchukuo a legal system, believing that this was the fastest way for international recognition of Manchukuo. A particular problem for the Japanese was that Manchukuo was always presented as a new type of state: a multi-ethnic Pan-Asian state comprising Japanese, Koreans, Manchus, Mongols and Chinese to mark the birth of the "New Order in Asia". Typical of the rhetoric surrounding Manchukuo was always portrayed as the birth of a glorious new civilization was the press release issued by the Japanese Information Service on 1 March 1932 announcing the "glorious advent" of Manchukuo with the "eyes of the world turned on it" proclaimed that the birth of Manchukuo was an "epochal event of far-reaching consequences in world history, marking the birth of a new era in government, racial relations, and other affairs of general interest. Never in the chronicles of the human species was any State born with such high ideals, and never has any State accomplished so much in such a brief space of its existence as Manchukuo".

The Japanese went out of their way to try to ensure that Manchukuo was the embodiment of modernity in all of its aspects, as it was intended to prove to the world what the Asian peoples could accomplish if they worked together. Manchukuo's legal system was based upon the Organic Law of 1932, which featured a 12 article Human Rights Protection Law and a supposedly independent judiciary to enforce the law. The official ideology of Manchukuo was the wangdao ("Kingly Way") devised by a former mandarin under the Qing turned Prime Minister of Manchukuo Zheng Xiaoxu calling for an ordered Confucian society that would promote justice and harmony that was billed at the time as the beginning of a new era in world history. The purpose of the law in Manchukuo was not the protection of the rights of the individual, as the wangdao ideology was expressly hostile towards individualism, which was seen as a decadent European concept inimical to Asia, but rather the interests of the state by ensuring that subjects fulfilled their duties to the emperor. The wangdao favored the collective over the individual, as the wangdao called for all people to put the needs of society ahead of their own needs. Zheng together with the Japanese legal scholar Ishiwara Kanji in a joint statement attacked the European legal tradition for promoting individualism, which they claimed led to selfishness, greed and materialism, and argued that the wangdao with its disregard for the individual was a morally superior system. The seemingly idealistic Human Rights Protection Law counterbalanced the "rights" of the subjects with their "responsibilities" to the state with a greater emphasis on the latter, just as was the case in Japan. The wangdao promoted Confucian morality and spirituality, which was seen as coming down from Emperor Puyi, and as such, the legal system existed to serve the needs of the state headed by Emperor Puyi, who could change the laws as he saw fit.

Initially, the judges who had served the Zhangs were retained, but in 1934, the Judicial Law College headed by the Japanese judge Furuta Masatake was opened in Changchun, to be replaced by a larger Law University in 1937. Right from the start, the new applicants vastly exceeded the number of openings as the first class of the Law College numbered only 100, but 1,210 students had applied. The legal system that the students were trained was closely modeled after the Japanese legal system, which in its turn was modeled after the French legal system, but there were a number of particularities unique to Manchukuo. Law students were trained to write essays on such topics as the "theory of the harmony of the five races [of Manchukuo]", the "political theory of the Kingly Way", "practical differences between consular jurisdiction and extraterritoriality", and how best to "realize the governance of the Kingly Way". The Japanese professors were "astonished" by the "enthusiasm" which the students wrote their essays on these subjects as the students expressed the hope that the wangdao was a uniquely Asian solution to the problems of the modern world, and that Manchukuo represented nothing less than the beginning of a new civilization that would lead to a utopian society in the near future. The Japanese professors were greatly impressed with the Confucian idealism of their students, but noted that their students all used stock phrases to the extent it was hard to tell their essays apart, cited examples of wise judges from ancient China while ignoring more recent legal developments, and were long on expressing idealistic statements about how the wangdao would lead to a perfect society, but were short on how explaining just how this was to be done in practice.

An example of the extent of Japanese influence on the legal system of Manchukuo was that every issue of the Manchukuo Legal Advisory Journal always contained a summary of the most recent rulings by the Supreme Court of Japan, and the reasons why the Japanese Supreme Court had ruled in these cases. However, there were some differences between the Manchukuo and Japanese legal systems. In Japan itself, corporal punishment had been abolished as part of the successful effort to end the extraterritorial rights enjoyed by citizens of the European powers but retained for the Japanese colonies of Korea and Taiwan. However, corporal punishment, especially flogging, was a major part of the Manchukuo legal system with judges being very much inclined to impose floggings on low-income Chinese men convicted of minor offenses that would normally merit only a fine or a short prison sentence in Japan. Writing in a legal journal in 1936, Ono Jitsuo, a Japanese judge serving in Manchukuo, regretted having to impose floggings as a punishment for relatively minor crimes but argued that it was necessary of Manchukuo's 30 million people "more than half are ignorant and completely illiterate barbarians" who were too poor to pay fines and too numerous to imprison. In Taiwan and Korea, Japanese law was supreme, but judges in both colonies had to respect "local customs" in regard to family law. In the case of Manchukuo, a place with a Han majority, but that ideology proclaimed the "five races" of Japanese, Chinese, Koreans, Manchus, and Mongols as all equal, this led in effect to several family laws for each of the "five races" respecting their "local customs" plus the Russian and Hui Muslim minorities.

=== Policing ===
The Manchukuo police had the power to arrest without charge anyone who was engaged in the vaguely defined crime of "undermining the state". Manchukuo had an extensive system of courts at four levels staffed by a mixture of Chinese and Japanese judges. All of the courts had both two Japanese and two Chinese judges with the Chinese serving as the nominal superior judges and the Japanese the junior judges, but in practice the Japanese judges were the masters and the Chinese judges puppets. Despite the claims that the legal system of Manchukuo was a great improvement over the legal system presided over by Marshal Zhang Xueliang the "Young Marshal", the courts in Manchukuo were inefficient and slow, and ignored by the authorities whenever it suited them. In Asia, the rule of law and an advanced legal system are commonly seen as one of the marks of "civilization", which is why the chaotic and corrupt legal system run by Marshal Zhang was denigrated so much by the Japanese and Manchukuo media. In the early 1930s, Manchukuo attracted much legal talent from Japan as Japanese Pan-Asian idealists went to Manchuria with the goal of establishing a world-class legal system. As the Kwantung Army had the ultimate power in Manchukuo, the best Japanese judges by the late 1930s preferred not to go to Manchukuo where their decisions could be constantly second-guessed, and instead only the second-rate judges went to Manchukuo. By 1937 the Japanese judges and lawyers in Manchukuo were either disillusioned Pan-Asian idealists or more commonly cynical opportunists and mediocre hacks who lacked the talent to get ahead in Japan. By contrast, the best of the ethnic Chinese law schools' graduates in Manchukuo chose to work as part of Manchukuo's judicial system, suggesting many middle-class Chinese families were prepared to accept Manchukuo. White Russian emigres were recruited into the mountain forest police and the border police forces in the early 1930s.

Starting with the Religions Law of May 1938, a cult of Emperor-worship closely modeled after the Imperial cult in Japan where Hirohito was worshiped as a living god, began in Manchukuo. Just as in Japan, schoolchildren began their classes by praying to a portrait of the emperor while imperial rescripts, and the imperial regalia become sacred relics imbued with magical powers by being associated with the god-emperor. As the Emperor Puyi was considered to be a living god, his will could not be limited by any law, and the purpose of the law was starkly reduced down to serving the will of the emperor rather than upholding values and rules. As in Japan, the idea governing the legal philosophy in Manchukuo was the Emperor was a living god who was responsible to no-one and who delegated some of his powers down to mere human beings who had the duty of obeying the will of the god-emperors. In Japan and Manchukuo, the actions of the god-emperors were always just and moral because gods could never do wrong, rather than because the god-emperors were acting to uphold moral values that existed a priori.

Again following the Japanese system, in 1937 a new category of "thought crime" was introduced declaring that certain thoughts were now illegal and those thinking these forbidden thoughts were "thought criminals". People were thus convicted not for their actions, but merely for their thoughts. After the war with China began in July 1937, an "emergency law" was declared in Manchukuo, placing it under a type of martial law that suspended the theoretical civil liberties that existed up to that point, ordered the mobilization of society for total war, and increased the tempo of repression with the law on "thought crimes" being merely the most dramatic example. In April 1938, a new type of Special Security Court was created for those charged with the five types of "thought crime". On 26 August 1941, a new security law ruled that those tried before the Special Security Courts had no right of appeal or to a defense lawyer. One Special Security Court in Jinzhou between 1942 and 1945 sentenced about 1,700 people to death and another 2,600 for life imprisonment for "thought crimes", a figure that appears to be typical of the special courts. The police frequently used torture to obtain confessions and those tried in the Special Security Courts had no right to examine the evidence against them. Starting in 1943 the number of those tried and convicted by the courts rose drastically, though the number of death sentences remained stable. The rise in the number of convictions was due to the need for slave labor for the factories and mines of Manchukuo as the traditional supplies of slave labor from northern China were disturbed by World War II as most of those convicted were sentenced to work in the factories and mines. The American historian Thomas David Dubois wrote the legal system of Manchukuo went through two phases: the first lasting from 1931 to 1937, when the Japanese wanted to show the world a state with an ultra-modern legal system that was meant to be a shining tribute to Asians working together in brotherhood; and the second from 1937 to 1945 when the legal system becomes more of a tool for the totalitarian mobilization of society for total war.

== Military ==
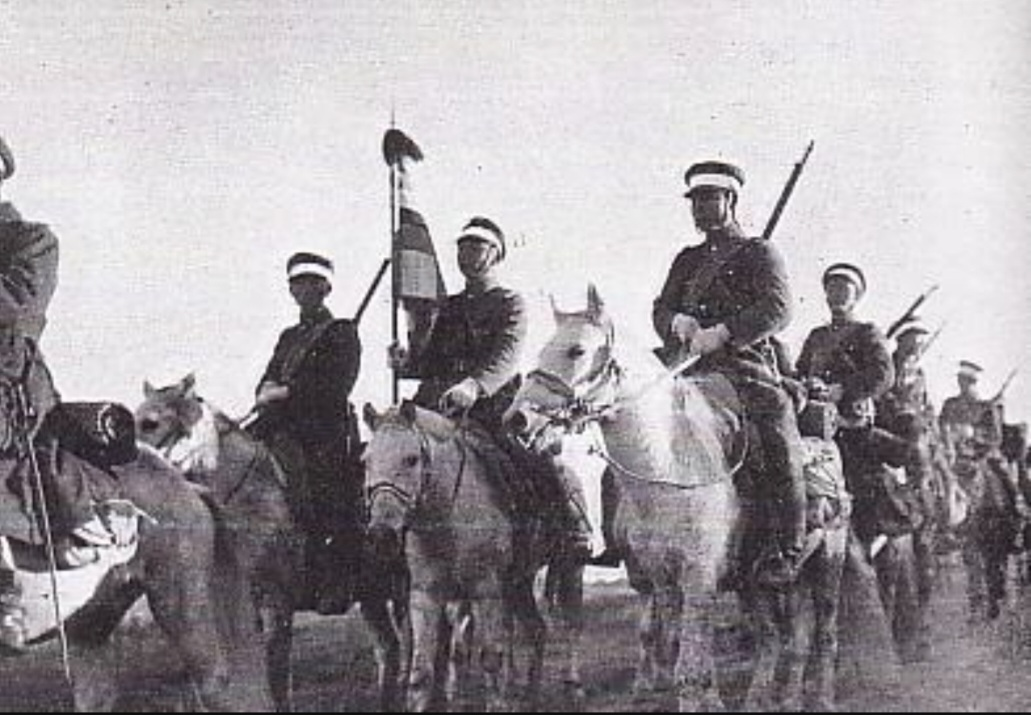
Cavalry of the Manchukuo Imperial Army

The Manchukuo Imperial Army was the ground component of Manchukuo's armed forces and consisted of as many as 170,000 to 220,000 troops at its peak in 1945 by some estimates, having formally been established by the Army and Navy Act of 15 April 1932. The majority of the soldiers were Manchurian-born Han Chinese, with smaller groups of Koreans, Mongols, and White Russian emigres, who were all trained and led by Japanese instructors and advisors. Despite the numerous attempts by the Japanese to improve the combat capability of the Imperial Army and instill a Manchukuoan patriotic spirit among its troops, most of its units were regarded as unreliable by Japanese officers. Their main role was to fight Nationalist and Communist insurgents who continued to resist the Japanese occupation of northeastern China, and occasionally the Manchukuo Imperial Army took part in operations against the Chinese National Revolutionary Army and the Soviet Red Army (in support of the Imperial Japanese Army). Initially its members were former soldiers of Marshal Zhang Xueliang's warlord army who had surrendered to Japan during the Japanese invasion of Manchuria. But since the Young Marshal's former troops were not sufficiently loyal to the new regime and performed poorly against partisans, the new government of Manchukuo took efforts to recruit—and later draft—new soldiers. In 1934 a law was passed stating that only those that had been trained by the government of Manchukuo could serve as officers. The Military Supplies Requisition Law of 13 May 1937 allowed Japanese and Manchukuo authorities to draft forced laborers. The actual calling up of conscripts for the army did not begin until 1940, at which point all youths received a physical and 10% were to be selected for service. Between 1938 and 1940, several military academies were established to provide a new officer corps for the Imperial Army, including a specific school for ethnic Mongols and one for White Russians.

A Type 41 75 mm mountain gun during an Imperial Army exercise

After fighting against insurgents during the early to mid-1930s, the Manchukuo Imperial Army played mainly a supporting role during the actions in Inner Mongolia against Chinese forces, with news reports stating that some Manchukuoan units performed fairly well. Later it fought against the Soviet Red Army during the Soviet–Japanese border conflicts. A skirmish between Manchukuoan and Mongolian cavalry in May 1939 escalated as both sides brought in reinforcements and began the Battle of Khalkhin Gol. Although they did not perform well in the battle overall, the Japanese considered their actions useful enough to warrant expansion of the Manchukuo Army. Throughout the 1940s the only action it saw was against CCP guerrilla fighters and other insurgents, although the Japanese chose to rely only on the more elite units while the majority were used for garrison and security duty. Although Japan took the effort of equipping the Manchukuoan forces with some artillery (in addition to the wide variety it had inherited from Zhang Xueliang's army) along with some elderly tankettes and armored cars, the cavalry was the Imperial Army's most effective and developed branch. This was the force that confronted the 76 battle-hardened Red Army divisions transferred from the European front in August 1945 for the Soviet invasion of Manchuria. The cavalry branch saw the most combat against the Red Army, but they and their depleted Japanese Kwantung Army allies were quickly swept aside by the Soviet offensive. While some units remained loyal to their Japanese allies and put up a resistance, many mutinied against their Japanese advisors while others simply melted away into the countryside. Many of these Manchukuo Army troops would later join the Communists since the Chinese Nationalists executed former collaborators with Japan, becoming an important source of manpower and equipment for the Communists in the region.

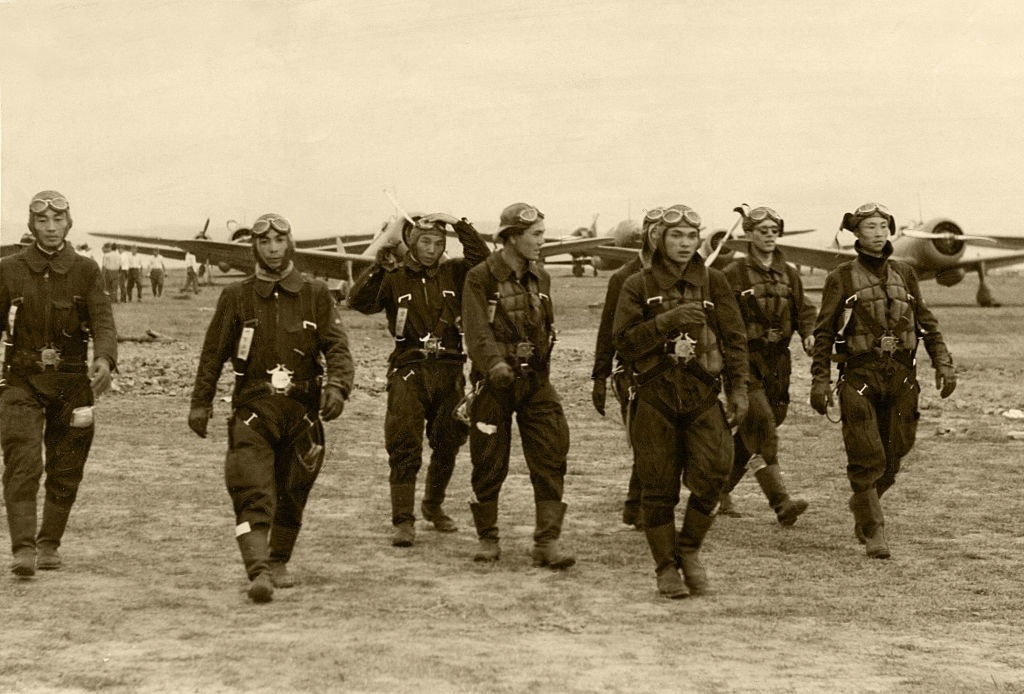
Manchukuo Imperial Air Force pilots in Japan, Nakajima Ki-27 fighter aircraft in background, 1942

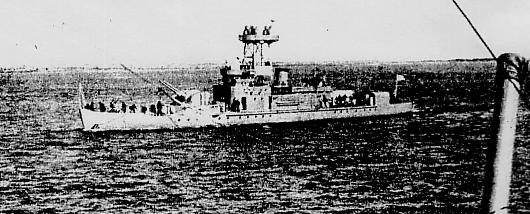
Manchukuo Imperial Navy ship

The other two branches, the Manchukuo Imperial Air Force and the Manchukuo Imperial Navy, were small and underdeveloped, largely existing as token forces to give legitimacy to the Manchukuo regime. An Air Force was established in February 1937 with 30 men selected from the Manchukuo Imperial Army who were trained at the Japanese Kwantung Army aircraft arsenal in Harbin (initially the Kwantung Army did not trust the Manchukuoans enough to train a native air force for them). The Imperial Air Force's predecessor was the Manchukuo Air Transport Company, a paramilitary airline formed in 1931, which undertook transport and reconnaissance missions for the Japanese military. The first air unit was based in Xinjing and equipped with just one Nieuport-Delage NiD 29 and was later expanded with Nakajima Army Type 91 fighters and Kawasaki Type 88 light bombers. Two more air units were established, but they suffered a setback when one hundred pilots took their aircraft and defected to insurgents after murdering their Japanese instructors. Nonetheless, three fighter squadrons were formed in 1942 from the first batch of cadets, being equipped with Nakajima Ki-27 fighters in addition to Tachikawa Ki-9s and Tachikawa Ki-55 trainers, along with some Mitsubishi Ki-57 transports. In 1945, because of American bombing raids, they were issued with Nakajima Ki-43 fighters to have a better chance of intercepting B-29 Superfortresses. Some pilots saw action against the American bombers and at least one Ki-27 pilot downed a B-29 by ramming it with his plane in a kamikaze attack. The air force practically ceased to exist by the Soviet invasion but there were isolated instances of Manchukuoan planes attacking Soviet forces.

The Imperial Navy of Manchukuo existed mainly as a small river flotilla and consisted mainly of small gunboats and patrol boats, both captured Chinese ships and some Japanese additions. The elderly Japanese destroyer Kashi was lent to the Manchukuoan fleet from 1937 to 1942 as the Hai Wei before returning to the Imperial Japanese Navy. These ships were mostly crewed by Japanese sailors.

Several specialized units which functioned outside of the main command structure of the military also existed. The Manchukuo Imperial Guard was formed out of soldiers of ethnic Manchu descent, charged with the protection of the Kangde Emperor and senior officials, as well as to function as an honor guard. Despite this it took part in combat and was considered to be an effective unit. Throughout the 1930s a "Mongolian Independence Army" was established out of about 6,000 ethnic Mongolian recruits and fought its own war against bandits with some success. It was expanded in 1938 but merged with the regular Imperial Army in 1940, although Mongol units continued to perform well. A special Korean detachment was founded in 1937 on the personal initiative of Lee Beom-ik, a collaborationist Korean governor of Gando Province. The unit was small but distinguished itself in combat against CCP guerrillas and was noted by the Japanese for its martial spirit, becoming one of the few puppet units to earn the respect of its Japanese superiors.

== Human rights abuses ==
=== War crimes ===
According to a joint study by historians Zhifen Ju, Mitsuyochi Himeta, Toru Kubo, and Mark Peattie, more than ten million Chinese civilians were used by the Kwantung Army for slave labor in Manchukuo under the supervision of the Kōa-in.

The Chinese slave laborers often suffered illness due to high-intensity manual labor. Some badly ill workers were directly pushed into mass graves in order to avoid the medical expenditure and the world's most serious mine disaster, at Benxihu Colliery, happened in Manchukuo.

Bacteriological weapons were experimented on humans by the infamous Unit 731 located near Harbin in Beiyinhe from 1932 to 1936 and to Pingfan until 1945. Victims, mostly Chinese, Russians and Koreans, were subjected to vivisection, sometimes without anesthesia.

=== Persecution of Oroqen and Nanai peoples ===
The Oroqen suffered a significant population decline under Japanese rule. The Japanese distributed opium among them and subjected some members of the community to human experiments, and combined with incidents of epidemic diseases this caused their population to decline until only 1,000 remained. The Japanese banned Oroqen from communicating with other ethnicities, and forced them to hunt animals for them in exchange for rations and clothing which were sometimes insufficient for survival, which led to deaths from starvation and exposure. Opium was distributed to Oroqen adults older than 18 as a means of control. After 2 Japanese troops were killed in Alihe by an Oroqen hunter, the Japanese poisoned 40 Oroqen to death. The Japanese forced Oroqen to fight for them in the war which led to a population decrease of Oroqen people. Even those Oroqen who avoided direct control by the Japanese found themselves facing conflict from anti-Japanese forces of the Chinese Communists, which contributed to their population decline during this period.

Between 1931 and 1945, the Hezhen population declined by 80% or 90%, due to heavy opium use and deaths from Japanese cruelty, such as slave labor and relocation by the Japanese.

=== Drug trafficking ===
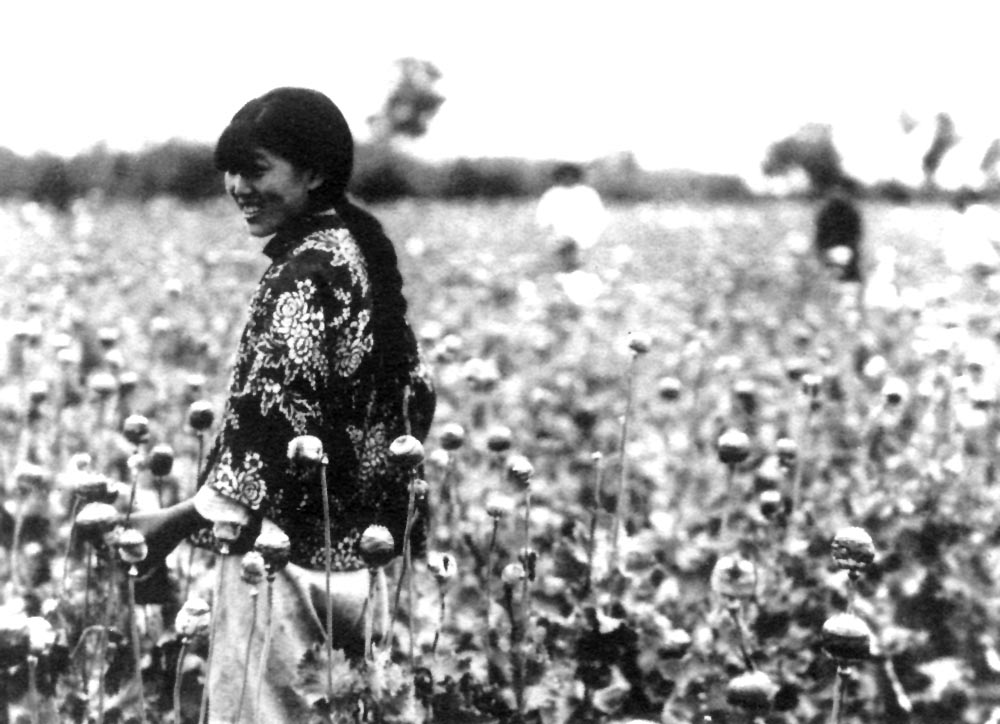
Poppy harvest in Manchukuo

In 2007, an article by Reiji Yoshida in The Japan Times argued that Japanese investments in Manchukuo were partly financed by selling drugs. According to the article, a document found by Yoshida shows that the Kōa-in was directly implicated in providing funds to drug dealers in China for the benefit of the puppet governments of Manchukuo, Nanjing and Mongolia. This document corroborates evidence analyzed earlier by the Tokyo tribunal which stated that:

Japan's real purpose in engaging in drug traffic was far more sinister than even the debauchery of Chinese people. Japan, having signed and ratified the opium conventions, was bound not to engage in drug traffic, but she found in the alleged but false independence of Manchukuo a convenient opportunity to carry on a worldwide drug traffic and cast the guilt upon that puppet state ... In 1937, it was pointed out in the League of Nations that 90% of all illicit white drugs in the world were of Japanese origin ...

== International relations and recognition ==
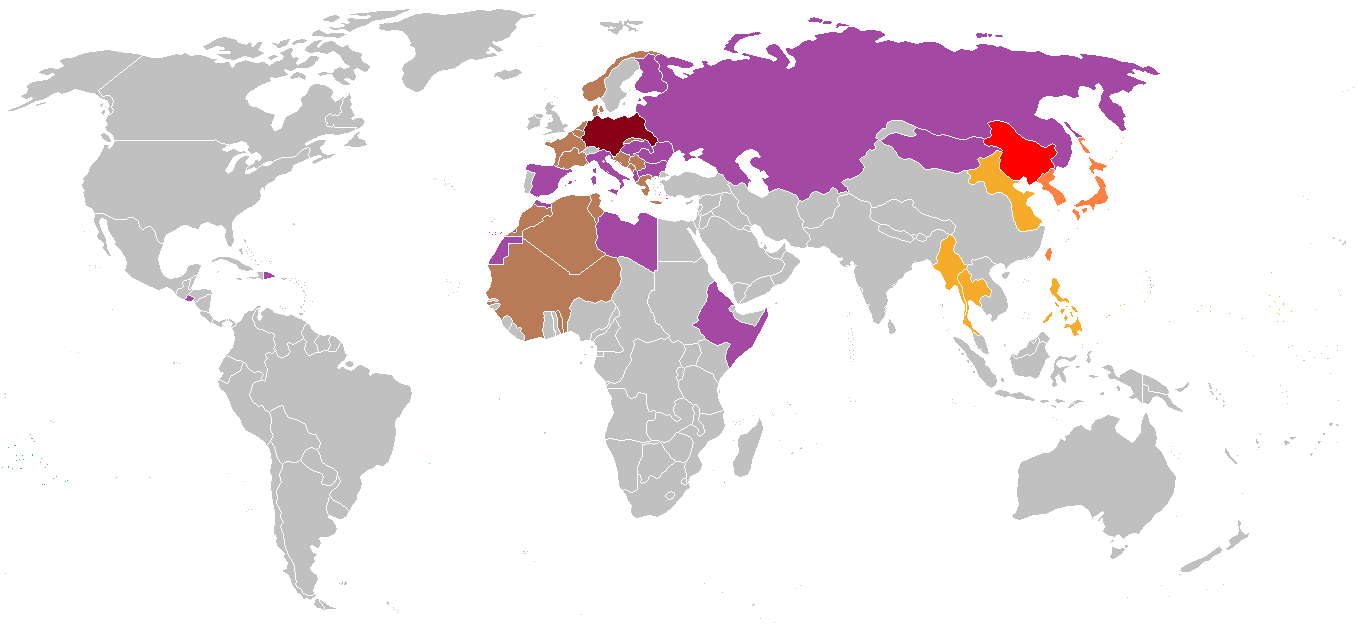
Foreign recognition of Manchukuo represented by states in colors other than gray Manchukuo Japan Japanese-influenced satellite governments Nazi Germany German-occupied areas, or areas under German-influenced satellite governments Other countries recognizing Manchukuo

Following the seizure of Manchuria by Japanese troops in September 1931, the League of Nations dispatched the Lytton Commission to investigate the situation in December of that year. The pretext for the Japanese invasion was an alleged bombing by Chinese soldiers of a railway controlled by Japan at Liutiaogou in Manchuria, despite widespread knowledge that the Japanese army had orchestrated it. This event, referred to as the 'Manchurian Incident,' resulted in the establishment of the state of Manchukuo under Japanese control. While there was much doubt over the truth of the Incident, including from the members of the Lytton Commission, it was not until after the Tokyo War Crimes Trials that documents revealed that the Manchurian Incident was fabricated by Japanese military officers. Manchukuo was merely a puppet state of Japan; and Japan's actions constituted unjustified aggression. When the League of Nations officially endorsed the Lytton Report in February 1933, Japan responded by withdrawing from the international organization. The Manchukuo case persuaded the United States to articulate the Stimson Doctrine, under which international recognition was withheld from changes in the international system created by the force of arms.

In spite of the League's approach, the new state was diplomatically recognized by El Salvador (3 March 1934) and the Dominican Republic (1934), Costa Rica (23 September 1934), Italy (29 November 1937), Spain (2 December 1937), Germany (12 May 1938) and Hungary (9 January 1939). The Soviet Union extended de facto recognition on 23 March 1935, but explicitly noted that this did not mean de jure recognition. However, upon signing the Soviet–Japanese Neutrality Pact on 13 April 1941, the Soviet Union recognized Manchukuo de jure in exchange for Japan recognizing the integrity of neighboring Mongolia. The USSR did maintain five consulates-general in Manchukuo initially, although in 1936–37 these were reduced to just two: one in Harbin and another in Manzhouli. Manchukuo opened consulates in Blagoveshchensk (September 1932) and in Chita (February 1933).

It is commonly believed that the Holy See established diplomatic relations with Manchukuo in 1934, but the Holy See never did so. This belief is partly due to the erroneous reference in Bernardo Bertolucci's 1987 film The Last Emperor that the Holy See diplomatically recognized Manchukuo. Bishop Auguste Ernest Pierre Gaspais was appointed as "representative ad tempus of the Holy See and of the Catholic missions of Manchukuo to the government of Manchukuo" by the Congregation De Propaganda Fide (a purely religious body responsible for missions) and not by the Secretariat of State responsible for diplomatic relations with states. In the 1940s the Vatican established full diplomatic relations with Japan, but it resisted Japanese and Italian pressure to recognize Manchukuo and the Nanking regime.

After the outbreak of World War II, the state was recognized by Slovakia (1 June 1940), Vichy France (12 July 1940), Romania (1 December 1940), Bulgaria (10 May 1941), Finland (17 July 1941), Denmark (August 1941), Croatia (2 August 1941)—all controlled or influenced by Japan's ally Germany—as well as by Wang Jingwei's Reorganized National Government of the Republic of China (30 November 1940), Thailand (5 August 1941) and the Philippines (1943)—all under the control or influence of Japan.

== Society and culture ==
=== National symbols ===
Aside from the national flag, the orchid, reportedly Puyi's favorite flower, became the royal flower of the country, similar to the chrysanthemum in Japan. The sorghum flower also became a national flower by decree in April 1933. "Five Races Under One Union" was used as a national motto.

=== Education ===
Manchukuo developed an efficient public education system. The government established many schools and technical colleges, 12,000 primary schools in Manchukuo, 200 middle schools, 140 normal schools (for preparing teachers), and 50 technical and professional schools. In total the system had 600,000 children and young pupils and 25,000 teachers. Local Chinese children and Japanese children usually attended different schools, and the ones who did attend the same school were segregated by ethnicity, with the Japanese students assigned to better-equipped classes.

The overall education policy in Manchukuo was promote its view of "nation-building for the Kingly Way, ethnic harmony, and the integration of Japanese and Manchus." In rural areas, students were trained to practice modern agricultural techniques to improve production. Education focused on practical work training for boys and domestic work for girls, all based on obedience to the "Kingly Way" and stressing loyalty to the Emperor. The regime used numerous festivals, sports events, and ceremonies to foster loyalty of citizens. Eventually, Japanese became the official language in addition to the Chinese taught in Manchukuo schools.

Schools raised the Japanese flag as a daily ritual and had students bow in the direction of the Japanese emperor's palace and in the direction of the emperor of Manchukuo. History and geography curricula were confined to Manchukuo only. Censorship practices forbid the use of words like Zhongguo (China) or Zhonghua (Chinese) in schools.

=== Film ===
The Photographic Division, part of the public relations section of the South Manchurian Railway was created in 1928 to produce short documentary films about Manchuria to Japanese audiences. In 1937, the Manchukuo Film Association was established by the government and the South Manchurian Railway in a studio in Jilin province. It was founded by Masahiko Amakasu, who also helped the career of Yoshiko Ōtaka, also known as Ri Koran. He also tried to ensure that Manchukuo would have its own industry and would be catering mainly to Manchurian audiences. The films for the most part usually promote pro-Manchukuo and pro-Japanese views. General Amakasu shot various "documentaries" showing carefully choreographed scenes worthy of Hollywood of Emperor Puyi in his capital of Xinjing (modern Changchun) being cheered by thousands of subjects and reviewing his troops marching in parades that were intended to help legitimize Manchukuo's independence. After World War II, the archives and the equipment of the association were used by the Changchun Film Studio of the People's Republic of China.

=== Dress ===
The Changshan and the Qipao, both derived from traditional Manchu dress, were considered national dresses in Manchukuo.

In a meeting with the Concordia Association, the organizers devised what was termed Concordia Costume, or the kyōwafuku, in 1936. Even Japanese such as Masahiko Amakasu and Kanji Ishiwara adopted it. It was gray and a civilianized version of the Imperial Japanese Army uniform. It was similar to the National Clothes (kokumin-fuku) worn by Japanese civilians in World War II as well as the Zhongshan suit. A pin of either a Manchukuo flag or a five-pointed, five-colored star with the Manchukuo national colors were worn on the collars.

=== Sport ===
Manchukuo had a national football team, and football was considered the country's de facto national sport; the Football Association of Manchukuo was formed around it.

Manchukuo hosted and participated in baseball matches with Japanese teams. Some of the games of the Intercity baseball tournament were held in the country, and played with local teams. In 1926, Tairen Commercial High School became the first team from Manchuria to make it to the finals when they participated in the tournament, losing 2–1 to Shizuoka Central in the final.

Manchukuo was to compete in the 1932 Summer Olympics, but one of the athletes who intended to represent Manchukuo, Liu Changchun, refused to join the team and instead joined as the first Chinese representative in the Olympics. There were attempts by Japanese authorities to let Manchukuo join the 1936 games, but the Olympic Committee persisted in the policy of not allowing an unrecognized state to join the Olympics. Manchukuo had a chance to participate in the planned 1940 Helsinki Olympics, but the onset of World War II prevented the games from taking place. Manchukuo instead sent athletes to compete at the 1940 East Asian Games in Tokyo organised by the Japanese Empire, as a replacement for the cancelled 1940 Summer Olympics.

=== Stamps and postal history ===
Manchukuo issued postage stamps from 28 July 1932 until its dissolution following the surrender of the Empire of Japan in August 1945. The last issue of Manchukuo was on 2 May 1945.

=== Women's roles ===
Manchukuo promoted the conservative view of women's roles as "good wives and wise mothers". Education for girls and women in Manchukuo was based around reinforcing this idea.

== Notable people ==
=== Local administration ===
- Puyi: Emperor of Manchukuo (1934–1945); formerly the last Emperor of China and the Qing dynasty
- Pujie: Head of the Manchukuo Imperial Guards (1933–1945), younger brother of Puyi, former Qing prince and heir presumptive
- Empress Wanrong: Empress of Manchukuo (1934–1945) and Empress Consort of Puyi
- Jin Yunying: Younger sister of Puyi and former Qing princess
- Yoshiko Kawashima: Spy for the Kwantung Army and Manchukuo, Puyi's cousin and former Qing royalty
- Zheng Xiaoxu: First Prime Minister of Manchukuo (1932–1935) and close advisor and tutor to Puyi
- Luo Zhenyu: Chairman of the Japan-Manchukuo Cultural Cooperation Society, tutor and advisor to Puyi, and Qing loyalist
- Zhang Jinghui: Second and last Prime Minister of Manchukuo (1935–1945), Foreign Minister (1937), and Minister of Defense (1932–1935)
- Ma Zhanshan: Minister of Defense (1932) and governor of Heilongjiang province (1931–1933); former Chinese general who was one of the main leaders against the Japanese during the invasion of Manchuria
- Xi Qia: Imperial Household Minister and Interior Minister (1935–1945) and later Minister of Finance (1932–1935)
- Zang Shiyi: Governor of Liaoning province, Speaker of the Senate (1935–1945), Vice Minister for Home Affairs, and ambassador to the Reorganized National Government of China
- Xie Jieshi: Foreign Minister (1932–1935), ambassador to Japan, and Minister of Industry
- Yu Zhishan: Minister of Defense (1935–1939), commander-in-chief of the 1st Army, and Army Minister
- Sun Qichang: Director of the Spirits and Tobacco State Monopoly, governor of Heilongjiang province, governor of Longjiang province, Minister of Finance, and Minister of Civil Affairs
- Liu Menggeng: Governor of Rehe province (1934–1937)
- Bao Guancheng: Mayor of Harbin and ambassador to Japan
- Zhang Yanqing: Foreign Minister (1935–1937), Industry Minister, and co-director of the Concordia Association
- Li Shaogeng: Foreign Minister (1942–1944), Minister of Transportation, and Special Envoy to the Reorganized National Government of China
- Ruan Zhenduo: Chief Secretary for Liaoning province, co-founder of the Concordia Association, Foreign Minister (1944–1945), Minister of Education (1935–1937), Minister of Transportation (1940–1942), and Minister of Finance (1942–1944)
- Ding Jianxiu: Minister of Transportation (1934–1935) and Minister of Enterprises (1935–1937)
- Lü Ronghuan: Mayor of Harbin, Governor of Harbin Special Municipality (1933–1935), Governor of Binjiang Province (1934–1935), Minister of Civil Affairs (1935–1937) (1940–1941), Minister of Enterprises (1937), Minister of Industries (1937–1940), and special envoy to the Reorganized National Government of China (1941–1944)
- Yuan Jinkai: Lord Keeper of the Privy Seal
- Li Yuan: Co-founder of the East Hebei Autonomous Council
- Tong Jixu: Chief of Security to the Imperial Household Department
- Zhang Haipeng: Governor of Rehe province (1933–1934), Commander of the Taoliao Army, Commander of the Rehe Guard Army
- Li Jizhun: General and commander of the National Salvation Army (A Japanese puppet force)
- Liu Guitang: Manchukuo soldier and commander, involved in the actions in Inner Mongolia (1933–1936)
- Cui Xingwu: Officer in the 55th army of Rehe under Tang Yulin and commanded the 9th Cavalry brigade during the Battle of Rehe before subsequently defecting to the Japanese; later involved in the actions in Inner Mongolia
- Yangsanjab: Head of the Khorchin Left Wing Middle Banner and a Mongol prince from Southeastern Mongolia

=== Culture ===
- Jue Qing: Writer; later labeled as a "traitor to the Chinese nation"

=== White Russian leaders ===
- Vladimir Kislitsin: Former Imperial Russian Army officer and later a commander of the White movement
- Grigory Mikhaylovich Semyonov: Former Imperial Russian Army soldier and general of the White movement; employed by Puyi, the Emperor of Manchukuo
- Urzhin Garmaev: White movement general who served in the Manchukuo Imperial Army as a lieutenant general
- Konstantin Petrovich Nechaev: Former Imperial Russian Army officer and general of the White movement; lived in Manchukuo after its founding
- Konstantin Rodzaevsky: Leader of the Russian Fascist Party based in Manzhouli, Manchukuo

=== Notable Koreans ===
- Park Chung Hee: Enlisted and served in the Manchukuo Imperial Army during World War II as a lieutenant; later served in the Korean War and became a general in the Republic of Korea Army and the 3rd President of South Korea; assassinated in 1979
- Chung Il-kwon: Served in the Manchukuo Imperial Army as a captain during World War II; later served in the Korean War and became a South Korean Army General and subsequently served as Foreign Minister and the 8th Prime Minister of South Korea
- Paik Sun-yup: Enlisted in the Manchukuo Imperial Army during World War II as a first lieutenant and served with the Gando Special Force; later joined the South Korean Army and served in the Korean War as a general; died on July 10, 2020
- Kim Chang-ryong: Joined the Imperial Japanese Army in Manchukuo and served in the Military police as a detective to hunt down moles in the Kenpeitai and Communists; later joined the South Korean Army as a high-ranking officer and became the head of the National Intelligence Service; assassinated in 1956 by army colleagues

== In popular culture ==
in Hergé's 1934 Tintin: The Blue Lotus, Tintin and Snowy are invited to China in the midst of the 1931 Japanese invasion of Manchuria, where he reveals the machinations of Japanese spies and uncovers a drug-smuggling ring.

The 1944 Australia radio serial Forgotten Men was set in the country.

In Masaki Kobayashi's The Human Condition (1959), Kaji, the main protagonist, is a labor supervisor assigned to a workforce consisting of Chinese prisoners in a large mining operation in Japanese-colonized Manchuria.

Bernardo Bertolucci's 1987 film The Last Emperor presented a portrait of Manchukuo through the memories of Emperor Puyi, during his days as a political prisoner in the People's Republic of China.

Haruki Murakami's 1995 novel The Wind-Up Bird Chronicle deals greatly with Manchukuo through the character of Lieutenant Mamiya. Mamiya recalls, in person and in correspondence, his time as an officer in the Kwantung Army in Manchukuo. While the period covered in these recollections extends over many years, the focus is on the final year of the war and the Soviet invasion of Manchuria.

In Michael Chabon's 2007 alternative history novel The Yiddish Policemen's Union, in this alternative present the novel refers to an independent Manchuria, that is led by a prime minister and has its own Space programme.

The 2008 South Korean western The Good, the Bad, the Weird is set in the desert wilderness of 1930s Manchuria.

== See also ==
- Battle of Lake Khasan
- Collaborationist Chinese Army
- Fengtian clique
- Japanization
- List of East Asian leaders in the Japanese sphere of influence (1931–1945)
- Manchurian nationalism
- Marco Polo Bridge incident
- Mengjiang
- Nomonhan Incident
- Northeast Anti-Japanese United Army
