= Japan–Manchukuo Protocol =

1932 treaty between Japan and Manchukuo

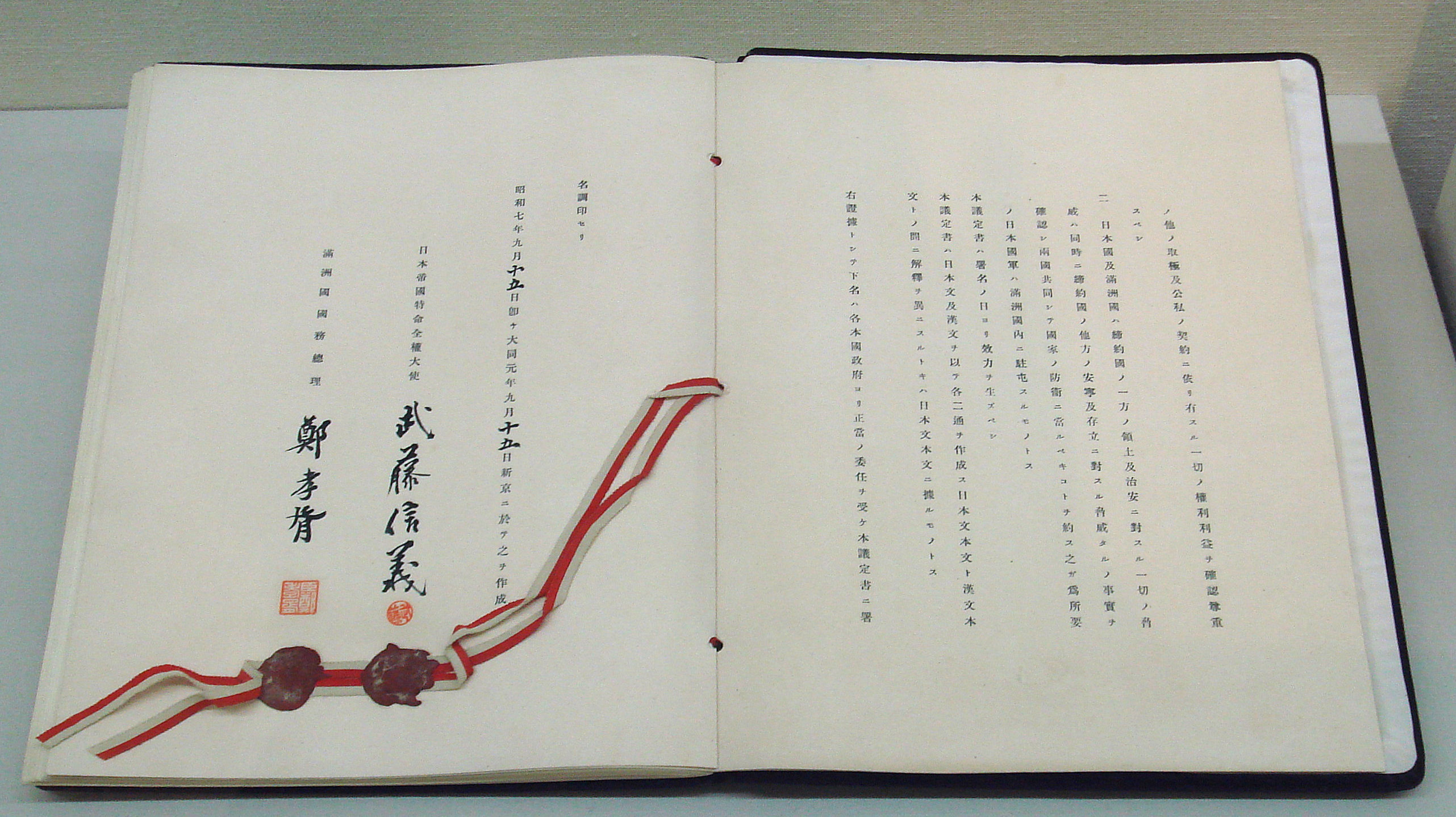
Japan-Manchukuo Protocol, 15 September 1932.

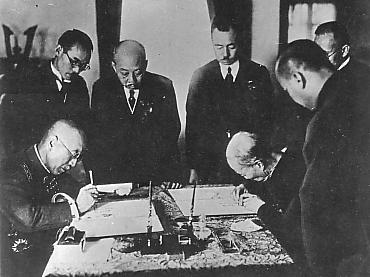
Nobuyoshi Mutō and Zheng Xiaoxu signing the treaty.

The Japan–Manchukuo Protocol (Chinese: 日滿議定書; Japanese: 日満議定書) was signed on 15 September 1932, between Japan and the state of Manchukuo. The Treaty confirmed the recognition by Japan of the Manchukuo state, following the Japanese invasion of Manchuria in 1931, and the establishment of a Manchurian state on 1 March 1932. The treaty also defined a mutual defence agreement, allowing Japanese troops to station in Manchukuo, and thereby effectively occupy the country.

On the Japanese side, the protocol was signed by Ambassador Nobuyoshi Mutō, and on the Manchu side by Prime Minister Zheng Xiaoxu.

== Text ==
Original Japanese:

日本國ハ滿洲國ガ其ノ住民ノ意思ニ基キテ自由ニ成立シ獨立ノ一國家ヲ成スニ至リタル事實ヲ確認シタルニ因リ

滿洲國ハ中華民國ノ有スル國際約定ハ滿洲國ニ適用シ得ベキ限リ之ヲ尊重スベキコトヲ宣言セルニ因リ

日本國政府及滿洲國政府ハ日滿兩國間ノ善隣ノ關係ヲ永遠ニ鞏固ニシ互ニ其ノ領土權ヲ尊重シ東洋ノ平和ヲ確保センガ爲左ノ如ク協定セリ

一 滿洲國ハ將來日滿兩國間ニ別段ノ約定ヲ締結セザル限リ滿洲國領域内ニ於テ日本國又ハ日本國臣民ガ從來ノ日支間ノ條約協定其ノ他ノ取極及公私ノ契約ニ依リ有スル一切ノ權利利益ヲ確認尊重スベシ

二 日本國及滿洲國ハ締約國ノ一方ノ領土及治安ニ對スル一切ノ脅威ハ同時ニ締約國ノ他方ノ安寧及存立ニ對スル脅威タルノ事實ヲ確認シ兩國共同シテ國家ノ防衞ニ當ルベキコトヲ約ス之ガ爲所要ノ日本國軍ハ滿洲國内ニ駐屯スルモノトス

本議定書ハ署名ノ日ヨリ效力ヲ生ズベシ

本議定書ハ日本文及漢文ヲ以テ各二通ヲ作成ス日本文本文ト漢文本文トノ間ニ解釋ヲ異ニスルトキハ日本文本文ニ據ルモノトス

右證據トシテ下名ハ各本國政府ヨリ正當ノ委任ヲ受ケ本議定書ニ署名調印セリ

昭和七年九月十五日卽チ大同元年九月十五日新京ニ於テ之ヲ作成ス

日本帝國特命全權大使 武藤信義

滿洲國國務總理 鄭孝胥

English translation:

Japan recognizes the establishment of a free and independent Manchoukuo in accordance with the free will of its inhabitants. Manchukuo has declared its intention of abiding by all international agreements pledged by the Republic of China. The government of Japan and the government of Manchukuo have established a perpetual friendly and neighborly relationship, mutually guaranteeing each other's sovereignty. For the peace of East Asia:

1. Manchukuo, insofar as no future Japan-Manchukuo treaties to the contrary, respects the rights of Japanese government, government officials, and private citizens within the borders of Manchukuo.
2. Japan and Manchukuo pledge to cooperate in the maintenance of mutual peaceful existence by banding against common outside threats. The Japanese military forces are to be stationed in Manchukuo to this end.

This protocol is to be effective immediately upon signing.

This protocol is written in Japanese and Chinese; should there be any differences between the two documents due to translation issues, the document written in the Japanese language shall be considered the original.

Evidenced by fully authorized representatives of each government with signature and seal.

Signed on 15 September of the 7th Year of Showa, also 15 September of the 1st Year of Datong, at Xinjing.

Special Authorized Ambassador of the Japanese Empire: Nobuyoshi Mutō

Prime Minister of Manchukuo: Zheng Xiaoxu
