= Manchukuo yuan =

Currency of Manchukuo

満洲国圓 (Japanese); 滿洲國圓 (Chinese)
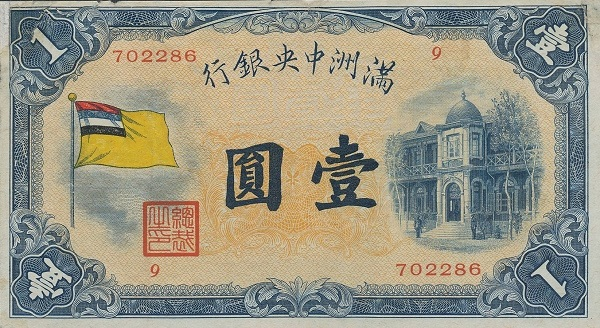
- Central Bank of Manchou 1 yuan (1932)

Denominations
- Subunit
- 1/1000: li
- 1/100: fen
- 1/10: jiao
- Banknotes: 1, 5, 10, 100, 1000 yuan
- Coins: 5 li, 1, 5 fen, 1 jiao

Demographics
- User(s): Manchukuo

Issuance
- Central bank: Central Bank of Manchou
- This infobox shows the latest status before this currency was rendered obsolete.

The Manchukuo yuan (Note: Hanyu Pinyin: Mǎnzhōuguóyuán; Wade–Giles: Man³-chou¹-kuo²-yüan²; Japanese: 満洲国圓; rōmaji: Manshūkokuen) was the official unit of currency of Manchukuo, from June 1932 to August 1945.

The monetary unit was based on one basic pure silver patron of 23.91 grams. It replaced the Chinese Haikwan tael, the local monetary system in common and regular use in Manchuria before the Mukden Incident, as legal tender.

== History ==
Initially banknotes and coins were produced and minted by the Bank of Japan, but were later issued from the mint of the Central Bank of Manchou in the Manchukuo capital of Hsinking (now Changchun) with branch offices in Harbin, Mukden, Jilin, and Qiqihar. The Central Bank of Manchou was opened on 1 July 1932 with a ceremony attended by the Emperor of Manchukuo in person, the new central bank acquired the assets and continued the responsibilities of the previous four banknote issuing banks in the region of Manchuria.

The currency that circulated in Manchuria prior to the introduction of the Manchukuo yuan consisted of the banknotes of various provincial banks as well as commercial banks, silver smelting shops (known as yinchang), and pawn shops. Types of old banknotes recovered and later destroyed included high denomination banknotes, banknotes denominated in copper coins, official provincial notes issued by the banks of the provincial government, small denomination coin notes, tiao/diào denominated notes, jiao denominated notes and others. The 15 different types of currency that circulated in Manchuria prior to the introduction of the Manchukuo yuan were allowed to be exchanged for the new currency by degree for a period of three years, using this method ninety-five point four percent of all previous Manchurian currency that was still in circulation, and the destruction of these old banknotes was handled by officials from the Department of Finance of the government of Manchukuo. The old banknotes were first shredded by machines and then burned, but the number of banknotes that had to be destroyed proved so numerous and new hearths would have to be constructed to burn all the old paper money.

Due to worldwide fluctuations in the price of silver during the 1930s, Manchukuo took the yuan off the silver standard in 1935 and subsequently pegged the yuan to, and later reached approximate exchange parity with, the Japanese yen. In 1940 the Manchukuo yuan was being used to measure Manchukuo exports and imports to countries that included America, Germany and Japan.

Throughout this period about half the value of the issued notes was backed by specie reserves. The notes issued were in five denominations, one hundred, ten, five and one yuan and five jiao (one-half yuan), and typically depicted Qing dynasty rulers of China on the obverse. To keep up with the inflationary pressures typically experienced by Japanese-controlled areas towards the end of World War II, a 1,000 yuan note was issued in 1944.

The Yuan was subdivided into 10 jiao (角), 100 fen (分) or 1000 li (釐). Coins were issued in denominations of 5 li up to 10 fen.

In 1944 and 1945, Manchukuo issued coins (1 and 5 fen) made of what the Standard Catalog of World Coins describes as "red or brown fiber", resembling cardboard. These are a rare example of non-metallic coins.

As a matter of policy, the United States prevented any trading in the currency. This made it more difficult for the nation to access the American credit market.

In 1948, after the end of World War II, approximately 12 billion yuan of Central Bank of Manchukou notes were redeemed by the Tung Pei Bank.

== Banknotes ==
Initially banknotes were printed by the Japanese but also by the Manchu Imperial Printing Bureau after the old Chinese mint in the city of Mukden was repaired.

Banknotes of the Manchukuo yuan (1932-1933 issue)
Image		Value	Main Color	Description		Date of issue
Obverse	Reverse	Value	Main Color	Obverse	Reverse	Date of issue
		50 fen (5 jiao)	Dark blue and ochre	Denomination in Chinese		
		1 yuan	Blue and yellow	Flag of Manchukuo; Qinmin Building at the Manchukuo Imperial Palace	Denomination	1932-1933
		5 yuan	Dark brown and tan	Flag of Manchukuo; Qinmin Building at the Manchukuo Imperial Palace	Denomination	1933
		10 yuan	Blue and orange	Flag of Manchukuo; Qinmin Building at the Manchukuo Imperial Palace	Denomination	1932
		100 yuan	Blue and yellow-orange	Flag of Manchukuo; Qinmin Building at the Manchukuo Imperial Palace	Denomination	1933

Banknotes of the Manchukuo yuan (1935-1938 issue)
Image		Value	Main Color	Description		Date of issue
Obverse	Reverse	Value	Main Color	Obverse	Reverse	Date of issue
		5 jiao (50 fen)	Brown, green and lilac	Marshal Chao Kung Ming ("God of Wealth")	Pavilion	1935
		1 yuan	Black, green and yellow	T'ien Ming	Imperial Palace, Hsinking	1937
		5 yuan	Black and brown	Mencius	Building complex of the General Affairs State Council, Hsinking	1938
		10 yuan	Black and brown	Marshal Chao Kung Ming ("God of Wealth")	Headquarters of the Central Bank of Manchou, Hsinking	1937
		100 yuan	Black and green	Ta Ch'eng Hall of the Harbin Confucius Temple, Confucius	Sheep	1938

Banknotes of the Manchukuo yuan (1944 issue)
Image		Value	Main Color	Description		Date of issue
Obverse	Reverse	Value	Main Color	Obverse	Reverse	Date of issue
		5 jiao (50 fen)	Blue-green and pale blue	Ta Ch'eng Hall of the Harbin Confucius Temple	Chinese dragon	1944
		1 yuan	Black, green and violet	T'ien Ming	Denomination in Chinese and Mongolian	1944
		5 yuan	Black and orange	Mencius	Building complex of the General Affairs State Council, Hsinking	1944
		10 yuan	Black and green	Marshal Chao Kung Ming ("God of Wealth")	Headquarters of the Central Bank of Manchou, Hsinking	1944
		100 yuan	Black and blue	Ta Ch'eng Hall of the Harbin Confucius Temple, Confucius	Silos	1944

Banknotes of the Manchukuo yuan (1941-1945 issue)
Image		Value	Main Color	Description		Date of issue
Obverse	Reverse	Value	Main Color	Obverse	Reverse	Date of issue
		5 fen	Blue-green	Imperial Seal of Manchukuo; denomination	Tower	1945
		1 jiao	Yellow-orange	Imperial Seal of Manchukuo	House	1944
		5 jiao (50 fen)	Green, pink and orange	Marshal Zhao Gong Ming ("God of Wealth")	Pavilion	1941
		100 yuan	Black and blue	Ta Ch'eng Hall of the Harbin Confucius Temple, Confucius	Silos	1945
		1,000 yuan	Dark brown and violet	Ta Ch'eng Hall of the Harbin Confucius Temple, Confucius	Headquarters of the Central Bank of Manchou, Hsinking	1944

== Coins ==
Coins of the Manchukuo yuan
Image	Value	Technical parameters				Description			Date of first minting
Image	Value	Diameter	Thickness	Mass	Composition	Edge	Obverse	Reverse	Date of first minting
	5 li	21 mm		3.5 grams	Bronze	Plain/Smooth	Flag of Manchukuo within an inner pearl circle; text "⋆國洲滿大⋆ 年三同大"	Denomination in floral wreath	1933-1934 (Datong 2–3)
	5 li	21 mm		3.5 grams	Bronze	Plain/Smooth	Flag of Manchukuo within an inner pearl circle; text "⋆國洲滿大⋆ 年元德康"	Denomination in floral wreath	1934-1939 (Kangde 1–6)
	1 fen	24 mm		4.9 grams	Bronze	Plain/Smooth	Flag of Manchukuo within an inner pearl circle; text "⋆國洲滿大⋆ 年二同大"	Denomination in floral wreath	1933-1934 (Datong 2–3)
	1 fen	24 mm		4.9 grams	Bronze	Plain/Smooth	Flag of Manchukuo within an inner pearl circle; text "⋆國洲滿大⋆ 年二德康"	Denomination in floral wreath	1934-1939 (Kangde 1–6)
	1 fen	19 mm	1.6 mm	1 gram	Aluminum	Plain/Smooth	Imperial Seal of Manchukuo; text "• 國洲滿大 • 年八德康"	Denomination in a wreath of rice	1939-1943 (Kangde 6–10)
	1 fen	16 mm		0.55 grams	Aluminum	Reeded	Numerical "1"; text "• 國帝洲滿 • 年一十德康"	Floral cartouche dividing the denomination; clouds above and below	1943-1944 (Kangde 10–11)
	1 fen			0.62 grams	Red or brown fiber material	Plain/Smooth	Numerical "1"; text "• 國帝洲滿 • 年二十德康"	Floral cartouche dividing the denomination; clouds above and below	1945 (Kangde 12)
	5 fen	20 mm	1.5 mm	3.5 grams	Copper-nickel	Plain/Smooth	Lotus flower; text "⋆ 國洲滿大 ⋆ 年三同大"	Pearl above denomination between two dragons	1933-1934 (Datong 2–3)
	5 fen	20 mm		3.7 grams	Copper-nickel	Plain/Smooth	Lotus flower; text "⋆ 國洲滿大 ⋆ 年元德康"	Pearl above denomination between two dragons	1934-1939 (Kangde 1–6)
	5 fen	21 mm	1.6 mm	1.2 grams	Aluminum	Plain/Smooth	Big numerical "5" inside a circle; text "• 國洲滿大 • 年十儀溥"	Imperial Seal of Manchukuo above denomination; floral wreath below	1940-1943 (Kangde 7–10)
	5 fen	19 mm		0.75 grams	Aluminum	Reeded	Numerical "5"; text "• 國帝洲滿 • 年一十德康"	Floral cartouche dividing the denomination; clouds above and below	1943-1944 (Kangde 10–11)
	5 fen	20 mm	2.3 mm	1.2 grams	Red or brown fiber material	Plain/Smooth	Numerical "5"; text "• 國帝洲滿 • 年一十德康"	Floral cartouche dividing the denomination; clouds above and below	1944-1945 (Kangde 11–12)
	1 jiao	23 mm		5 grams	Copper-nickel	Plain/Smooth	Lotus flower; text "⋆ 國洲滿大 ⋆ 年三同大"	Pearl above denomination between two dragons	1933-1934 (Datong 2–3)
	1 jiao	23 mm		5 grams	Copper-nickel	Plain/Smooth	Lotus flower; text "⋆ 國洲滿大 ⋆ 年五德康"	Pearl above denomination between two dragons	1934-1939 (Kangde 1–6)
	1 jiao	21 mm		3.5 grams	Copper-nickel	Reeded	Two pegasi; text "• 國洲滿大 • 年七德康"	Imperial Seal of Manchukuo above denomination with stylized sunrise and clouds	1940 (Kangde 7)
	1 jiao (10 fen)	23 mm		1.7 grams	Aluminum	Reeded	Numerical "10" within an outline of a "Fundo" weight; text "• 國洲滿大 • 年九德康"	Imperial Seal of Manchukuo above denomination with two rice stalks	1940-1943 (Kangde 7–10)
	1 jiao (10 fen)	22 mm	1 mm	1 gram	Aluminum	Plain/Smooth	Numerical "10"; text "• 國帝洲滿 • 年十德康"	Floral cartouche dividing the denomination; clouds above and below	1943 (Kangde 10)

== See also ==
- Central Bank of Manchou
- Paper money of the Qing dynasty
- Qing dynasty coinage

Preceded by: Chinese yuan Reason: Wide range of yuan issued by the private and commercial banks based in Northeast China and by various third parties (pawn shops, silver smelting shops (yinchang), etc.) in Manchuria prior to the establishment of Manchukuo.	Currency of Manchuria; 1932 – 1945	Succeeded by: Yuan of the Red Army Command; Reason: Soviet invasion of Manchuria and the Surrender of Japan.
