= Emblem of Korea =

Emblem of Korea may refer to several different national emblems used by Korea:

- Emblem of North Korea
- Emblem of South Korea
- Imperial Seal of Korea
- Taegeuk
