= Seal of Korea =

Seal of Korea may refer to:

- Imperial Seal of Korea
- Seal of South Korea
- Emblem of North Korea
- Republic of Korea Navy Special Warfare Flotilla
