= Salt Palace (disambiguation) =

Salt Palace may refer to:

- Salt Palace convention center in Salt Lake City
  - First Salt Palace, former theater in Salt Lake City
  - Salt Palace (arena), former arena in Salt Lake City
- Museum of the Imperial Palace of Manchukuo, former Manchukuo imperial residence called the Salt Palace
