= Yuan of the Red Army Command =

Soviet military banknote issued 1945–1946

Chinese: 紅軍圓 / 紅軍票; pinyin: Hóngjūnyuán / Hóngjūnpiào
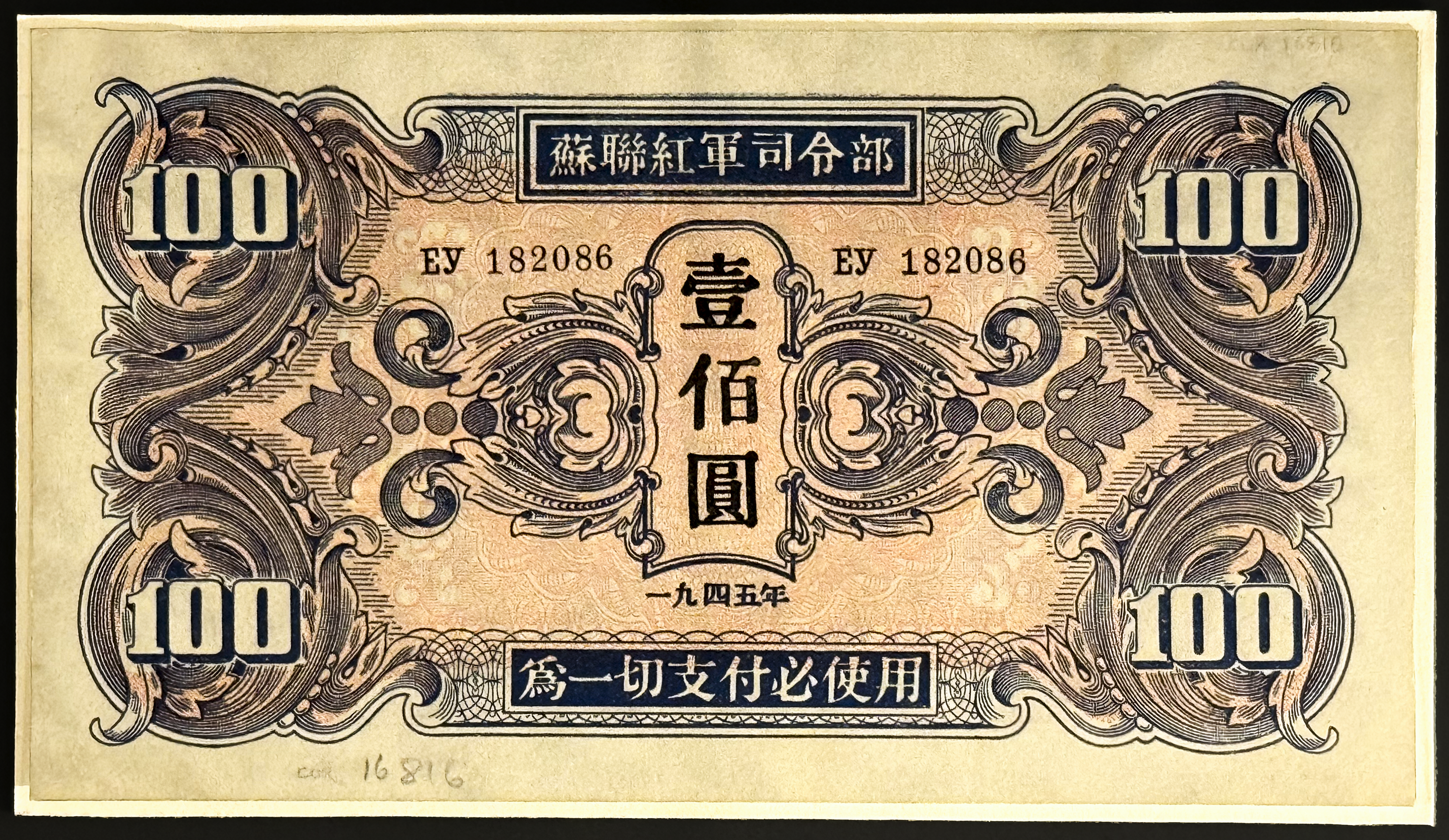
- 100 yuan of 1945 year

Denominations
- Banknotes: 1, 5, 10, 100 yuan
- Coins: Not issued

Demographics
- Date of introduction: 24 August 1945
- Replaced: Manchukuo yuan
- Date of withdrawal: 3 March 1946 - 31 December 1949
- Replaced by: North-eastern yuan
- User(s): (Soviet Union) Chinese Manchuria under Soviet control

Issuance
- Central bank: Command of the Red Army in Manchuria
- This infobox shows the latest status before this currency was rendered obsolete.

Yuan of the Red Army Command (Chinese: 紅軍圓; pinyin: Hóngjūnyuán, also called Chinese: 紅軍票; pinyin: Hóngjūnpiào) are banknotes issued by the Soviet military command in Northeast China in 1945–1946.

== History ==
In February 1945, at the Yalta Conference, the Soviet Union undertook to enter the war with Japan no later than 3 months after the defeat of Germany. On August 8, the USSR declared war on Japan; on August 9, hostilities began in Manchuria. By August 20, 1945, the main hostilities ended, and individual clashes continued until September 10. Soviet troops occupied Manchuria.

Money circulation in China was in a chaotic state, a single emission center did not exist. In Manchuria, the yuan of Manchukuo and the money of other puppet Chinese governments were in circulation. To pay for purchases of food and other goods and services needed to provide Soviet military units, the Soviet military command launched the release of military money. Banknotes of 1, 5, 10 and 100 yuan were issued, printed in the USSR. On banknotes with colored patterns - inscriptions in hieroglyphs.

The issue was made until May 1946 and was stopped with the withdrawal of the Soviet troops, by this time denominations of 1 and 5 yuan due to inflation were practically not used in circulation. Banknotes of 10 and 100 yuan with stickers affixed with signs continued to be used in circulation until the issuance of new banknotes in China.

== List of banknotes ==
Юань Командования Красной армии 紅軍圓 Yuan of the Red Army Command
Picture	Value	Colour	Size
	1	blue	124х67 mm
	5	brown	134х77 mm
	10	red	156х83 mm
	100	violet	168х94 mm

== See also ==
- Manchukuo yuan
- Tuvan akşa

== Bibliography ==
- Сенилов, Б.В. (1991). Военные деньги Второй мировой войны. М.: Финансы и статистика. p. 123.
- Cuhaj, G.S. (2008). Standard Catalog of World Paper Money. General Issues 1368—1960 (12-е изд ed.). Iola: Krause Publications. p. 1223. ISBN 978-0-89689-730-4.
- 中国革命战争纪实。解放战争。东北卷 (Полная история Революционной войны. Освободительная война. Том «Северо-восток»), — Пекин: «Народное издательство», 2004. ISBN 978-7-01-004261-9

Preceded by: Manchukuo yuan Reason: Soviet invasion of Manchuria and the Surrender of Japan.	Currency of Manchuria; 1945 – 1946	Succeeded by: North-eastern yuan Reason: Return of Manchuria to China.
