= Soviet occupation of Manchuria =

1945–1946 military occupation

Soviet occupation of Manchuria Маньчжурия под оккупацией СССР (Russian) 蘇佔滿洲 (Chinese) ソビエト連邦による満洲占領 (Japanese)
- 1945–1946 (Note: Occupation of Lüshun base until 1955)
- Flag of the Soviet Union (1936–1955)
- Anthem: "State Anthem of the Union of Soviet Socialist Republics"
- Soviet gains in Northeast Asia, August 1945
- Status: Soviet occupation
- Capital: Shenyang (Command Station)
- Common languages: Chinese (Northeastern Mandarin); Japanese; Russian
- Soviet commander
  - 1946: Rodion Malinovsky
- History
  - Soviet troops invaded Manchuria: 9 August 1945
  - Withdrawal of all Soviet troops in Manchuria: 3 May 1946 (Note: Occupation of Lüshun base until 1955)
- Currency: Yuan
- Time zone: UTC+8
Preceded by
Manchukuo
Mengjiang
Wang Jingwei regime
Kwantung
Succeeded by
Republic of China
Anti-Japanese Base Areas
Inner Mongolian People's Republic
Soviet occupation of Lüshun
- Today part of: China; Russia

The Soviet occupation of Manchuria took place after the Red Army invaded the Empire of Japan's puppet state of Manchukuo in August 1945; the occupation would continue until Soviet forces withdrew in May 1946.

== History ==
On 11 February 1945, the Big Three (Franklin D. Roosevelt, Winston Churchill, and Joseph Stalin) signed the Yalta Agreement. Yalta obligated the Soviet Union to enter the war against Japan within three months after Germany's surrender, in exchange for territorial concessions and Soviet influence in post-war Manchuria.

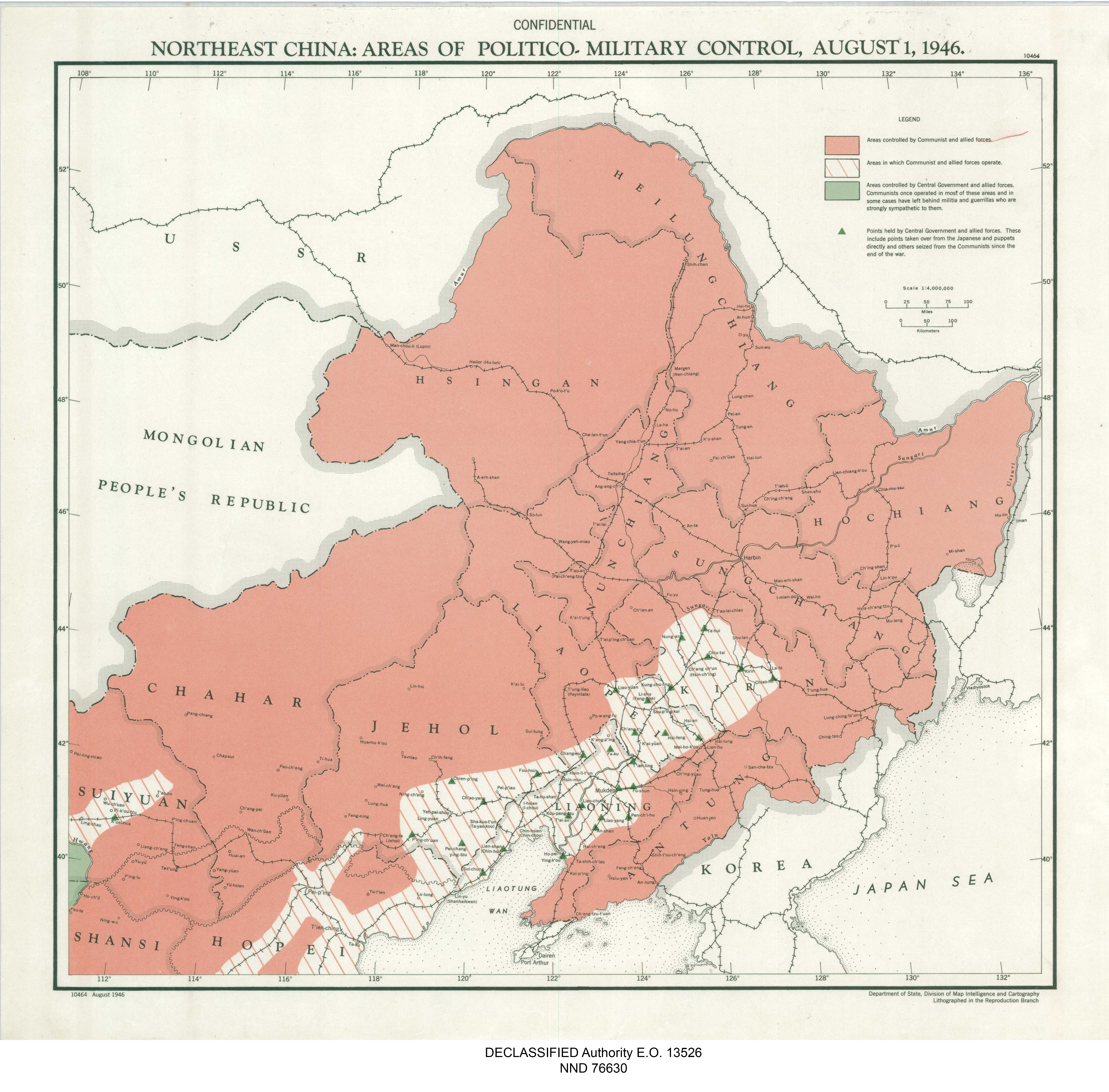
Areas of politico-military control in Northeast China on 1 August 1946

Stalin ordered the invasion of Manchukuo on 9 August 1945, according to conditions of Tehran Conference and inaugurated in one of the largest campaigns in World War II. The Red Army steamrolled into Manchuria, brushing aside scattered Japanese resistance, and occupied Mengjiang (Inner Mongolia), southern Sakhalin, and the northern half of the Korean Peninsula as well. The rapid defeat of the Kwantung Army in Manchuria, along with the recent atomic bombing of Hiroshima and Nagasaki by the Americans, contributed significantly to the Japanese surrender on the 15th.

The invasion, along with the surrender, prompted the Kuomintang to jockey for position vis-à-vis the Chinese Communist Party (CCP) in mainland China. The Kuomintang signed the Treaty of Friendship and Alliance with the Soviet Union on 14 August 1945, which affirmed Chinese sovereignty over Manchuria in exchange for Chinese recognition of the Soviet-aligned Mongolian People's Republic.

The combined impact of the Soviet invasion and the atomic bombings left Japan little room for maneuver. On 15 August 1945, Emperor Hirohito announced Japan's unconditional surrender to the Japanese people over radio, marking the end of World War II.

In September 1945, the CCP dispatched soldiers to Soviet-occupied Manchuria. The CCP obtained Japanese arms with Soviet help. The Soviet stance regarding the CCP and the Chinese Nationalists oscillated during this period, and in November 1945 the Soviet Union requested that the CCP withdraw from major cities in Manchuria. Chiang Ching-kuo met with Stalin in January 1946 on the issue, and Stalin contended that the Soviet Army had shed blood in defeating the Japanese in Manchuria and therefore Japanese enterprises which had served the Kwantung army should be treated as trophies for the Red Army.

Between September and November 1945, the Soviet Union removed machinery from Japanese industrial plants in Manchuria and took them for use in the Soviet Union. The removal of industrial equipment to the Soviet Union significantly reduced the industrial capacity Manchuria, which was, at the time, the only region of China with significant heavy industry.

Estimated loss of Manchurian productive capacity from Soviet occupation
Industry	Percentage capacity lost
Electric power	71%
Iron and steel	51%-100%
Metal working	80%
Non-Ferrous Mining (excluding coal)	75%
Liquid fuels and lubricants	65%
Cement	50%
Chemicals	50%
Textiles	75%
Paper and pulp	30%
Radio, telegraph, and telephone	20%-100%

The Soviets began withdrawing from Manchuria within three weeks of Japan's surrender, although they would delay the process several times. The resumption of the Chinese Civil War in early 1946 prompted the Red Army to finish the withdrawal, but not before secretly turning much of Manchuria over to the CCP in March in violation of the Agreement.

== See also ==
- Soviet occupation of Mongolia
- Soviet occupations
