= Emblem of South Korea =

National Emblem of the Republic of Korea 대한민국의 국장
- Armiger: Republic of Korea
- Adopted: 10 December 1963; 62 years ago
- Motto: 대한민국 (Republic of Korea)

The National Emblem of the Republic of Korea (Korean: 대한민국의 국장; Hanja: 大韓民國의 國章), also officially referred as Naramunjang (Korean: 나라문장; Hanja: 나라紋章, lit. 'State emblem'), consists of the taegeuk symbol present on the South Korean national flag surrounded by five stylized petals and a ribbon bearing the inscription of the official Korean name of the country (Daehanminguk), in Korean characters. The Taegeuk represents peace and harmony. The five petals all have meaning and are related to South Korea's national flower, the Hibiscus syriacus, or Rose of Sharon (Korean: 무궁화; Hanja: 無窮花, mugunghwa).

The emblem was announced on 10 December 1963. According to Brian Reynolds Myers, the flower and taegeuk symbols are generally considered by South Koreans to be symbolic of the "Korean ethnos" (Korean: 한민족).

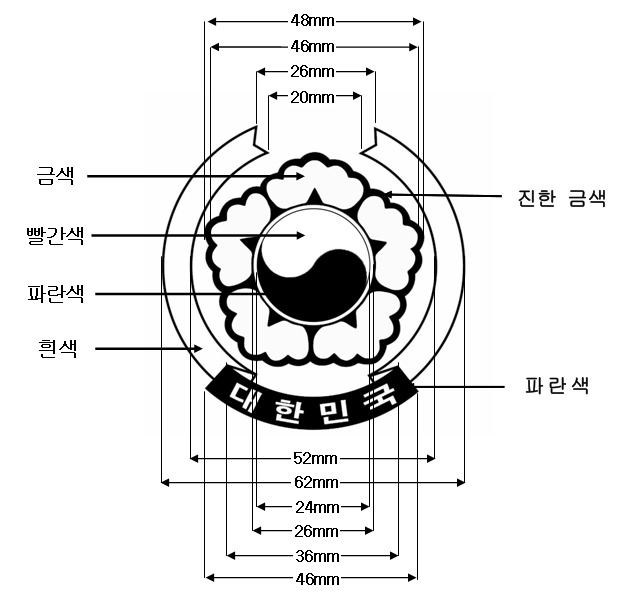
Construction sheet

== Historical national emblems ==
Emblem of Great Joseon (1884–1897)

Royal Emblem of Great Joseon

Imperial emblem of the Korean Empire (1897–1910)

Emblem of the Korean Empire (1903–1910)

Emblem of the Provisional Government of the Republic of Korea (1919–1945)

Emblem of South Korea (1948–1963)

Emblem of South Korea (1963–1984)

Emblem of South Korea (1984–1997)

Emblem of South Korea (1997–2016)

Emblem of South Korea (2016–present)

== Other national emblems ==
Seal of the United States Army Military Government in Korea (1945–1948)

Emblem of the People's Republic of Korea (1945–1946)

== Other emblems ==
=== Executive ===
Emblem of the National Government (1949–2016)

Emblem of the National Government, a stylized Taegeuk (2016–present)

Emblem of the Prime Minister: A rose of Sharon enclosed by another

Emblem of the Ministry of National Defense: A star superimposed on an anchor and two wings

=== Legislative ===
Emblem of the National Assembly (1948–2014)

Emblem of the National Assembly: The word "국회" meaning 'National Assembly' (gukhoe; 國會 in Hanja) appears in Korean characters in the center of a rose of Sharon

Emblem of a local council (1991–2014)

Emblem of a local council: The word "의회" meaning 'Assembly' (uihoe; 議會 in Hanja) appears in Korean characters in the center of a rose of Sharon

=== Judicial ===
Emblem of South Korean Court

Emblem of the Constitutional Court of Korea (1988–2017)

Emblem of the Constitutional Court of Korea (2017–present)

== Seals ==
Royal seal of Goryeo (1370–1392)

Seal of the Korean Empire (1897–1910)

Seal of the Provisional Government of Korea (1911–1945)

National seal of the Republic of Korea

== Gallery ==
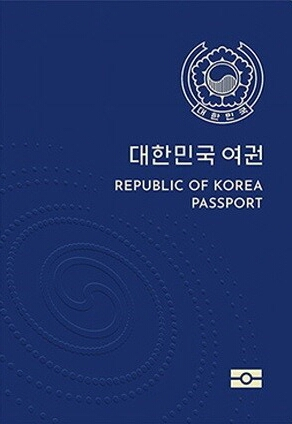
South Korean passport

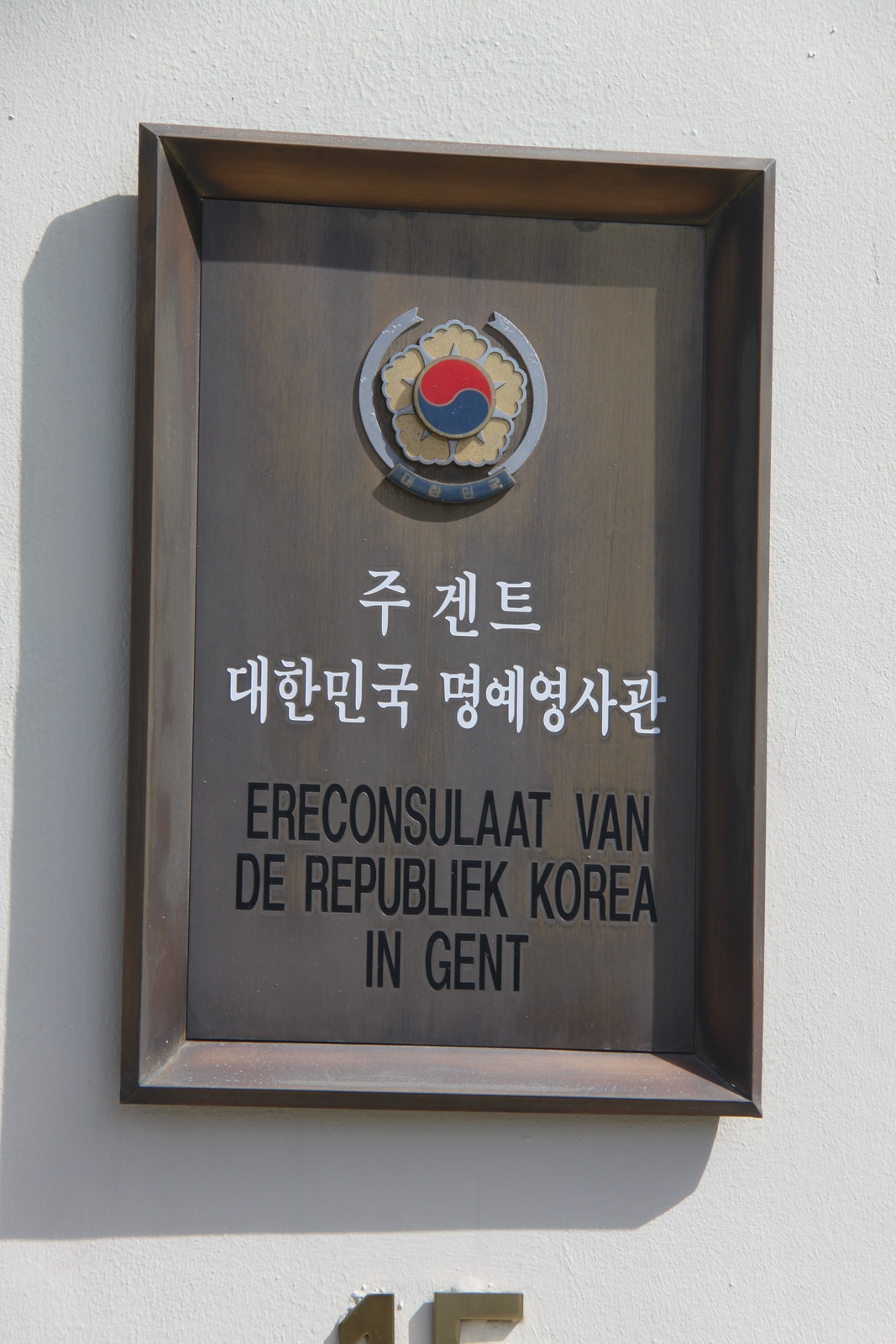
Emblem on South Korean Honorary Consul in Gent, Belgium

== See also ==
- Seal of South Korea
- Flag of South Korea
- Emblem of North Korea
- Imperial Seal of Korea, uses plum blossom instead
- Taegeuk
