= Flag of Manchukuo =

Manchukuo
- National flag of Manchukuo
- Use: Civil and state flag, civil ensign
- Proportion: 2∶3
- Adopted: March 1, 1932
- Relinquished: August 17, 1945
- Naval ensign
- Use: Naval ensign
- Proportion: 2∶3
- Imperial Standard of Manchukuo
- Proportion: 2∶3
- Adopted: 1934

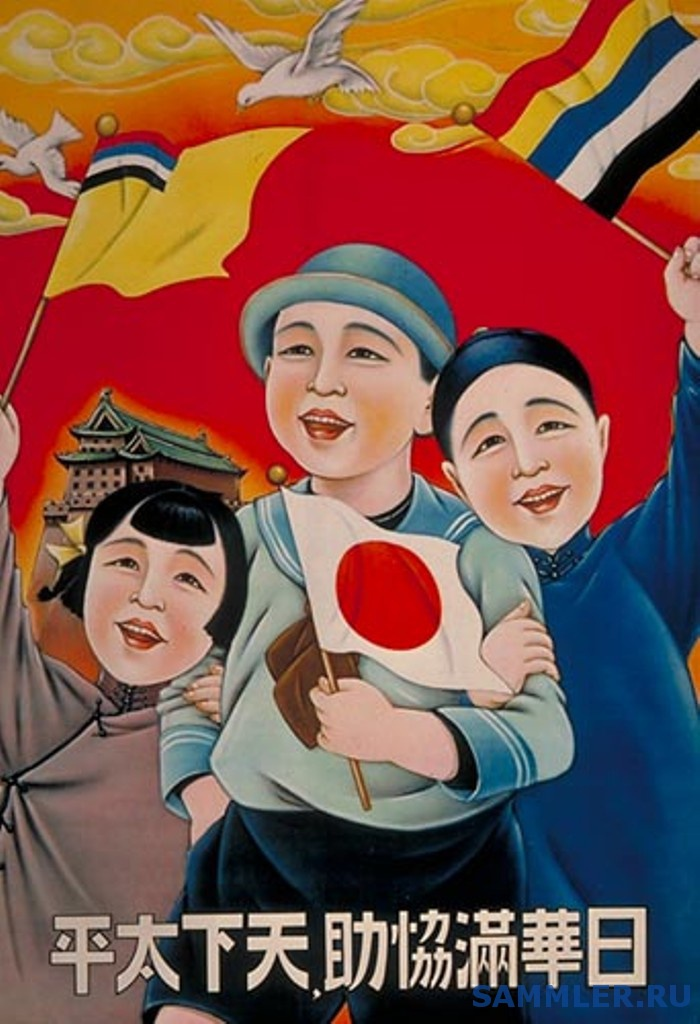
Propaganda art of children with Manchukuo, Japanese and Five Races Under One Union flags.

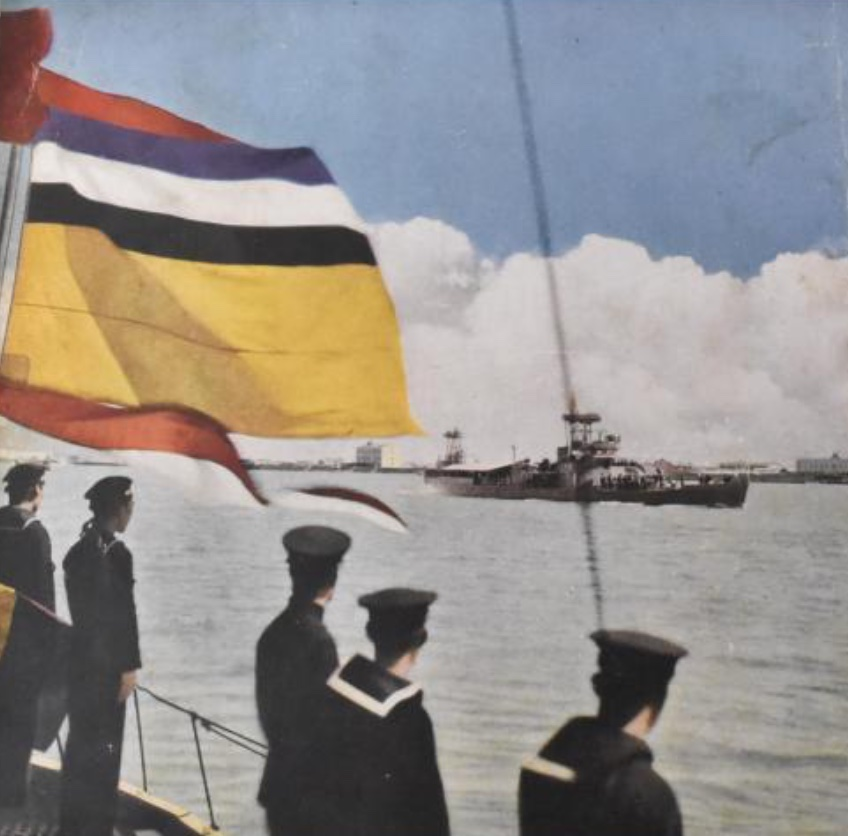
Picture taken aboard the PR Ting Pien with Manchukuo naval ensign in 1939.

The flag of Manchukuo had a yellow field with four horizontal stripes of different colors in the upper left corner. The colors of the flag were based on the colors on the Five Races Under One Union flags used by the Beiyang government, the Empire of China, and by the Fengtian clique. The flag was first established in Announcement of National Flag on March 1, 1932.

== Description ==
According to the Document of the Explanation of National Flag issued by the State Council of Manchukuo on February 24, 1933, the colors on the flag represent the four directions and center. The Study of Manchukuo National Flag published by state council of Manchukuo later also gave a representative based on Five Elements.

- Yellow represents the center and the Manchus; rule of emperor of four directions and virtue of Ren in Confucianism, and earth in the Five Elements.
- Red represents the south and the Han, passion and courage, and fire in the Five Elements.
- Blue represents the east and the Mongols, youthfulness and holiness, and wood in the Five Elements.
- White represents the west and the Japanese, purity and justice, and gold in the Five Elements.
- Black represents the north and the Koreans, will and determination, and water in the Five Elements.

Manchukuo naval rank flags were similar in design to those of the Soviet Navy but retained the national colors.

== Other flags ==
=== Manchukuo Imperial Navy ===
==== 1932–1935 ====
Flag of an admiral

Flag of a vice admiral

Flag of a rear admiral

Flag of a 1st class commodore

==== 1935–1941 ====
Flag of the Navy Minister

Flag of an admiral

Flag of a vice admiral

Flag of a rear admiral

Flag of a 1st class commodore

Flag of a commander (2nd class commodore)

Flag of a superior commander

=== Coast Guard ===
Flag of the Manchukuo Shipping Office

Flag of marine support ships

Flag of the Manchukuo Coast Guard

=== Marine Police ===
Flag of the Marine Police

Flag of the Chief of Civil Administration

Flag of the Chief of Police Civil Administration

Flag of the Chief of Marine Police

Flag of the Marine Police Senior Officer at Present Afloat

=== Postal flag ===
Postal flag of Manchukuo

=== Political organizations ===
Flag of the Concordia Association

=== Boy Scouts of Manchukuo ===
Flag of the Boy Scouts of Manchukuo

=== South Manchuria Railway Company ===
Flag of the South Manchuria Railway Company

== See also ==
- Imperial emblem of Manchukuo
- List of Chinese flags
