= Harbin Confucius Temple =

Confucian temple in Harbin, China

- 哈尔滨文庙
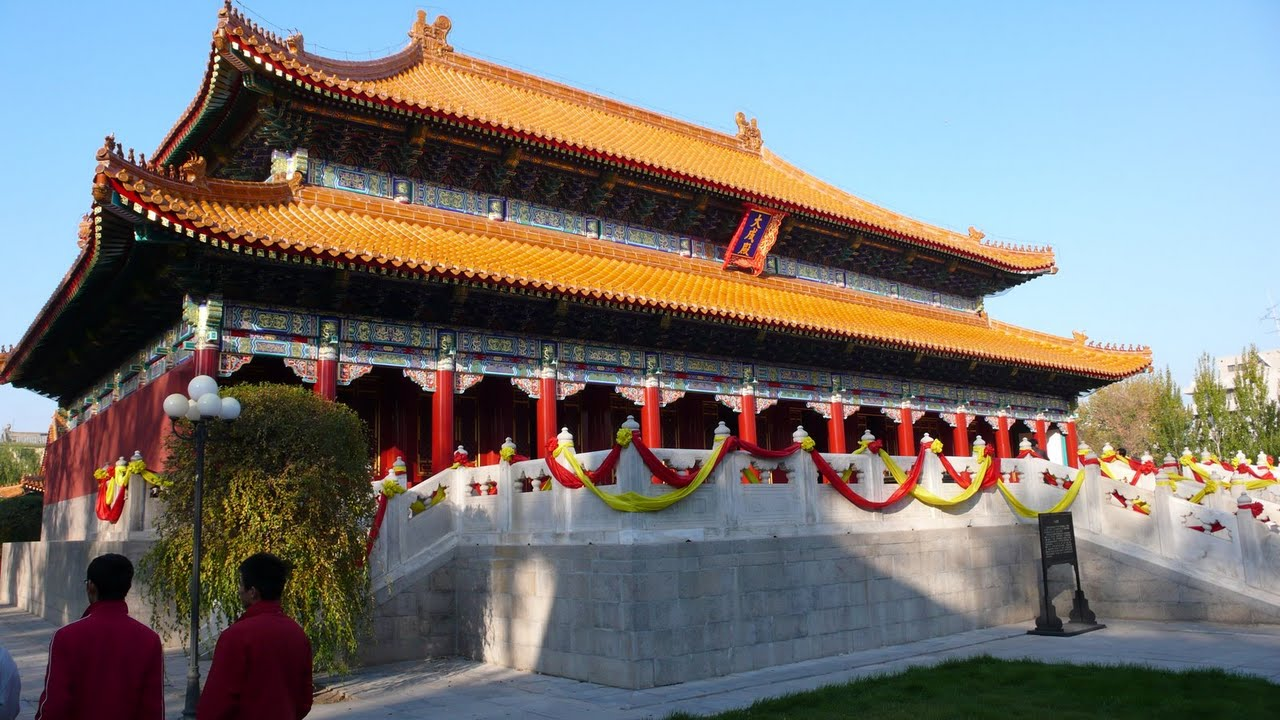
- Dacheng Hall of the Harbin Confucius Temple

Religion
- Affiliation: Confucianism

Location
- Location: Within the HEU
- Country: China
- Interactive map of Harbin Confucius Temple

Architecture
- Style: Imitation of Qing Dynasty
- Groundbreaking: 1926
- Completed: 1929
- Construction cost: 730,000 Harbin silver dollar notes

Harbin Confucius Temple (simplified Chinese: 哈尔滨文庙; traditional Chinese: 哈爾濱文廟), or Harbin Confucian Temple, is a Confucian temple located on Confucian Temple Street (文庙街), Nangang District (南岗区), Harbin City, Heilongjiang Province. The Temple is a typical building complex imitating the architectural style of the Qing Dynasty.

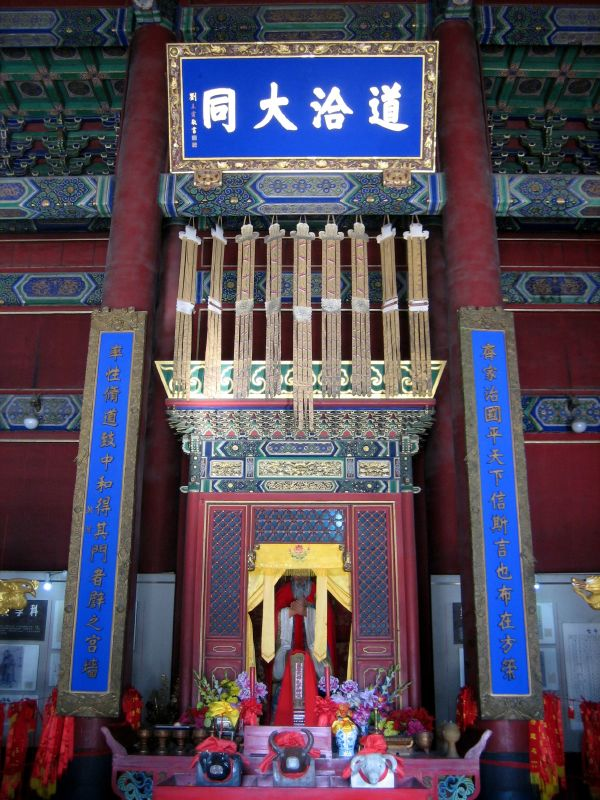

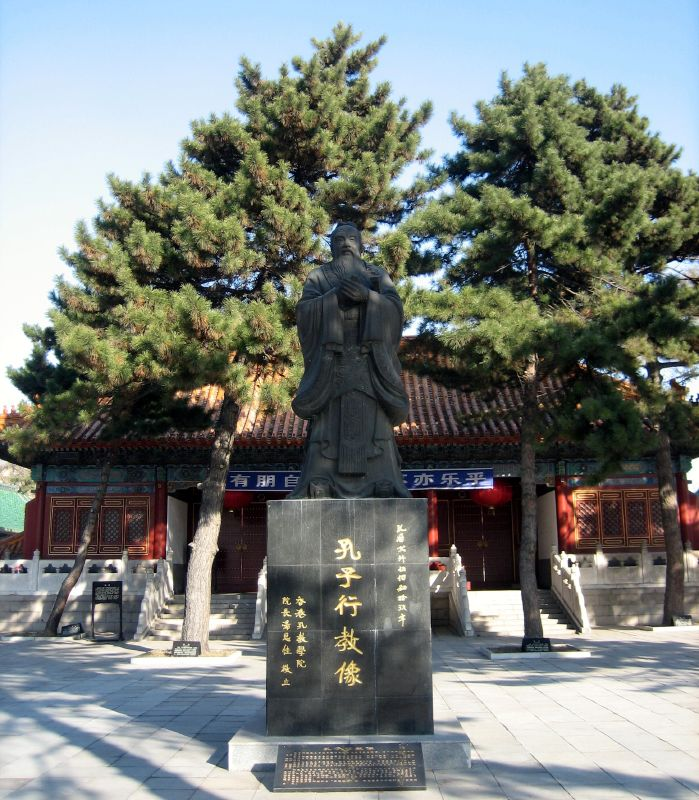

Located within the courtyard of Harbin Engineering University, Harbin Confucius Temple is the largest Confucian temple in Northeast China. In the whole of China, its scale is second only to Qufu Confucius Temple and Beijing Confucius Temple.

It houses the Heilongjiang Museum of Nationalities (simplified Chinese: 黑龙江省民族博物馆; traditional Chinese: 黑龍江省民族博物館).

== History ==
The construction of the Harbin Confucius Temple began in 1926 and was completed in 1929, costing 730,000 Harbin silver dollar notes (哈大洋).

In November 1996, Harbin Confucius Temple was included as the fourth batch of China's Major Historical and Cultural Site Protected at the National Level.
