= Museum of the Imperial Palace of Manchukuo =

Chinese museum in Changchun, Jilin

- 伪满皇宫博物院
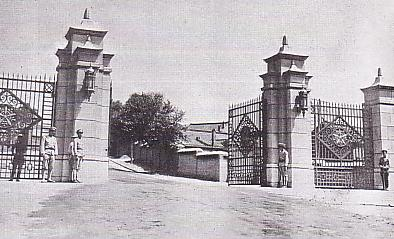
- Established: 1962
- Location: Changchun, Jilin, China
- Coordinates: 43°54′13″N 125°20′32″E
- Website: Official website

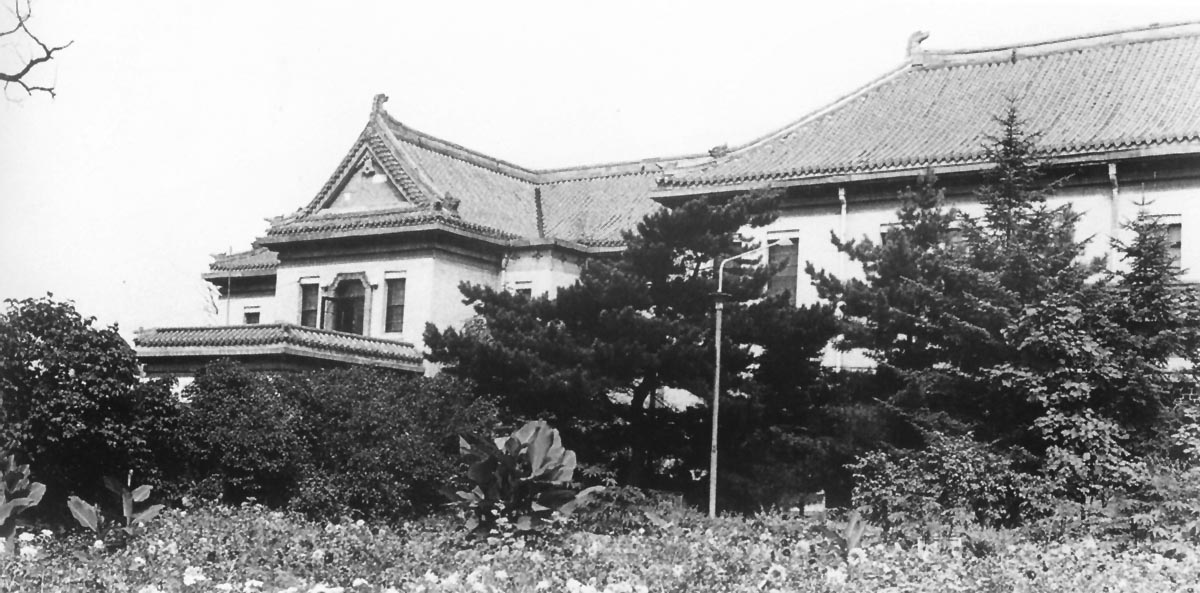
Tongde Hall of the Manchukuo Imperial Palace

The Museum of the Imperial Palace of "Manchukuo" (Note: In the People's Republic of China, the English name is often written with quotation marks, or "puppet" is added in front.) (simplified Chinese: 伪满皇宫博物院; traditional Chinese: 偽滿皇宮博物院; pinyin: Wěi Mǎn Huánggōng Bówùyuàn) is a museum in the northeastern corner of Changchun, Jilin province, northeast China. The palace was the official residence created by the Imperial Japanese Army for the last emperor of China, Puyi, to live in as part of his role as emperor of the Japanese puppet state of Manchukuo. The museum currently uses either Palace Museum of the Manchurian Regime or Palace Museum of the Puppet Manchukuo as its official English name for external use. It is classified as a AAAAA scenic area by the China National Tourism Administration.

== History ==
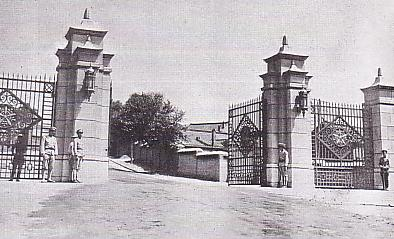
The palace gates

In 1931, the Japanese took control of the north-east of China, the area of modern-day Liaoning, Jilin and Heilongjiang provinces, which were historically known as Manchuria. The Japanese created an officially independent state in Manchuria which they named Manchukuo which was, in reality, a puppet state of Japan. In an attempt to lend legitimacy to Manchukuo, the Japanese installed Puyi, the deposed last emperor of Qing dynasty China, as Emperor of Manchukuo.

Puyi's role as head of state was largely a symbolic one. The only item of state business he was allowed to control was the construction of a new palace. Two groups within the government put forward different plans. The Mantetsu wanted a modern palace design that integrated itself into the new city of Hsinking (modern-day Changchun). The Construction Corps Bureau favoured a south-facing palace modelled after the Forbidden City in Beijing. Puyi favoured the latter. The site for the new palace was chosen in the western section of the city, and a different central area was picked for the construction of a temporary palace. The western site was soon abandoned leaving the central site as the main palace. However, with the onset of World War II, resources for construction were diverted. Work on the palace was halted in 1943 and, as a result, the new palace was never completed.

Without a proper palace, Puyi was accommodated instead in a building outside the urban area, near the railway lines. The building had previously been the offices of the Salt Gabelle, lending the building the nickname of the "salt palace". The building was unsuitable for its purpose, and was too small and cramped for the palace of a head of state. Puyi was resident there from 1932 to 1945.

On 8 August 1945, the Soviet Union declared war on the Empire of Japan, and the Soviet Red Army invaded Manchuria from the north. In 12 days, the Red Army had overrun almost all of Manchukuo. The Japanese Empire surrendered unconditionally, ending World War II, and simultaneously Manchukuo ceased to exist. Puyi fled the palace, attempting to reach Japan by plane, but was captured by the Soviets. The palace and surrounding city were looted.

In 1962, the preserved structures were opened as the Exhibition Museum of the Puppet Palace (simplified Chinese: 伪皇宫陈列馆; traditional Chinese: 偽皇宮陳列館). The name was changed to its current one in 2001, the Palace Museum of the Manchurian Regime. The exhibits were expanded with those of the Jilin Provincial Museum in 1982, and renovated in 1984. The entire complex was further renovated in 2004. The palace was the setting of Bernardo Bertolucci's 1987 biographical film about Puyi, The Last Emperor, depicting Puyi's reign as Emperor of Manchukuo.

== Structures ==
The Manchurian Imperial Palace was designed as a miniature version of the Forbidden City in Beijing. It was divided into an inner court and outer court. The outer or front court was used for administrative purposes and the inner or rear court as the royal residence. The palace covers an area of 43,000 square meters.

The inner court includes the private living quarters for Puyi and his family. Its main structures include the Jixi Building on the west courtyard and the Tongde Hall on the east courtyard. The outer court contained buildings for affairs of state. Its main buildings include the Qianmin Building, the Huanyuan Building and Jiale Hall. The architecture of the buildings is in a wide range of styles: Chinese, Japanese, and European.

Within the complex were gardens, including rockeries and a fish pond, a swimming pool, air-raid shelter, a tennis court, a small golf course and a horse track.

Around the courtyards were nine two-storey blockhouses for the Manchukuo Imperial Guard, and the entire complex was surrounded by high concrete walls.

=== Jixi Building ===
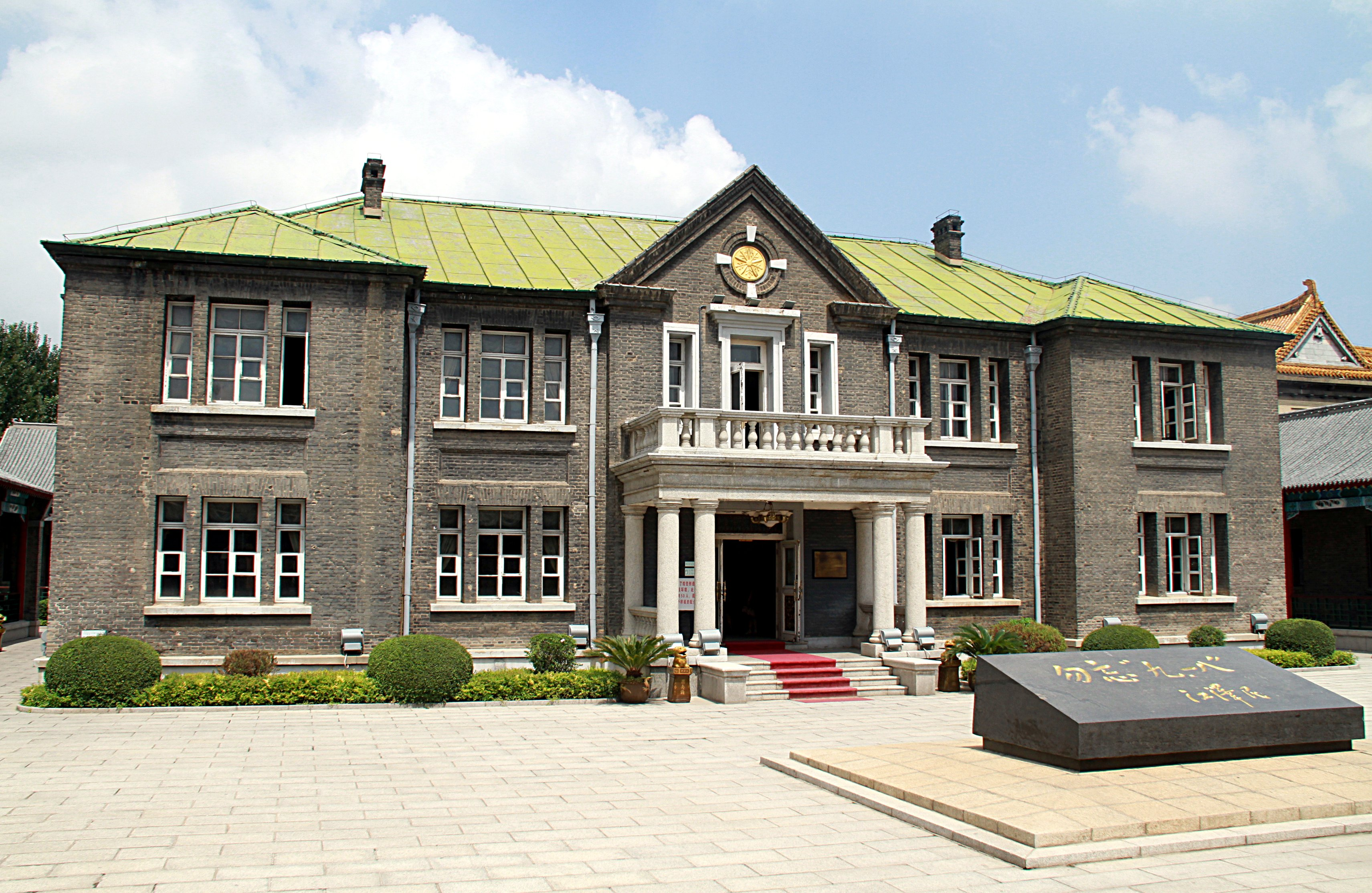
Jixi Building

The Jixi Building (缉熙楼) was the Russian-style private living quarters for the emperor and his immediate family. It contained Puyi's bedroom, reading room, the family hall, Buddhist chapel and the separate quarters for Empress Wanrong and the concubine Tan Yuling. Originally it was the office building of the Jilin-Heilongjiang Exclusive Transportation Bureau, and was built in the early 20th century.

=== Tongde Hall ===
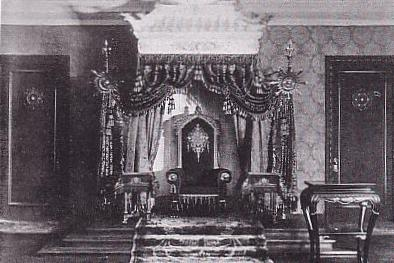
The throne room in the 1930s.

The Tongde Hall (同德殿) is the largest and most impressive of the buildings in the palace, and has the most luxurious interior decoration. Originally the Jilin Salt Tax Collection Office, and therefore sometimes referred to as the "Salt Palace", Japanese engineers remodeled it from 1936 to 1938. However, Puyi refused to use the building, as he believed it to be bugged. The main hall was the setting for a dance party scene in Bernardo Bertolucci's film The Last Emperor, although it was never actually used for that purpose.

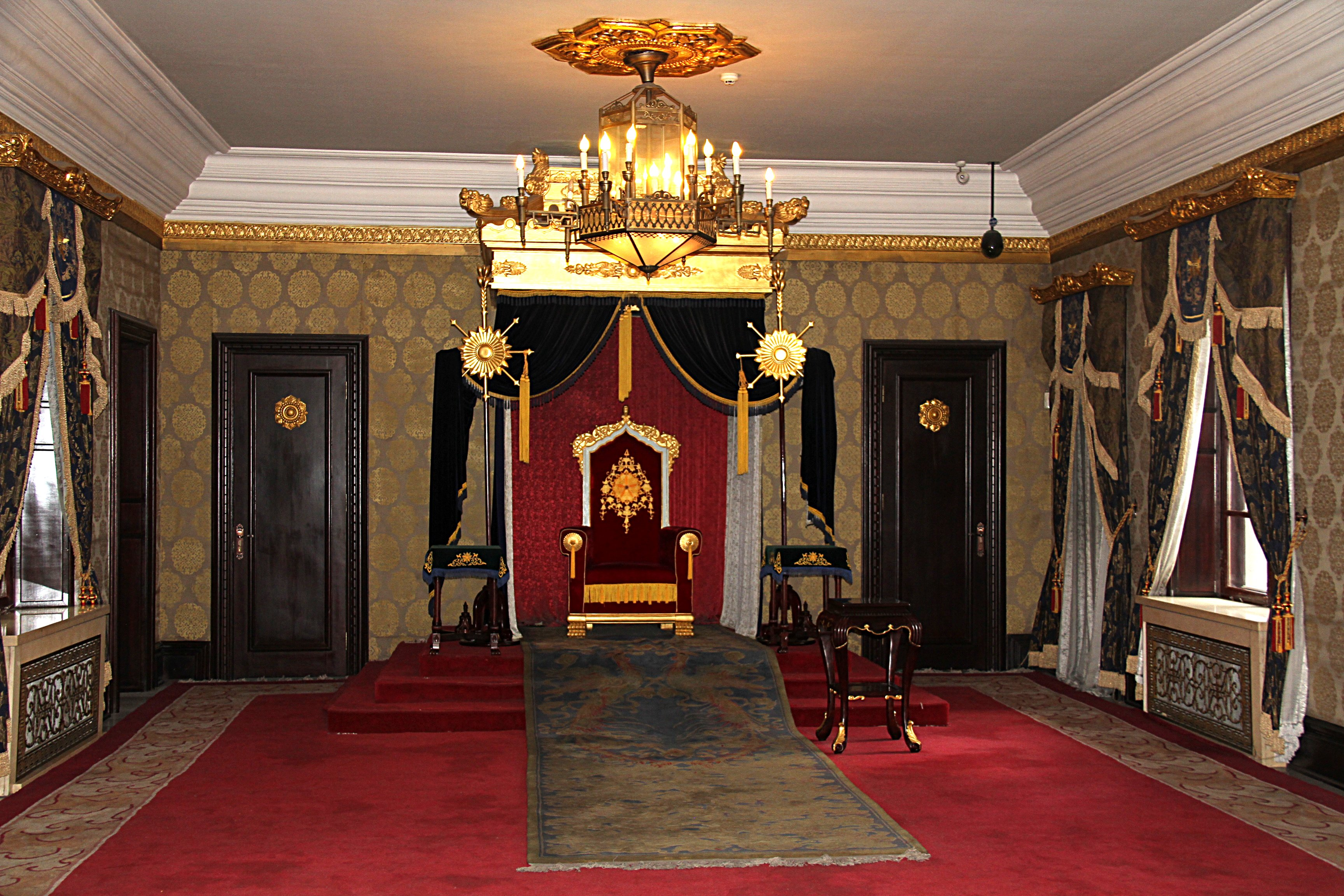
Throne of Manchukuo

The imperial concubine Li Yuqin was housed in the east part of the second floor. The building today contains the Manchukuo Throne, various pieces of furniture, some replicas of the crown jewels, flags, some dresses and uniforms, a copy of the Manchukuo declaration of independence, and other official items. High behind the throne is the national coat of arms, with a five-point star, in different colors representing the five nationalities of Manchukuo: Manchu (red), Chinese (yellow), Mongol (blue), Japanese (white) and Koreans (black).

=== Qinmin Building ===
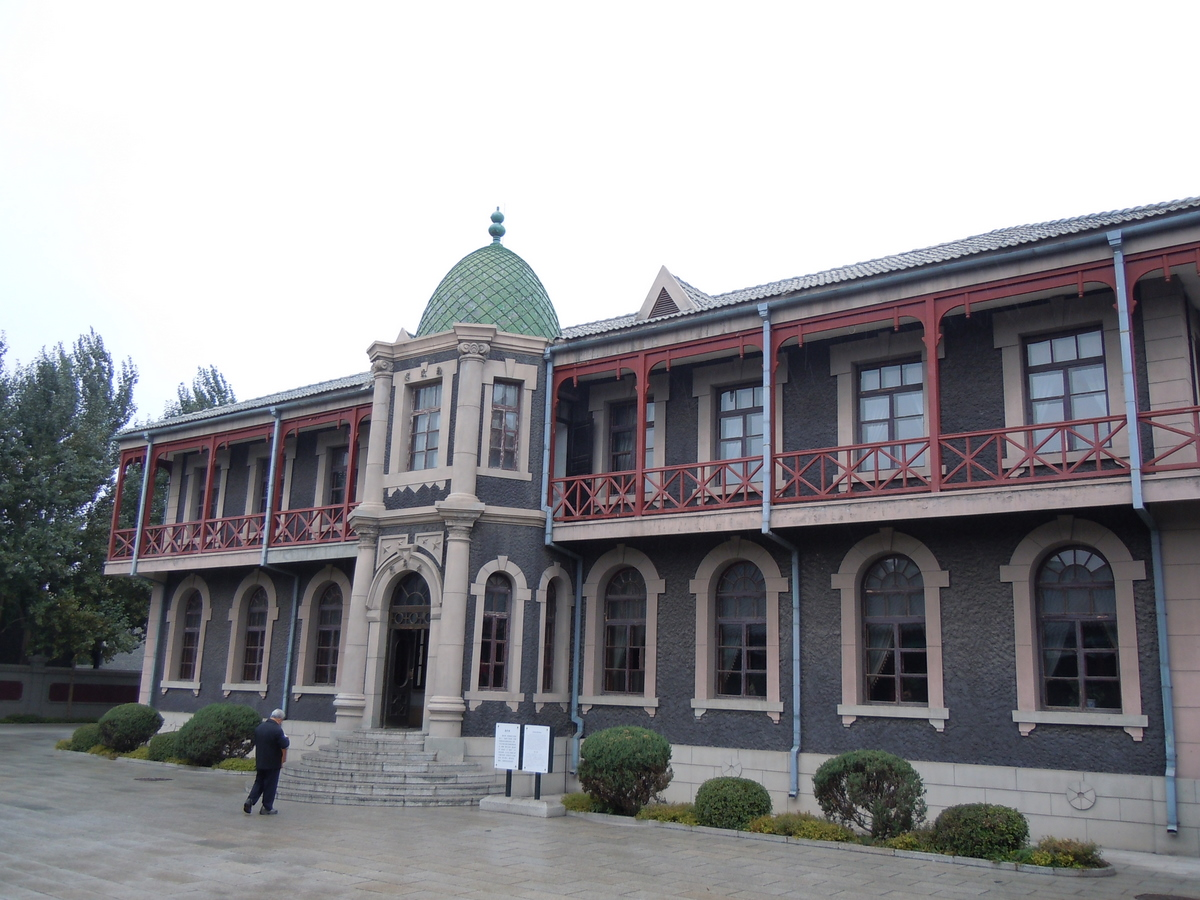
Qinmin Building

The Qinmin Building (勤民楼) was Puyi's office building. In its southeast corner is a large room where Puyi received foreign ambassadors and consuls, and issued certificates of appointment and conferred medals to his government officials. The Qinmin Building housed the Manchukuo throne, which has now been moved to the Tongde Hall for its museum display.

Historical artifacts on display in the Qinmin Building include documents and photographs from Puyi's childhood to adulthood and wax figures of Puyi with one of his wives. Additional exhibitions highlight war crime atrocities from World War II such as incidents related to Unit 731.

=== Zhixiu House ===
Zhixiu House (植秀轩) was a detached structure built in the early 1930s. It was used as an informal dining hall by Emperor Puyi. A portion of Puyi's cash and jewels were kept in the two safes in the back apartment. After Puyi's second younger sister married Zheng Guangyuan, they lived here for a time. When the Tongde Building was completed, this structure was transformed into a school for the children of the palace employees.

=== Changchun House ===
Changchun House (畅春轩) was another detached structure designed as a mirror image of Zhixue House to maintain symmetry in the palace layout. At first the fourth and the fifth younger sisters of Puyi lived here. In July 1937 it was the residence for Puyi's father, Prince Chun, when he visited briefly to congratulate Puyi on becoming Emperor. Afterwards, the residence was used by the imperial concubine Tan Yuling.

=== Huaiyuan Building ===
The Huaiyuan Building (怀远楼) was built in the autumn of 1934 as an office for the Manchukou Imperial Household Agency, housing the Imperial Secretariat and various inner palace departments. It also contained the Fengxian Chapel where Puyi worshipped his ancestral portraits and memorial tablets.

=== Siheyuan ===
The Siheyuan was another structure of the Inner Palace. Dating from the early 20th century, it was originally the mansion of Wei Zonglian, the head of Jilin-Heilongjiang Exclusive Transportation Bureau. After the creation of the palace, it was used as an office for the executive department, housing the offices of the Japanese vice-minister and related officials.

== See also ==
- List of museums in China
