= Imperial emblem of Manchukuo =

Heraldic seal

Emblem of the Emperor of Manchukuo
- Armiger: Emperor of Manchukuo
- Adopted: 1934
- Relinquished: 1945

The emblem of the Emperor of Manchukuo (Chinese: 蘭花御紋徽) had a design of orchid (Cymbidium goeringii) flower, with five sorghum branches in between the five orchid petals. It was entirely yellow.

The design was based on Cymbidium goeringii, the favorite flower of the Emperor of Manchukuo. Sorghum was the staple food of Manchukuo and was added as a part of the design.

The imperial emblem was adopted on 25 April 1934. It also appeared on the Emperor of Manchukuo's personal standard.

== Gallery ==
Flag of the Emperor of Manchukuo

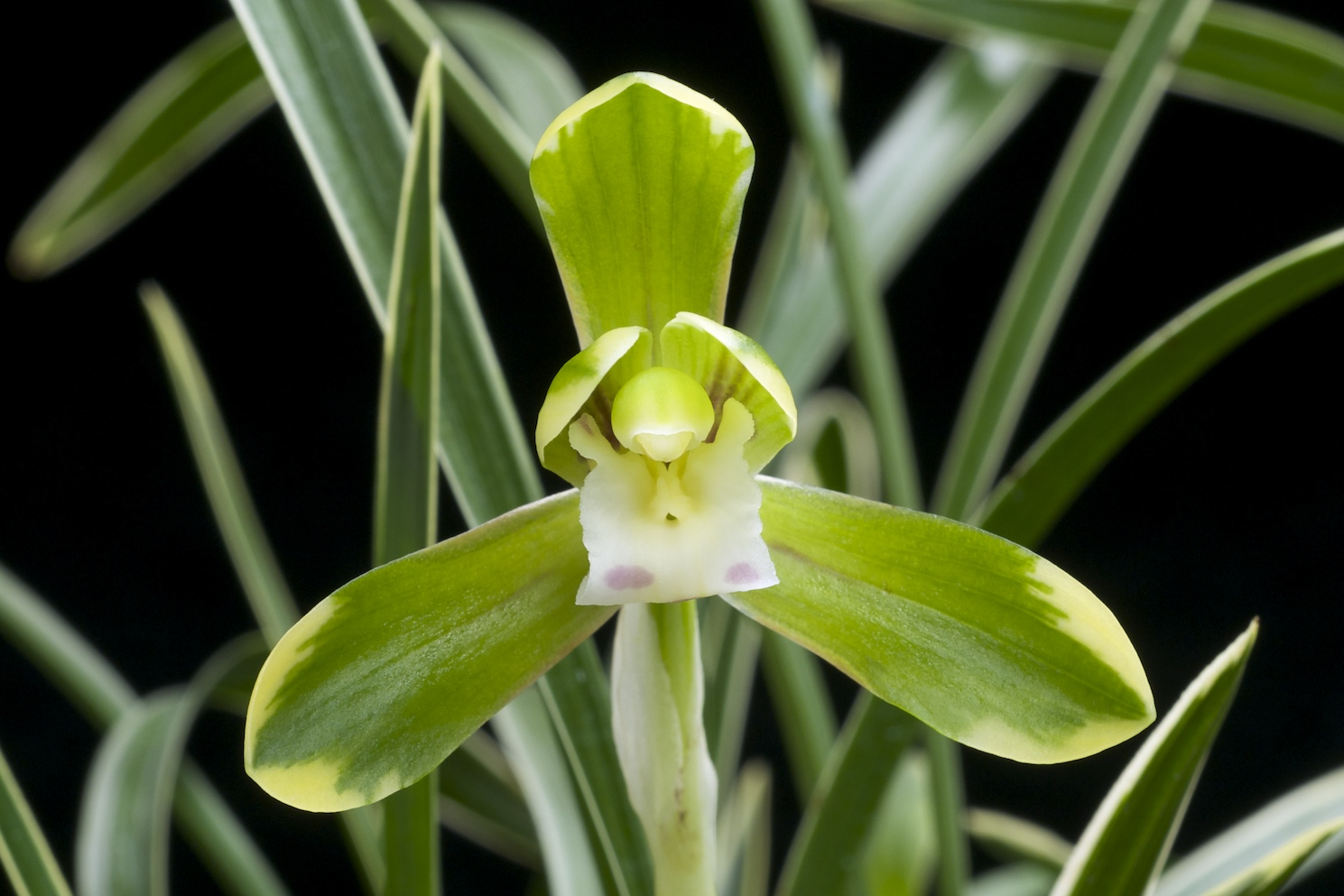
Cymbidium goeringii

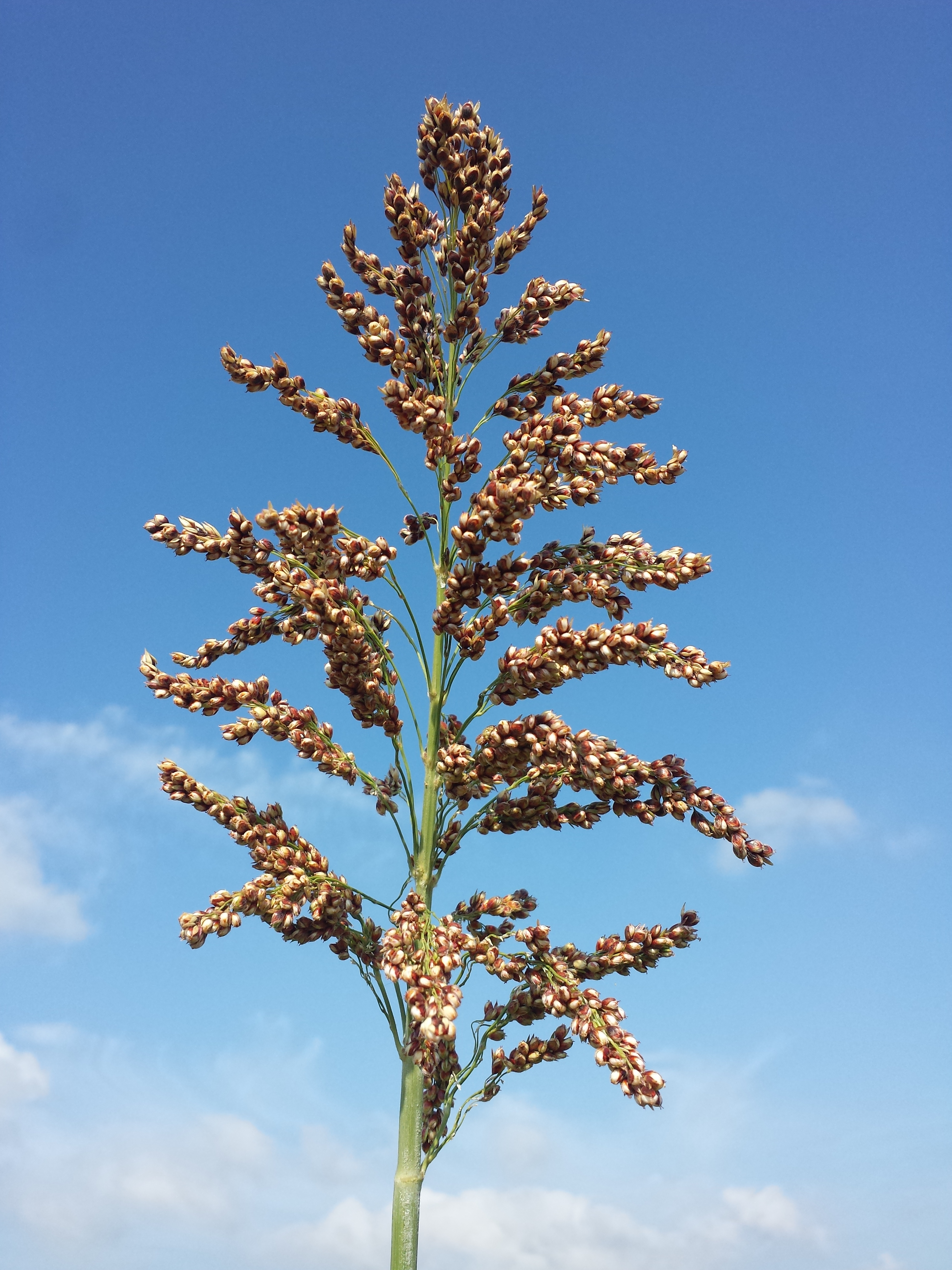
Sorghum branches

== See also ==
- Flag of Manchukuo
- Heirloom Seal of the Realm
- Imperial Seal of Japan
- Imperial Seal of Korea
