= Emblem of North Korea =

National Emblem of the Democratic People's Republic of Korea
- Armiger: Democratic People's Republic of Korea
- Adopted: 8 September 1948 (original version); 20 October 1993 (current version)
- Motto: 조선민주주의인민공화국 (Democratic People's Republic of Korea)

- National Emblem of the Democratic People's Republic of Korea
- Chosŏn'gŭl: 조선민주주의인민공화국의 국장
- Hancha: 朝鮮民主主義人民共和國의 國章
- Revised Romanization: Joseon minjujuui inmin gonghwagugui gukjang
- McCune–Reischauer: Chosŏn minjujuŭi inmin konghwagugŭi kukchang

The National Emblem of the Democratic People's Republic of Korea is one of the national symbols of North Korea. Prominent features on the emblem are a red star, a hydroelectric plant (the Sup'ung Dam) and Mount Paektu. The design bears similarities to the emblem of the Soviet Union and other emblems done in the socialist heraldic style. The emblem was designed by Kim Chu-gyŏng, a painter and a principal of the Pyongyang Art College who also designed the national flag.

== Description ==
The national emblem of the Democratic People's Republic of Korea bears the design of a grand hydroelectric power station under Mt. Paektu, the sacred mountain of the revolution, and the beaming light of a five-pointed red star, with ears of rice forming an oval frame, bound with a red ribbon bearing the inscription "The Democratic People’s Republic of Korea."

— Article 169 of the Socialist Constitution of the Democratic People's Republic of Korea (1972, amended 2013)

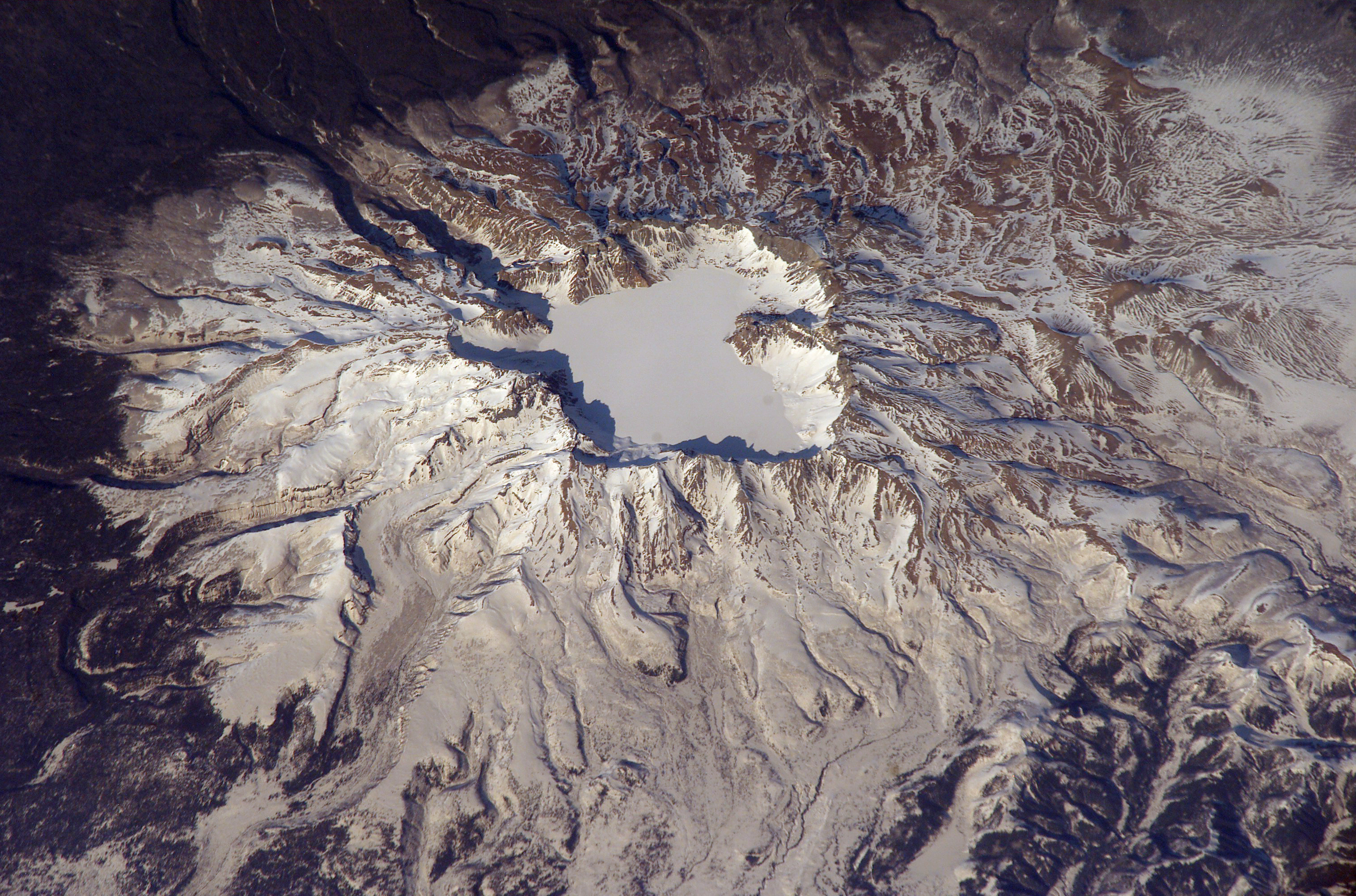
Mount Paektu (pictured) is featured prominently on the emblem

The emblem features the Sup'ung Dam under Mount Paektu and power lines as the escutcheon. The crest is a five-pointed shining red star. It is supported with ears of rice, bound with a red ribbon bearing the inscription "The Democratic People's Republic of Korea" in Chosŏn'gŭl characters.

While the design of the hydroelectric plant is generic in appearance, its identity is given away by the fact that Sup'ung was the only power station of its kind at the time when the emblem was designed. Sup'ung was constructed by the Japanese and is located in what is today the border with the People's Republic of China. In spite of the uncomfortable reference to colonial infrastructure as well as foreign territory, the choice of the image is not incidental and carries positive connotations. In the late 1940s, the northern half of Korea produced most of the electricity in the country. The dam symbolises self-sufficiency in electricity; in the spring of 1948, shortly before the hydroelectric plant was added to the emblem, North Korea cut off its power network from the South.

North Korean sources state that Mount Paektu represents the inheritance of the "revolutionary tradition" that started during the anti-Japanese struggle. The mountain holds high cultural significance by both North and South Korea and is revered by many Koreans. In North Korea, Mount Paektu is said to be where Kim Il Sung organised his guerilla army and is the official birthplace of Kim Jong Il.

The emblem, and all of its predecessors, follows the basic socialist heraldic design that was adopted in many other countries, which clearly indicates the relations between the communist ideology and the foundation of the country at the onset of the Cold War.

== History ==
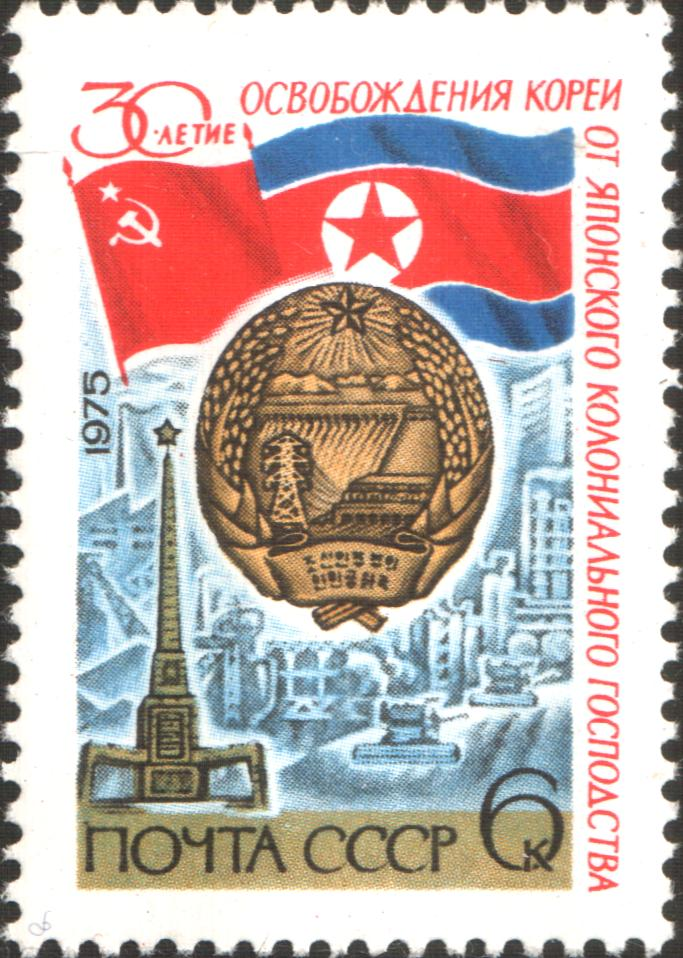
The 1948-93 version of the emblem on a 1975 Soviet postal stamp

During the occupation of northern Korea by the Soviet Union following the liberation of Korea, several emblems came to be used by the administration. The first equivalent of an emblem appeared on 1 January 1946, printed below a speech of Kim Il Sung in the newspaper Chŏngro. It features the Korean Peninsula surrounded by a pattern of ribbons and wheat identical to that of the Soviet State Emblem. This was the only known appearance of the emblem, and between 1946 and 1948 a simple outline of the peninsula was displayed in its place. This was intended to signal that the North and the South are one country.

As the division of Korea loomed, the issue of creating a new national emblem was raised at the third session of the People's Assembly of North Korea in November 1947. A draft emblem featuring a furnace with Mount Paektu and Heaven Lake in the background appeared in the provisional constitution in February 1948. That emblem was surrounded by two ears of rice wrapped by red ribbons bearing the official name of North Korea with a hammer and two sickles inside a shining red star at the top. The draft emblem appeared in the original flag of the Korean People's Army. Around July 1948, the emblem was revised, removing the hammer and sickles from the star and rearranging the wording of the name of the state that was yet to be established.

By August 1948, the emblem was redesigned yet again, replacing the image of the furnace with a hydroelectric power plant under a mountain range. One of the earliest known appearances of the emblem was during the general election that year. Accounts differ about the reason behind the hydroelectric plant being featured in the emblem. North Korean sources claim that Kim Il Sung ordered the change upon seeing the draft emblem as he felt the furnace did not represent North Korea's economic future and prosperity. However, according to Fyodor Tertitskiy, the change was likely ordered by the Soviets as the hydroelectric plant was one of the main industrial structures captured by the Red Army; it's unlikely that Kim Il Sung would have chosen to honor the Sup'ung Dam, built during the Japanese occupation of Korea, on a national symbol. The emblem was officially adopted following the formal adoption of the constitution on 8 September 1948.

On 9 April 1992, the constitution was amended which replaced the generic mountain range with Mount Paektu. However, the emblem with the generic mountain range continued to be used, appearing on coins issued the following year. Ultimately, the current version of the emblem was adopted when a law on the national emblem specified Mount Paektu as the mountain in the emblem on 20 October 1993. The change was likely done to further legitimise the Kim dynasty's power and Kim Jong Il's succession as leader.

== Construction ==
The national emblem law of 20 October 1993 specifies the colours and proportion of the national emblem.

Construction

== Historical national emblems ==
Emblem of Great Joseon (1884-1897)

Royal Emblem of Great Joseon

Imperial emblem of the Korean Empire (1897–1910)

Emblem of the Korean Empire (1903–1910)

Emblem of the Provisional Government of the Republic of Korea (1919–1945)

Emblem of the People's Republic of Korea (1945–1946)

Emblem of the Provisional People's Committee of North Korea (1946–1947)

Reconstruction of the first equivalent of an emblem published in Chŏngro in 1946

The draft emblem defined by the provisional constitution of February 1948

The draft emblem as revised in July 1948

The emblem used from 8 September 1948 until 20 October 1993; note the generic mountain range

The emblem used since 20 October 1993, revised to include Mount Paektu

Alternative emblem, sometimes seen at major events.

== Gallery ==
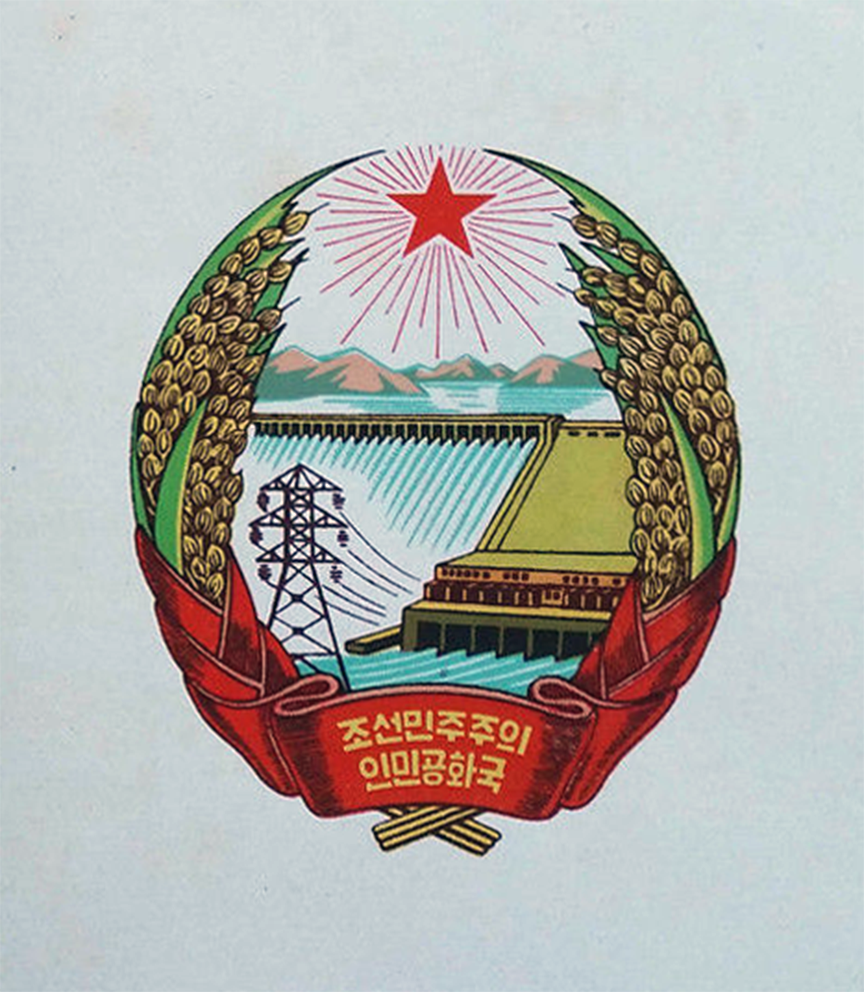
The emblem printed by the Foreign Languages Publishing House in a 1960 book

Emblem used by the President of the State Affairs of North Korea since 2016

Alternative emblem of the Korean People's Army since 2023, used on military flags and sometimes for major events.

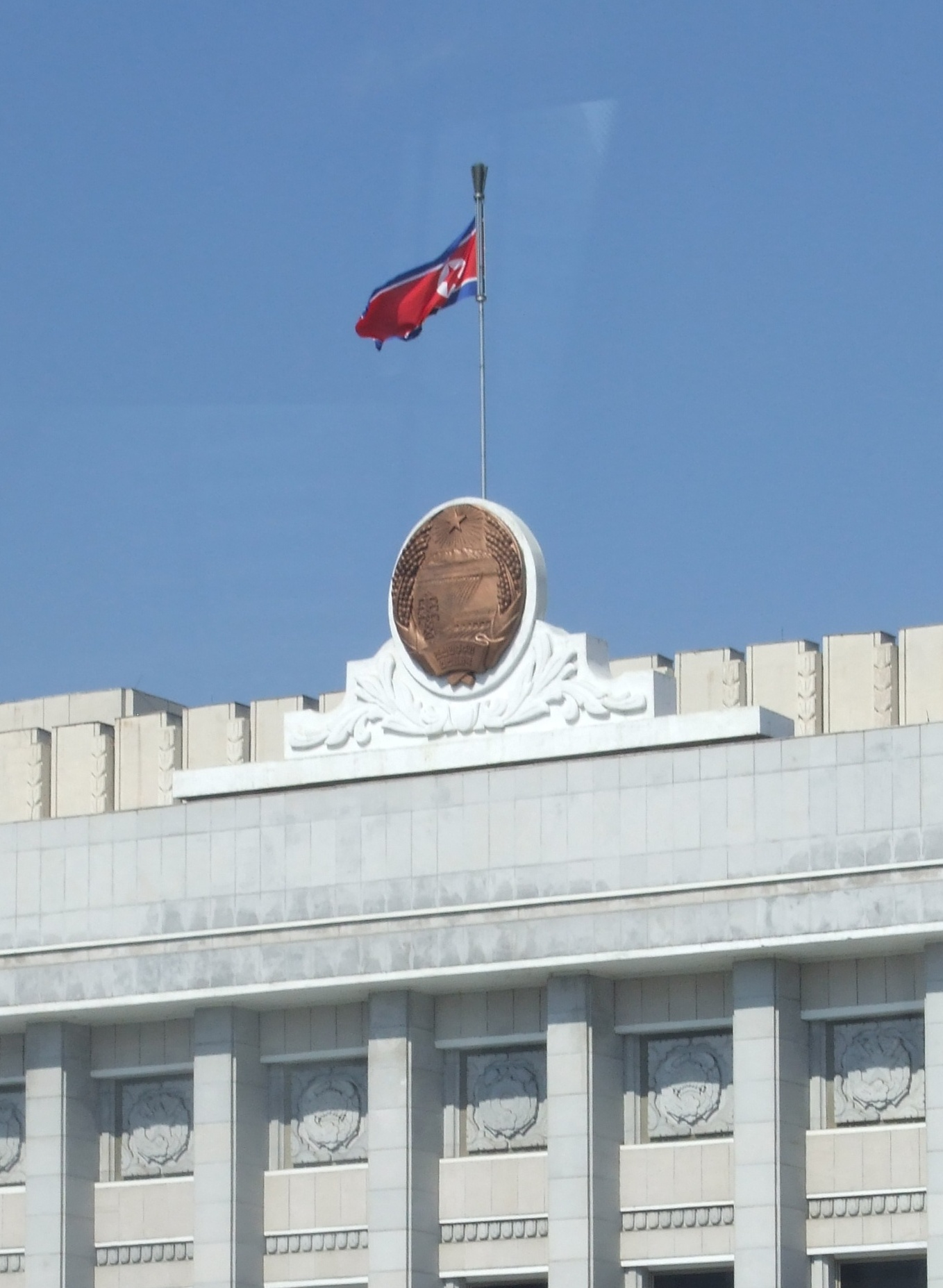
Emblem above the entrance to the Mansudae Assembly Hall

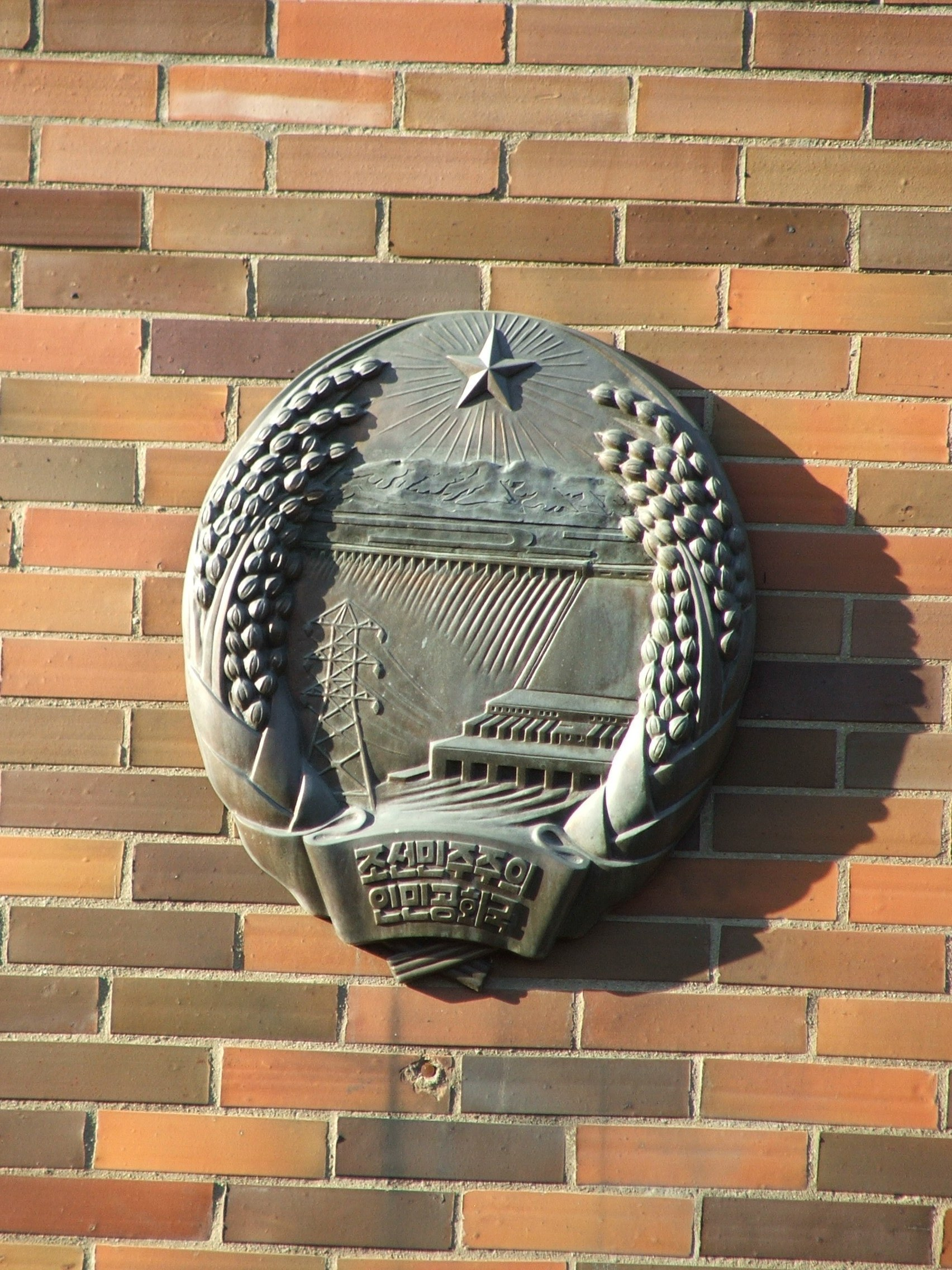
Emblem at the North Korean embassy in Prague

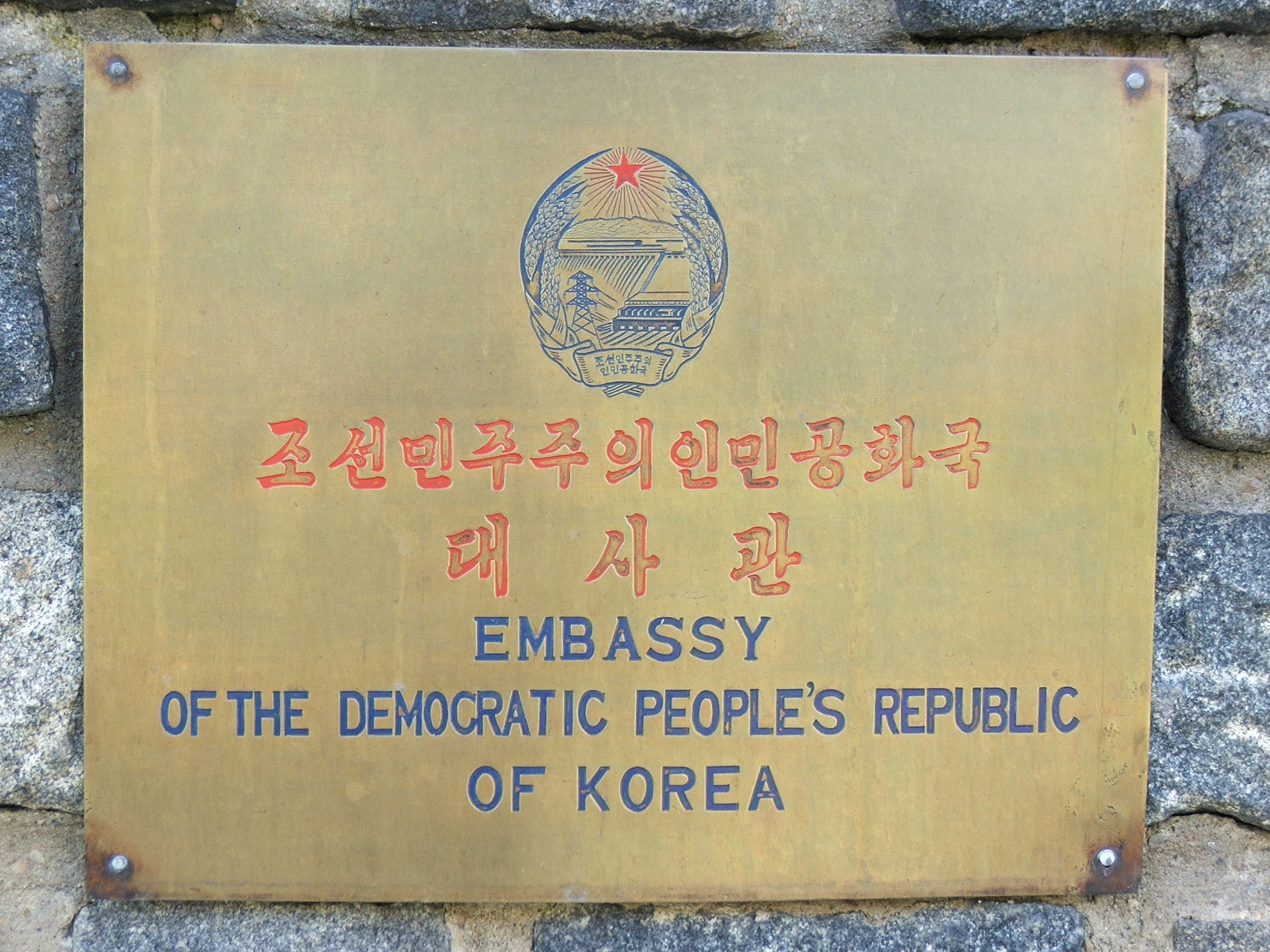
Emblem at the fence of the North Korean embassy in Prague

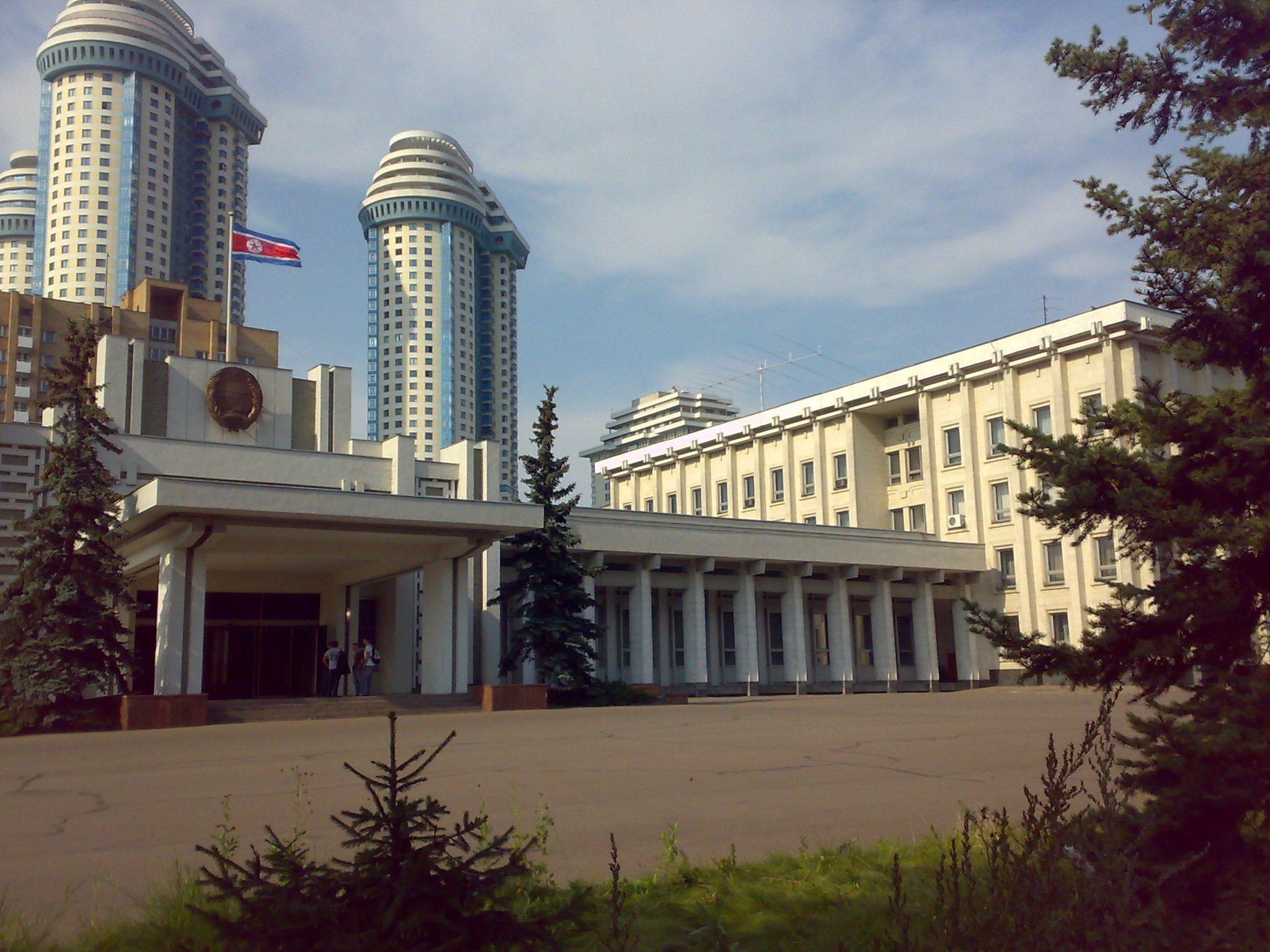
Emblem above the entrance to the North Korean embassy in Moscow.

== See also ==
- Flag of North Korea
- Emblem of South Korea
- Imperial Seal of Korea, uses plum blossom instead
- Taegeuk
