= Imperial emblem of Korea =

Symbol of the Korean Empire (1897–1910)

- Armiger: House of Yi

Imperial emblem of Korea
- Armiger: Emperor of Korea
- Adopted: 1903

The imperial emblem of Korea or Ihwamun (Korean: 이화문; Hanja: 李花紋) was one of the symbols of the Korean Empire. It was originally the emblem of the royal family and was subsequently used for the coat of arms of the short-lived empire. The symbol features a plum blossom (Korean: 이화; Hanja: 李花; RR: Ihwa; MR: Ihwa), also known as Maehwa, which signals the beginning of spring in Korea. Plum blossom was taken to symbolize courage in the face of hardship, especially in something so physically delicate, and has been long admired by the Korean and Chinese literature. As the Plum tree blossoms between two seasons, it is also seen as a symbol of spring - bringing warmth, transition and the promise of fruitfulness.

Since ancient times, plum blossom has been filled with meaning and mystery. Plum blossoms bloom at the end of the winter, and because of this, they are called the herald of spring. They also symbolize perseverance because of how they can possibly bloom during the cold winter. Since they are considered the first flower of the year, they also represent purity and renewal. Plum flowers have five petals which are believed to carry 5 different blessings such as: wealth, health, virtue, peaceful and natural death.

The imperial emblem of Korea first represented the Jeonju Yi clan. The symbol came into play as one of the royal symbols when the King Taejo of Joseon ascended the throne in a coup d'etat against King U of Goryeo. In 1897, King Gojong declared the Korean Empire and made the clan symbol the imperial emblem of Korea. Today, the emblem is used as a symbol of the Jeonju Lee Royal Family Association, a royal family association of the House of Yi, which was the royal family of Joseon dynasty and the imperial family of the Korean Empire.

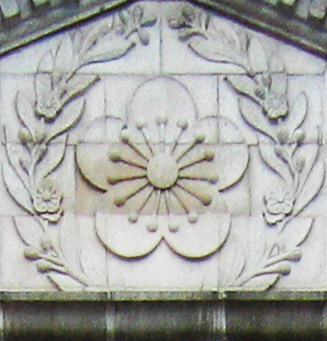
Seat at Seokjojeon Hall, Deoksugung in Seoul

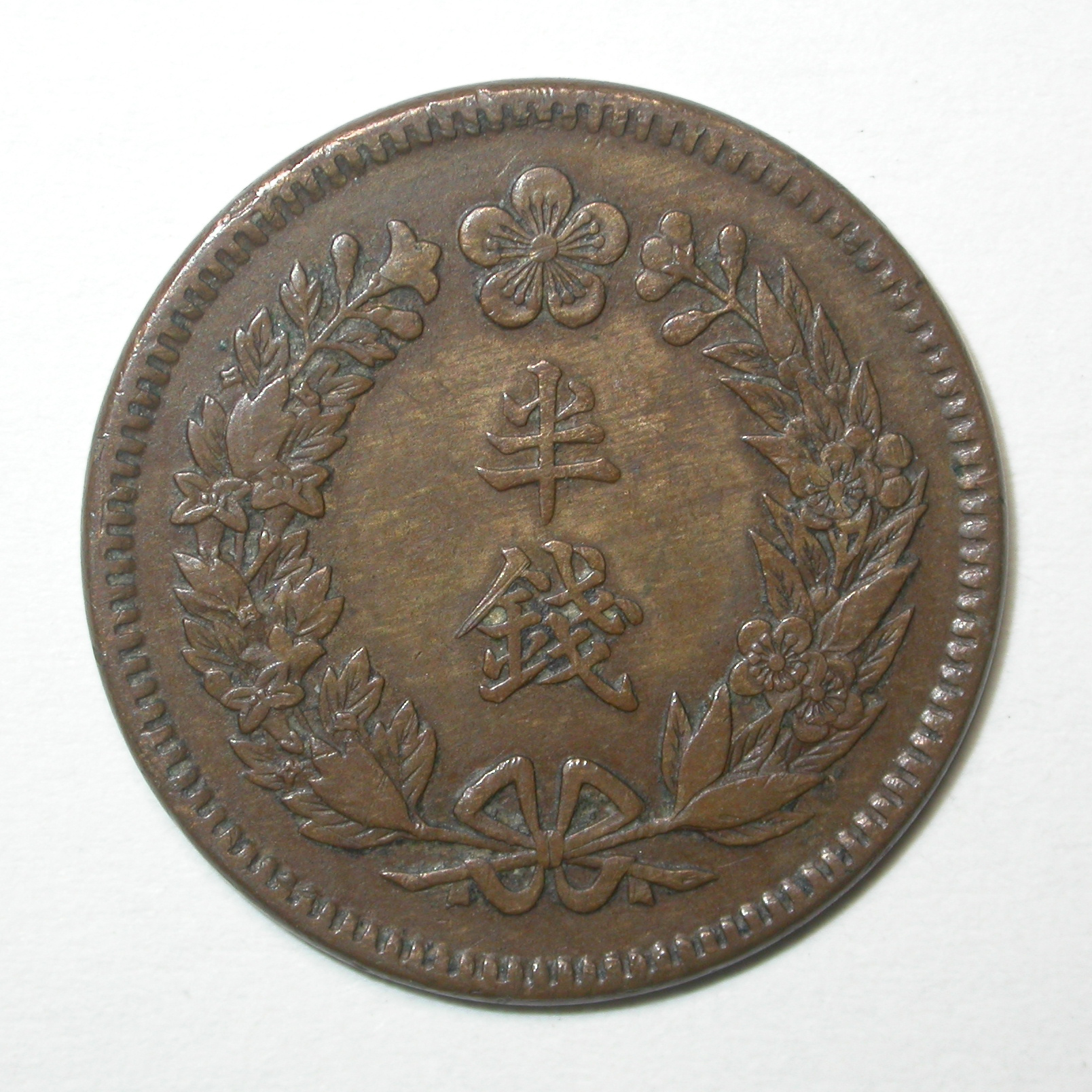
½ jeon coin of the Korean Empire (1909)

== See also ==
- Emblem of North Korea
- Emblem of South Korea
- Imperial crest of Japan
- Imperial emblem of Manchukuo
