= Tianjin Shrine =

- 天津神社
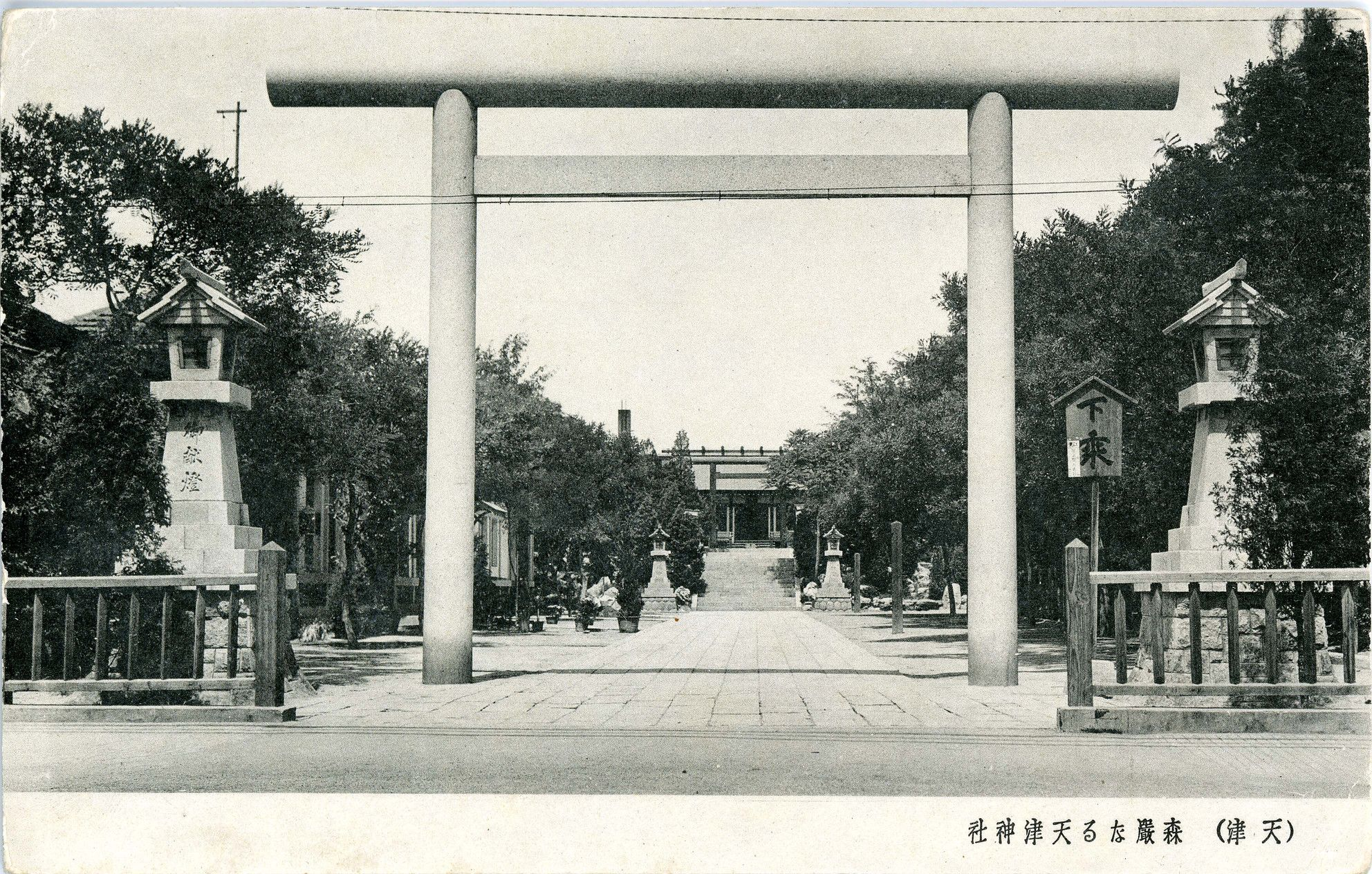

General information
- Architectural style: Shinmei-zukuri
- Location: Yamato Park, Japanese Concession, Tianjin, China
- Completed: 1920
- Demolished: 1945

Tianjin Shrine (天津神社), also known as the Tianjin Japanese Shrine, was a Shinto place of worship located in the modern-era Tianjin Japanese Concession, inside Yamato Park. The shrine was dedicated to Amaterasu-Ōmikami and Emperor Meiji, and its buildings adopted the traditional Japanese Shinmei-zukuri architectural style. It stood at the northwest corner of today's intersection of Anshan Road and Shandong Road. In 1945, following Japan's defeat in the war, Tianjin Shrine—regarded as a symbol of the Japanese invasion of China—was demolished.

== History ==
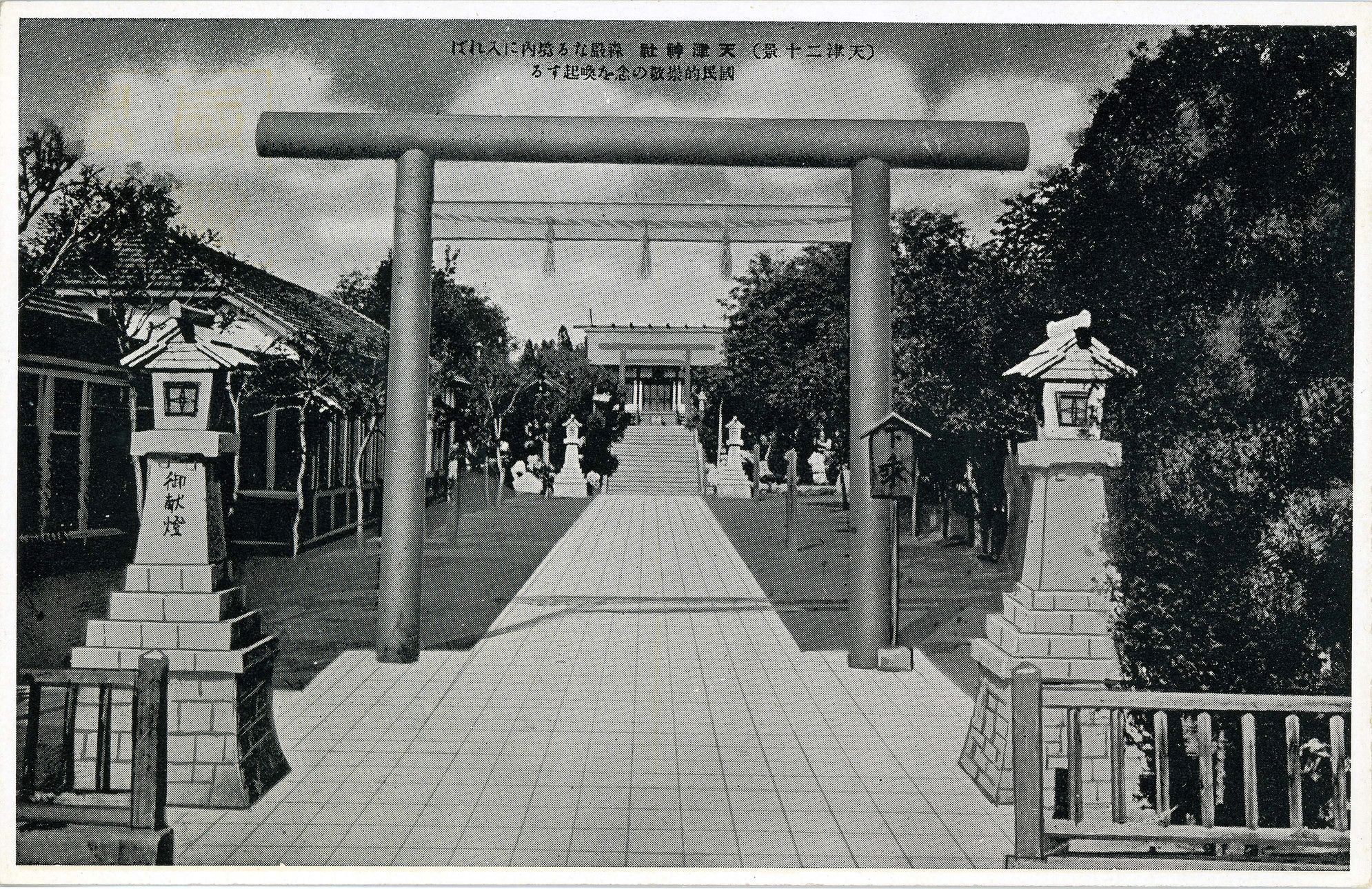
Tianjin Shrine on a postcard

In 1915, the Japanese Residents' Association in Tianjin resolved to establish Tianjin Shrine in Yamato Park of the Japanese Concession to celebrate the enthronement ceremonies of Emperor Taishō. Flooding later caused delays in construction, and the shrine was not completed until 1920.

In 1945, after Japan's defeat, the shrine was dismantled as a symbol of Japanese aggression in China.

On April 27, 2014, according to an on-site investigation by Japanese researchers, no trace of the shrine remains; the original site has since been redeveloped into a PetroChina gas station.

== See also ==
- Japanese concession in Tianjin
- Yamato Park
