= Yamato Park =

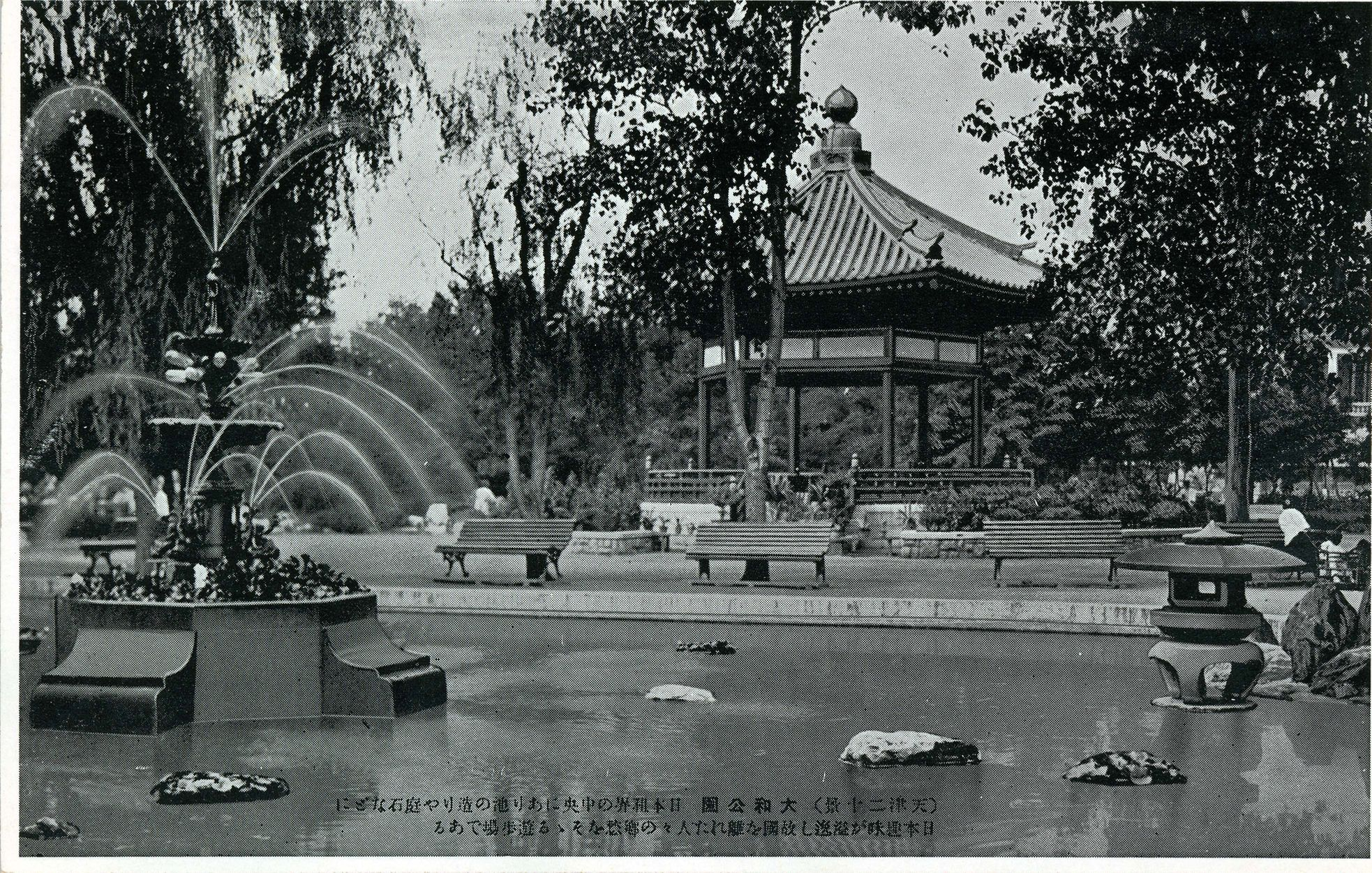
Yamato Park

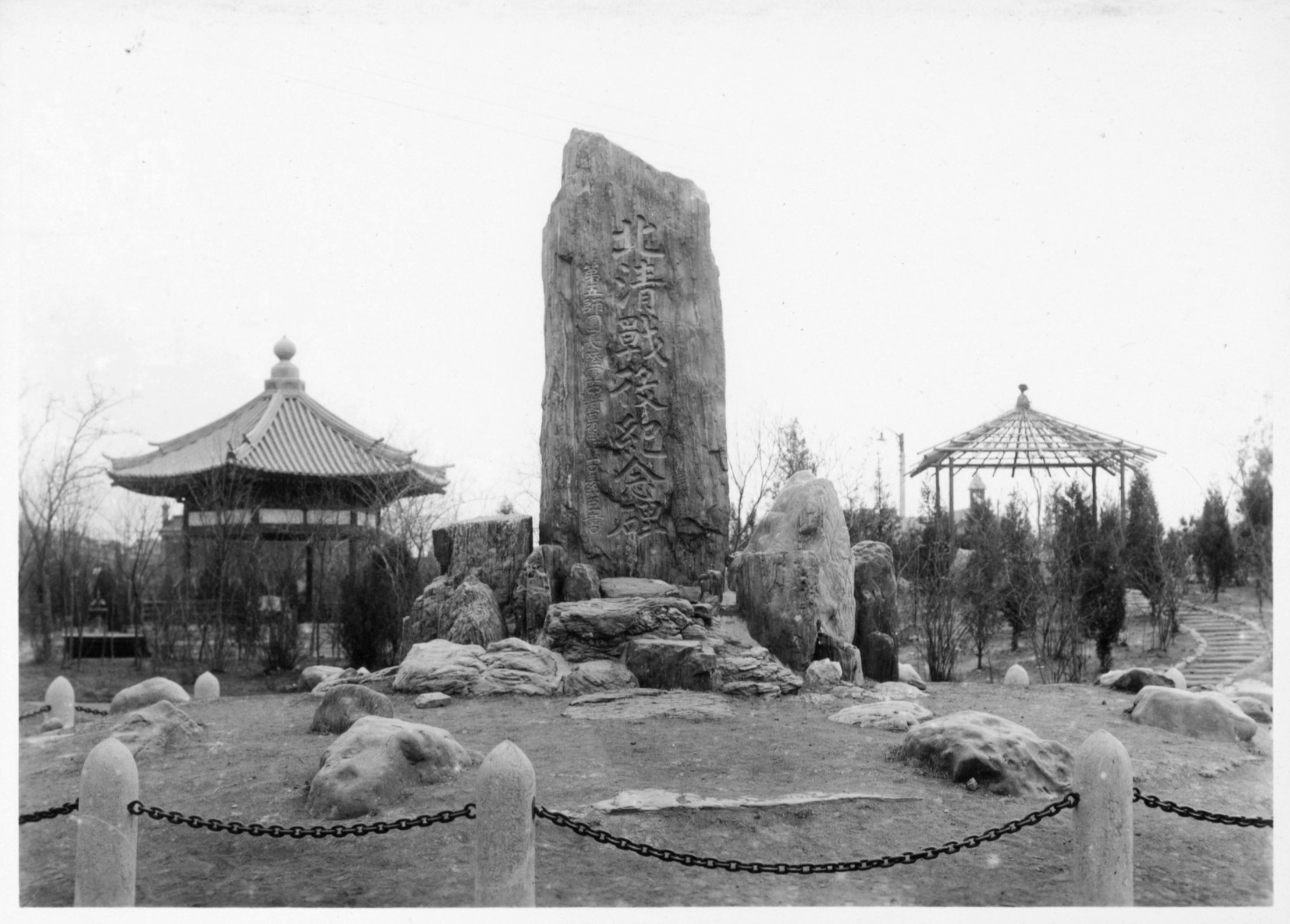
the "Boxer Rebellion Memorial"

Yamato Park (Japanese: 大和公園, Hepburn: Yamato Kōen; pinyin: Dàhé gōngyuán) was a park that once existed within the Japanese concession in Tianjin. It was completed in 1909 and held its opening ceremony that same year. The name "Yamato" is derived from the ancient Japanese province of Yamato, symbolizing Japan's cultural heritage and the identity of the Japanese expatriates in Tianjin. The park featured structures such as the Tianjin Shrine and the "Boxer Rebellion Memorial". Reflecting elements of Japanese domestic culture, it served as a recreational space for the Japanese community in Tianjin, but has also been pointed out by Chinese scholars as a display of colonial imperialism and the power of invaders. In 1945, with Japan's defeat and the return of the Japanese Concession, the Nationalist government decided to transform the park into a Martyrs' Shrine, turning it into a site to commemorate revolutionary martyrs.

== See also ==
- Foreign concessions in Tianjin:Japanese concession in Tianjin
- Tianjin Shrine
