= Geography of Beijing =

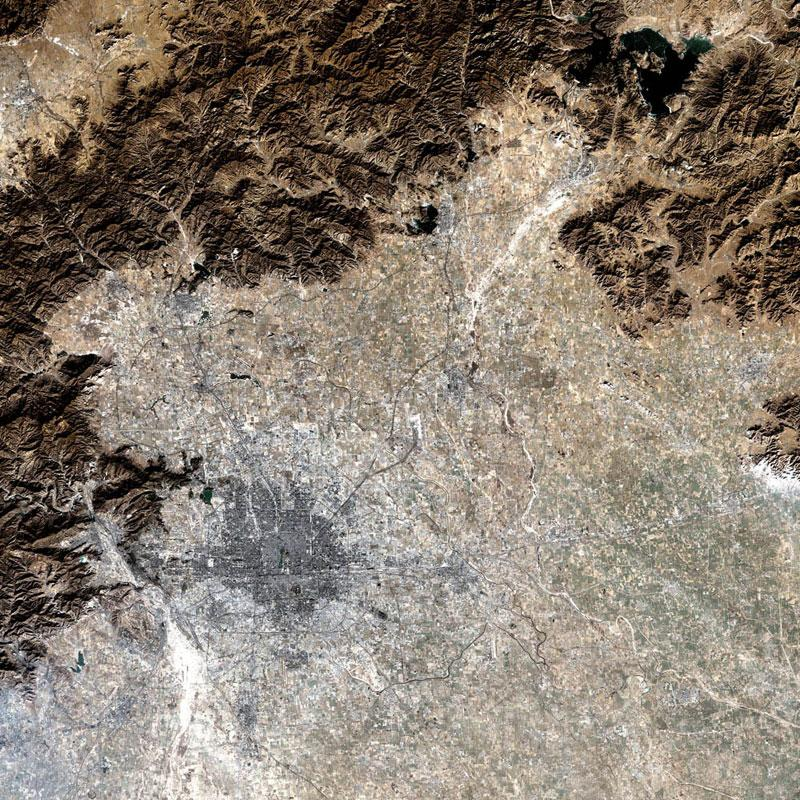
Geography of Beijing
Location of Beijing Municipality in northern China
Satellite image of Beijing Municipality, showing the city of Beijing (in pink) with mountains in the north and west and plains to the east and south
Continent	Asia
Location	North China Plain
Coordinates	39°54′N 116°24′E
Area (municipality)	Total: 16,801 square kilometres (6,487 sq mi)

Beijing is a municipality located in North China at the northern tip of the North China Plain, near the meeting point of the Xishan and Yanshan mountain ranges. The city itself lies on flat land (elevation 20 to 60 metres or 66 to 200 feet) that opens to the east and south. The municipality's outlying districts extend into the mountains that surround the city from the southwest to the northeast. The highest peaks are over 2,000 m (6,600 ft).

Beijing Municipality consists of six city districts (previously eight, see Xuanwu and Chongwen), and ten suburban districts, four of which were formerly counties. It covers a total area of 16,807.8 km^{2} (6,489.5 sq mi). By land area, the municipality is slightly smaller than the country of Kuwait, though much of the municipality outside the urban core is sparsely populated mountains and farmland. The terrain is roughly 38% flat and 62% mountainous. The city is 150 km (93 mi) inland from the Bohai Sea via Tianjin Municipality in the southeast. Aside from Tianjin, Beijing is bordered on all other sides by Hebei Province, including a piece wedged between Beijing and Tianjin.

Historically, Beijing was situated on the border between sedentary agricultural areas to the south and pastoralist regions beyond the mountains to the north. The Great Wall of China was built across the mountains north of Beijing to guard against nomadic invasions. In modern times, the same mountains that shielded Beijing from the Gobi steppes also form a semi-circular basin which catches the city's air pollution. Severe smog problems develop in the summer as the hot and humid air pressure from monsoons in the south prevent air pollutants from leaving the basin. Smog is less severe in the fall and winter when the direction of the wind currents reverse course as the vast anticyclone high pressure system takes hold and brings cold, dry air from Siberia. In the spring, the northerly winds, pick up dust from desertifying areas of western China and bring occasionally severe dust storms to Beijing. The city's climate is characterized by hot, humid summers and cold, windy, and dry winters.

== Layout of Beijing's administrative divisions ==
In imperial times, the old walled city of Beijing occupied 62 km^{2} (24 sq mi). The physical size of the city has grown more than tenfold in recent decades to about 750 km^{2} (290 sq mi). The inner suburbs (1,282 km^{2} or 495 sq mi), and outer suburbs (3,198 km^{2} or 1,235 sq mi) provide further space for growth. The remaining 12,239.9 km^{2} (4,725.9 sq mi) of the municipality consists of rural areas, nature reserves and lightly populated mountains.

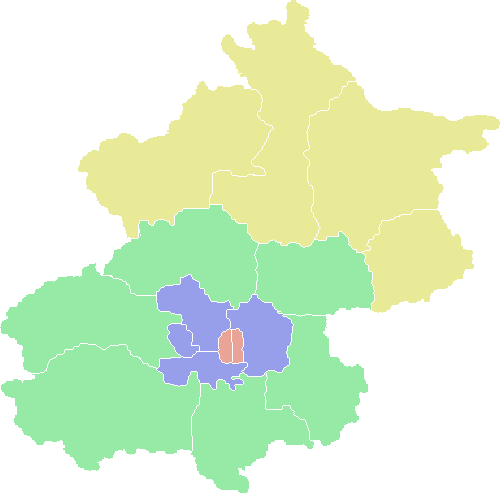
Map showing the core city (red), surrounding urban areas (blue), interior suburban areas (green) and the far north (dark yellow)

Two urban districts, Dongcheng and Xicheng form the urban core of Beijing. They occupy the area inside the old walled city, which used to be divided into two walled sections, neicheng, the inner city and waicheng, the adjoining outer city to the south. Though the city walls no longer stand, they continue to retain geographic significance. Streets that once traversed the wall are still named nei (inner) or wai (outer) in relationship to whether the street section is inside or outside the wall. Today, Line 2 loop of the Beijing Subway traces the inner city wall. The 2nd Ring Road outlines the combined walled city and the outer city.

The inner city is divided into eastern and western halves by Dongcheng and Xicheng Districts. The Forbidden City, where emperors once lived, and Tiananmen Square, the center of the city, both belong to Dongcheng. However, the Zhongnanhai Compound, next door to the Forbidden City, where China's current leaders now reside, and the Great Hall of the People, on the west side of Tiananmen Square, are both part of Xicheng. The outer city, adjacent and south of the inner city, comprises the former Xuanwu and Chongwen districts, merged with Xicheng and Dongcheng respectively in July 2010. Chongwen is home to the Temple of Heaven. Xuanwu is oldest continuously inhabited part of Beijing. Some of its neighborhoods including those around the Niujie Mosque (b. 996 A.D.) and Pagoda of Tianning Temple (b. 1119 A.D.) predate the Yuan capital. Unlike in most other parts of the city, most narrow lanes in Xuanwu are called jie instead of hutongs. Each of the two core city districts has population density of over 20,000 inhabitants per square kilometre or 52,000 inhabitants per square mile.

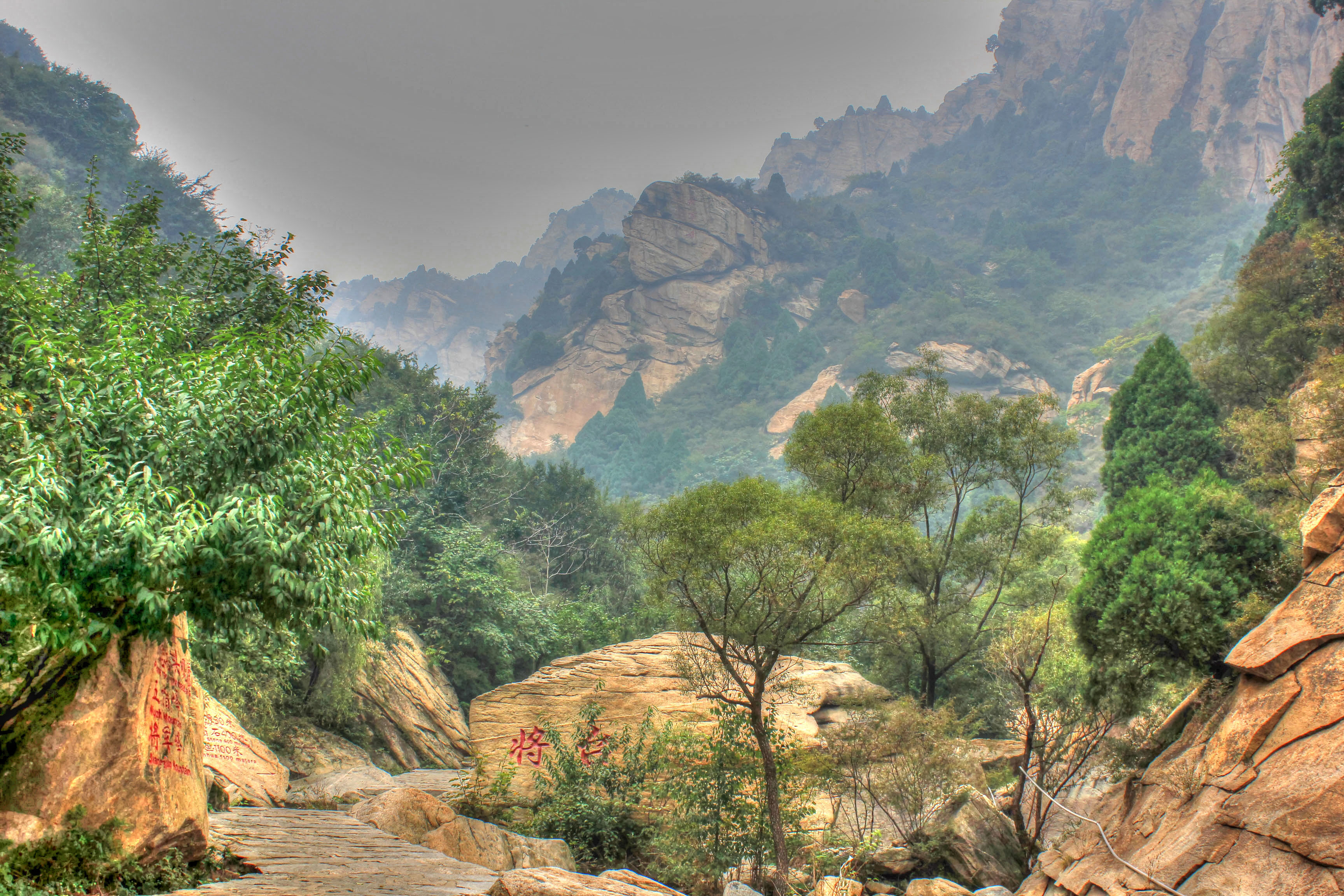
The Jundu Mountains in Miyun County

Beyond the 2nd Ring Road, the city spreads out in a checkerboard fashion marked by concentric ring roads. Four other districts, Haidian, Chaoyang, Fengtai and Shijingshan, were once considered on the city's outskirts, but are now integral parts of the city inside the 5th Ring Road. All four have population densities above 4,500 inhabitants per square kilometre or 11,700 inhabitants per square mile. The vast Haidian District to the northwest is home to the Old and New Summer Palace, the university district, and Zhongguancun, the city's high-technology silicon village. The even bigger Chaoyang District embraces the city from the north and east. Its highlights include Beijing Central Business District (CBD), the Olympic Green, and even the Beijing Capital International Airport. (Note: The Beijing Capital Airport and the highway connecting it to the city are administered by Chaoyang District even though the airport is almost completely surrounded by Shunyi District.) Shijingshan is a heavily industrialized district in the foothills of the Western Hills. Fengtai spans across the south of urban Beijing.

Of the suburban districts further afield, Tongzhou and Shunyi in the east are rapidly urbanizing. Mentougou and Fangshan lie to the west, in Xishan, also known as the Western Hills. Fangshan is home to two of the oldest prehistoric sites in Beijing Municipality: the caves at Zhoukoudian, home of the Peking Man, and Liulihe, the site of the capital of the Yan Kingdom during the Western Zhou dynasty. Daxing District, to the south, is largely agricultural but is also developing its own technology park in Yizhuang. Changping just north of the city ranges from densely urbanized Tiantongyuan in the south to the Juyongguan Great Wall in the north. In between are the Thirteen Ming Tombs.

In the Yanshan range covering the far north of the municipality are Yanqing, Miyun, Huairou and Pinggu Districts, all of which were rural counties until 2001. The far north is rugged, rural and sparsely populated. Yanqing, Huairou and Miyun districts all have fewer than 200 inhabitants per square kilometre or 518 inhabitants per square mile. They are perhaps best known for stretches of the Great Wall, with Badaling and Shuiguan in Yanqing, Mutianyu, Huanghuacheng and Jiankou in Huairou, and Gubeikou and Simatai in Miyun, and Jiangjunguan in Pinggu.

== Topography ==
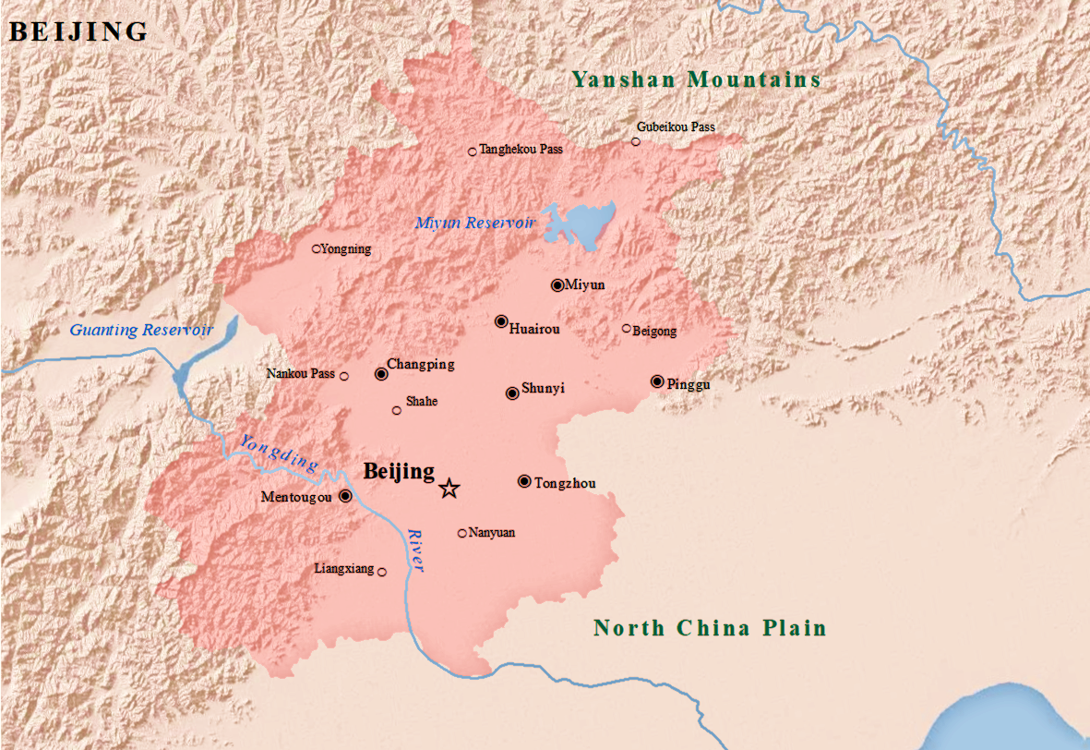
Topography of Beijing

The city of Beijing lies on low and flat land, with elevation generally between 40–60 metres (130–200 ft) above sea level. The highest point inside the old walled city is at the top of Coal Hill in Jingshan Park, which rises to 88.35 metres (289.9 ft) and overlooks the Forbidden City. Longevity Hill in the Summer Palace reaches an elevation of 109 metres (358 ft). The plains from Beijing extend to the east as far as Shanhaiguan on the Bohai Sea and as far south as Nanjing, on the Yangtze River.

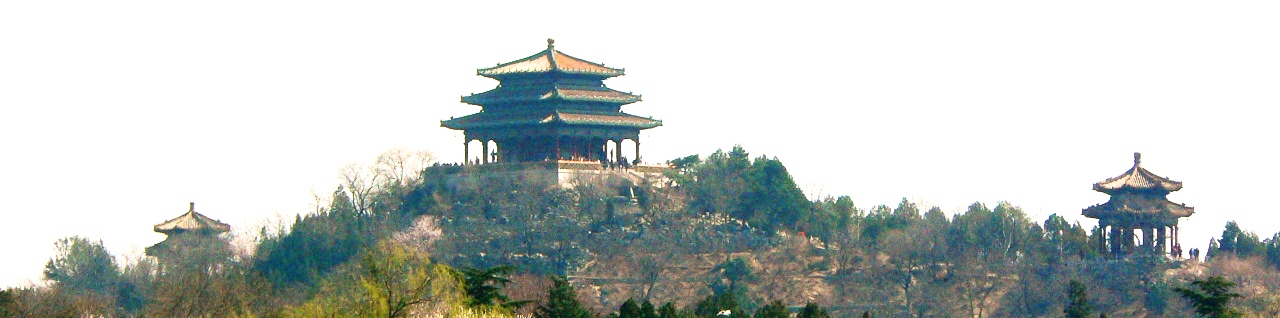
Jingshan, the highest point in the old walled city of Beijing

To the west is Xishan, also known as the Western Hills, which are visible from the city on clear days. Xishan forms the eastern flank of the Taihang Mountains range, which run north–south up the spine of Hebei province. Xishan covers nearly all of Fangshan and Mentougou Districts west of the city. East Lingshan (elevation 2,303 metres or 7,556 feet), a Xishan peak on the border with Hebei, is the highest point in Beijing Municipality, though located 122 km (76 mi) from the city centre. Xishan is also known for high mountain meadows and scenic river gorges, including Shidu. Foothills of Xishan reach the city itself. They include Fragrant Hills, a major tourist attraction and Laoshan, the site of mountain bike competition in the 2008 Summer Olympics.

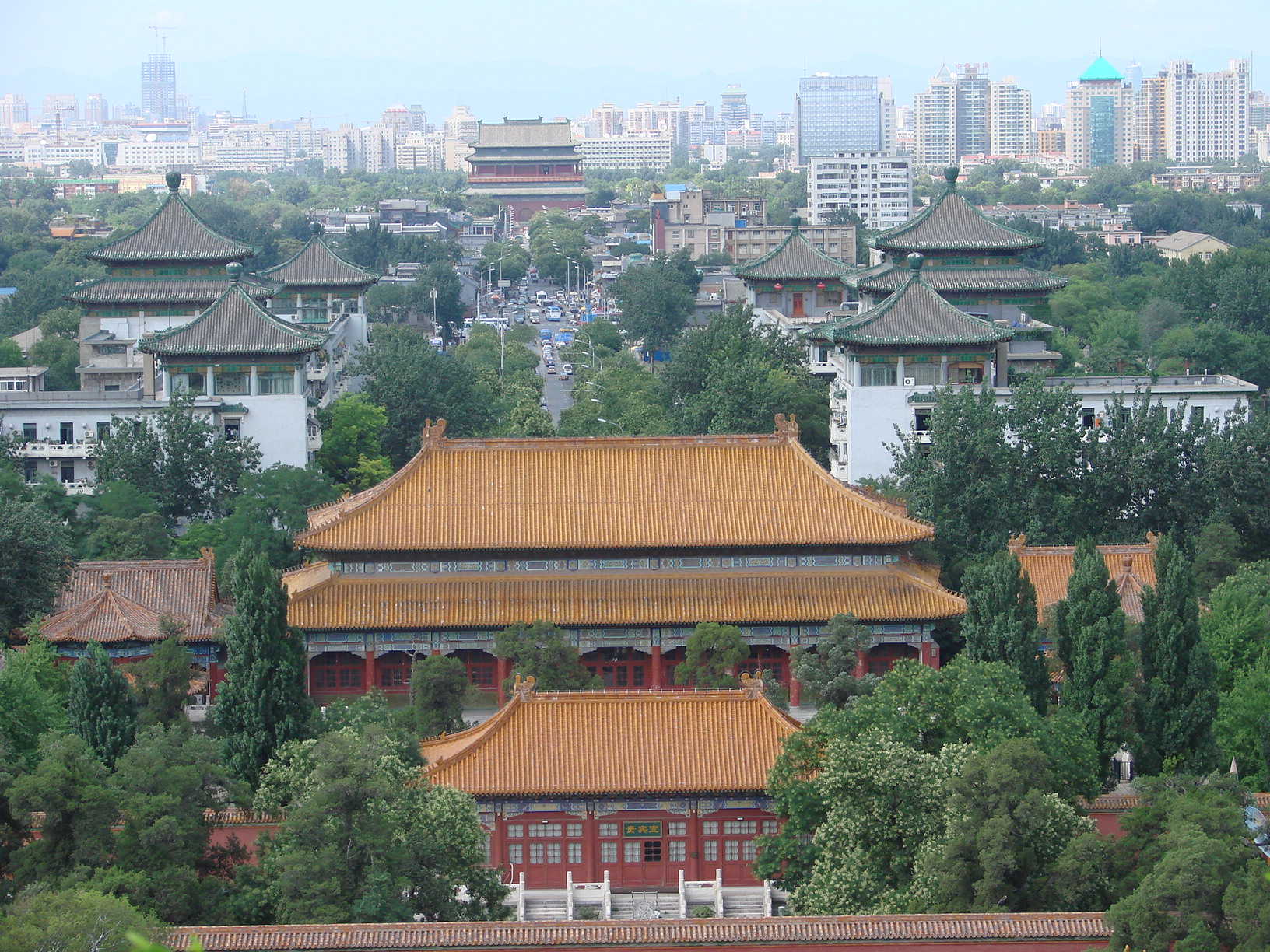
Looking north from atop Jingshan Hill along Di'anmen Avenue to the Drum Tower of Beijing. Di'anmen Avenue runs along Beijing's median axis. Dongcheng District is to the right and Xicheng is to the left. The Yanshan range north of the city is faintly visible in the distance.

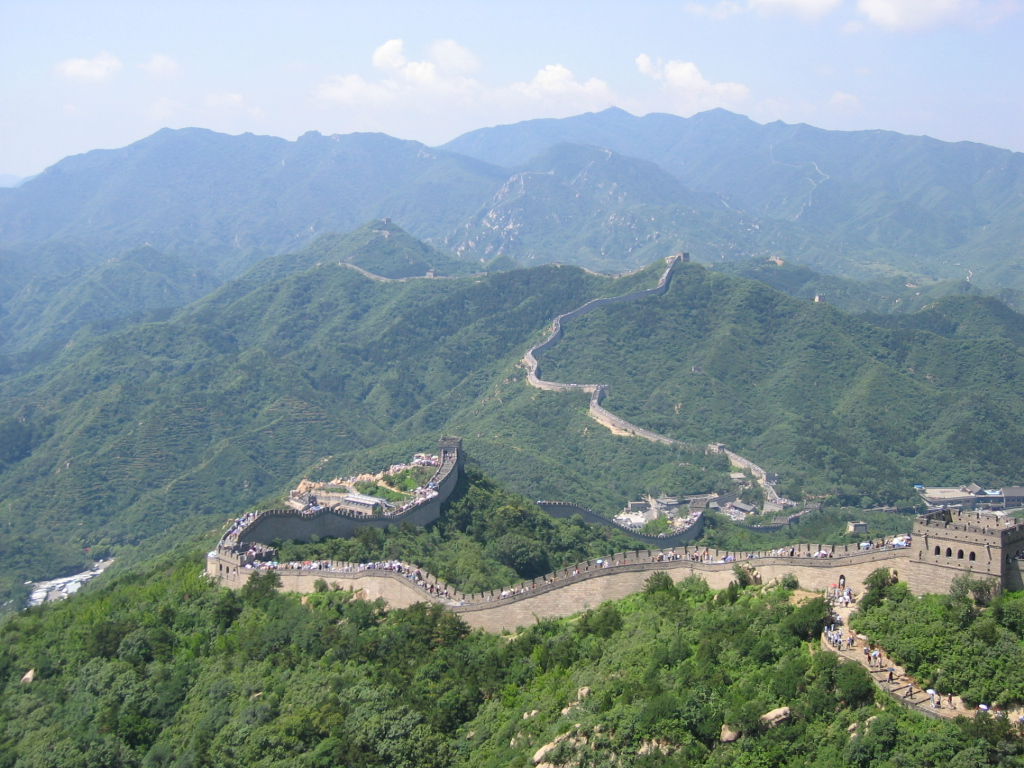
Badaling Great Wall in the Yanshan range

The mountains north of Beijing including Badaling, Jundu Mountains and Fenghuanling all belong to the Yanshan range, which runs east–west, across northern Hebei Province. Yanshan separates the North China Plain from the steppes and held considerable military significance in history. All of Beijing's Great Wall sections were built in the Yanshan range, which reaches a height of 2,241 m (7,352 ft) at Haituoshan on the border between Yanqing County and Hebei.

The Yanshan and Xishan ranges meet at Nankou, in Changping District, northwest of the city. The intersection creates a massive fault line and rift valley through which the city's main roads and railroads to the northwest pass.

== Hydrology ==
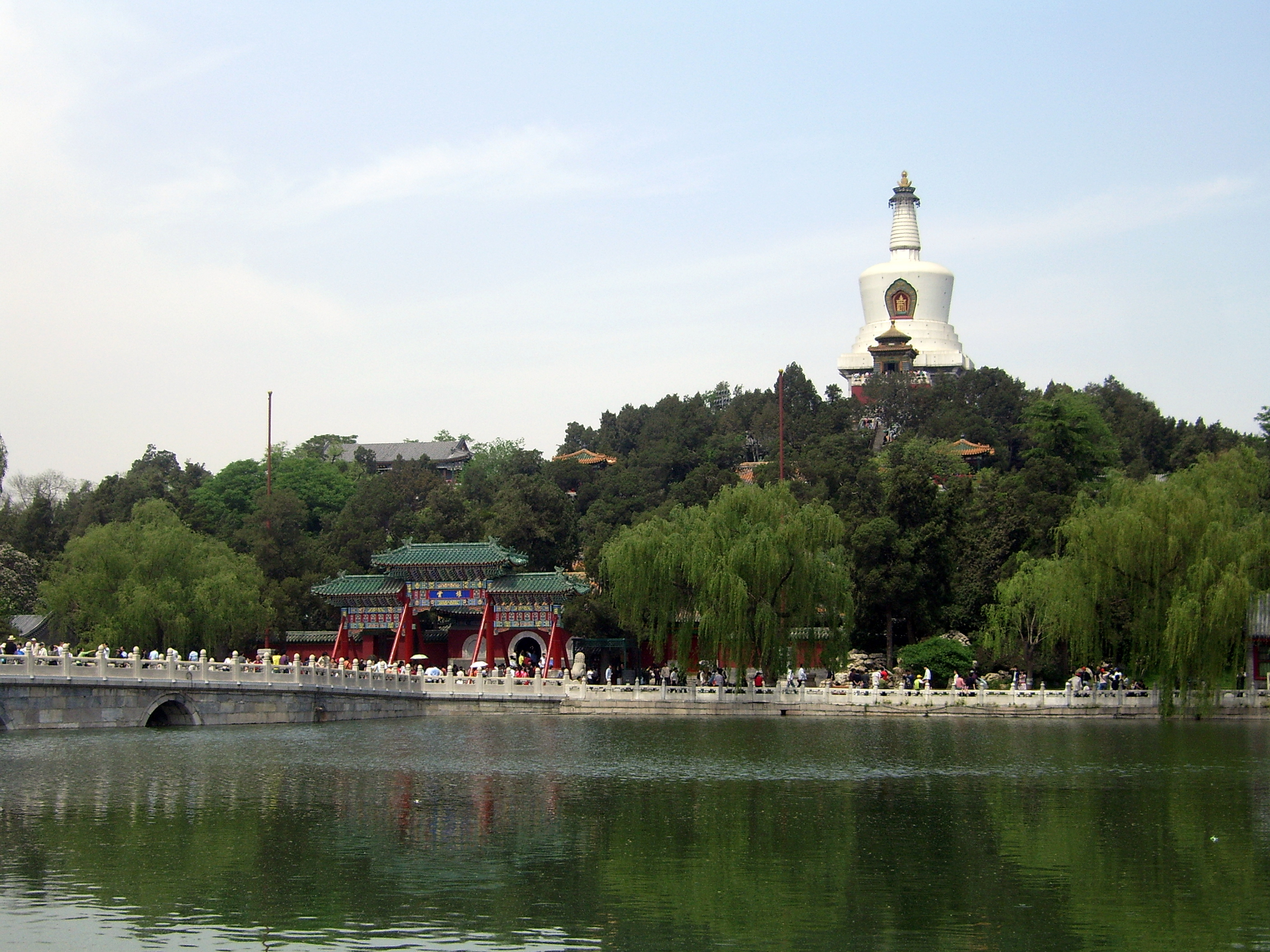
Beihai lake and Qiongdao Island in downtown Beijing

Several major rivers, including the Yongding, Chaobai, Juma and Wenyu flow through Beijing Municipality. They originate in the highlands of Hebei and Shanxi, cut through the mountains west and north of the city, and eventually flow into the Hai River, which empties into the Bohai Sea. Over the centuries, hydrologists have channeled rivers through the city into man-made lakes, moats, channels and aqueducts, which provide water to the city and drain its refuse, but no longer threaten Beijing with flooding.

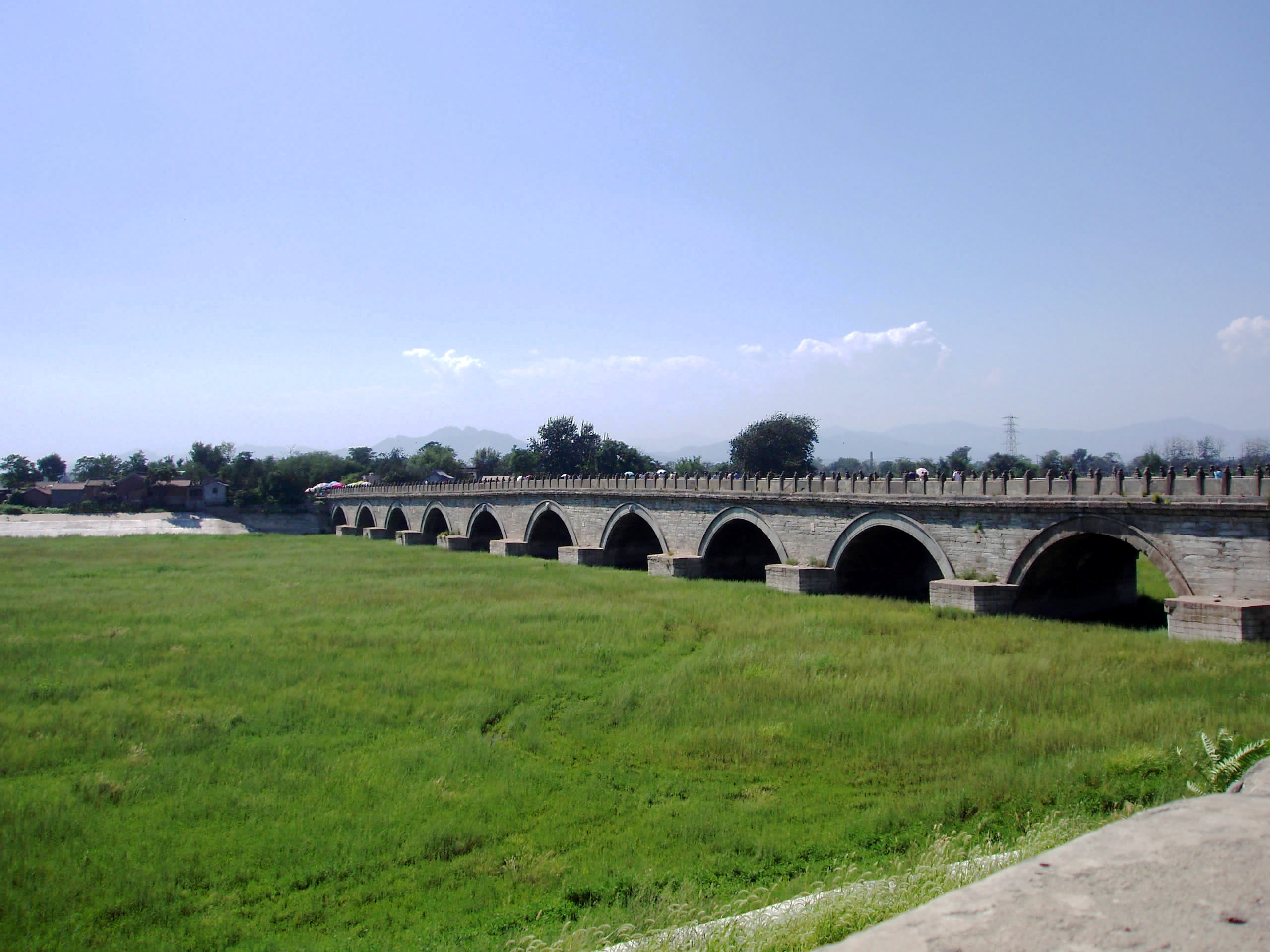
Marco Polo Bridge across the Yongding River

Downtown Beijing has several lakes called hai or sea. During the Yuan dynasty, the Mongol rulers expanded them and built imperial palace of Dadu around them. Subsequent emperors of the Ming and Qing dynasties used the lakes as imperial gardens. Today, the three northernmost lakes, Xihai (West Sea), Houhai (Rear Sea) and Qianhai (Front Sea), collectively known as Shichahai, are lined with bars and cafés and known for nightlife. To their south, Beihai (North Sea) is a city park, and Zhonghai (Central Sea) and Nanhai (South Sea) are part of the Zhongnanhai Compound, residence to China's leaders. This string of lakes used to form the main riverbed of the Yongding River, which now flows 50–60 km (31–37 mi) to the west. 1,800 years ago, the Yongding flowed through Jishuitan and downtown Beijing and then into Longtan Lake and on to Tongzhou. However, a major flood in 295 A.D. devastated part of Beijing, then known as Ji. Just west of Wangfujing, there is still a stretch of Beijing called Shatan or Sandy Beach.

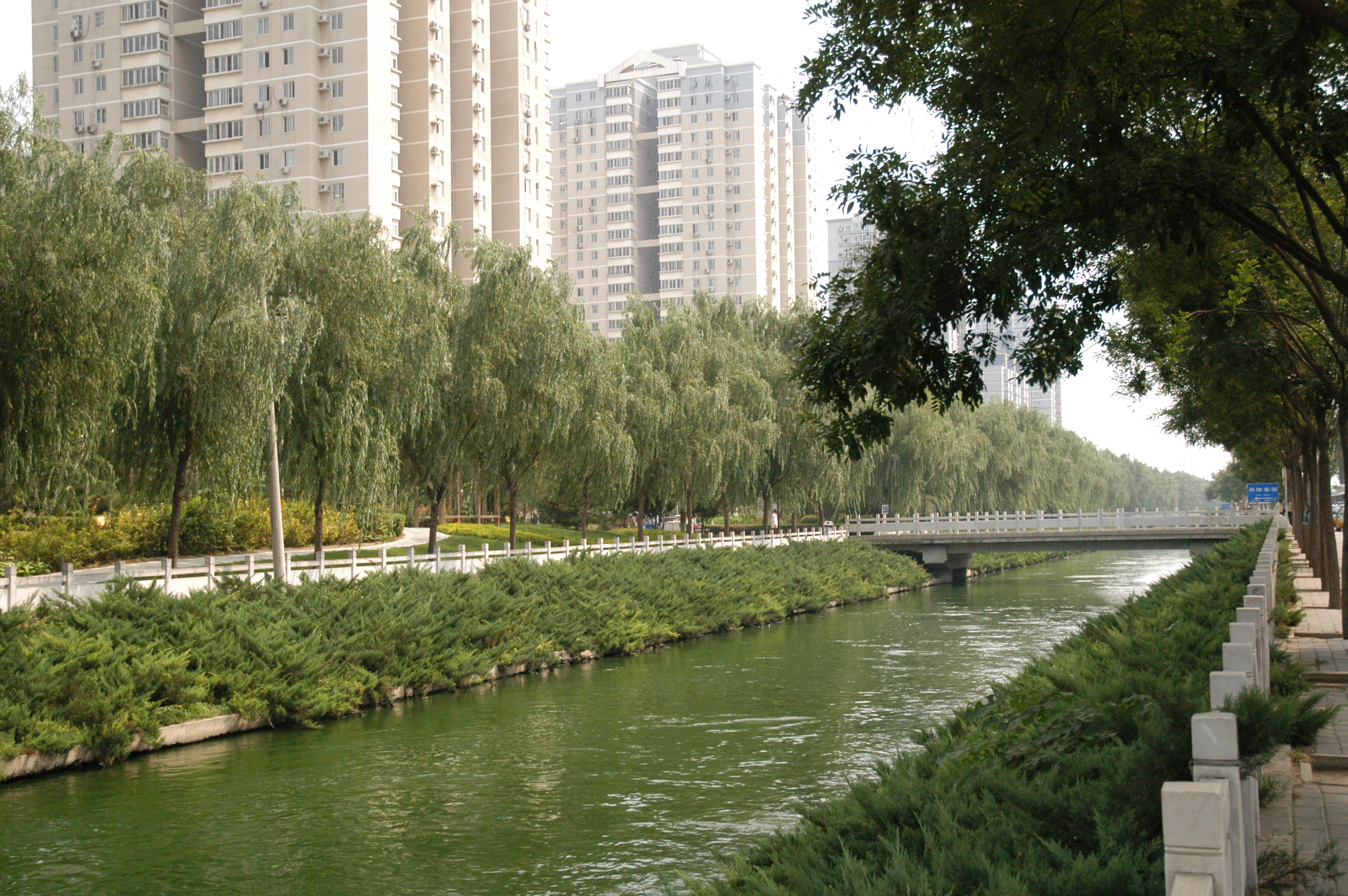
The Tonghui canal, an extension of the Grand Canal, near Gaobeidian

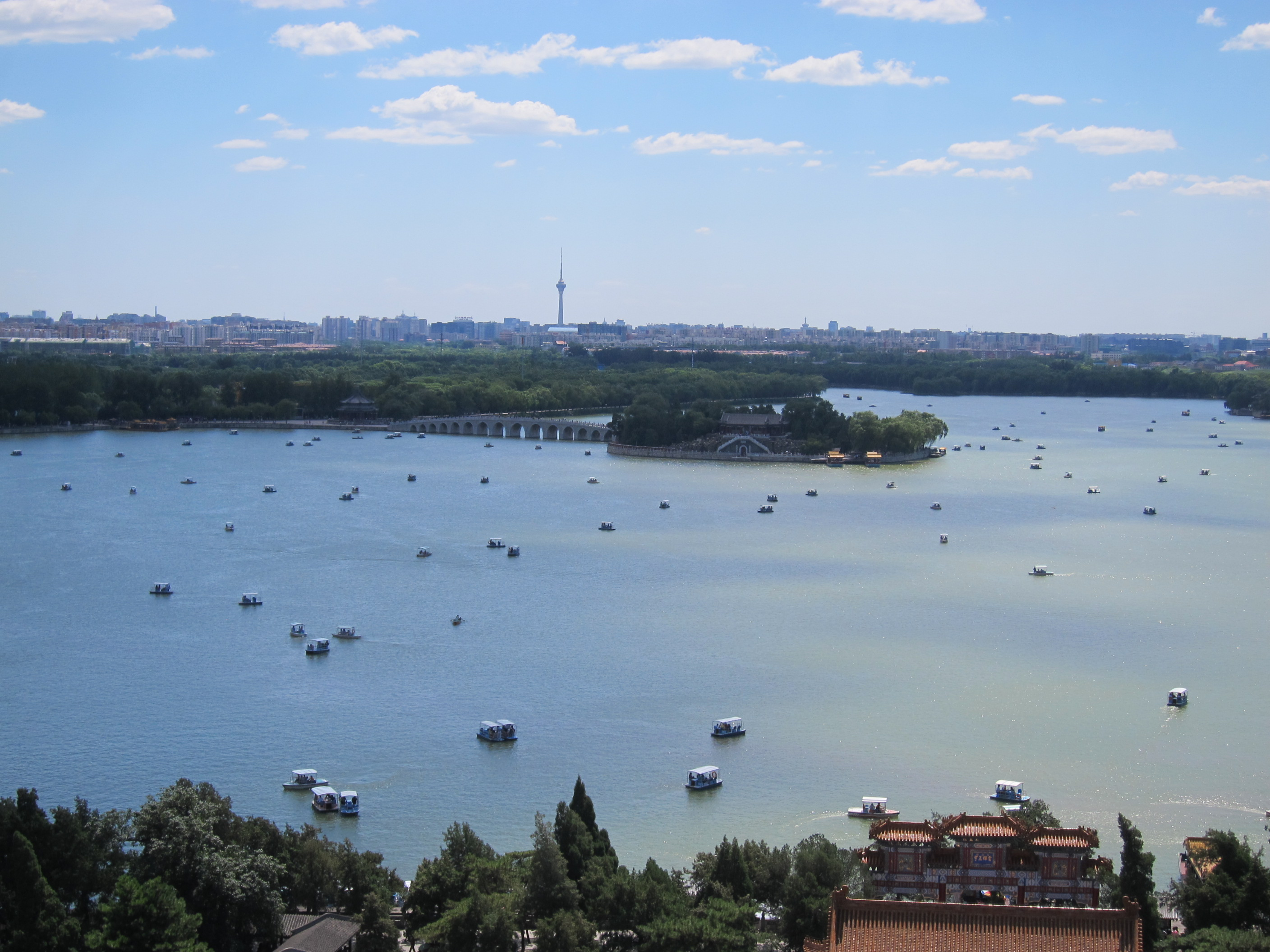
Kunming Lake in the Summer Palace

Today, an aqueduct draws water from the Yongding through Yuyuantan Park to the western city moat, which empties into Liangshui River south of the city. Another aqueduct draws water from Kunming Lake in the Summer Palace down through the Purple Bamboo Park and into the northern city moat, which also replenishes Shichahai, Beihai and Zhongnanhai. The northern moats are drained by the Ba River, which flows into the Wenyu River. The southern and eastern moats are drained by the Tonghui River, which also flow into the Wenyu.

This network of rivers and aqueducts are fed by reservoirs to the north of the city. The Miyun Reservoir, the largest in the municipality, is created at the confluence of the Chao and Bai Rivers, which forms the Chaobai. The Yongding, before entering the municipality in Mentougou District, is dammed to create the vast Guanting Reservoir of Hebei Province. Despite these reservoirs, the city of Beijing faces chronic water shortages due to water-intensive agriculture, industry, and population growth. Under the South-North Water Transfer Project, the city plans to draw water from the Yangtze River through the Grand Canal, which was built 800 years ago for transportation, but now is being upgraded into a major aqueduct.

== Climate ==
Beijing

Climate chart (precipitation, max. and min. temperature)
J	F	M	A	M	J	J	A	S	O	N	D
2.2 2 −7	5.8 3 −4	8.6 13 2	22 21 9	36 27 15	72 31 20	170 32 23	113 31 22	54 27 16	29 19 9	14 10 1	2.2 4 −5
- █ Average max. and min. temperatures in °C
- █ Precipitation totals in mm
- Source: CMA
Imperial conversion
J	F	M	A	M	J	J	A	S	O	N	D
0.1 36 20	0.2 38 26	0.3 56 35	0.9 70 48	1.4 81 59	2.9 87 68	6.7 89 73	4.5 87 72	2.1 80 61	1.1 67 48	0.5 51 33	0.1 39 23
- █ Average max. and min. temperatures in °F
- █ Precipitation totals in inches

The city has a rather dry monsoon-influenced humid continental climate (Köppen: Dwa), bordering on a cool semi-arid climate (BSk); characterised by hot, humid summers due to the East Asian monsoon, and generally cold, windy, very dry winters that reflect the influence of the vast Siberian anticyclone. Yet during the winter, winds from the northwest must cross the mountains that shield the city, keeping the city warmer than other locations of similar latitude in China. Spring can bear witness to sandstorms blowing in from the Mongolian steppe, accompanied by rapidly warming, but generally dry, conditions. Autumn, like spring, sees little rain but is crisp and short. January averages −2.7 °C (27.1 °F), while July averages 27.2 °C (81.0 °F). Annual precipitation is around 570 millimetres (22.4 in), falling mostly in July and August. Extremes have ranged from −27.4 to 41.9 °C (−17 to 107 °F).

Climate data for Beijing, elevation 31 m (102 ft), (1991–2020 normals, extremes 1951–present)
Month	Jan	Feb	Mar	Apr	May	Jun	Jul	Aug	Sep	Oct	Nov	Dec	Year
Record high °C (°F)	14.3 (57.7)	25.6 (78.1)	29.5 (85.1)	33.5 (92.3)	41.1 (106.0)	41.1 (106.0)	41.9 (107.4)	38.3 (100.9)	35.9 (96.6)	31.0 (87.8)	23.3 (73.9)	19.5 (67.1)	41.9 (107.4)
Mean daily maximum °C (°F)	2.3 (36.1)	6.1 (43.0)	13.2 (55.8)	21.0 (69.8)	27.2 (81.0)	30.8 (87.4)	31.8 (89.2)	30.7 (87.3)	26.5 (79.7)	19.3 (66.7)	10.3 (50.5)	3.7 (38.7)	18.6 (65.4)
Daily mean °C (°F)	−2.7 (27.1)	0.6 (33.1)	7.5 (45.5)	15.1 (59.2)	21.3 (70.3)	25.3 (77.5)	27.2 (81.0)	26.1 (79.0)	21.2 (70.2)	13.8 (56.8)	5.2 (41.4)	−1.0 (30.2)	13.3 (55.9)
Mean daily minimum °C (°F)	−6.9 (19.6)	−4.2 (24.4)	1.9 (35.4)	9.0 (48.2)	15.1 (59.2)	20.0 (68.0)	23.0 (73.4)	22.0 (71.6)	16.3 (61.3)	8.8 (47.8)	0.7 (33.3)	−5.0 (23.0)	8.4 (47.1)
Record low °C (°F)	−22.8 (−9.0)	−27.4 (−17.3)	−15 (5)	−3.2 (26.2)	2.5 (36.5)	9.8 (49.6)	15.3 (59.5)	11.4 (52.5)	3.7 (38.7)	−3.5 (25.7)	−12.3 (9.9)	−18.3 (−0.9)	−27.4 (−17.3)
Average precipitation mm (inches)	2.2 (0.09)	5.8 (0.23)	8.6 (0.34)	21.7 (0.85)	36.1 (1.42)	72.4 (2.85)	169.7 (6.68)	113.4 (4.46)	53.7 (2.11)	28.7 (1.13)	13.5 (0.53)	2.2 (0.09)	528 (20.78)
Average precipitation days (≥ 0.1 mm)	1.6	2.3	3.0	4.7	6.0	10.0	11.9	10.5	7.1	5.2	2.9	1.6	66.8
Average snowy days	2.8	2.5	1.3	0.1	0.0	0.0	0.0	0.0	0.0	0.0	1.7	2.8	11.2
Average relative humidity (%)	43	42	40	43	47	58	69	71	64	58	54	46	53
Mean monthly sunshine hours	188.1	189.1	231.1	243.2	265.1	221.6	190.5	205.3	206.1	199.9	173.4	177.1	2,490.5
Percentage possible sunshine	62	62	62	61	59	50	42	49	56	59	59	61	57
Average ultraviolet index	2	3	4	6	8	9	9	8	6	4	2	1	5
Source 1: China Meteorological Administration
Source 2: Extremes (Note: All-time record high; February record high; May record high; June record high) and Weather Atlas

==== Note ====
Climate data for Beijing Capital International Airport (2013–2024 normals)
Month	Jan	Feb	Mar	Apr	May	Jun	Jul	Aug	Sep	Oct	Nov	Dec	Year
Mean daily maximum °C (°F)	3.2 (37.8)	6.4 (43.5)	15.1 (59.2)	22.0 (71.6)	27.9 (82.2)	31.8 (89.2)	32.4 (90.3)	31.5 (88.7)	27.4 (81.3)	19.6 (67.3)	11.1 (52.0)	4.5 (40.1)	19.4 (66.9)
Daily mean °C (°F)	−3.2 (26.2)	−0.1 (31.8)	8.2 (46.8)	15.2 (59.4)	21.1 (70.0)	25.5 (77.9)	27.2 (81.0)	26.2 (79.2)	21.6 (70.9)	12.8 (55.0)	4.8 (40.6)	−2.1 (28.2)	13.1 (55.6)
Mean daily minimum °C (°F)	−8.8 (16.2)	−6.4 (20.5)	1.1 (34.0)	7.3 (45.1)	13.1 (55.6)	18.5 (65.3)	22.1 (71.8)	21.0 (69.8)	15.5 (59.9)	7.0 (44.6)	−0.3 (31.5)	−7.5 (18.5)	6.9 (44.4)
Average relative humidity (%)	45	44	41	44	47	56	72	73	69	65	57	46	55

== Statistics ==
=== Location ===
Map of the earth centered at Beijing

With coordinates of 39° 54' 50 N and 116° 23' 30" E, Beijing shares roughly the same latitude as Denver, Indianapolis, Columbus (Ohio), Philadelphia, Ankara, Bukhara, as well as Jiayuguan, Yumen, and Jiuquan in Gansu. The city lines up at about the same longitude as Xilinhot, Inner Mongolia; Dezhou, Shandong; Yongcheng, Henan; Lu'an, Anhui; Linchuan, Jiangxi; Changting, Fujian; Jieyang, Guangdong; Kota Kinabalu, Malaysia; and Mataram, Indonesia. The latitude of the municipality ranges from 39° 27' to 41° 03' N and in longitude from 115° 25' to 117° 30' E.

Beijing's antipode is located in the eastern part of Río Negro Province, Argentina, inland from Viedma.

=== Area ===
Direct-administered municipality:

- Total: 16,807.8 square kilometres (6,489.5 sq mi)
- Land: 16,807.8 square kilometres (6,489.5 sq mi)
- Water: negligible

==== Area comparative ====
- Australia comparative: approximately 1/4 the size of Tasmania
- Canada comparative: approximately three times the size of Prince Edward Island
- United States comparative: approximately 1/7 larger than Connecticut
- United Kingdom comparative: approximately 1/7 larger than Northern Ireland
- EU comparative: slightly more than 1/2 the size of Belgium

== Maps and satellite images ==
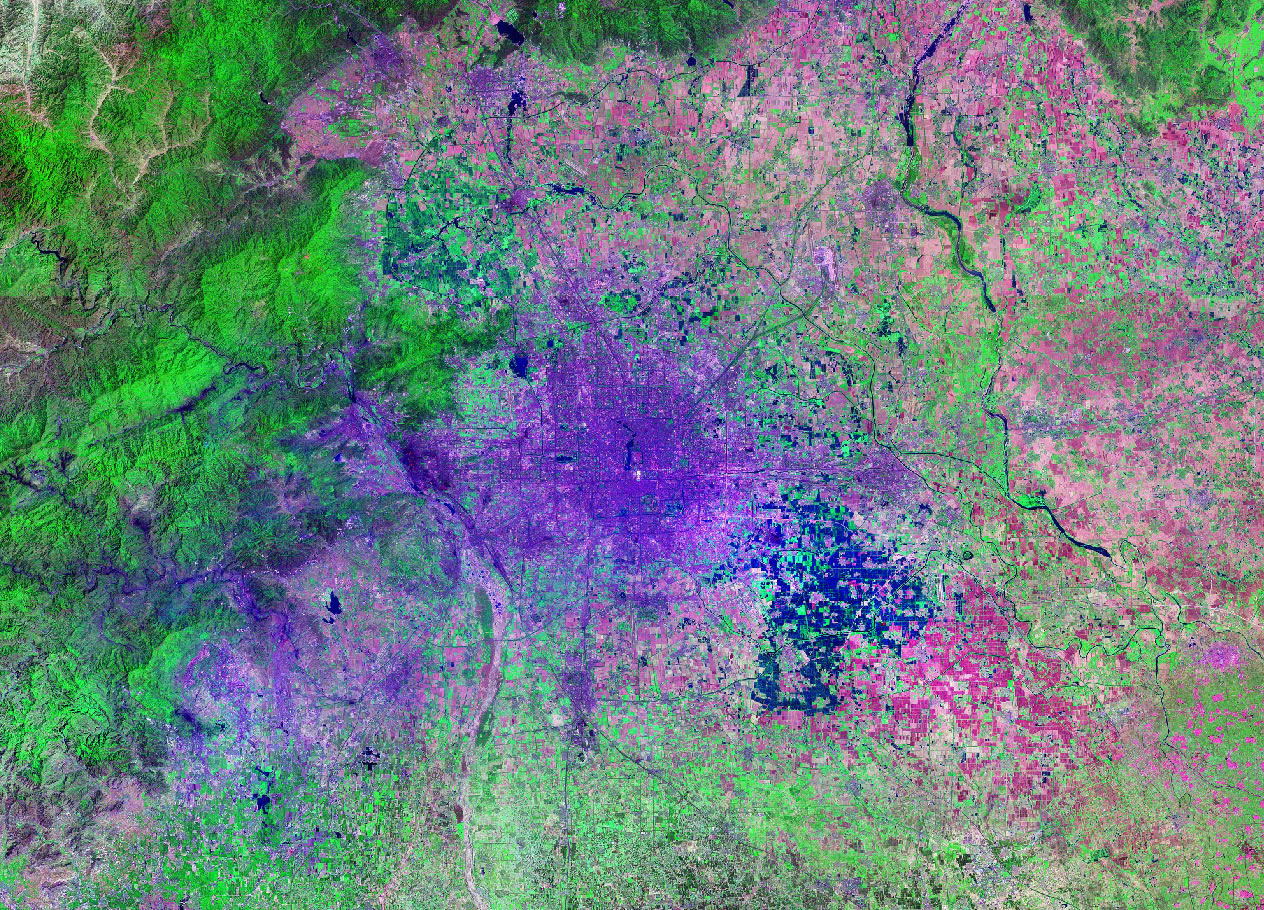
Beijing's urban extent

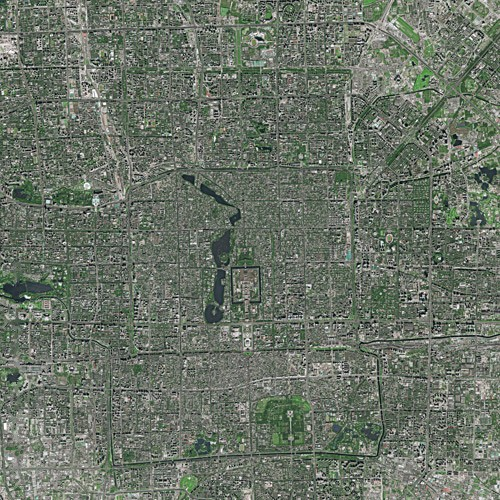
Satellite image of the city of Beijing, with the Forbidden City in the center, just north of Tiananmen Square and east of a string of lakes. Also visible are Yuyuantan lake in the west and the southern city moat, which once surrounded the walled outer city.

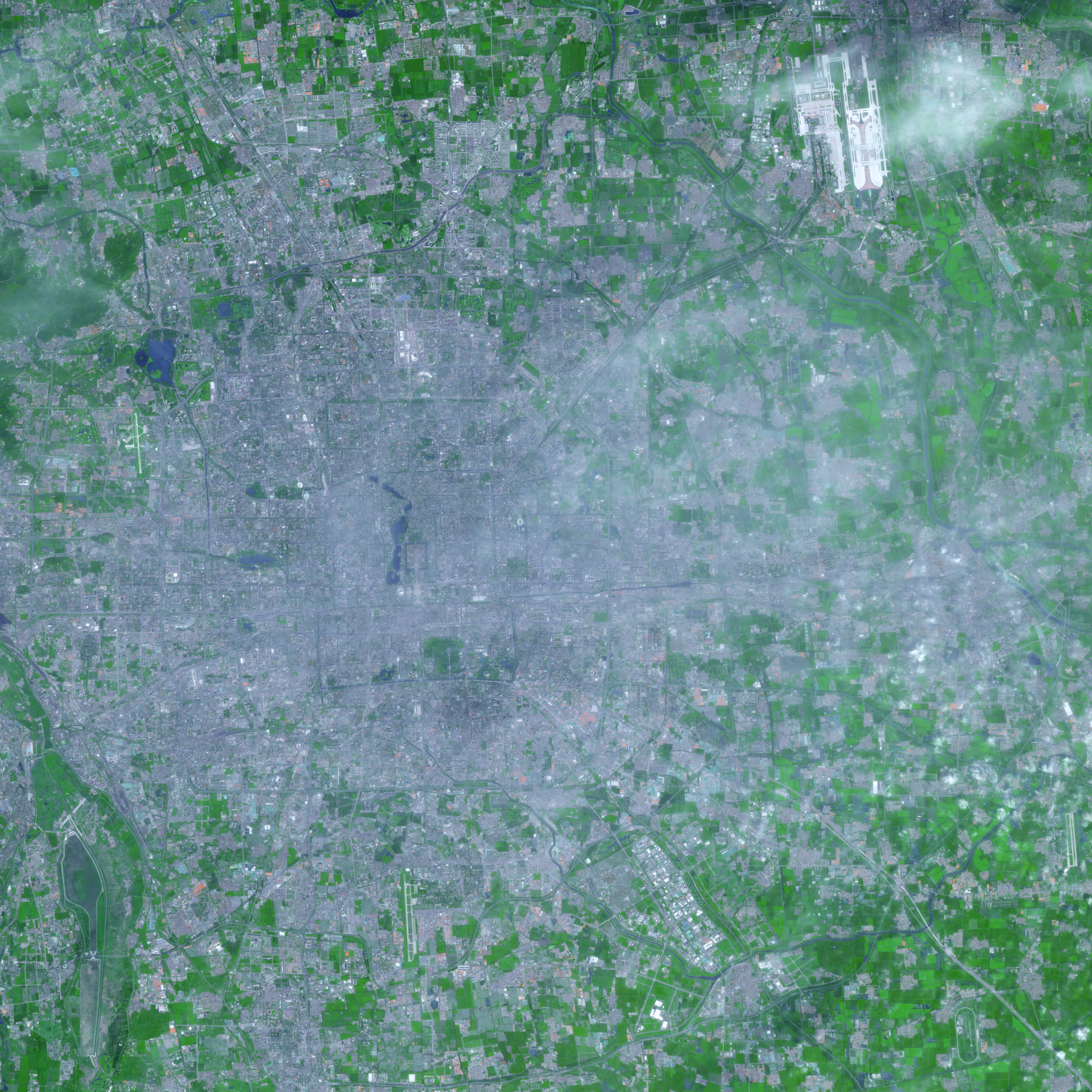
Satellite view of the city within the 6th Ring Road

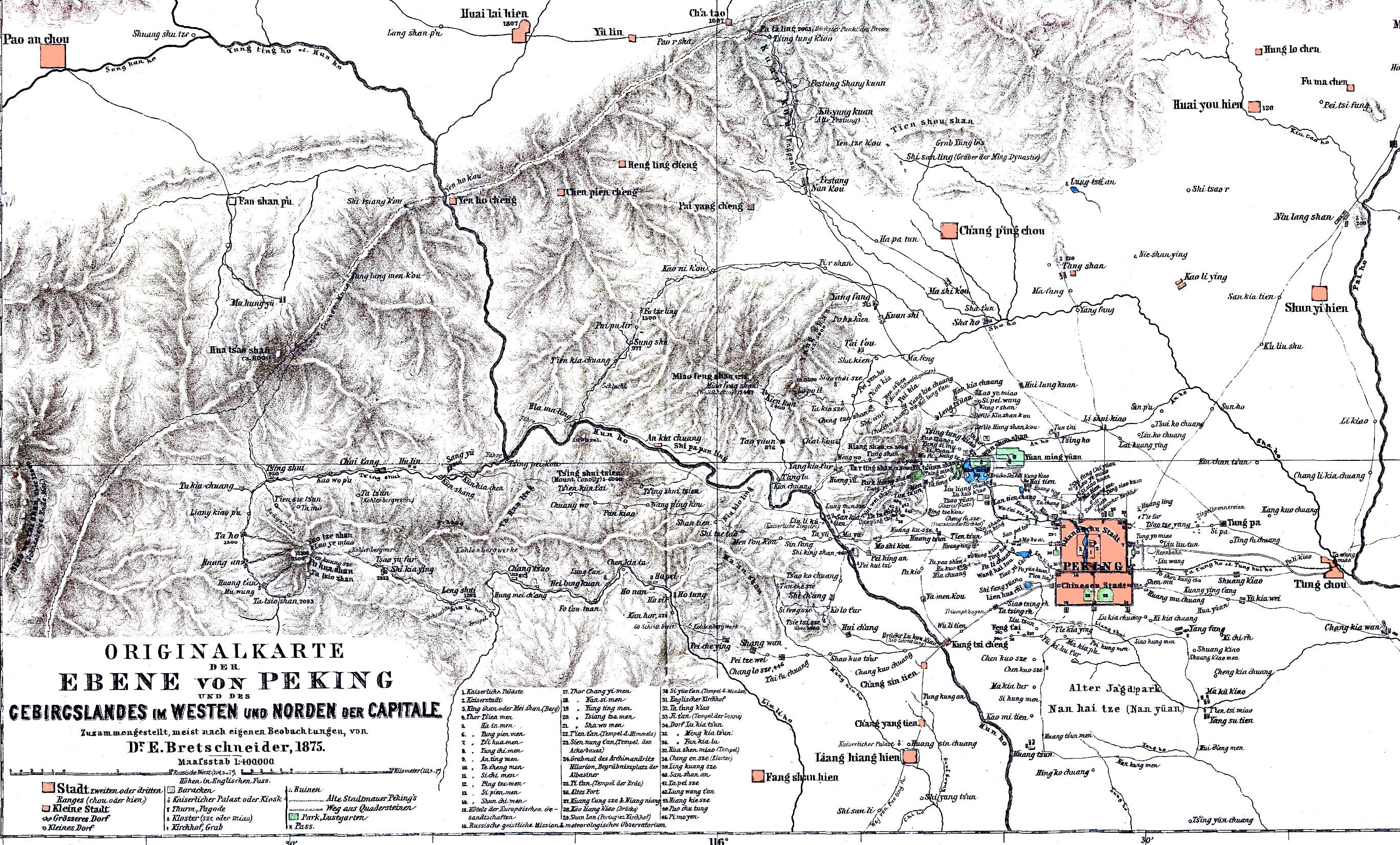
The Beijing area in 1875

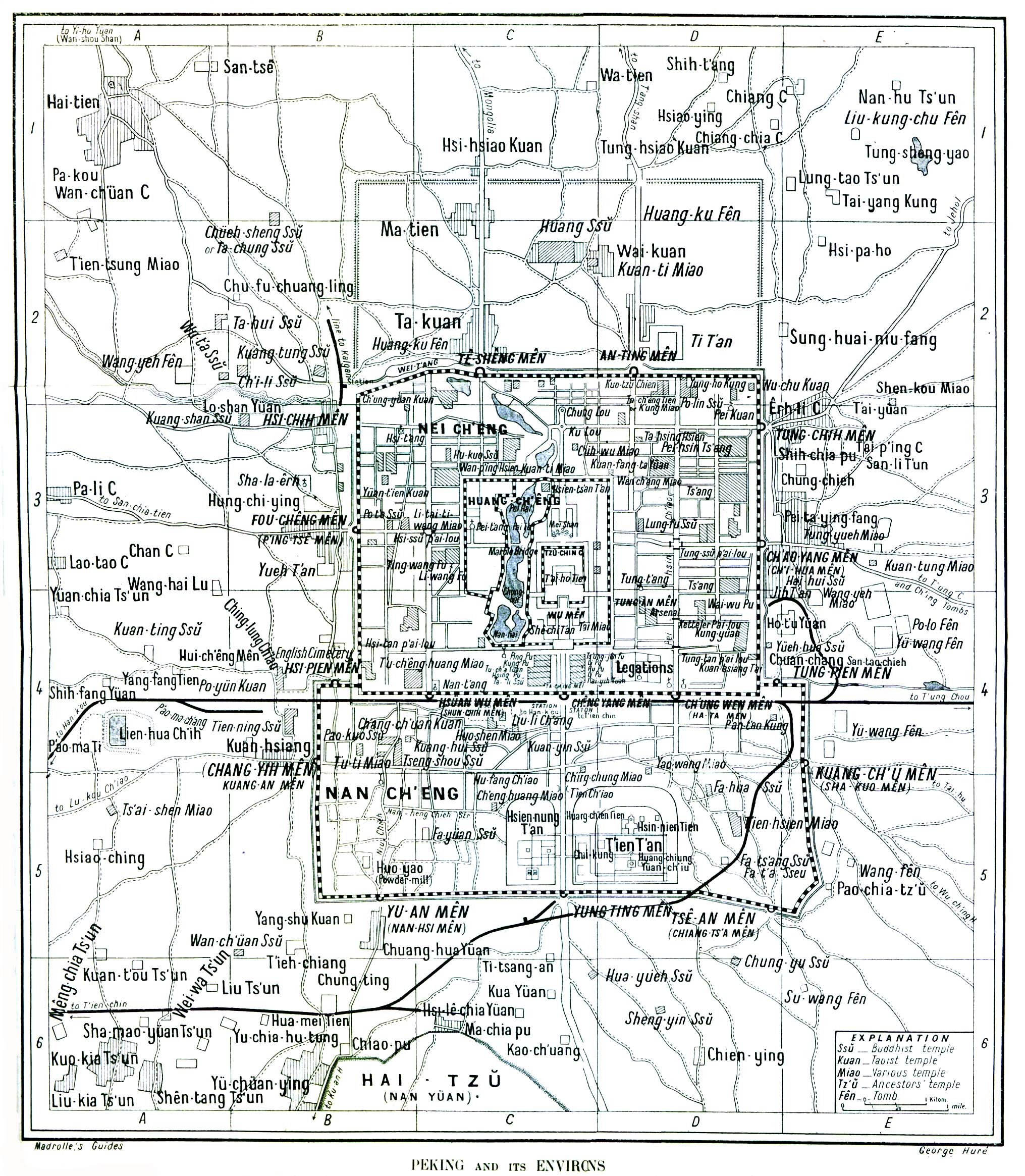
Beijing in 1912

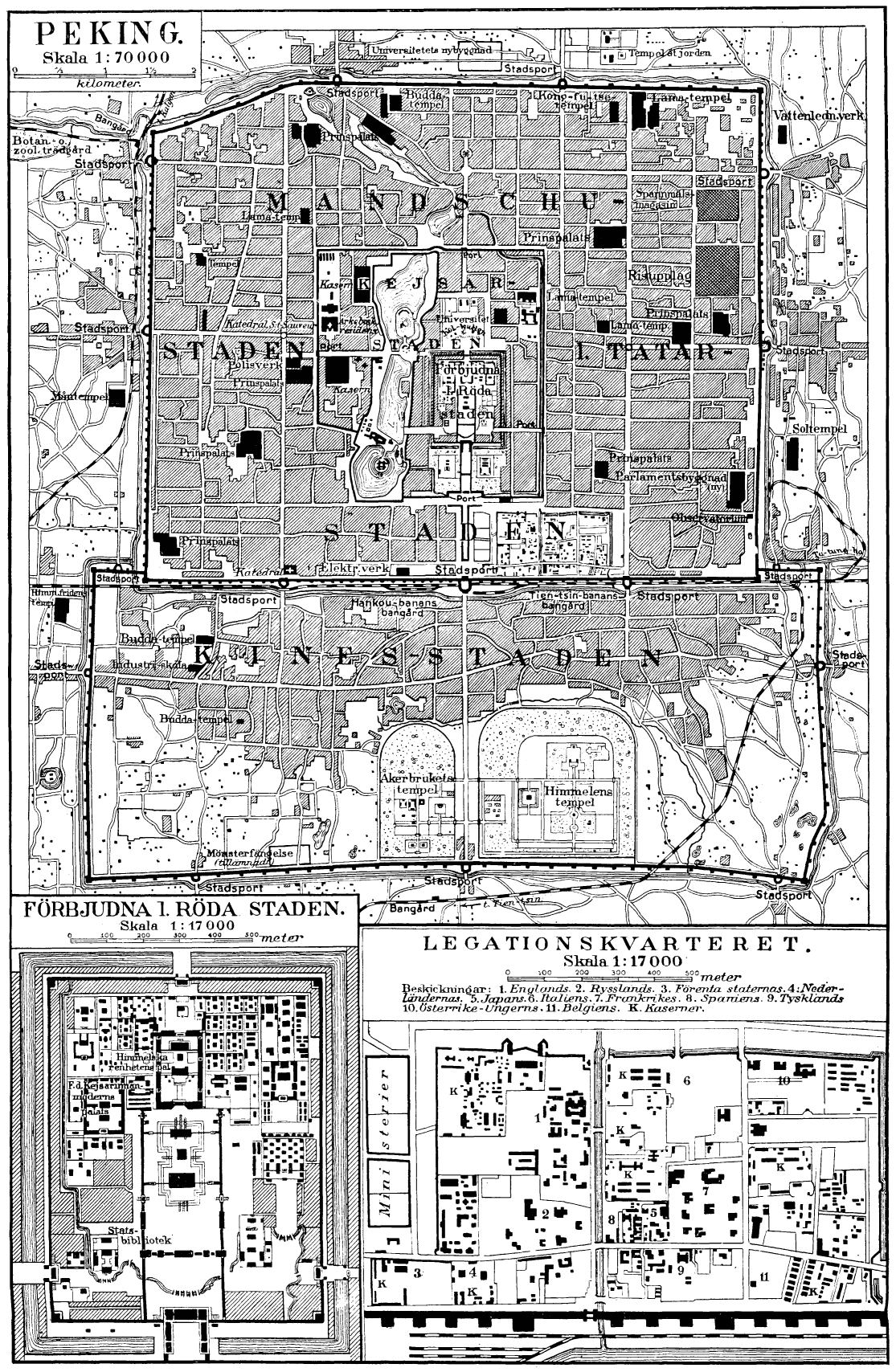
The old city in 1916

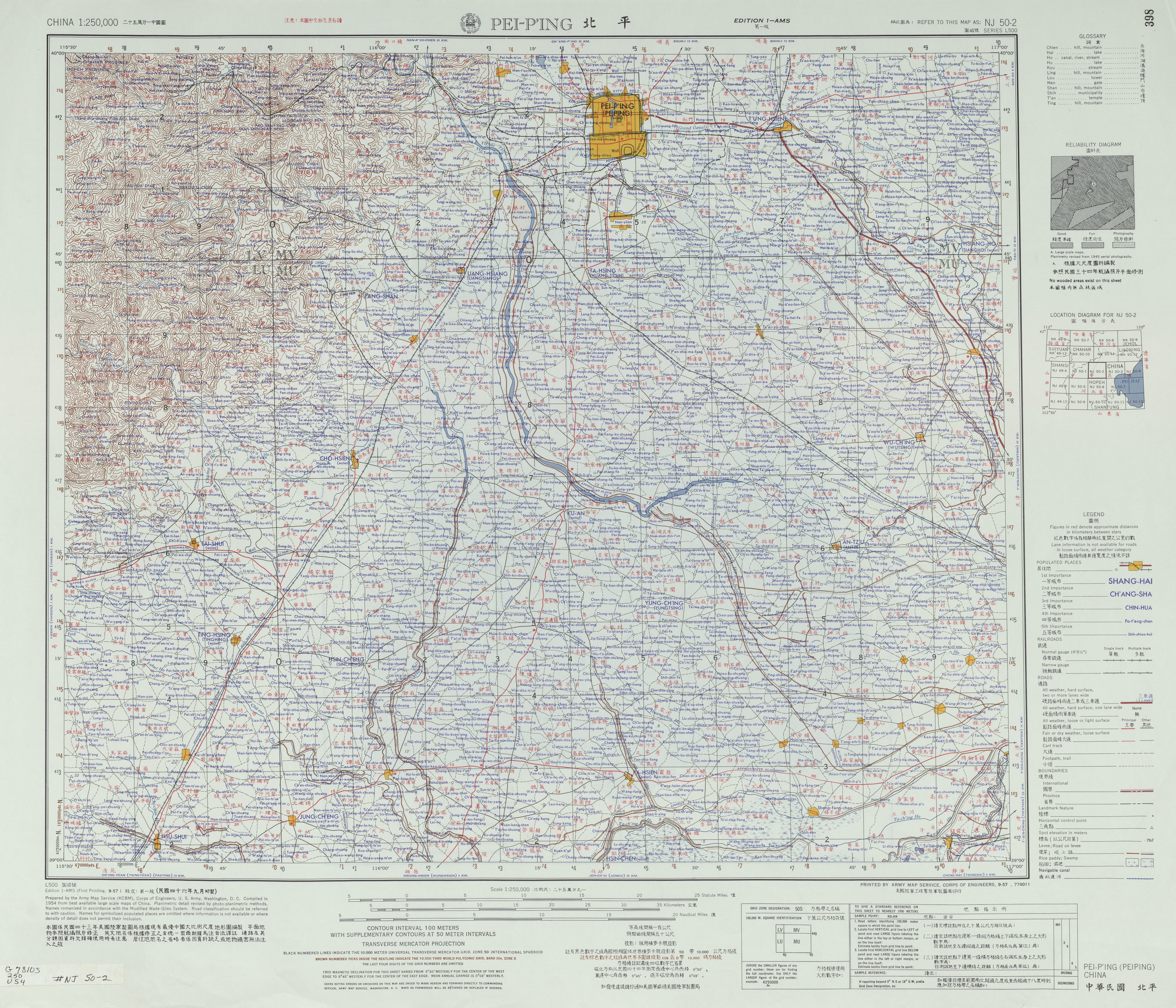
Map of Beijing (labeled as PEI-P’ING (PEIPING) 北平) and nearby areas (1954)

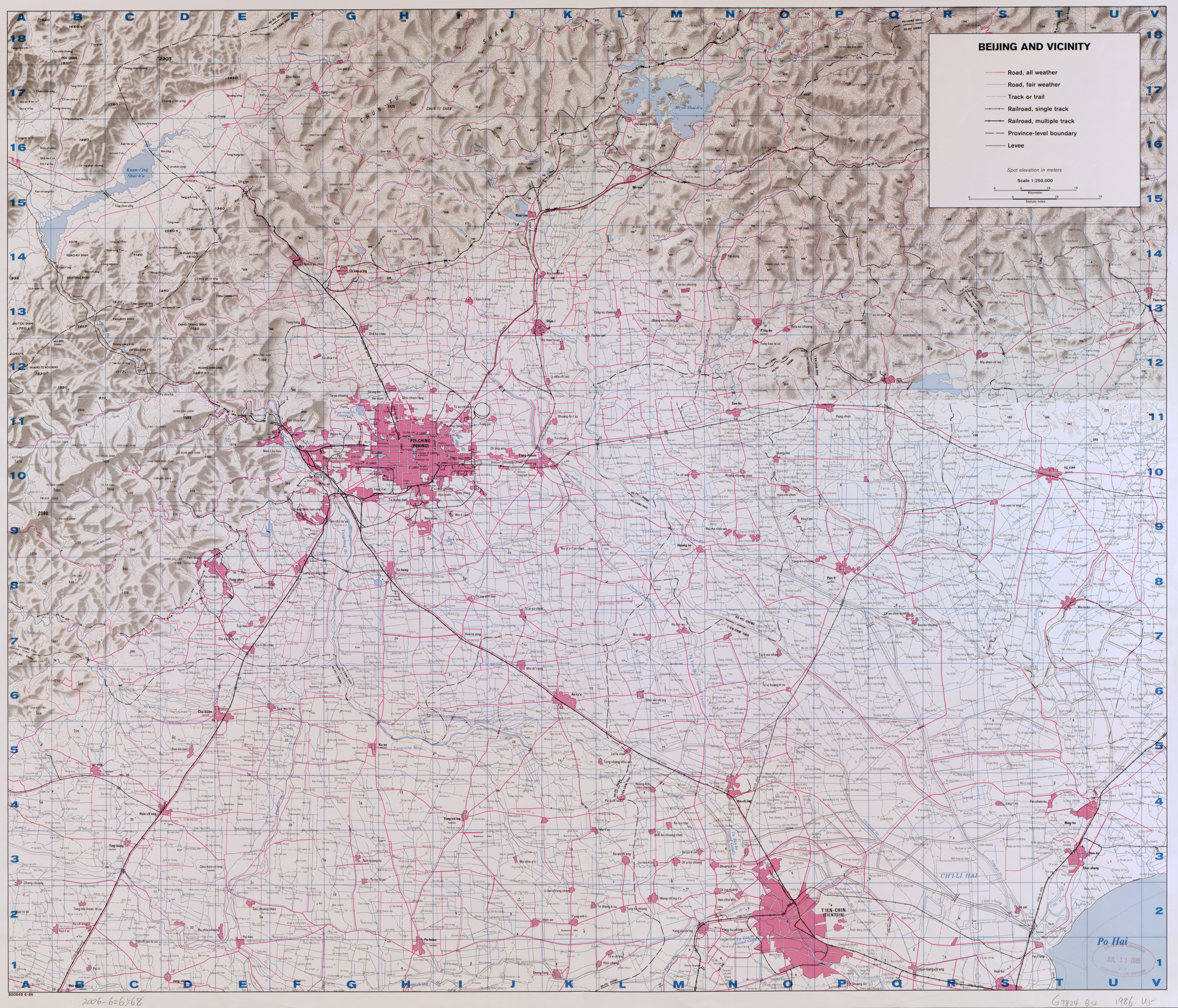
Beijing and vicinity in 1986

Map showing the old walled city, including the inner and outer cities

Animation zooming down to Beijing in 1978 via Landsat-3. The data then dissolves to Beijing in 2010 through the sensors of Landsat-5. The red areas are non-vegetated urban areas.

== See also ==
- Neighborhoods in Beijing
- Geography of China
- North China Plain
