= List of international prime ministerial trips made by Nawaz Sharif =

The Prime Ministers of Pakistan, Nawaz Sharif and Shahid Khaqan Abbasi made dozens of foreign trips during the tenure of Pakistan Muslim League (N), from 2013-18. Here is the list of foreign diplomatic visits made by these two Prime Ministers.

*Foreign visits (especially private visits) which don't include any considerable engagement are excluded from this list.

== Nawaz Sharif ==
Prime Minister: 5 June, 2013 - 28 July, 2017

=== 2013 ===
Country	Date/s	Engagements	Ref.
China	3-8 July	Met with President Xi Jinping and Premier Li Keqiang	
Saudi Arabia	2-4 August	Met with King Abdullah and Crown Prince Salman bin Abdulaziz.	
Turkey	16-18 September	Met with President Abdullah Gül.	
United Nations	24-29 September	Attended "UNGA Session". Met with Indian PM Manmohan Singh and US SecState John Kerry.	
United States	20-23 October	Met with President Barack Obama.	
UK	28-30 October	Attended "9th World Islamic Economic Forum Summit". Held trilateral meeting with Cameron and Hamid Karzai.	
Sri Lanka	14-17 November	Attended "2013 CHOGM".	
Thailand	17-19 November	Met with PM of Thailand Yingluck Shinawatra.	
Afghanistan	30 November	Met with President Hamid Karzai.	

=== 2014 ===
Country	Date/s	Engagements	Ref.
Turkey	12-14 February	Attended "8th Afghan-Pak-Turk Trilateral Summit".	
Netherlands	24-25 March	Attended "2014 Nuclear Security Summit".	
China	9-11 April	Attended "Boao Forum for Asia". Met with Premier Li Keqiang.	
UK	30 April - 2 May	Met with PM David Cameron.	
Iran	11-12 May	Met with Ali Khamenei and President Hassan Rouhani.	
India	26-27 May	Attended "First oath of office ceremony of Narendra Modi". Also met outgoing PM Manmohan Singh.	
Tajikistan	17-18 June	Met with President Emomali Rahmon.	
Saudi Arabia	21-22 July	Met with Crown Prince Salman bin Abdulaziz and Deputy CP Muqrin bin Abdulaziz.	
United Nations	24-29 September	Attended "UNGA Session". Met with Secretary General Ban Ki-moon. Co-chaired UN peacekeeping summit with US Vice President Joe Biden.	
China	7-9 November	Attended "Dialogue on Strengthening Connectivity Partnership". Met with President and Premier of China.	
Germany	10-11 November	Met with German Chancellor Angela Merkel, she hosted official lunch in his honour.	
UK	12-13 November	Inaugurates Pakistan-UK Energy Dialogue.	
Nepal	25-27 November	Attended "18th SAARC summit". Met with PM of Nepal Sushil Koirala and Indian PM Modi.	
UK	2-4 December	Attended "London Conference on Afghanistan".	

=== 2015 ===
Country	Date/s	Engagements	Ref.
Bahrain	7-8 January	Met with King Hamad bin Isa.	
Saudi Arabia	15-16 January	Met with King Abdullah and Crown Prince Salman bin Abdulaziz.	
Saudi Arabia	4-6 March	Met with King Salman.	
Turkey	3 April	Met with President Erdoğan and PM Ahmet Davutoğlu. Discussed situation in Yemen.	
Saudi Arabia	24 April	Met with King Salman. Discussed situation in Yemen	
UK	24-26 April	Met with British PM David Cameron.	
Afghanistan	12 May	Met with President Ashraf Ghani.	
Turkmenistan	20-21 May	Met with President Gurbanguly Berdimuhamedow. Discussed bilateral ties and TAPI Pipeline Project.	
Kyrgyzstan	21-22 May	Met with President Almazbek Atambaev.	
Tajikistan	9-10 June	Addressed "Water for Life" conference. Met Ban Ki-moon and Emomali Rahmon.	
Norway	6-8 July	Attended "Oslo Summit on Education for Development".	
Russia	9-10 July	Attended "15th SCO Head of States Summit". Met with President Putin and Indian PM Modi.	
Saudi Arabia	12-19 July	Performed Umrah. Met with King Salman.	
Belarus	10-12 August	Met with President and Prime Minister of Belarus.	
Kazakhstan	25-26 August	Met with President Nursultan Nazarbayev.	
UK	23-26 September	Met with PM Cameron.	
United Nations	26-30 September	Attended "UNGA Session". Met with John Kerry.	
United States	20-23 October	Met with President Barack Obama.	
Uzbekistan	17-18 November	Met with President Islam Karimov.	
Malta	27-29 November	Attended "2015 Commonwealth Heads of Government Meeting".	
France	29-30 November	Attended "COP 21 conference". Met with President François Hollande, also met Indian PM Narendra Modi (informally).	
Turkmenistan	12-13 December	Attended "Inauguration ceremony of TAPI Gas Pipeline".	
China	14-15 December	Attended "14th SCO Head of Governments". Met with Premier of China Li Keqiang.	

=== 2016 ===
Country	Date/s	Engagements	Ref.
Sri Lanka	4-6 January	Met with Prime Minister Ranil Wickremesinghe.	
Saudi Arabia	18-19 January	Met with King Salman.	
Iran	19 January	Met with President Hassan Rouhani.	
Switzerland	20-23 January	Attended "World Economic Forum meeting". Met with Afghan President Ashraf Ghani and US Vice President Joe Biden (trilaterally).	
Qatar	10-11 February	Met with Emir of Qatar Tamim bin Hamad Al Thani.	
Saudi Arabia	9-11 March	Met with King Salman.	
Tajikistan	11-12 May	Attended "CASA-1000 launch ceremony". Met wit President Emomali Rahmon.	
United Nations	19-27 September	Attended "UNGA Summit". Met with various world leaders.	
Azerbaijan	13-15 October	Met with President Ilham Aliyev and Prime Minister Artur Rasizade.	
Turkmenistan	25-26 November	Attended "Global Conference on Sustainable Transport".	
Bosnia and Herzegovina	20-22 December	Met with Chairman of Council of Ministers Denis Zvizdić.	

=== 2017 ===
Country	Date/s	Engagements	Ref.
Turkey	22-24 February	Attended "5th Session of Pakistan-Turkey High Level Strategic Cooperation Council".	
Kuwait	6-7 March	Met with Emir of Kuwait Sabah Al-Ahmad Al-Jaber Al-Sabah.	
China	12-15 May	Attended "2017 Belt and Road Forum". Met with President Xi Jinping.	

== Shahid Khaqan Abbasi ==
Prime Minister: 1 August, 2017 - 31 May, 2018

=== 2017 ===
Country	Date/s	Engagements	Ref.
Saudi Arabia	23 August	Met with Crown Prince MBS.	
United Nations	18-22 September	Attended "UNGA Session", met with US Vice President Mike Pence.	
Turkey	19-22 October	Attended "D-8 Summit".	
Saudi Arabia	27 November	Met with King Salman.	
Russia	30 November - 1 December	Attended "16th SCO Heads of Government Summit". Met with Russian Prime Minister Dmitry Medvedev.	

=== 2018 ===
Country	Date/s	Engagements	Ref.
China	8-10 April	Attended "Boao Forum for Asia conference". Met with President Xi.	
Saudi Arabia	15-16 April	Witnessed the closing ceremony of the 24-country joint military exercise.	

== See also ==
- Foreign relations of Pakistan
