= Neighborhoods in Beijing =

Beijing has many neighborhoods, some of which are new and others with a long history.

== Prominent neighborhoods ==
- Qianmen 前门
- Tian'anmen 天安门
- Di'anmen 地安门
- Chongwenmen 崇文门
- Xuanwumen 宣武门
- Fuchengmen 阜成门
- Xizhimen 西直门
- Deshengmen 德胜门
- Andingmen 安定门
- Sanlitun 三里屯
- Dongzhimen 东直门
- Chaoyangmen 朝阳门
- Yongdingmen 永定门
- Zuo'anmen 左安门
- You'anmen 右安门
- Guangqumen 广渠门
- Guang'anmen 广安门
- Huashi 花市
- Xibianmen 西便门
- Hepingmen 和平门
- Fuxingmen 复兴门
- Jianguomen 建国门
- Gongzhufen 公主坟
- Fangzhuang 方庄
- Guomao 国贸
- Hepingli 和平里
- Ping'anli 平安里
- Beixinqiao 北新桥
- Jiaodaokou 交道口
- Kuanjie 宽街
- Wangjing 望京
- Wangfujing 王府井
- Dengshikou 灯市口
- Wudaokou 五道口
- Xidan 西单
- Dongdan 东单
- Zhongguancun 中关村
- Panjiayuan 潘家园
- Beijing CBD 北京商务中心区
- Yayuncun 亚运村
- Shifoying 石佛营

== Ethnic enclaves ==
In the case of some enclaves the name starts with the name of the originating province and the name ends in cun (C: 村, P: cūn) or "Village". For instance, Anhuicun or "Anhui Village" houses people from that room, and Henancun or "Henan Village" has settlers from that region.

Several ethnic enclaves house rural migrant workers based on their origin, such as Henancun and Zhejiangcun (Zhejiang Village). Other ethnic enclaves consist of ethnic minorities who are established as permanent Beijing residents, including several Hui people settlements, such as Niujie and Madian,

Wenfei Wang, Shangyi Zhou, and Cindy Fan wrote that Hui people, despite being permanent Beijingers, are "highly segregated" from Han people "socially and spatially". They added that the survival of Hui neighborhoods in Beijing is "solely dependent on the existing Hui residents and communities" because the communities are "not as readily replenished by new migrants" and because Hui see themselves as Beijingers and their communities as having "more permanent meanings" compared to migrant worker communities.

=== Migrant worker enclaves ===
Residents of the migrant worker enclaves support each other in looking for jobs and dealing with the local government. Inhabitants consider themselves "compatriots" (S: 同乡, P: tóngxiāng), a word equivalent to the English "homies". In the rural migrant worker communities there is a high turnover as members arrive for work and leave to go back to their hometowns. Some residents work in family workshops and go to the city to sell their wares while others commute to work within the city. Most residents plan to eventually return to their home lands and do not consider themselves to be from Beijing. Even though the rural migrant workers are also Han Chinese they are considered to be of a lower status because they are not permanent residents and because they have rural upbringings and low socioeconomic statuses, so each community, in the words of Wenfei Wang, Shangyi Zhou, and Cindy Fan, "connotes a native place–based ethnicity distinct from the urbanites".

During periods the Beijing government has attempted to dismantle ethnic villages in the periphery of Beijing. In the 1990s the government made attempts to dismantle Zhejiangcun, including one time in 1995, and had also acted against Henancun (C: 河南村, P: Hénán-cūn) and Xinjiangcun.

While Uighurs, like the Hui, are Muslim, the Uighurs in Beijing had migrated there more recently than the Hui. Wenfei Wang, Shangyi Zhou, and C. Cindy Fan, authors of "Growth and Decline of Muslim Hui Enclaves in Beijing," stated that the Beijing Uighur communities are "much smaller in size" compared to Hui communities.

== See also ==
- Geography of Beijing
