= Mutianyu Village =

Mutianyu Village, Beijing
- Village
- Interactive map of Mutianyu Village, Beijing
- Coordinates: 40.426156°N 116.555758°E
- Country: China
- Municipality: Beijing
- District: Huairou District
- Township: Bohai

Population
  - Total: 350
- Time zone: UTC+8 (Chinese Standard Time)

Mutianyu Village (Chinese: 慕田峪; pinyin: Mùtiányù) is a settlement at the foot of the Mutianyu section of the Great Wall of China. It, along with the villages of Beigou, Tianxianyu and Xinying, comprise the Township of Bohai.
