= 2017 Belt and Road Forum =

Belt and Road Forum for International Cooperation
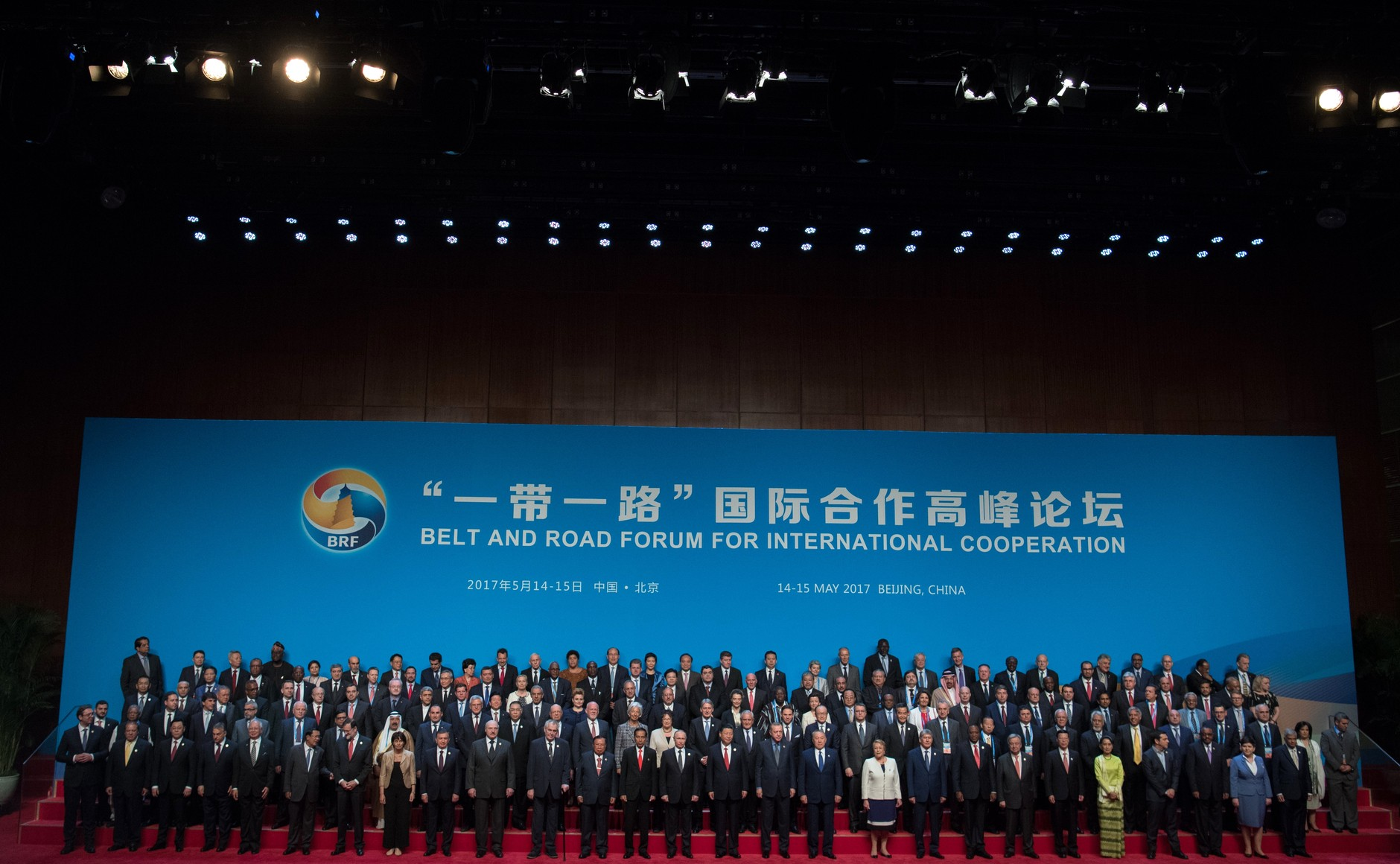
- Participants of the 2017 BRI Forum
- Host country: China
- Date: 14–15 May 2017
- Cities: Beijing
- Precedes: 2019 Belt and Road Forum
- Website: 2017.beltandroadforum.org

The 1st Belt and Road Forum for International Cooperation was held between 14 and 15 May 2017 in Beijing, China. The summit drew 29 foreign heads of state and government and representatives from more than 130 countries and 70 international organizations.

== Agenda and activities ==
The purpose of the forum is described by Wang Xiaotao, deputy head of the National Development and Reform Commission, in an interview with Xinhua as building "a more open and efficient international cooperation platform; a closer, stronger partnership network; and to push for a more just, reasonable and balanced international governance system." Western media coverage portrays the forum in a similar way with CNN referring to the event under the headline "China's new world order" and the Los Angeles Times running the article "Globalization 2.0: How China's two-day summit aims to shape a new world order".

At the Forum's opening ceremony, Chinese leader Xi Jinping emphasized the importance of developing a Digital Silk Road:

We should pursue innovation-driven development and intensify cooperation in frontier areas such as digital economy, artificial intelligence, nanotechnology, and quantum computing, and advance the development of big data, cloud computing, and smart cities, so as to turn them into a Digital Silk Road of the 21st Century.

== Participants and representatives ==
=== Heads of state and government ===
People's Republic of China (Host):

- CCP General Secretary & President Xi Jinping
- Premier Li Keqiang
  - Vice Premier Zhang Gaoli

The forum is attended by 29 foreign heads of state and government and their respective delegations:

- Prime Minister Beata Szydło of Poland
- Prime Minister Viktor Orbán of Hungary
- Prime Minister Aleksandar Vučić of Serbia
- Prime Minister Alexis Tsipras of Greece
- Prime Minister Paolo Gentiloni of Italy
- Prime Minister Mariano Rajoy of Spain
- Prime Minister Hailemariam Desalegn of Ethiopia
- Prime Minister Nawaz Sharif of Pakistan
- Prime Minister Ranil Wickremesinghe of Sri Lanka
- Prime Minister Jargaltulga Erdenebat of Mongolia
- Prime Minister Hun Sen of Cambodia
- Prime Minister Najib Razak of Malaysia
- Prime Minister Josaia Voreqe Bainimarama of Fiji
- State Counsellor Aung San Suu Kyi of Myanmar
- President Rodrigo Duterte of the Philippines
- President Trần Đại Quang of Vietnam
- President Joko Widodo of Indonesia
- President Bounnhang Vorachith of Laos
- President Uhuru Kenyatta of Kenya
- President Vladimir Putin of Russia
- President Alexander Lukashenko of Belarus
- President Nursultan Nazarbayev of Kazakhstan
- President Shavkat Mirziyoyev of Uzbekistan
- President Almazbek Atambayev of Kyrgyzstan
- President Recep Tayyip Erdoğan of Turkey
- President Miloš Zeman of the Czech Republic
- President Doris Leuthard of Switzerland
- President Mauricio Macri of Argentina
- President Michelle Bachelet of Chile

=== Heads of international organizations ===
- Secretary-General of the United Nations, António Guterres
- World Bank President, Jim Yong Kim
- Managing director of the International Monetary Fund, Christine Lagarde
- Director-General of the International Renewable Energy Agency, Adnan Z. Amin
- Executive Chairman of the World Economic Forum, Klaus Schwab
- President of the United Nations General Assembly, Peter Thomson
- Secretary General of the European Bank for Reconstruction and Development, Enzo Quattrociocche
- Interpol Secretary General Jürgen Stock
- Director General of the World Trade Organization Roberto Azevêdo
- Director-General of UNESCO Irina Bokova
- (Commonwealth of Independent States) Secretary General of CIS Sergei Lebedev
- Director General of the World Health Organization Margaret Chan

=== Ministerial level ===
The online magazine The Diplomat documents the following incomplete list of ministerial level attendees.

- Afghanistan: Unspecified minister-level delegation
- Australia: Trade Minister Steven Ciobo
- Azerbaijan: Economy Minister Shahin Mustafayev
- Bangladesh: Unspecified minister-level delegation
- Brazil: Secretary for Strategic Affairs Hussein Ali Kalout
- North Korea: Minister of External Economic Relations Kim Yong-jae
- Egypt: Trade and Industry Minister Tarek Kabil
- European Union: Parliament Secretary General Klaus Welle
- Finland: Minister of Transport and Communications Anne Berner
- France: Former Prime Minister, Member of the French Senate Jean-Pierre Raffarin
- Germany: Minister of Economic Affairs and Energy Brigitte Zypries
- Iran: Minister of Economy and Finance Ali Tayebnia
- Iraq: unspecified minister-level delegation
- Kuwait: Minister of the Amiri Diwan Affairs Sheikh Nasser Sabah Al-Ahmad Al-Jaber
- Maldives: Economic Minister Mohamed Saeed
- Nepal: Deputy Prime Minister and Finance Minister Krishna Bahadur Mahara
- New Zealand: Science and Innovation Minister Paul Goldsmith
- Qatar: Minister of Transport and Communications Jassim Saif Ahmed Al Sulaiti
- Romania: Deputy Prime Minister and Minister of Environment Gratiela Gavrilescu
- Saudi Arabia: Minister of Energy, Industry, and Mineral Resources Khalid A. Al-Falih
- Singapore: Minister for National Development and Second Minister for Finance Lawrence Wong
- South Korea: National Assembly member Park Byeoung-seug
- Syria: unspecified minister-level delegation
- Thailand: Minister of Foreign Affairs Don Pramudwinai, Minister of Transportation Arkhom Termpittayapaisith, Minister of Commerce Apiradi Tantraporn, Minister of Digital for Economy and Society Pichet Durongkaveroj, and Minister of Science and Technology Atchaka Sibunruang
- Trinidad and Tobago: Minister in the Office of the Prime Minister and Minister in the Ministry of the Attorney General and Legal Affairs Stuart Young
- Tunisia: Culture Minister Mohamed Zine El-Abidine
- Ukraine: Unspecified ministerial-level delegation
- United Arab Emirates: Minister of State and Group CEO of ADNOC Dr. Sultan Ahmed Al Jaber
- United Kingdom: Chancellor of the Exchequer Philip Hammond
- United States: delegation led by White House adviser Matt Pottinger.
- Japan: delegation led by Toshihiro Nikai, secretary-general of the ruling party Liberal Democratic Party.

== Venues ==
In 2017, the events were held at National Convention Center in the urban Chaoyang District and Yanqi Lake International Convention Center and Jixian hall at Yanqi Lake Conference Center in the outer suburb Huairou District.
