= Beijing Knot =

Branch point in the Great Wall of China

Coordinates: 40°27′46″N 116°29′40″E

Beijing Knot (北京结; Běijīng jié) is a branch point in the Great Wall of China located about 60 kilometres (37 mi) north of central Beijing in China and marks the most northwestern tower of Jiankou. At Beijing Knot the main body of the Great Wall from Shanhai Pass in the east splits up into two branches. One continues west towards Juyong Pass and further to Niangzi Pass and forms the inner wall. The other branches continues northwest towards Zhangjiakou and further west towards the Yellow River and forms the outer wall.
