= Shifoying =

Neighborhood in Beijing, China

Shifoying (Chinese: 石佛营; pinyin: shífóyíng) literally the "Stone Buddha Encampment", is a residential neighborhood in the Balizhuang Subdistrict of Chaoyang District in Beijing. The neighborhood is bound to the west by the Eastern Fourth Ring Road, to the east by the Beijing-Baotou Railway, to the north by Yaojiayuan Lu and to the south by Shilipu. Within Shifoying, the neighborhood is bisected by Shifoying Lu into two sub-neighborhoods, Shifoying Dongli (Shifoying East) and Shifoying Xili (Shifoying West).

== Name and history ==
Shifoying is named after Shifoying Village in the Dongfeng area of what used to be the eastern outskirts of Beijing. The village was reputed to have an ancient monastery with a stone buddha. Shifoying Village appeared in the 1933 edition of the Beiping Atlas and, after the founding of the China in 1949, merged with Banqiao Village to form Shifoying. In 1987, Shifoying was zoned into Chaoyang District's Balizhuang Subdistrict and in 1990 began to be developed into a modern residential neighborhood with high rise apartment buildings. By 2001, with the completion of the Fifth Ring Road, Shifoying was fully encompassed by the growing metropolis of Beijing.

Shifoying Primary School is located in Shifoying Dongli. The Chaoyang District Real Estate Title Registration Bureau is located at No. 128 Shifoying Dongli.

== Transport ==
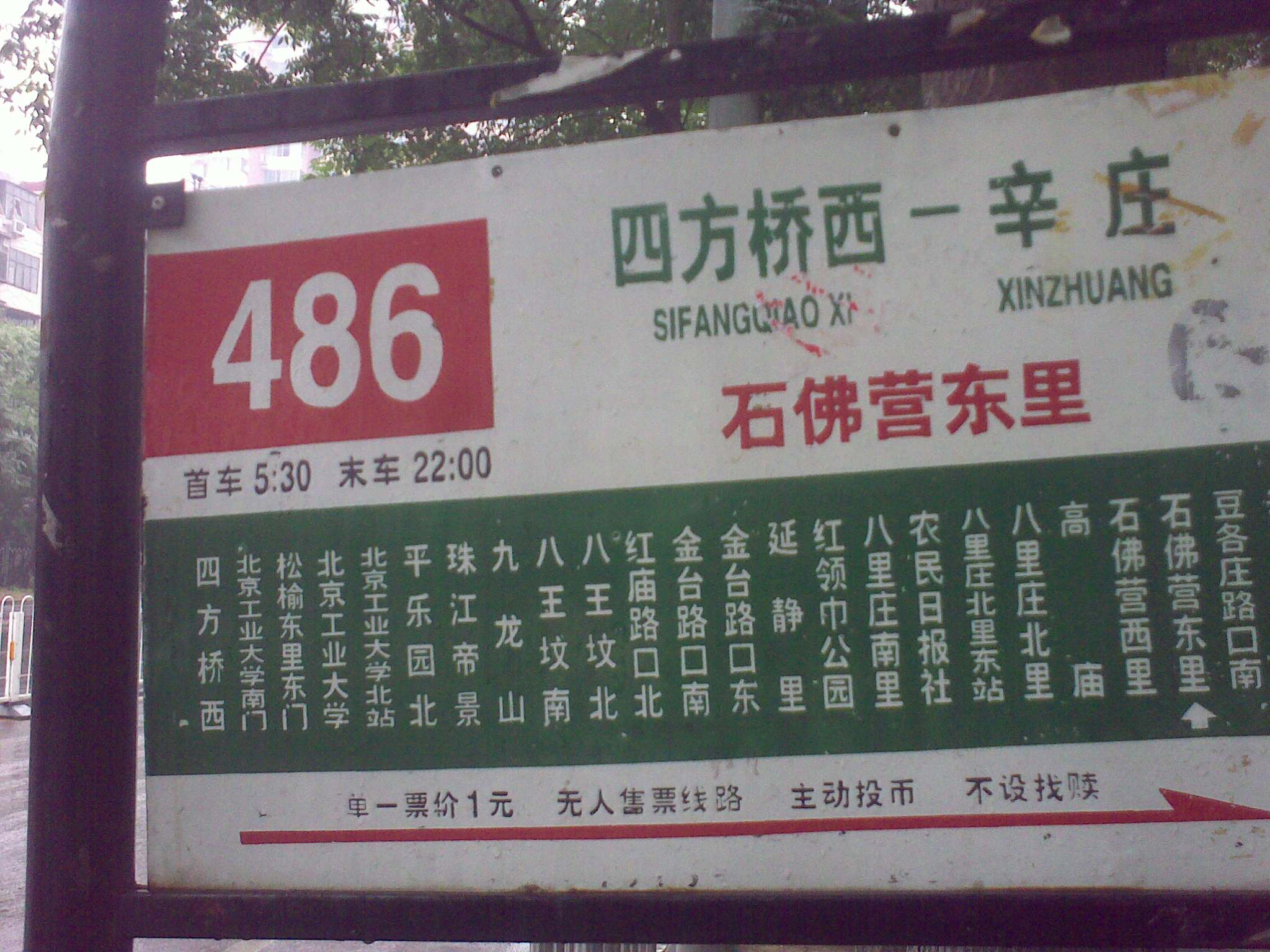
Beijing bus sign at Shifoying Dongli showing the bus route number (486), hours of service (5:30 - 22:00), name of the stop (石佛营东里), terminus (Sifangqiao Xi & Xinzhuang), fare schedule (flate rate ¥1, exact fare), stops along route, and direction of travel (red arrow pointing toward Xinzhuang)

Shifoying is served by the following Beijing Bus routes:

- Shifoying Dongli - 408, 486, 595, 640, 675, 991 and 夜3;
- Shifoying Xili - 408, 595 and 专111;
- Shifoying Xili East - 486, 595, 911 and 专111;
- Dougezhuang Intersection South - 408, 486, 595, 675, 991, 夜3 and 专111;
- Dougezhuang Intersection West - 302, 350, 417, 431, 496, 499, 502, 619, 650, 672, 673, 675, 989, 特16, 夜3, 夜25, 运通111, 运通122 and 专111.

As of May 2013, the nearest Beijing Subway stations are Shilipu to the south on Line 6 and Tuanjiehu to the west on Line 10. Line 3, under planning, may have a stop at Shifoying.
