= Jundu Mountains =

Mountain range in northern China

Coordinates: 40.5°N 116.3°E

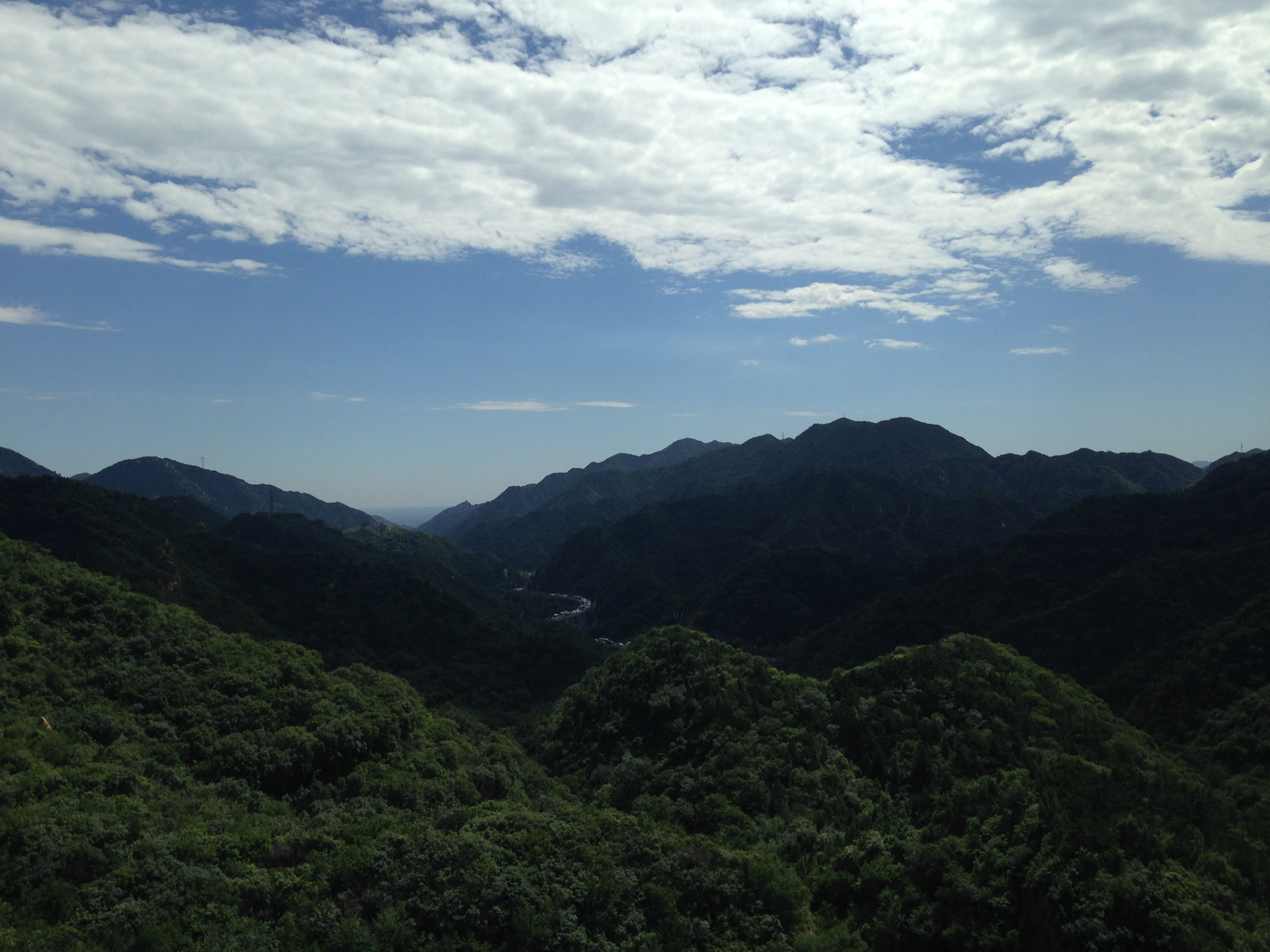
Jundu Mountains with the Great Wall of China at Badaling in the horizon.

Jundu Mountains (军都山; Jūndūshān) is a mountain range north of Beijing in China. Jundu Mountains represent the west part of the Yan Mountains. The Great Wall of China passes through Jundu Mountains with famous sections as Badaling.
