= Jiankou =

Section of the Great Wall of China

Coordinates: 40°27′19.80″N 116°31′31.77″E

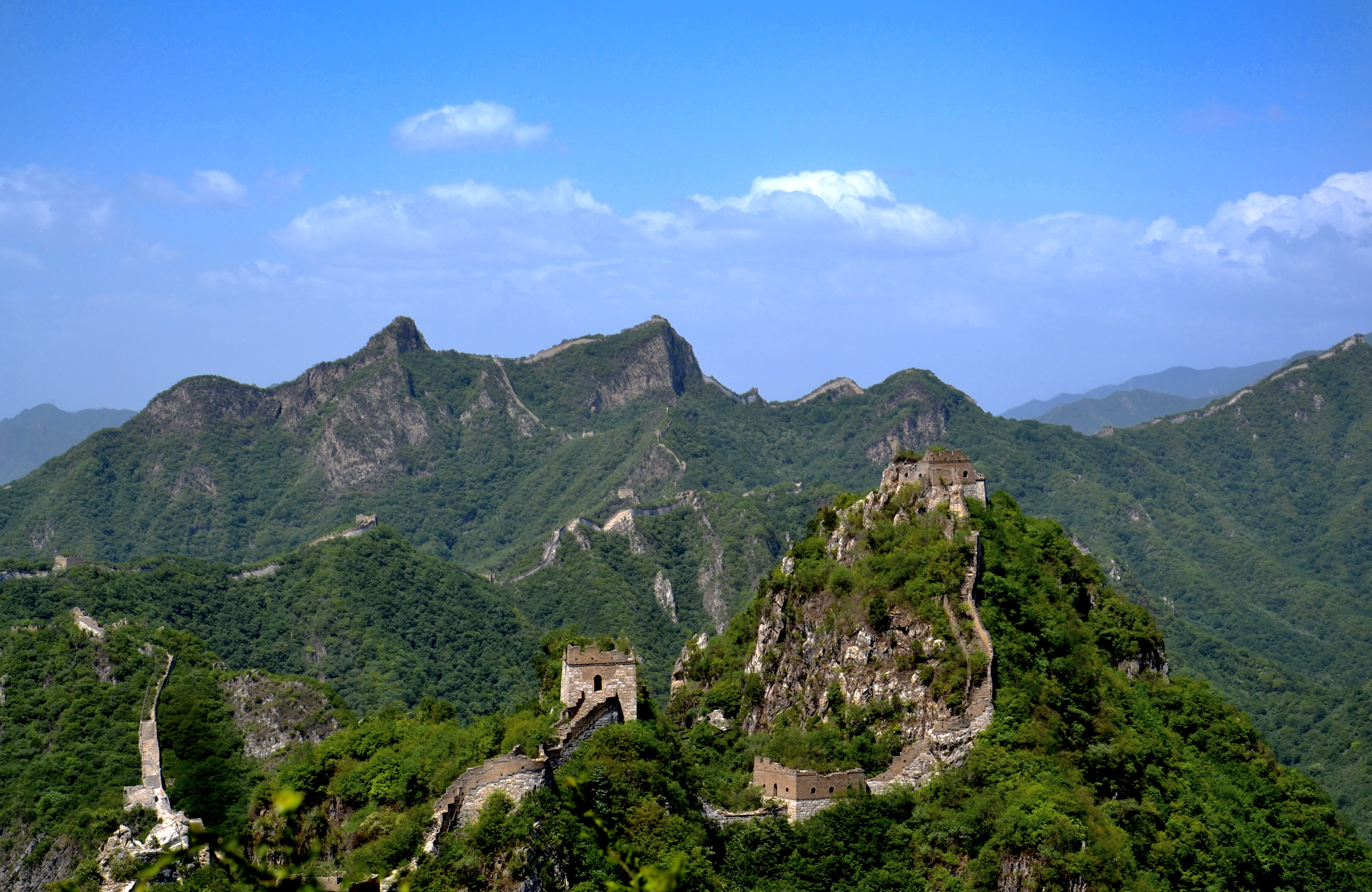
Jiankou

Jiankou (Chinese: 箭扣; pinyin: Jiànkòu) is a section of the Great Wall of China. In English, 'Jiankou' is translated to 'Arrow Nock' as the shape of the mountain resembles an arrow with the collapsed ridge opening up, reminiscent of an arrow nock. The wall is 20 km long and located 73 kilometres (45 mi) north of Beijing in the Huairou District. The Jiankou section of the Great Wall of China is located between the Mutianyu and the Moshikou sections of the Great Wall of China. It is built on a steep mountain ridge and a popular hike amongst visitors.

As well as natural causes, human activities are increasingly raising concern for the preservation of this section of the wall, as "the lack of work on the wall made it picturesque, but dangerous".

This tourist attraction was temporarily suspended during 2020 due to COVID-19.

== History ==
The Jiankou section of the wall was constructed in 1368 during the period of the Ming dynasty. During the Ming Dynasty, this wall was continuously rebuilt and reworked up until 1644. It is made from dolomite, a white sedimentary carbonate rock.

== Hiking ==
The Jiankou Great Wall is a non-ticketed section that runs from the 23rd tower of Mutianyu Great Wall to Beijing Knot, passing through landmarks such as Ox Horn Edge, Jiankou (Arrow Nock), Sky Ladder, Upward Flying Eagle Tower (鹰飞倒仰 / 鷹飛倒仰), Beijing Knot and Nine-Eye Tower. It is not maintained and not a public tourist attraction.

This section of the wall is mostly unrestored, with recent restoration done in 2015-2019 which helped preserve a 750m long-section. Due to natural factors such as weathering and erosion, many walls from Jiankou are severely damaged, so the Jiankou Great Wall is the most precarious section of the Great Wall in Beijing.

The Jiankou Great Wall remains a popular hike amongst visitors with available guided tours by locals, as a scenic route that overlooks the mountains and other sections of the Great Wall.

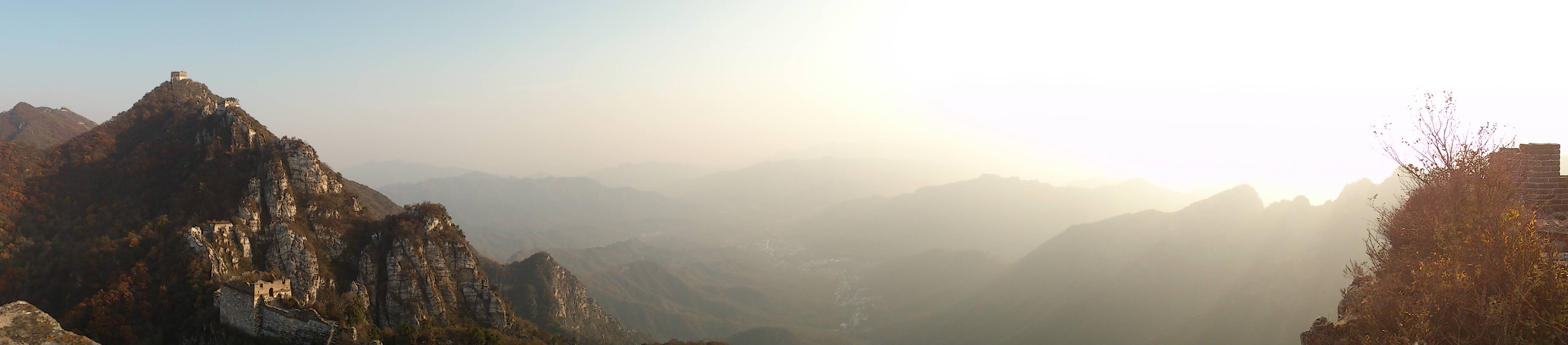
A panoramic view from a watchtower on Jiankou

== See also ==
- List of Beijing landmarks
