= Mutianyu =

Section of the Great Wall of China

Coordinates: 40°26′16.86″N 116°33′42.84″E

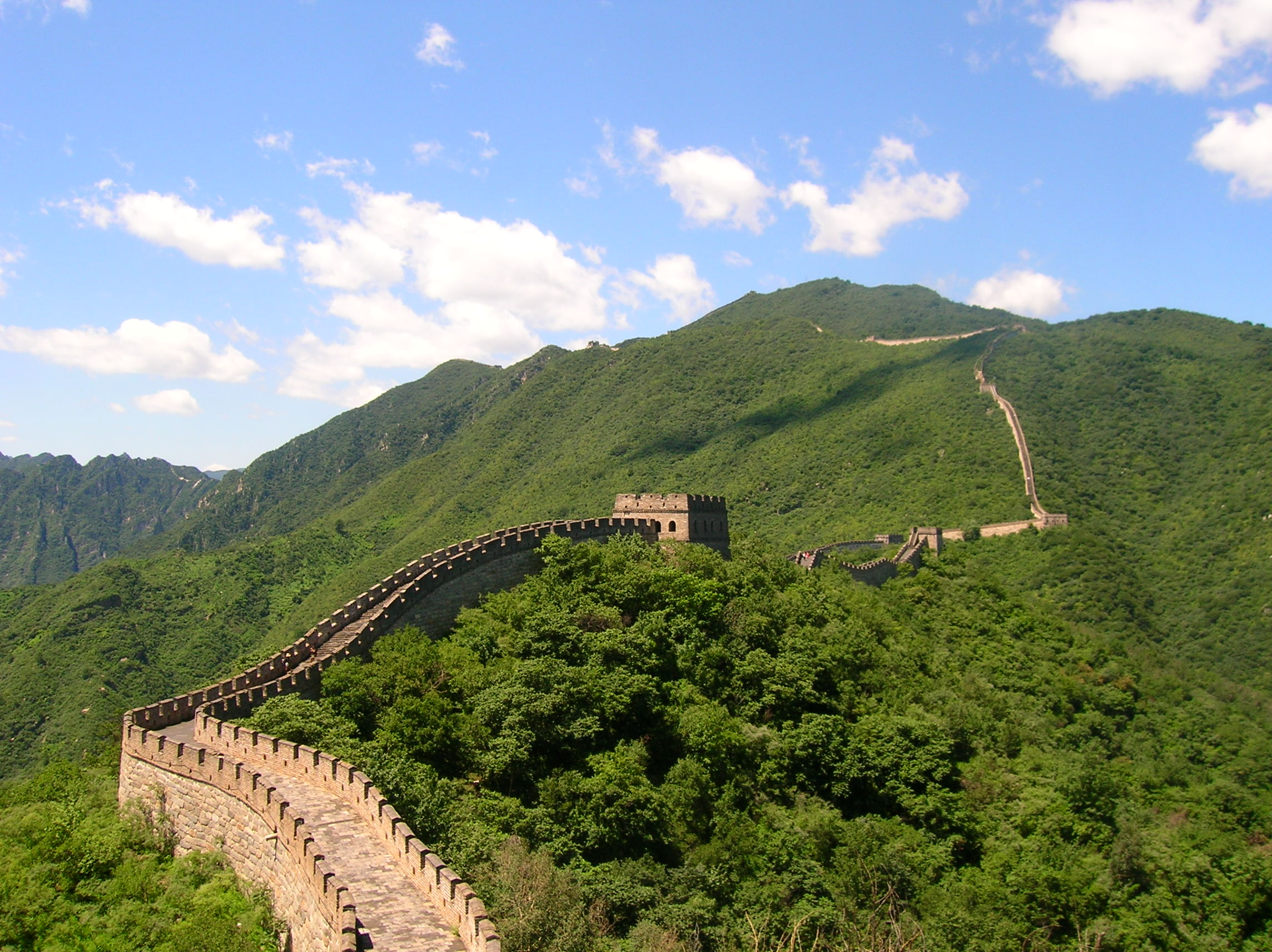
- The Great Wall at Mutianyu
- Chinese: 慕田峪
- Literal meaning: Valley of Admirable Fields; Admiring-Fields Valley
Transcriptions
Standard Mandarin
- Hanyu Pinyin: Mùtiányù
- Wade–Giles: Mu-t'ien-yü
- IPA: [mû.tʰjɛ̌n.ŷ]
Yue: Cantonese
- Jyutping: Mou6-tin4-juk6
Southern Min
- Tâi-lô: Bōo-tiân-iok

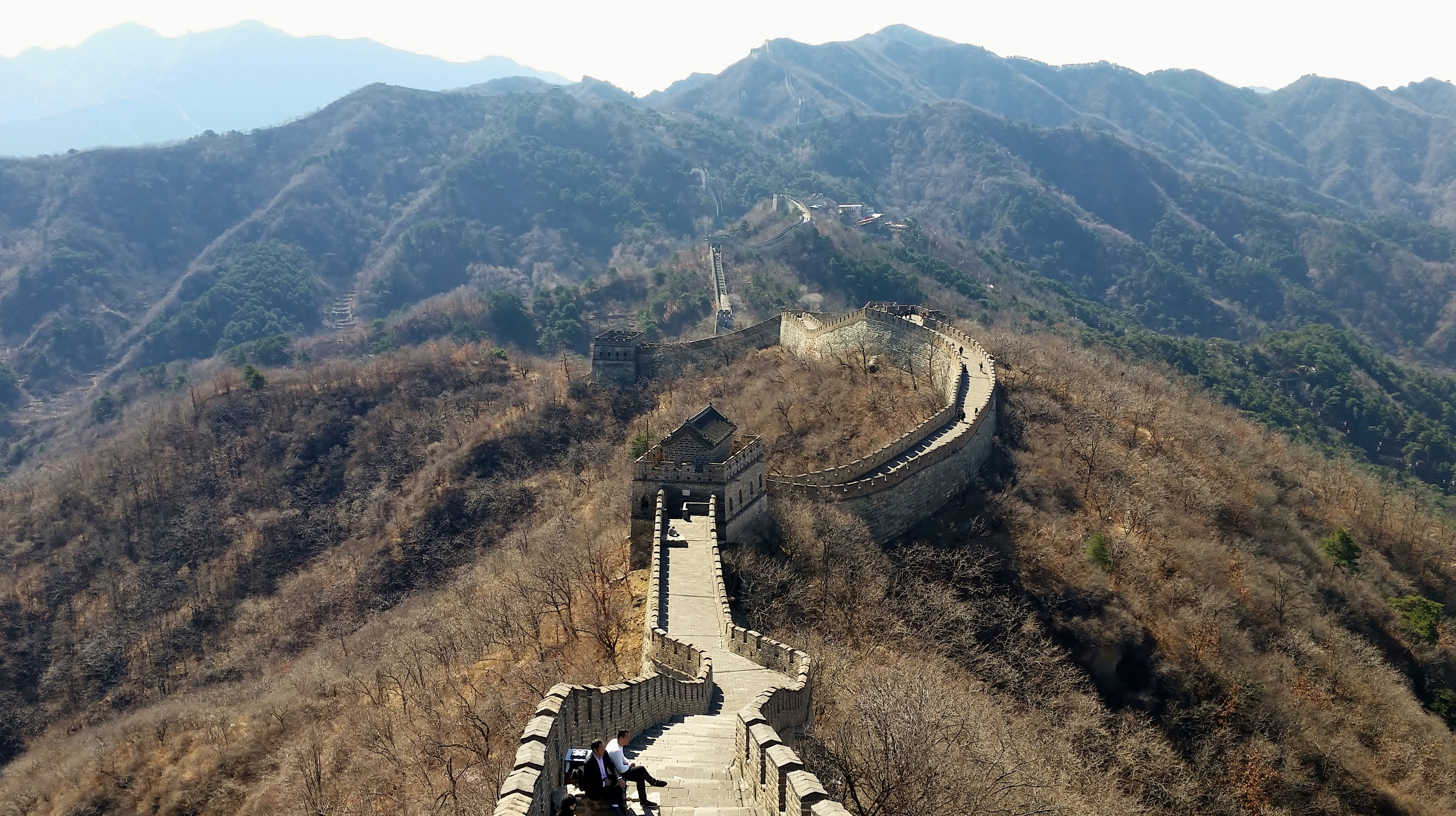
Mutianyu View From Tower 13

Mutianyu is a section of the Great Wall of China located in Huairou District within the city limits of Beijing 70 kilometers (43 mi) northeast of the center of the city. The Mutianyu section of the Great Wall is connected with Jiankou in the west and Lianhuachi in the east. As one of the best-preserved parts of the Great Wall, the Mutianyu section of the Great Wall used to serve as the northern barrier defending the capital and the imperial tombs.

== History ==
First built in the mid-6th century during the Northern Qi, the Mutianyu section is older than the better known Badaling section of the Great Wall. During the Ming dynasty, under the supervision of general Xu Da, construction of the present wall began, building over the previous wall. In 1404, a pass was built in the wall. In 1569, the Mutianyu Great Wall was rebuilt and still today most parts of it are well preserved. The Mutianyu Great Wall has the largest construction scale and best quality among all sections of Great Wall.

In 1568, the Longqing Emperor appointed Qi Jiguang as governor and military administrator of Jizhou, Changping and Baoding to help train the guards in the area. Qi Jiguang helped to maintain the 2000-li section of the Great Wall, which was finished in 1572. Qi Jiguang, upon noticing that the wall had no abutments, suggested the installation of abutments to officials. His suggestion was approved.

In 1983, the State Council of the People's Republic of China approved the restoration of the Mutianyu Great Wall. In 1985, the Huairou District local government established the management of the Mutianyu Great Wall Tourist Area under the leadership of Mutianyu village. The area was opened to select tourists in 1986, and was chosen to be one of Beijing's 16 scenic spots in the same year. In 1987, the Great Wall was selected as a UNESCO World Heritage site. In 1988, the tourist area was opened to all visitors. In 1992, Mutianyu was rated as the best tourist spot in Beijing.

In May 2007, selectmen from the towns of Buckland and Shelburne, Massachusetts, in the United States, inked a memorandum of agreement with officials from Mutianyu making the two the first known "sister villages".

== Description ==
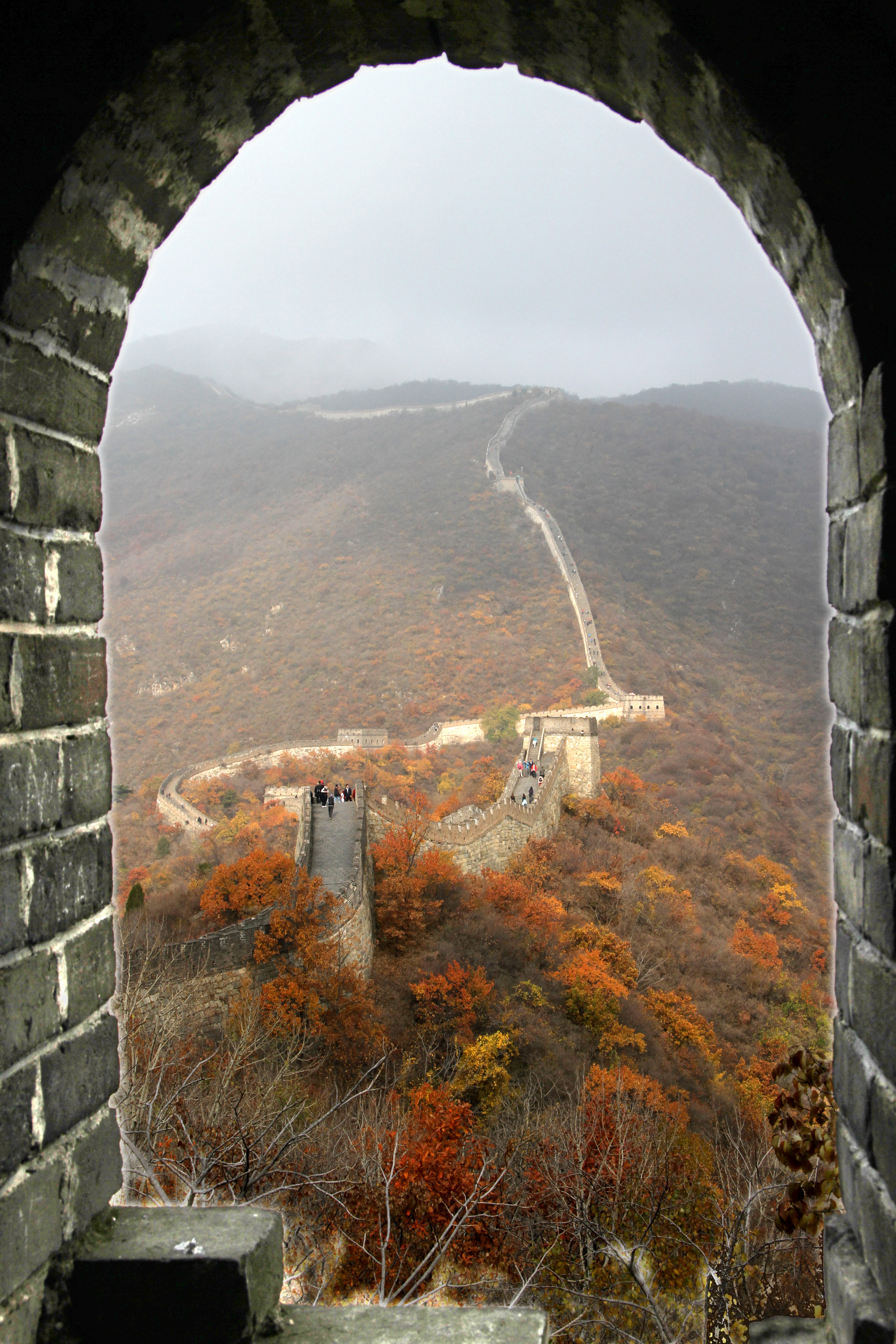
Mutianyu in autumn

Built mainly with granite, the wall is 7 to 8.5 meters (23 to 28 ft) high, and its top is 4 to 5 meters (13 to 16 ft) wide. Compared with other sections of Great Wall, Mutianyu Great Wall possesses unique characteristics in its construction.

- Watchtowers are densely placed along this section of the Great Wall – 22 watchtowers on this 2,250-meter (7,380 ft) stretch.
- Both the outer and inner parapets are crenelated with merlons, so that archers could fire protected on both sides – a feature very rare on other parts of the Great Wall.
- The Mutianyu Pass consists of three watchtowers, one big tower in the center flanked by two smaller towers on both sides. Standing on the same terrace, the three watchtowers are connected to each other inside and compose a rarely seen structure among all sections of Great Wall. Two of the side watchtowers has two graffiti canvases which are regularly replaced.

Besides, this section of Great Wall is surrounded by woodland and streams. The forest coverage rate is over 90 percent.

Today, this section of wall is open to visitors. There are three methods of ascent and four methods of descent to choose from. Besides utilizing 4000+ steps, visitors may also choose between a two-rider chairlift or four-rider gondola lift up from the foothills to the level of the wall, which runs along the ridges above. These lifts may also be used to descend. Another feature of the wall at Mutianyu is an alternate method of descent by single-rider personal wheeled toboggan. This allows single riders to descend from the wall to the valley on a winding metal track.

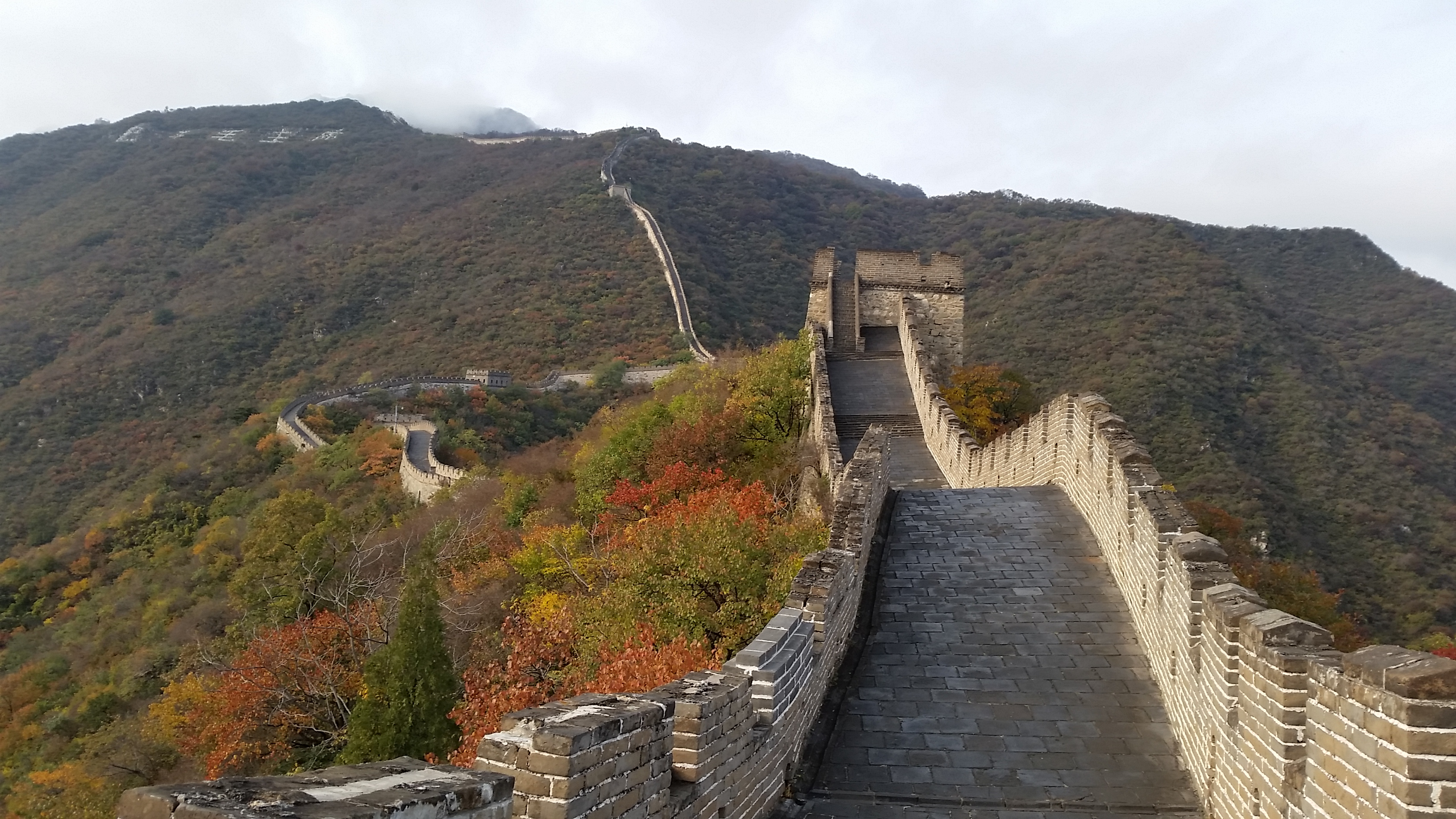
Great Wall at Mutianyu 2015

Adjacent to the Mutianyu wall is its namesake village, which has been hailed by the Chinese government as a model village because of its rebirth largely thanks to tourism and glassware industries. Mutianyu Village is twinned with the village of Shelburne Falls in the U.S. state of Massachusetts.

Due to its proximity to the Jiankou Great Wall, the Mutianyu-Jiankou trail is becoming one of the most popular Great Wall hikes. As Jiankou is in a state of disrepair, this hike combines the preserved condition of Jiankou's Great Wall with the classic restorative brickwork of Mutianyu.

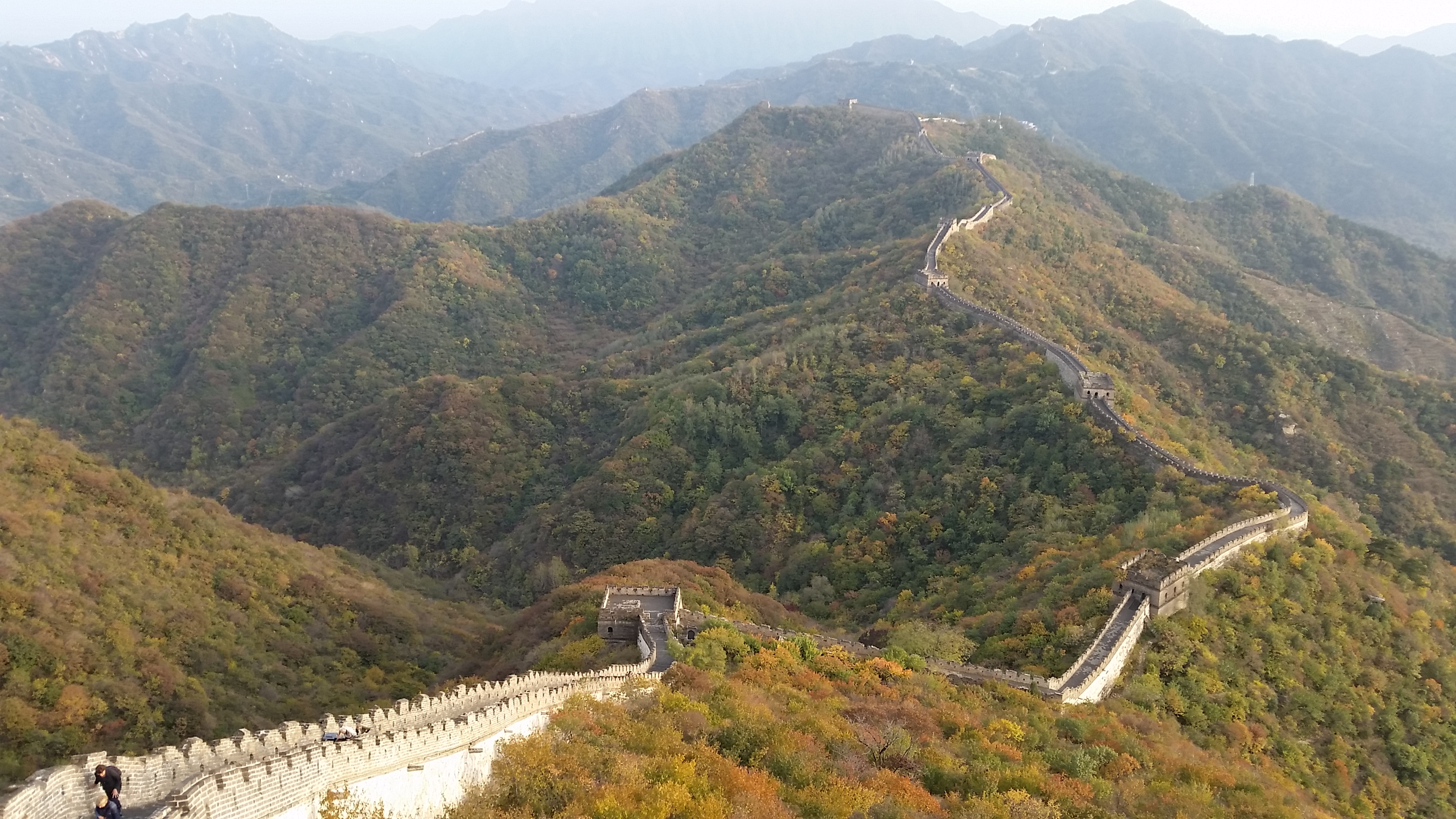
Great wall other view at Mutianyu 2015
