= List of administrative divisions of Beijing =

Municipality of Beijing
- Municipality
- Seat: Dongcheng District & Tongzhou District

County level divisions
- Districts: 16

Township level divisions
- Towns / areas^{*}: 39
- Townships / areas^{*}: 146
- Subdistricts: 137

Villages level divisions
- Communities: 3,060
- Administrative villages: 3,931

This is a list of administrative divisions of Beijing. Beijing is one of the four direct-administered municipalities of the People's Republic of China, and is divided into 16 municipal districts.

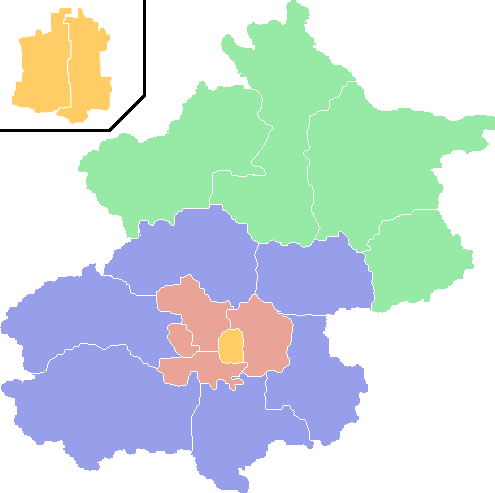

== Administrative divisions ==
All of these administrative divisions are explained in greater detail at Administrative divisions of the People's Republic of China. This chart lists only county-level divisions of Beijing.

Name	Chinese	Hanyu Pinyin	Division code		Area (km^{2})	Population (2010 census)	Density (/km^{2})
Dongcheng District (City seat)	东城区	Dōngchéng Qū	110101	DCQ	40.6	919,000	22,635
Xicheng District	西城区	Xīchéng Qū	110102	XCQ	46.5	1,243,000	26,731
Chaoyang District	朝阳区	Cháoyáng Qū	110105	CYQ	470.8	3,545,000	7,530
Fengtai District	丰台区	Fēngtái Qū	110106	FTQ	304.2	2,112,000	6,943
Shijingshan District	石景山区	Shíjǐngshān Qū	110107	SJS	89.8	616,000	6,860
Haidian District	海淀区	Hǎidiàn Qū	110108	HDN	426.0	3,281,000	7,702
Mentougou District	门头沟区	Méntóugōu Qū	110109	MTG	1,331.3	290,000	218
Fangshan District	房山区	Fángshān Qū	110111	FSQ	1,866.7	945,000	506
Tongzhou District (City seat)	通州区	Tōngzhōu Qū	110112	TZQ	870.0	1,184,000	1,361
Shunyi District	顺义区	Shùnyì Qū	110113	SYI	980.0	877,000	895
Changping District	昌平区	Chāngpíng Qū	110114	CHP	1,430.0	1,661,000	1,162
Daxing District	大兴区	Dàxīng Qū	110115	DXU	1,012.0	1,365,000	1,349
Huairou District	怀柔区	Huáiróu Qū	110116	HRO	2,557.3	373,000	146
Pinggu District	平谷区	Pínggǔ Qū	110117	PGU	1,075.0	416,000	387
Miyun District	密云区	Mìyún Qū	110118	MYI	2,335.6	468,000	200
Yanqing District	延庆区	Yánqìng Qū	110119	YQY	1,980.0	317,000	160

== Recent changes in administrative divisions ==
Date	Before	After	Note	Reference
1974-08-01	parts of Fangshan County	Petrochemical District Office	established	
1980-10-20	parts of Fangshan County	Yanshan District	established	
1980-10-20	parts of Petrochemical District Office	Yanshan District	merged into	
1986-11-11	Fangshan County	Fangshan District	reorganized	
1986-11-11	Yanshan District	Fangshan District	merged into	
1997-04-29	Tong County	Tongzhou District	reorganized	State Council [1997]30
1998-03-03	Shunyi County	Shunyi District	reorganized	State Council [1998]17
1999-09-16	Changping County	Changping District	reorganized	State Council [1999]112
2001-01-09	Daxing County	Daxing District	reorganized	State Council [2001]4
2001-12-30	Huairou County	Huairou District	reorganized	State Council [2001]175
2001-12-30	Pinggu County	Pinggu District	reorganized	State Council [2001]176
2010-06-28	Xuanwu District	Xicheng District	merged into	State Council [2010]55
2010-06-28	Chongwen District	Dongcheng District	merged into	State Council [2010]55
2015-10-13	Miyun County	Miyun District	reorganized	State Council [2015]182
2015-10-13	Yanqing County	Yanqing District	reorganized	State Council [2015]182

== Historical divisions ==
=== ROC (1911–1949) ===
County / City	Present division
Beiping City 北平市	Dongcheng, Xicheng, Chaoyang, Haidian
Tong County, Hebei 通縣	Tongzhou
Daxing County, Hebei 大興縣	Daxing
Wanping County, Hebei 宛平縣	Mentougou, Fengtai, Shijingshan
Liangxiang County, Hebei 良鄉縣	Fangshan
Huairou County, Hebei 懷柔縣	Huairou
Shunyi County, Hebei 順義縣	Shunyi
Changping County, Hebei 昌平縣	Changping
Pinggu County, Hebei 平谷縣	Pinggu
Miyun County, Hebei 密雲縣	Miyun
Yanqing County, Qahar 延慶縣	Yanqing
