= Yangsong =

Yangsong Town 杨宋镇
- Town
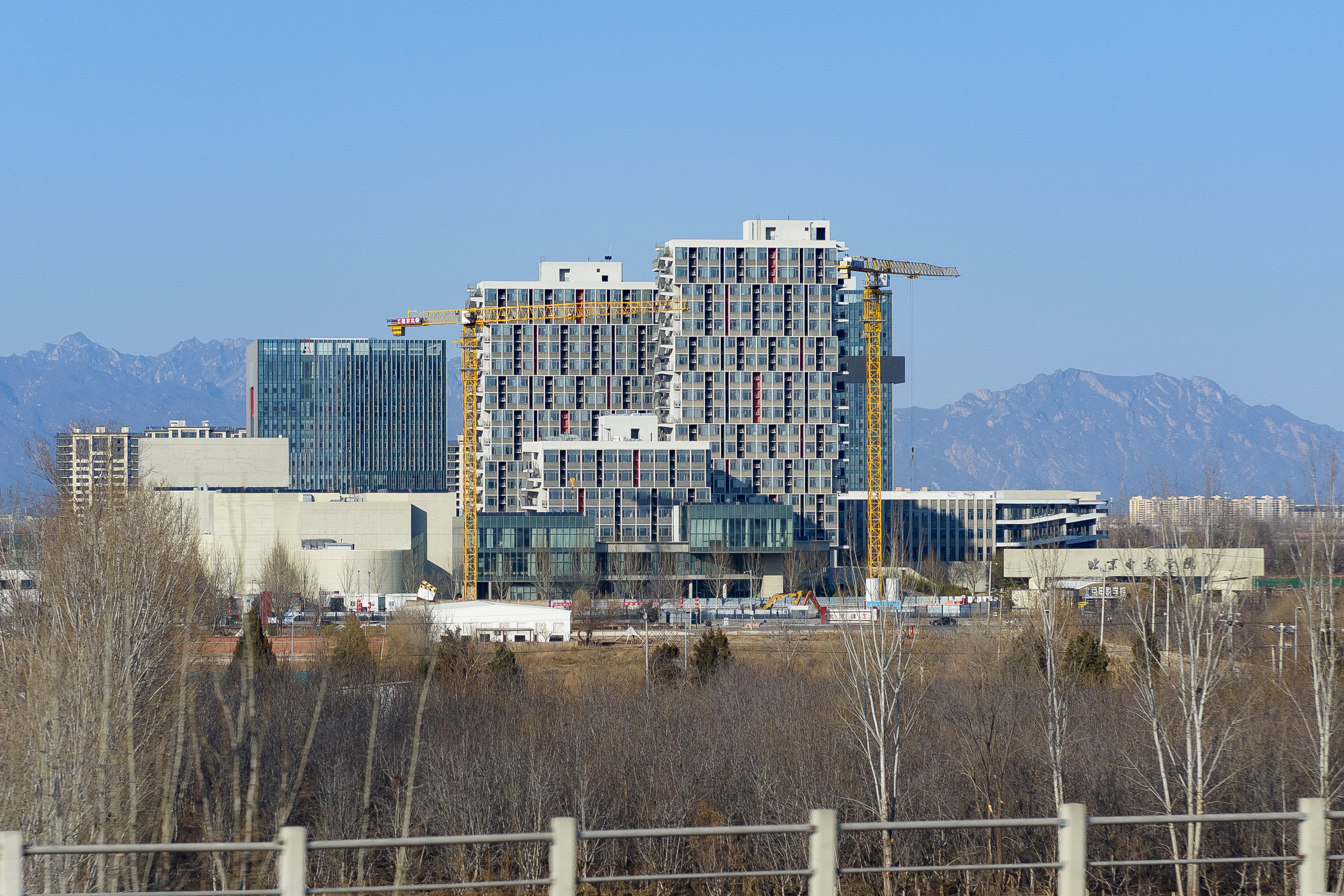
- Beijing Film Academy Huairou Campus, 2026

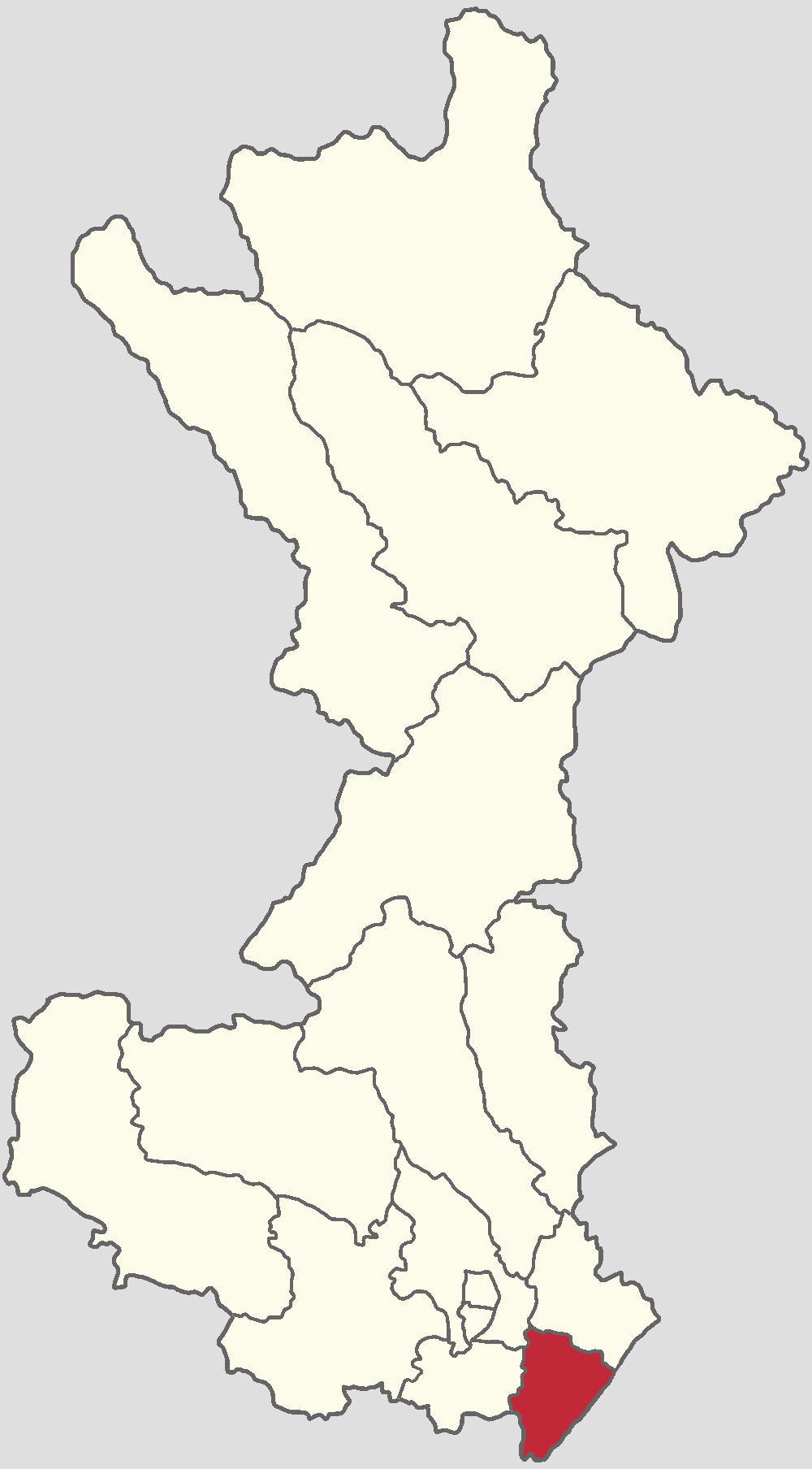
- Location in Huairou District

- Location within Beijing Location within China
- Coordinates: 40°17′41″N 116°40′44″E
- Country: China
- Municipality: Beijing
- District: Huairou
- Village-level Divisions: 1 community 15 villages

Area
  - Total: 31.15 km^{2} (12.03 sq mi)
- Elevation: 42 m (138 ft)

Population (2020)
  - Total: 31,270
  - Density: 1,004/km^{2} (2,600/sq mi)
- Time zone: UTC+8 (China Standard)
- Postal code: 101400
- Area code: 010

Yangsong Town (Chinese: 杨宋镇; pinyin: Yángsòng Zhèn), is a town on southeastern Huairou District, Beijing, China. It borders Beifang Town to its north, Mulin and Beixiaoying Towns to its southeast, as well as Niulanshan and Miaocheng Towns to its southwest. As of 2020, its total population was 31,270.

== History ==
Timetable of Yangsong's Town
Time	Status	Part of
Ming and Qing dynasty	Mulin Village	Huairou County, Shuntian Prefecture
1912–1940	1st District	Huairou County, Capital Area
1940–1949	3rd District	Huairou County, Capital Area
1949–1958	3rd District	Huairou County, Hebei
1958–1959	Yangsong Township, within Dongfeng people's Commune	Huairou County, Beijing
1959–1960	Chengguan People's Commune	Huairou County, Beijing
1960–1983	Yangsongzhuang People's Commune	Huairou County, Beijing
1983–1990	Yangsongzhuang Township	Huairou County, Beijing
1990–2001	Yangsong Town	Huairou County, Beijing
2001–present	Yangsong Town	Huairou District, Beijing

== Administrative divisions ==
As of the year 2021, Yangsong Town consisted of 16 subdivisions, where one was a community, and 15 were villages:

Subdivision names	Name transliterations	Type
凤翔	Fengxiang	Community
杨宋庄	Yangsongzhuang	Village
仙台	Xiantai	Village
西树行	Xishuhang	Village
北年丰	Bei Nianfeng	Village
南年丰	Nan Nianfeng	Village
四季屯	Sijitun	Village
解村	Xiecun	Village
耿辛庄	Gengxinzhuang	Village
张各庄满族	Zhanggezhuang Manzu	Village
花园	Huayuan	Village
郭庄	Guozhuang	Village
安乐庄	Anlezhuang	Village
张自口	Zhangzikou	Village
太平庄满族	Taipingzhuang Manzu	Village
梭草	Suocao	Village

== Gallery ==
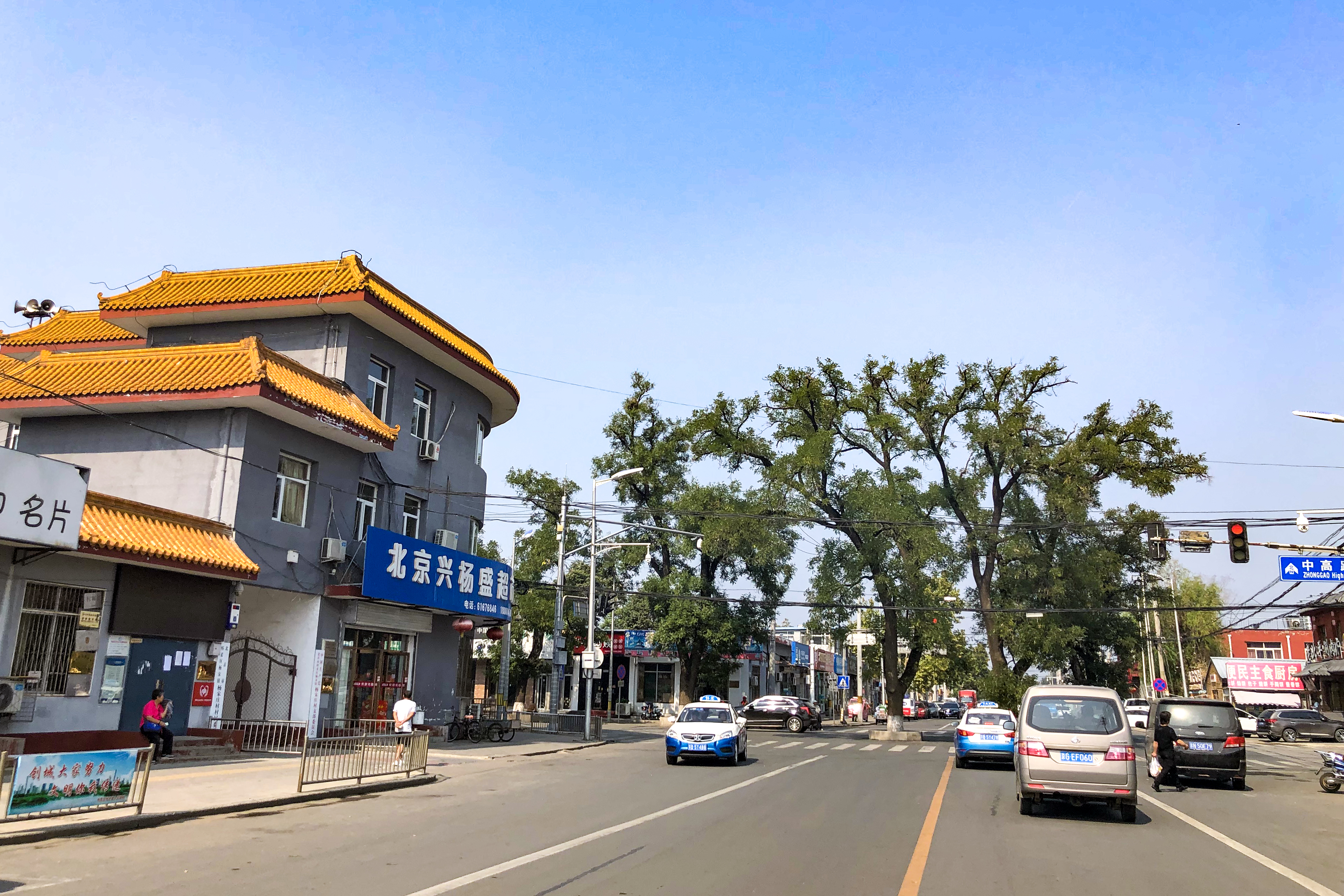
Zhonggao Road within the town, 2019

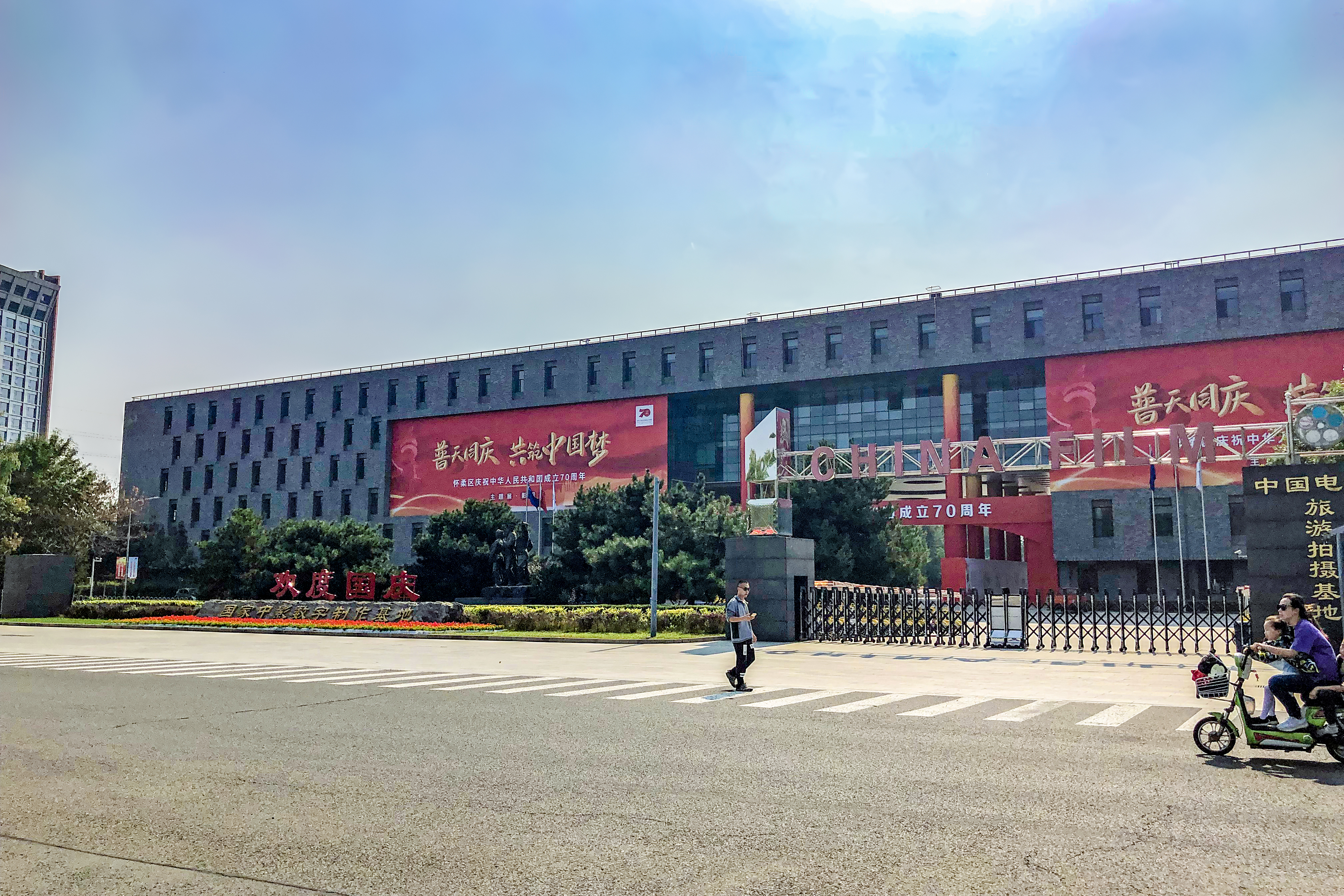
China Film Group Studio, 2019

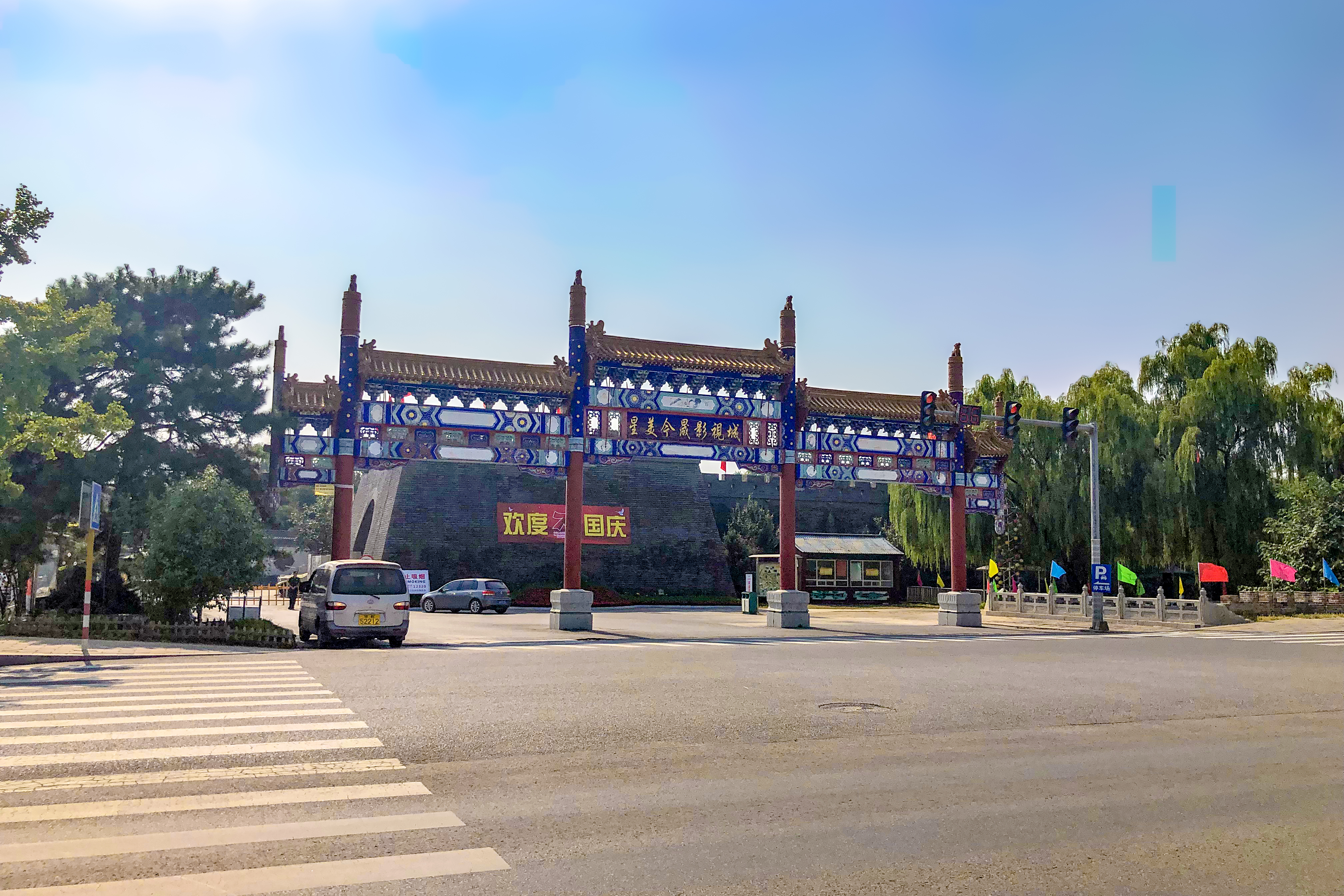
Stellar Megamedia Jinsheng Studio at the west of the town, 2019

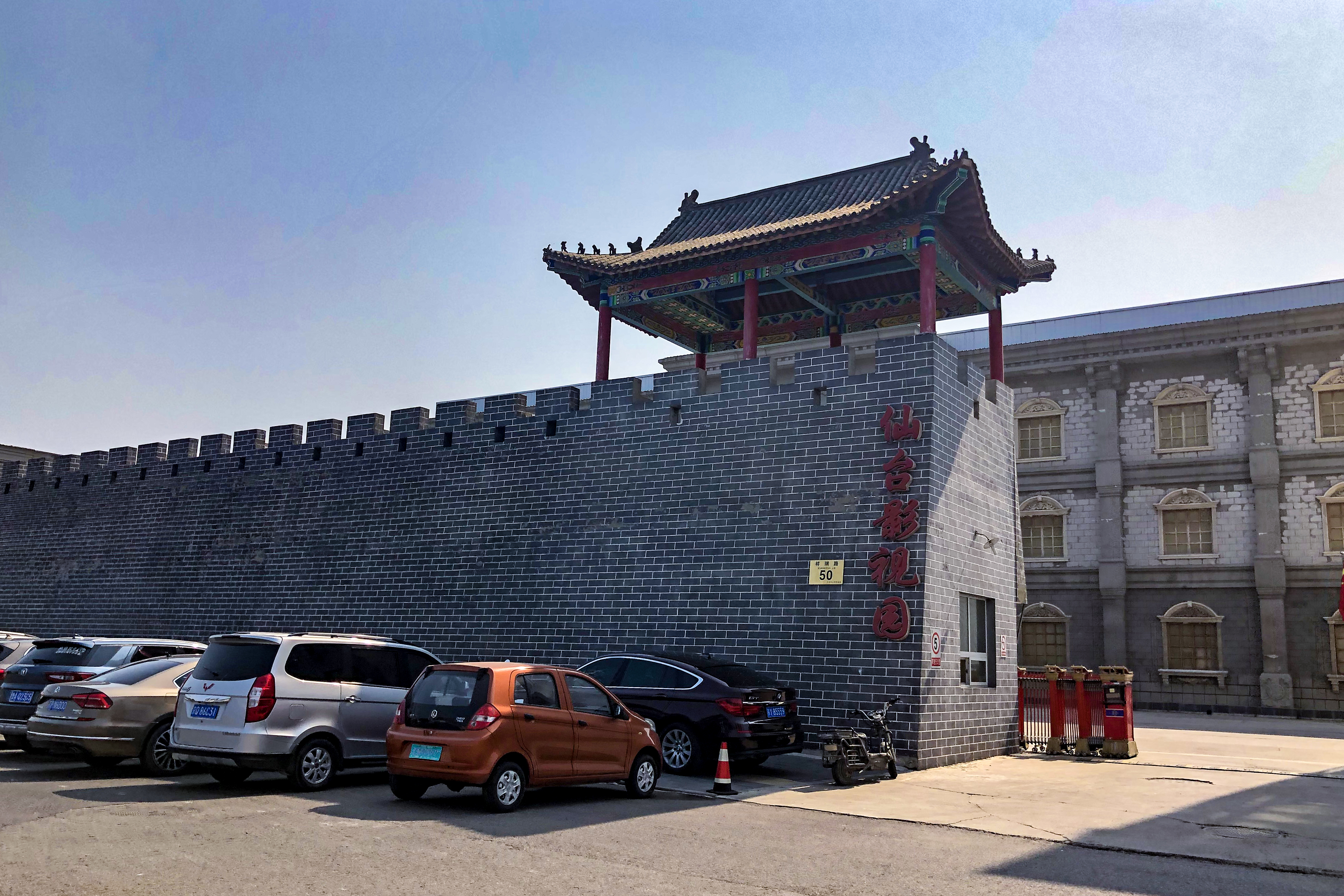
Xiantain Film Studio, 2019

== See also ==
- List of township-level divisions of Beijing
