= Qiaozi =

Qiaozi Town 桥梓镇
- Town
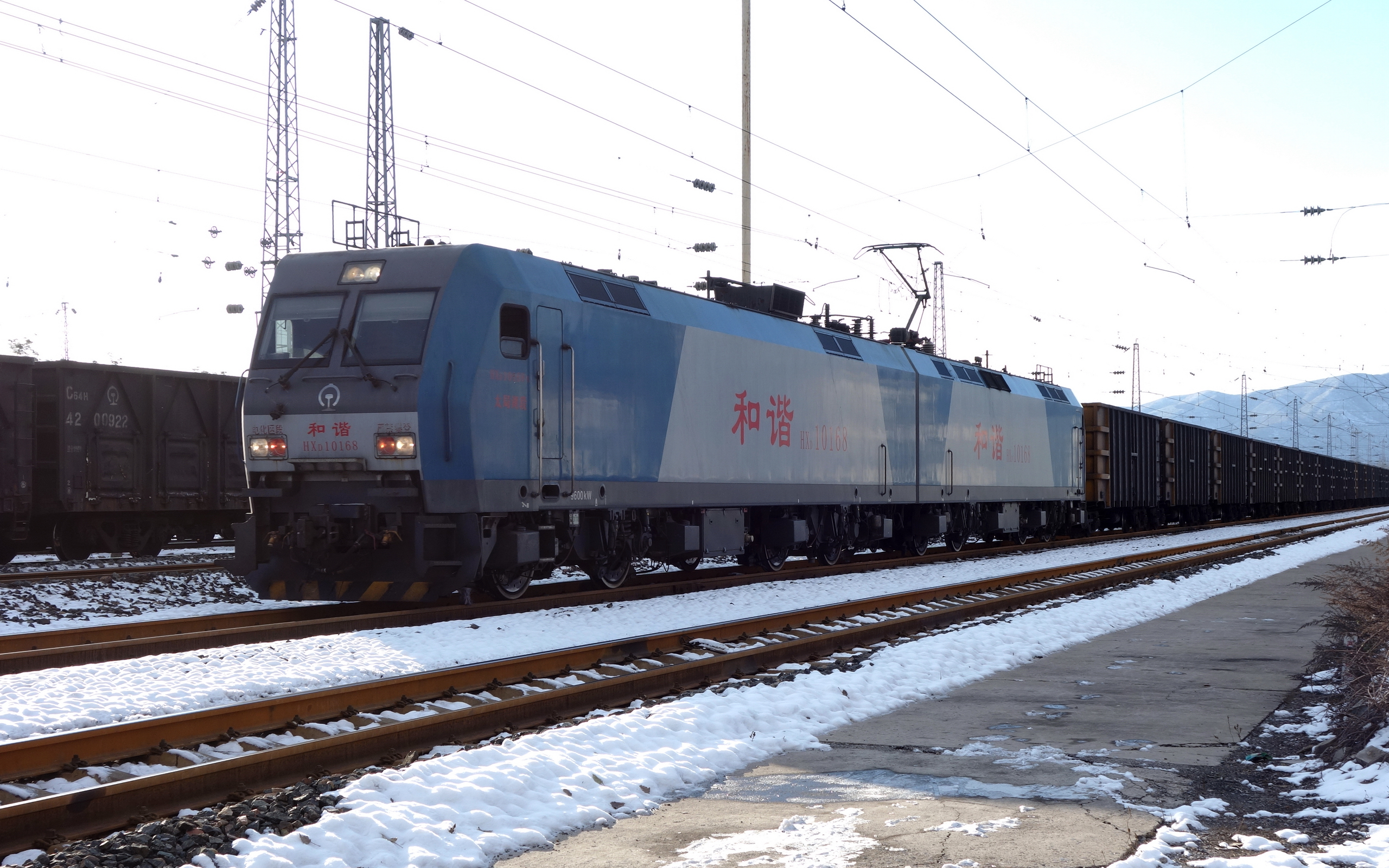
- Cargo train passing through Chawu Railway Station of Datong–Qinhuangdao railway

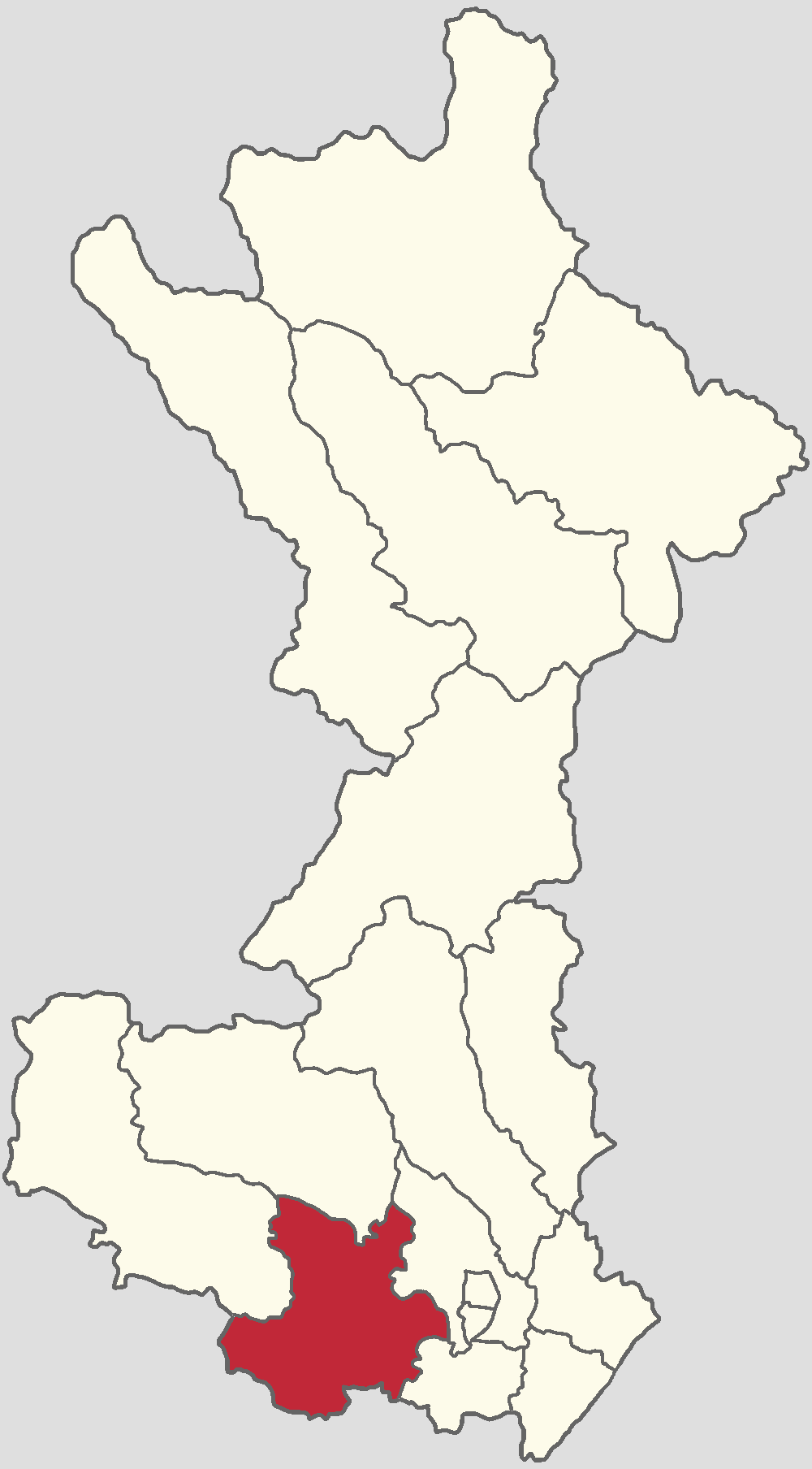
- Location within Huairou District

- Location within Beijing Location within China
- Coordinates: 40°17′21″N 116°34′06″E
- Country: China
- Municipality: Beijing
- District: Huairou
- Village-level Divisions: 1 community 24 villages

Area
  - Total: 110.6 km^{2} (42.7 sq mi)
- Elevation: 64 m (210 ft)

Population (2020)
  - Total: 25,076
  - Density: 226.7/km^{2} (587.2/sq mi)
- Time zone: UTC+8 (China Standard)
- Postal code: 101402
- Area code: 010

Qiaozi Town (simplified Chinese: 桥梓镇; traditional Chinese: 橋梓鎮; pinyin: Qiáozǐ Zhèn), is a town in southern Huairou District, Beijing, China. It shares border with Bohai Town in the north, Hauirou and Miaocheng Towns in the east, Beishicao and Xingshou Towns in the south, as well as Yanshou and Jiuduhe Towns in the west. Its population was 25,076 as of 2020.

== History ==
Timeline of Qiaozi Town
Time	Status	Within
1948 – 1958		Huairou County, Hebei
1958 – 1961	Qiaozi People's Commune	Huairou County, Beijing
1961 – 1983	Chawu People's Commune; Beizhai People's Commune	Huairou County, Beijing
1983 – 1990	Chawu Township; Beizhai Township	Huairou County, Beijing
1990 – 1998	Qiaozi Town; Beizhai Township	Huairou County, Beijing
1998 – 2001	Qiaozi Town	Huairou County, Beijing
2001–present	Qiaozi Town	Huairou District, Beijing

== Administrative divisions ==
As of 2021, Qiaozi Town administers 25 subdivisions, of which 1 is a community and 24 are villages:

Administrative division code	Subdivision names	Name transliteration	Type
110116105001	茶坞铁路	Chawu Tielu	Community
110116105201	前桥梓	Qian Qiaozi	Village
110116105202	后桥梓	Hou Qiaozi	Village
110116105203	山立庄	Shanlizhuang	Village
110116105204	东茶坞	Dong Chawu	Village
110116105205	西茶坞	Xi Chawu	Village
110116105206	前茶坞	Qian Chawu	Village
110116105207	平义分	Pingyifen	Village
110116105208	沙峪口	Shayukou	Village
110116105209	新王峪	Xin Wangyu	Village
110116105210	上王峪	Shang Wangyu	Village
110116105211	苏峪口	Suyukou	Village
110116105212	岐庄	Qizhuang	Village
110116105213	东凤山	Dongfengshan	Village
110116105214	红林	Honglin	Village
110116105215	口头	Koutou	Village
110116105216	凯甲庄	Kaijiazhuang	Village
110116105217	北宅	Beizhai	Village
110116105218	峪口	Yukou	Village
110116105219	峪沟	Yugou	Village
110116105220	一渡河	Yiduhe	Village
110116105221	后辛庄	Hou Xinzhuang	Village
110116105222	前辛庄	Qian Xinzhuang	Village
110116105223	秦家东庄	Qinjia Dongzhuang	Village
110116105224	杨家东庄	Yangjia Dongzhuang	Village

== Gallery ==
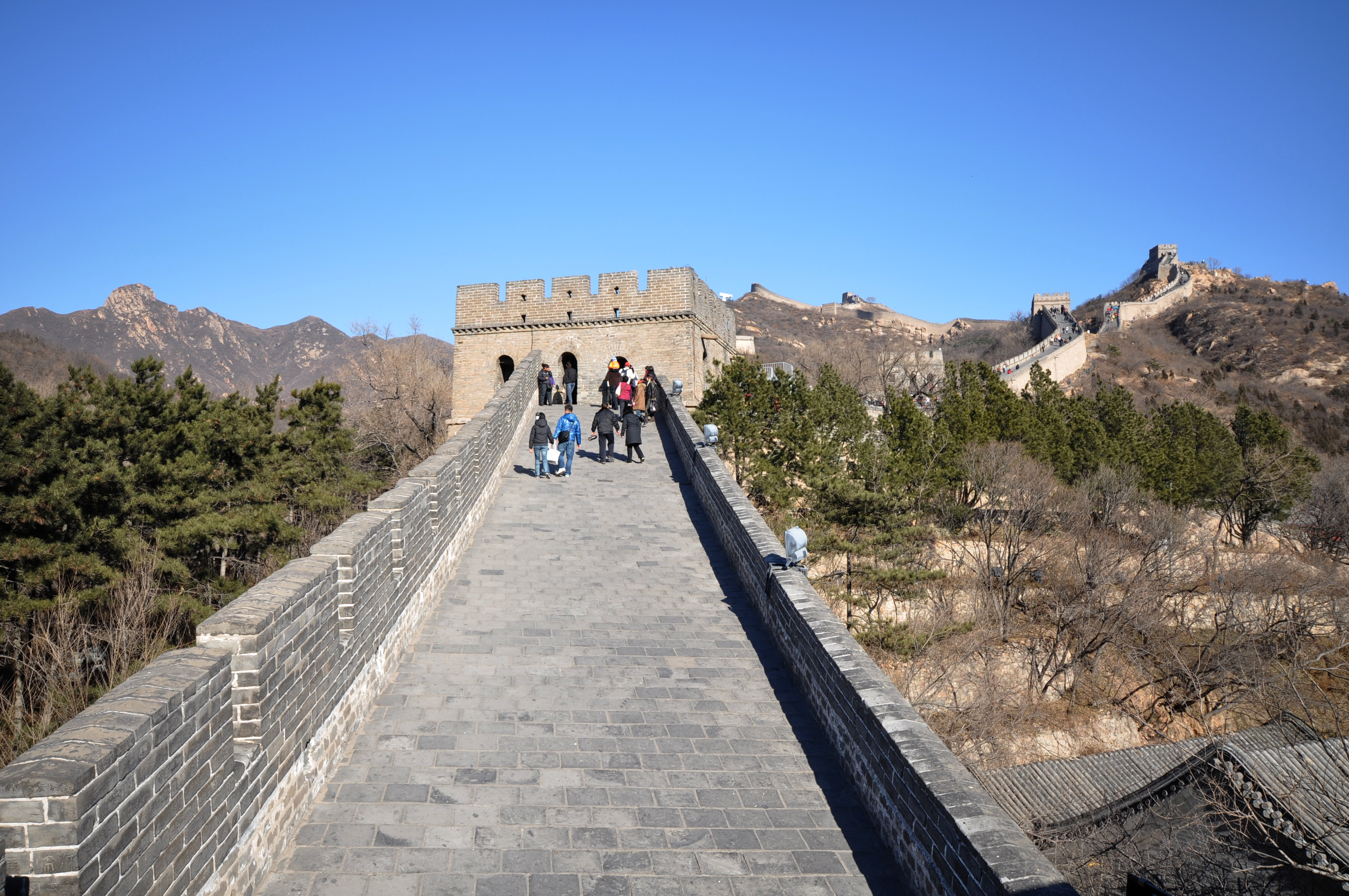
Part of the Great Wall around Shang Wangyu Village, 2010

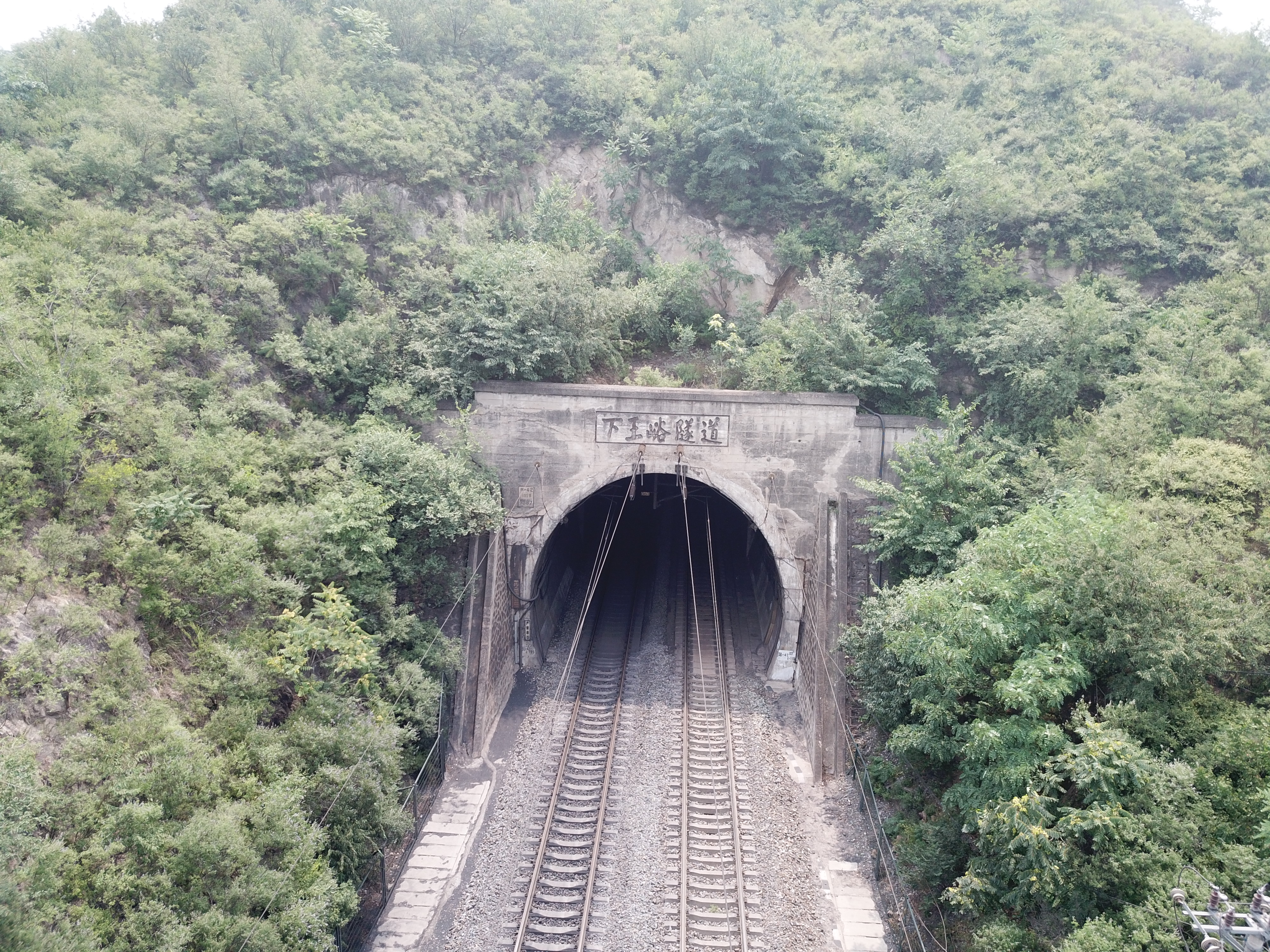
Xia Wangyu Tunnel, 2018

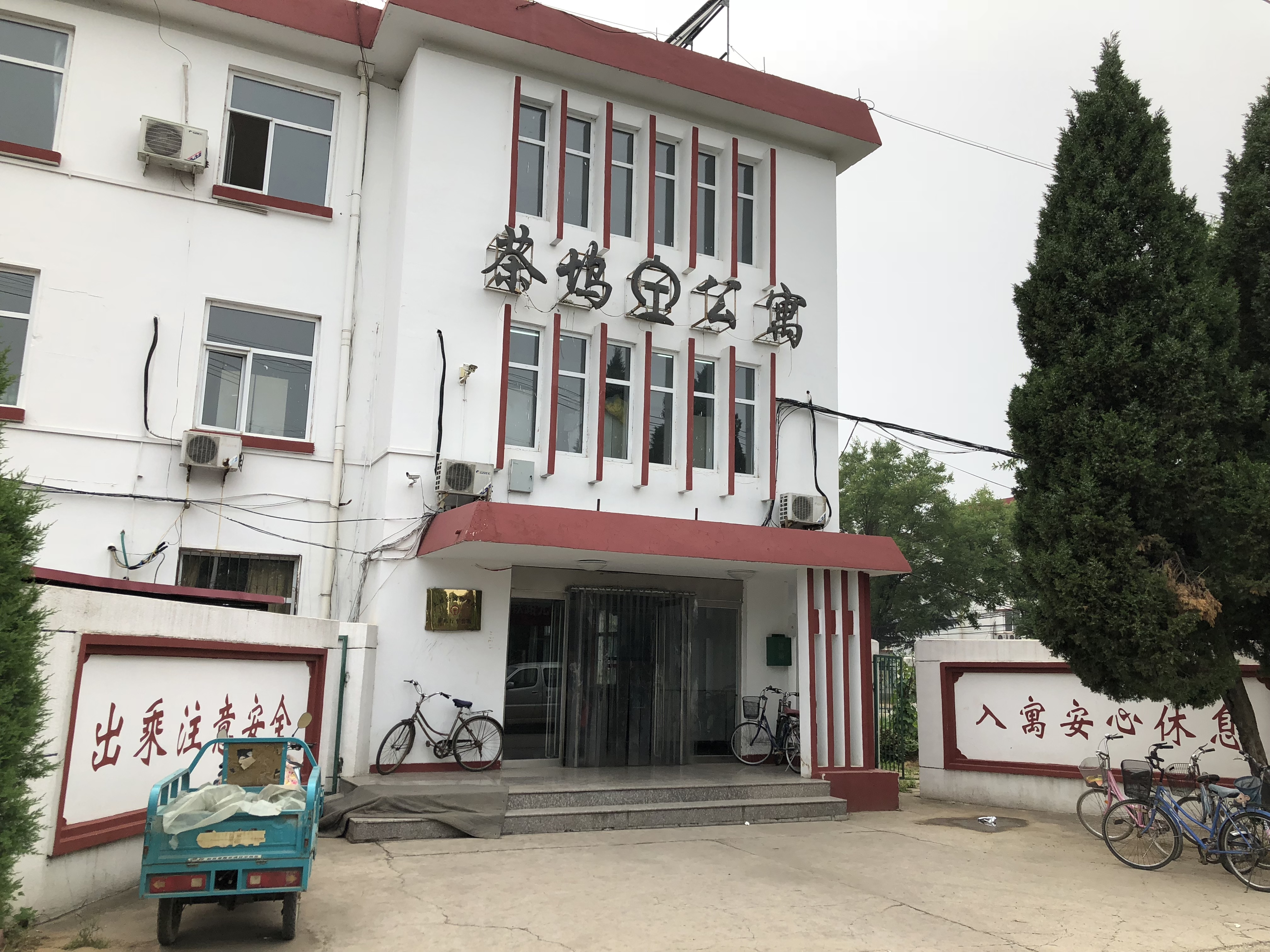
Chawu Apartment, 2018

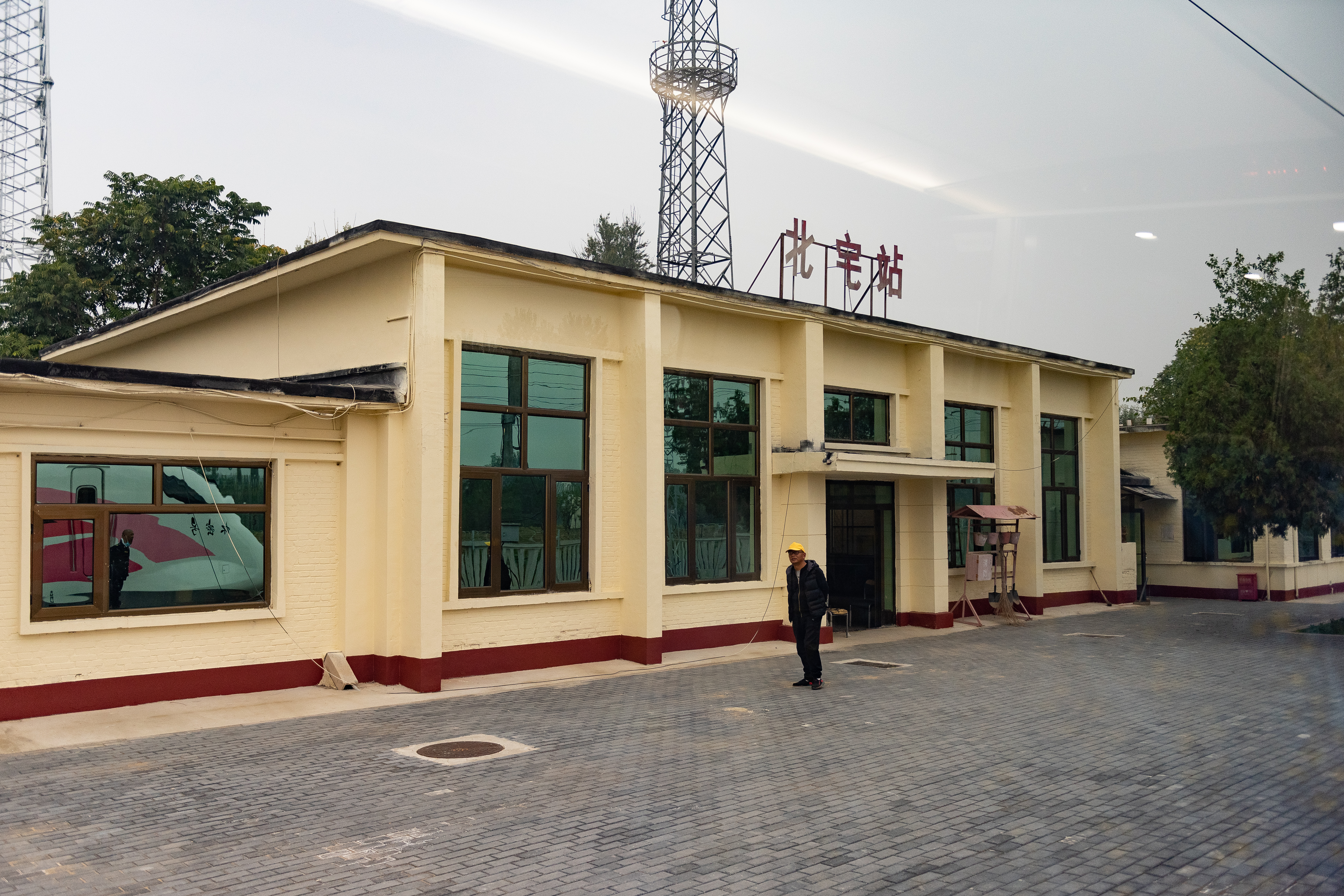
Beizhai Railway Station, 2020

== See also ==
- List of township-level divisions of Beijing
