= Qincheng =

Qincheng may refer to:

- Qincheng Village, village in Xingshou, Changping District, Beijing, China
- Qincheng Prison, maximum-security prison in Qincheng Village, Xingshou, Changping District, Beijing, China
- Qincheng, Nanfeng County, town in Jiangxi, China

== See also ==
- Qingcheng (disambiguation)
