= Beifang =

Beifang Town 北房镇
- Town
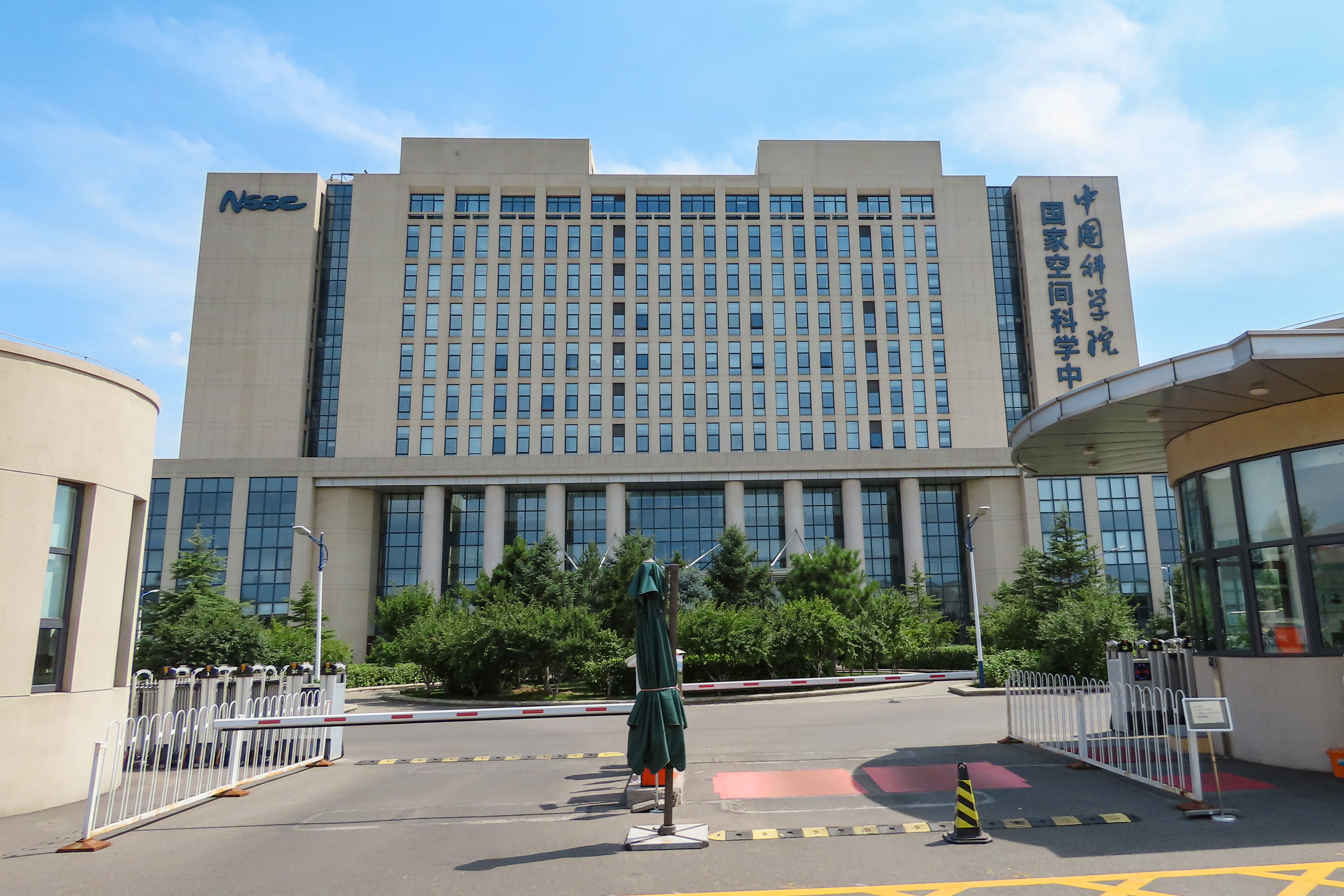
- National Space Science Center, 2020

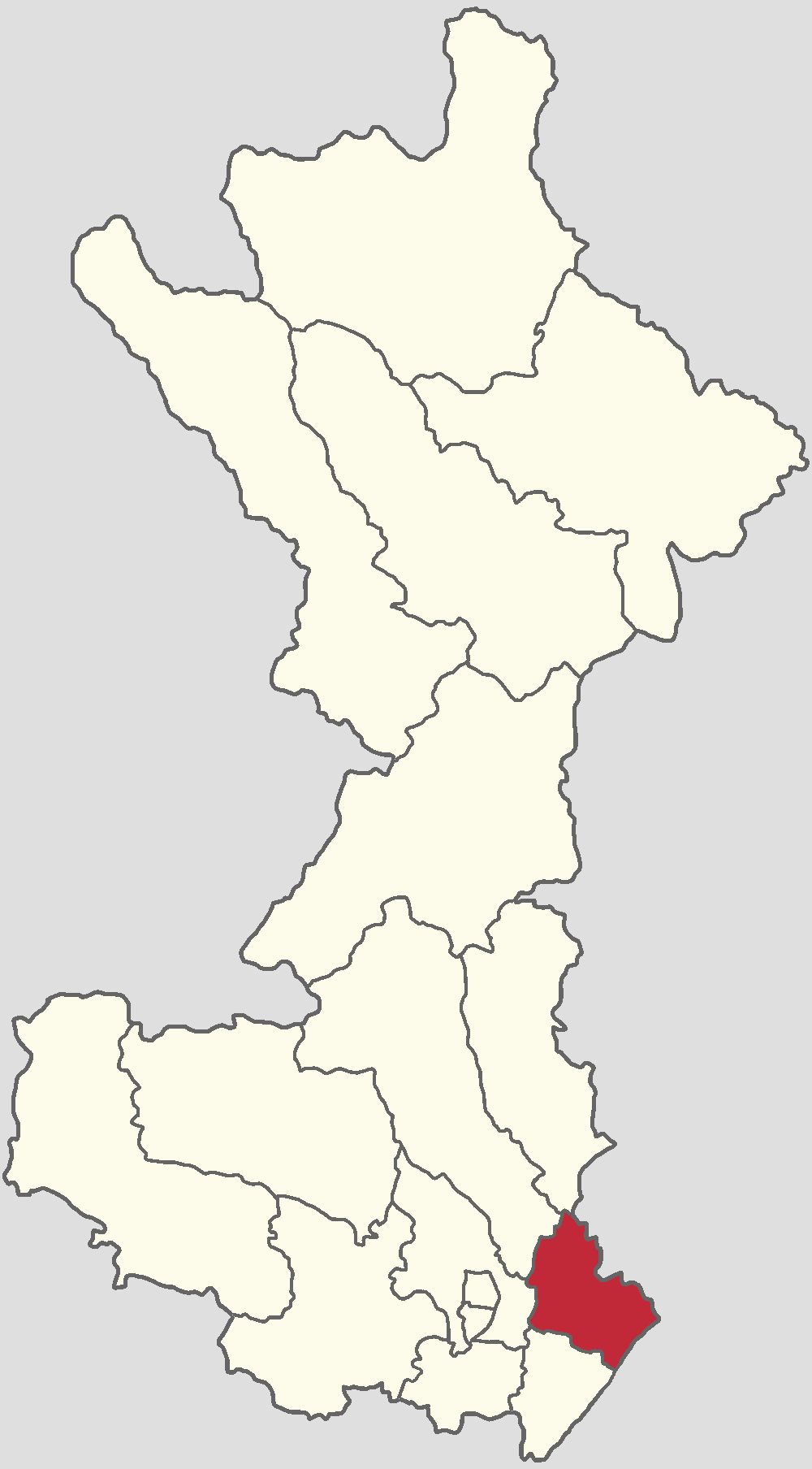
- Location in Huairou District

- Location within Beijing Location within China
- Coordinates: 40°19′31″N 116°41′48″E
- Country: China
- Municipality: Beijing
- District: Huairou
- Village-level Divisions: 2 communities 16 villages

Area
  - Total: 37.3 km^{2} (14.4 sq mi)
- Elevation: 47 m (154 ft)

Population (2020)
  - Total: 33,712
  - Density: 904/km^{2} (2,340/sq mi)
- Time zone: UTC+8 (China Standard)
- Postal code: 101400
- Area code: 010

Beifang Town (simplified Chinese: 北房镇; traditional Chinese: 北房鎮; pinyin: Běifáng Zhèn) is a town located on the southeastern portion of Huairou District, Beijing, China. It shares border with Huaibei and Xitiangezhuang Towns to its north, Shilibao and Henanzhai Towns to its east, Mulin and Yangsong Towns to its south, and Huairou Town to its west. Its population was 33,712 as of 2020. Its name Beifang literally means "North House".

== History ==
Timeline of Beifang's History
Time	Status	Part of
Ming dynasty	Fangjiali	Huairou County, Shuntian Prefecture
Qing dynasty	Fangjiali	Huairou County, Shuntian Prefecture
Qing dynasty		Miyun County, Shuntian Prefecture
1912 – 1939	Fangjiali, 5th District	Huairou County, Capoital Area
1939 – 1949	1st District	Huairou County, Capoital Area
1949 – 1958	1st District	Huairou County, Hebei
1958 – 1960	Beifang Management Area, Dongfeng People's Commune	Huairou County, Beijing
1960 – 1961	Wanghua People's Commune	Huairou County, Beijing
1961 – 1983	Beifang People's Commune	Huairou County, Beijing
1983 – 1990	Beifang Township	Huairou County, Beijing
1990 – 2001	Beifang Town	Huairou County, Beijing
2001–present	Beifang Town	Huairou District, Beijing

== Administrative divisions ==
As of the year 2021, Beifang Town consisted of 18 subdivisions — 2 communities and 16 villages:

Subdivision names	Name transliterations	Type
幸福东园	Xingfu Dongyuan	Community
裕华园	Yuhuayuan	Community
宰相庄	Zaixiangzhuang	Village
安各庄	Angehzuang	Village
北房	Beifang	Village
南房	Nanfang	Village
黄吉营	Hunangjiying	Village
驸马庄	Fumazhuang	Village
梨园庄	Liyuanzhuang	Village
郑家庄	Zhengjiazhuang	Village
韦里	Weili	Village
小罗山	Xiao Luoshan	Village
大罗山	Da Luoshan	Village
小辛庄	Xiaoxinzhuang	Village
大周各庄	Da Zhougezhuang	Village
小周各庄	Xioa Zhougezhuang	Village
新房子	Xinfangzi	Village
胜利	Shengli	Village

== See also ==
- List of township-level divisions of Beijing
