= Miaocheng =

Miaocheng Town 庙城地区
- Town
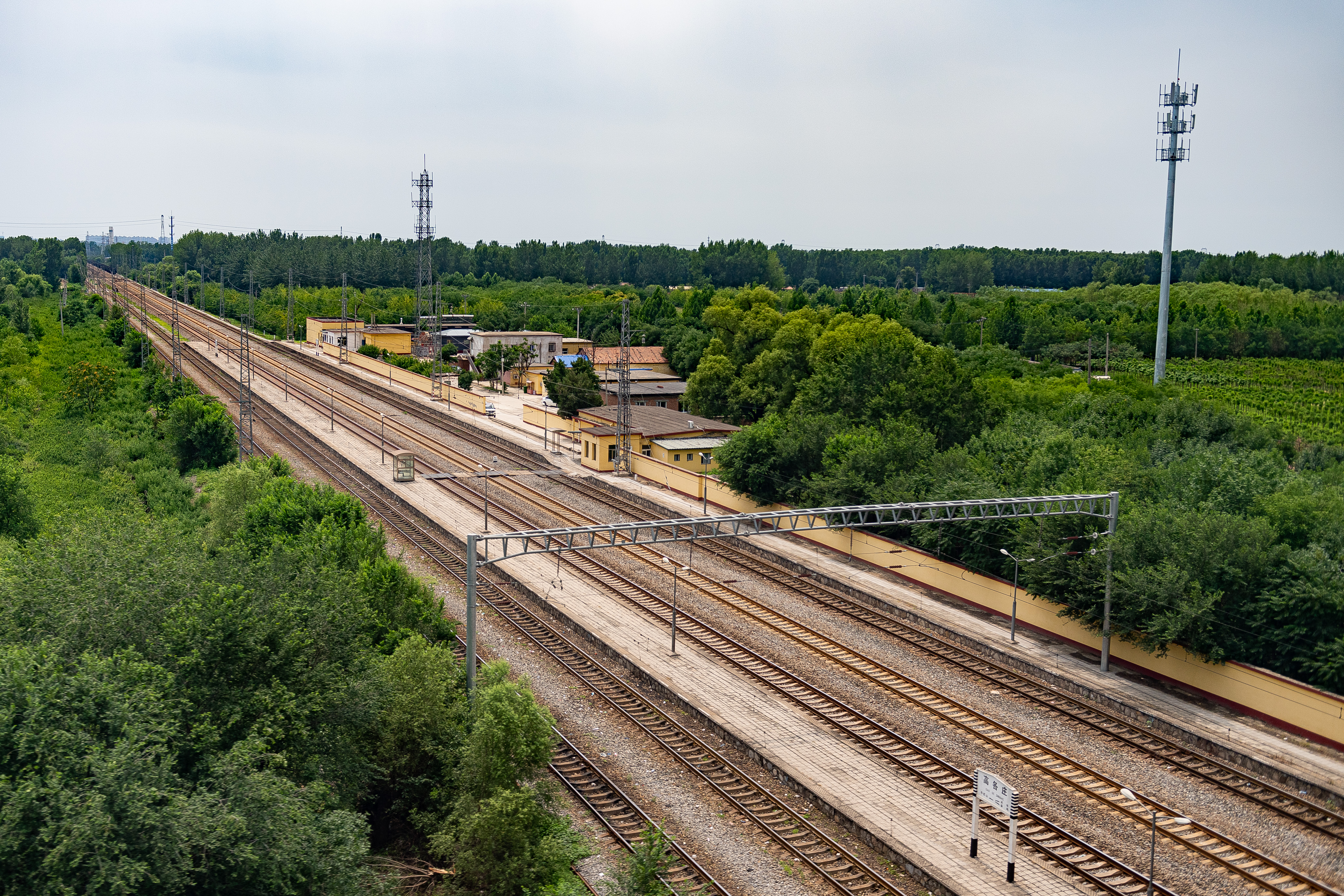
- Aerial view of Gaogezhuang Railway Station, 2021

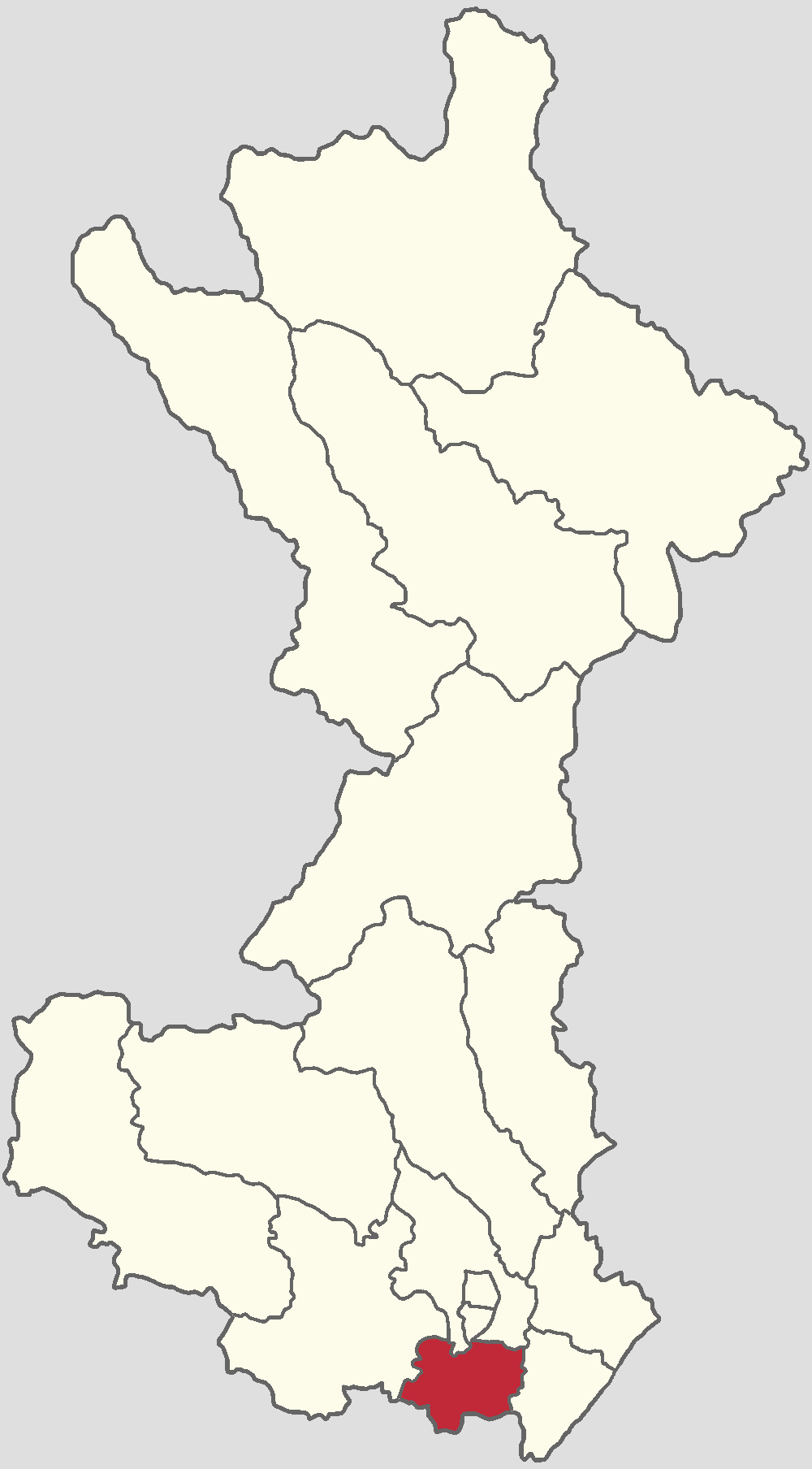
- Location in Huairou District

- Location within Beijing Location within China
- Coordinates: 40°17′30″N 116°37′22″E
- Country: China
- Municipality: Beijing
- District: Huairou
- Village-level Divisions: 2 communities 18 villages

Area
  - Total: 31.06 km^{2} (11.99 sq mi)
- Elevation: 44 m (144 ft)

Population (2020)
  - Total: 40,883
  - Density: 1,316/km^{2} (3,409/sq mi)
- Time zone: UTC+8 (China Standard)
- Postal code: 101401
- Area code: 010

Miaocheng Town (Chinese: 庙城镇; pinyin: Miàochéng Zhèn) is a town in southern Huairou District, Beijing, China. It shares border with Huairou Town and Longshan Subdistrict to its north, Yangsong Town to its east, Niulanshan and Zhaoquanying Towns to its south, Beishicao and Qiaozi Towns to its west. The 2020 census had determined the town's population to be 40,883.

In 1127, Xiao Dali, the second empress consort of Emperor Xingzong of Liao, constructed a temple and a fortification in the region. The settlement here later got the name Miaocheng (Chinese: 庙城; lit. 'Temple Fort').

== History ==
Timeline of Miaocheng Town
Time	Status	Within
Ming and Qing dynasty	Caijiali	Huairou County, Shuntian Prefecture
1912 – 1948	1st District	Huairou County, Capital Area
1948 – 1949	7th District	Huairou County, Capital Area
1949 – 1950	7th District; 4th District; Chengguan District	Huairou County, Hebei
1950 – 1958	Huogezhuang Township; Zhengzhong Township	Huairou County, Hebei
1958 – 1959	Bayi People's Commune; Dongfeng People's Commune	Huairou County, Beijing
1959 – 1961	Chengguan People's Commune; Qiaozi People's Commune	Huairou County, Beijing
1961 – 1983	Miaocheng People's Commune	Huairou County, Beijing
1983 – 1990	Miaocheng Township	Huairou County, Beijing
1990 – 2001	Miaocheng Town	Huairou County, Beijing
2001 – 2002	Miaocheng Town	Huairou District, Beijing
2002–present	Miaocheng Area (Maiocheng Town)	Huairou District, Beijing

== Administrative divisions ==
As of the year 2021, Miaocheng Town had 20 subdivisions, including 2 communities and 18 villages:

Subdivision names	Name transliterations	Type
庙城	Miaocheng	Community
金山	Jinshan	Community
高两河	Gaolianghe	Village
李两河	Lilianghe	Village
小杜两河	Xiao Dulianghe	Village
刘两河	Liulianghe	Village
大杜两河	Da Dulianghe	Village
肖两河	Xiaolianghe	Village
赵各庄	Zhaogezhuang	Village
霍各庄	Huogezhuang	Village
焦村	Jiaocun	Village
彩各庄	Caigezhuang	Village
庙城	Miaocheng	Village
桃山	Taoshan	Village
王史山	Wangshishan	Village
孙史山	Sunshishan	Village
高各庄	Gaogezhuang	Village
郑重庄	Zhengzhongzhuang	Village
西台上	Xitai Shang	Village
西台下	Xitai Xia	Village

== See also ==
- List of township-level divisions of Beijing
