= Beixiaoying =

Beixiaoying Town 北小营镇
- Town
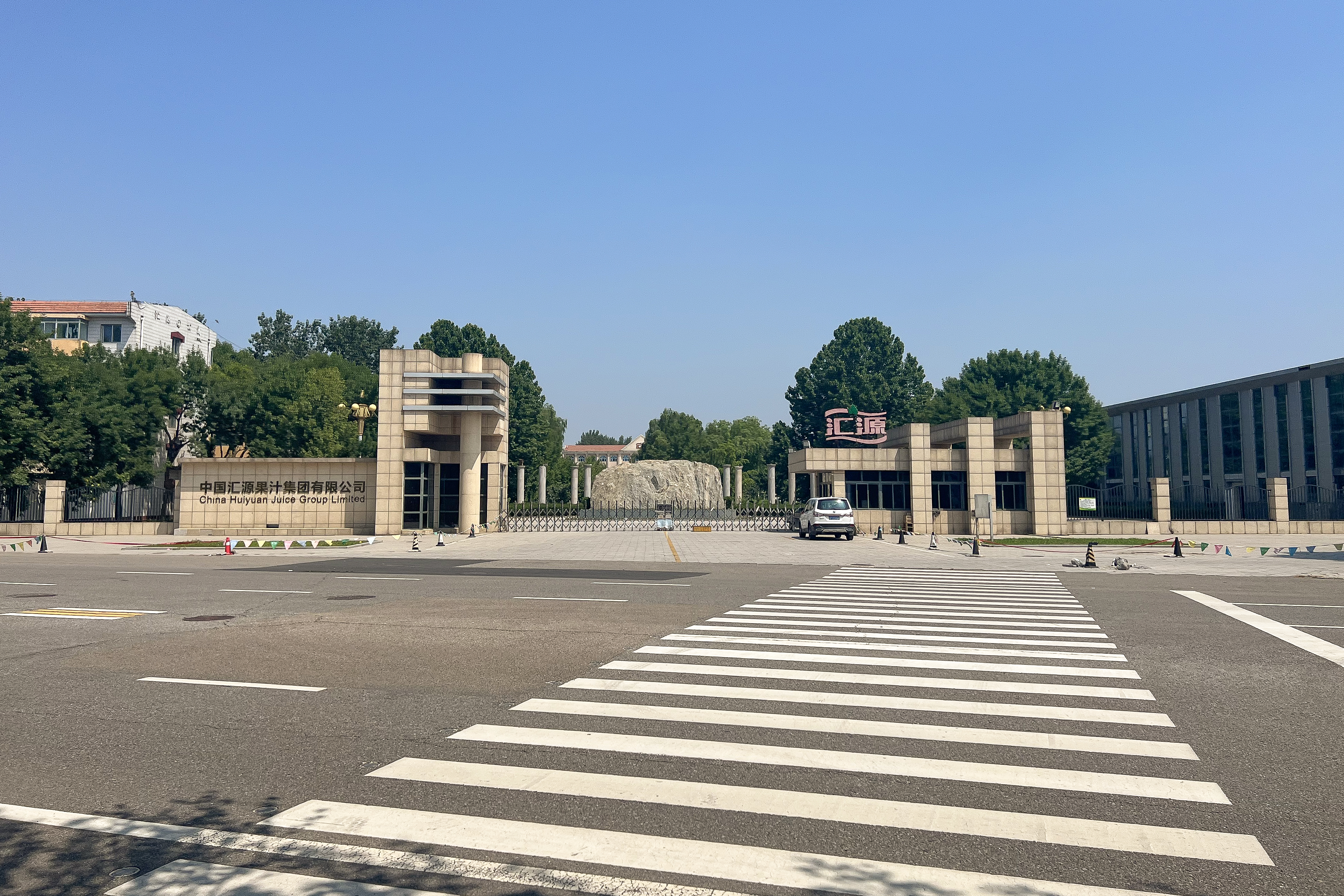
- Headquarters of Huiyuan Juice near the town hall

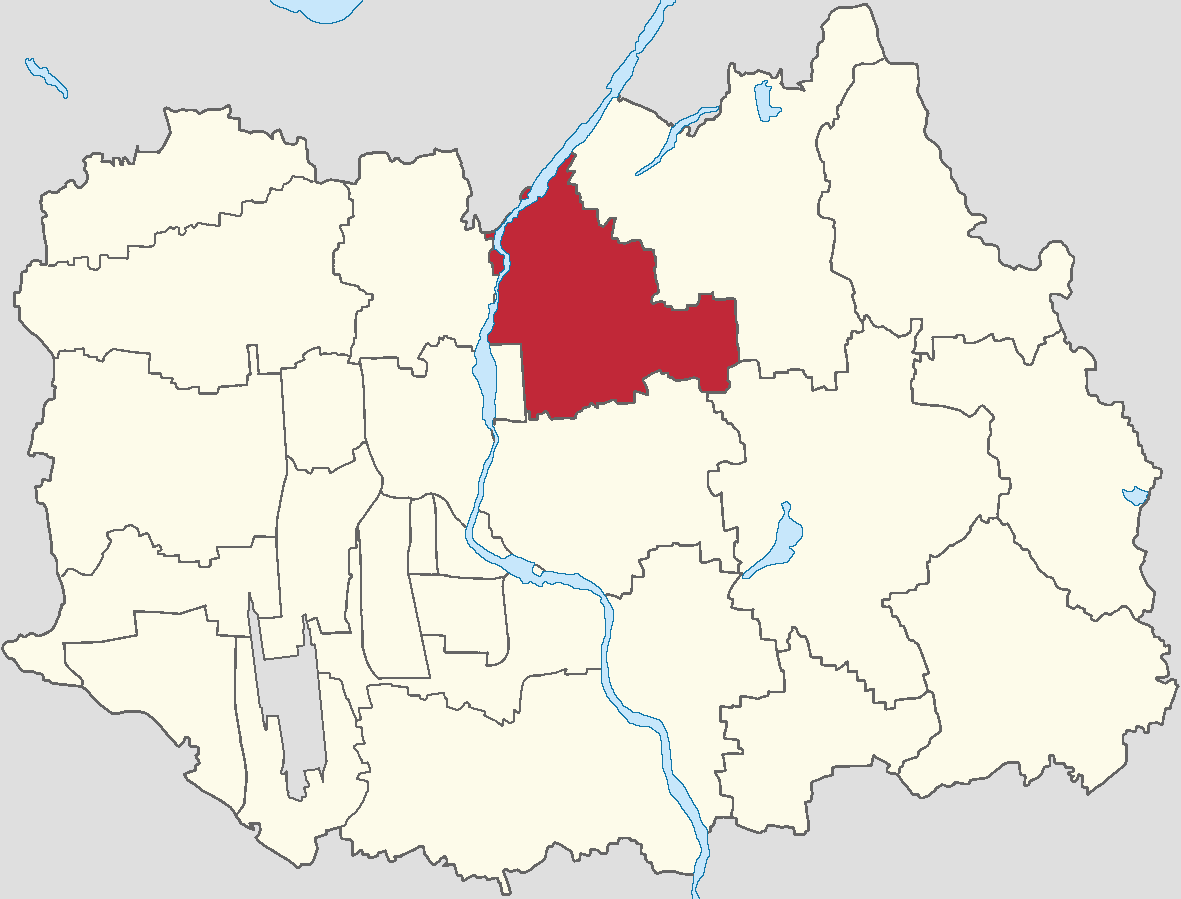
- Location of Beixiaoying Town within Shunyi District

- Location within Beijing Location within China
- Coordinates: 40°12′10″N 116°43′23″E
- Country: China
- Municipality: Beijing
- District: Shunyi
- Village-level Divisions: 2 communities 17 villages

Area
  - Total: 52.51 km^{2} (20.27 sq mi)
- Elevation: 35 m (115 ft)

Population (2020)
  - Total: 42,805
  - Density: 815.2/km^{2} (2,111/sq mi)
- Time zone: UTC+8 (China Standard)
- Postal code: 101305
- Area code: 010

Beixiaoying Town (simplified Chinese: 北小营镇; traditional Chinese: 北小營鎮; pinyin: Běixiǎoyíng Zhèn) is one of the 19 towns of Shunyi District, Beijing. It shares border with Yangsong Town to the north, Mulin Town to the east, Yang and Nancai Towns to the south, Shuangfeng Subdistrict and Niulanshan Town to the west. As of 2020, it had a total population of 42,805.

The name Beixiaoying (Chinese: 北小营; lit. 'North Small Camp') originated from the Han dynasty, when the then Yuyang Commander Zhang Kan (张堪) established two military station in the region, and Beixiaoying is evolved from the northern settlement.

== History ==
Timeline of Beixiaoying Town
Time	Status	Within
1912–1949	8th District	Shunyi County
1949–1956	3rd District	Shunyi County
1956–1958	Beixiaoying Township	Shunyi County
1958–1961	Part of Mulin People's Commune	Shunyi County
1961–1983	Beixiaoying People's Commune (Integrated southwestern part of Mafang People's Commune in 1978)	Shunyi County
1983–1989	Beixiaoying Township	Shunyi County
1989–1998	Beixiaoying Town	Shunyi County
1998–present	Beixiaoying Town	Shunyi District

== Administrative divisions ==
In 2021, Beixiaoying Town was composed of 19 subdivisions, more specifically 2 communities and 17 villages:

Administrative division code	Subdivision names	Name transliteration	Type
110113113001	永利	Yongli	Community
110113113002	水色时光花园	Shuise Shiguang Huayuan	Community
110113113201	北小营	Beixiaoying	Village
110113113202	上辇	Shangnian	Village
110113113203	北府	Beifu	Village
110113113204	东乌鸡	Dong Wuya	Village
110113113205	西乌鸡	Xi Wuya	Village
110113113206	榆林	Yulin	Village
110113113207	后礼务	Hou Liwu	Village
110113113208	前礼务	Qian Liwu	Village
110113113209	马辛庄	Maxinzhuang	Village
110113113210	前鲁各庄	Qian Lugezhuang	Village
110113113211	后鲁各庄	Hou Lugezhuang	Village
110113113212	仇家店	Qiujiadian	Village
110113113213	西府	Xifu	Village
110113113214	东府	Dongfu	Village
110113113215	小胡营	Xiao Huying	Village
110113113216	大胡营	Da Huying	Village
110113113217	牛富屯	Niufutun	Village

== Landmark ==
- Shunyi Olympic Rowing-Canoeing Park

== Gallery ==
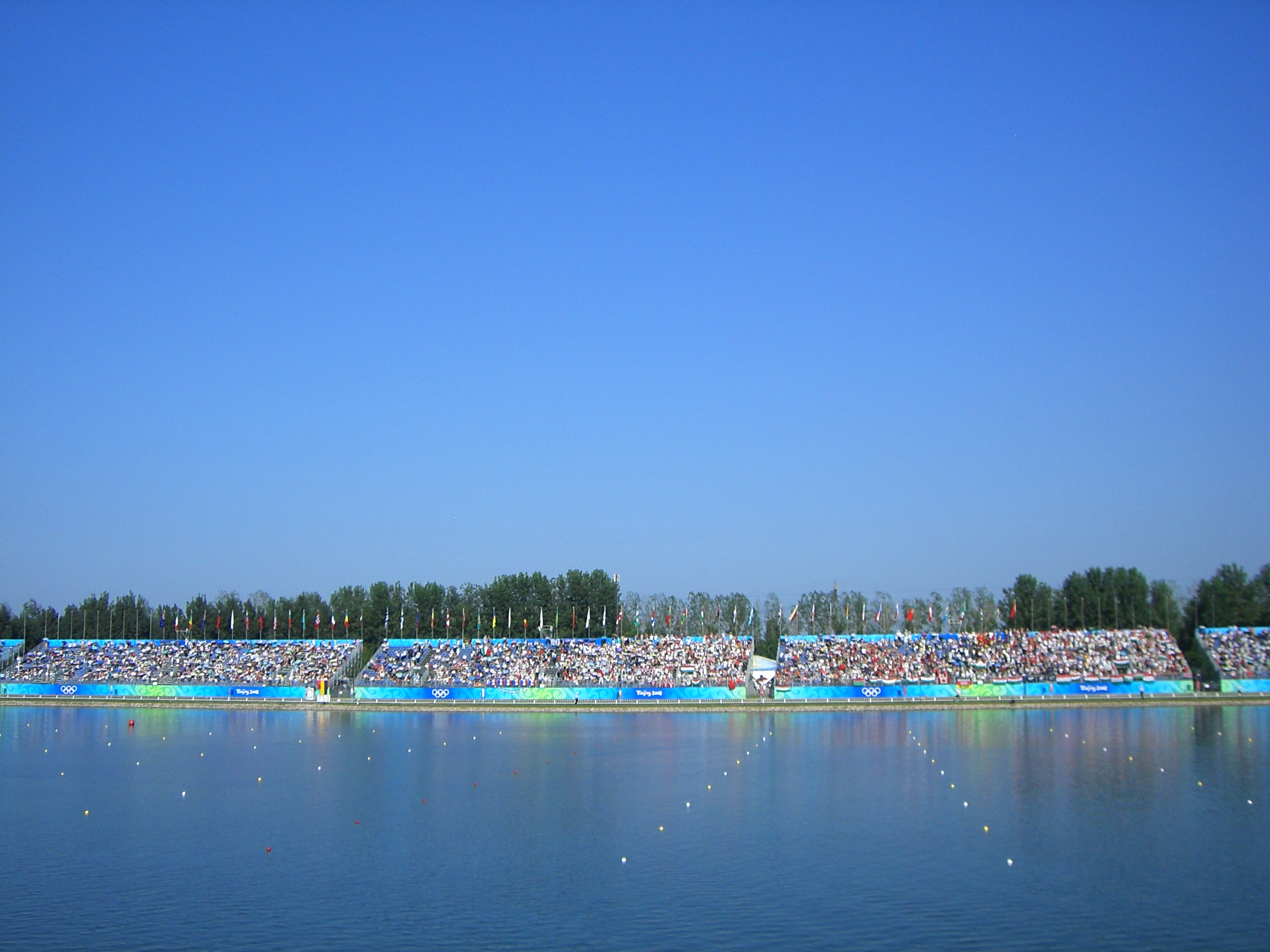
Water park during Olympics, 2008

== See also ==
- List of township-level divisions of Beijing
