= Qingcheng =

Qingcheng may refer to the following in China:

- Mount Qingcheng (青城山), near Dujiangyan, Sichuan, one of the most important centres of Taoism in China
- Qingcheng County (庆城县), of Qingyang, Gansu
- Qingcheng District (清城区), Qingyuan, Guangdong
- Qingcheng Park (青城公园), in Hohhot, Inner Mongolia

Towns

- Qingcheng, Qingcheng County (庆城镇), seat of Qingcheng County, Gansu

Written as "青城镇":

- Qingcheng, Yuzhong County, in Yuzhong County, Gansu
- Qingcheng, Gaoqing County, in Gaoqing County, Shandong
- Qingcheng, Heshun County, in Heshun County, Shanxi

== See also ==
- Qincheng (disambiguation)
