= Xingshou =

Town located in Beijing, China

Xingshou Town 兴寿镇
- Town
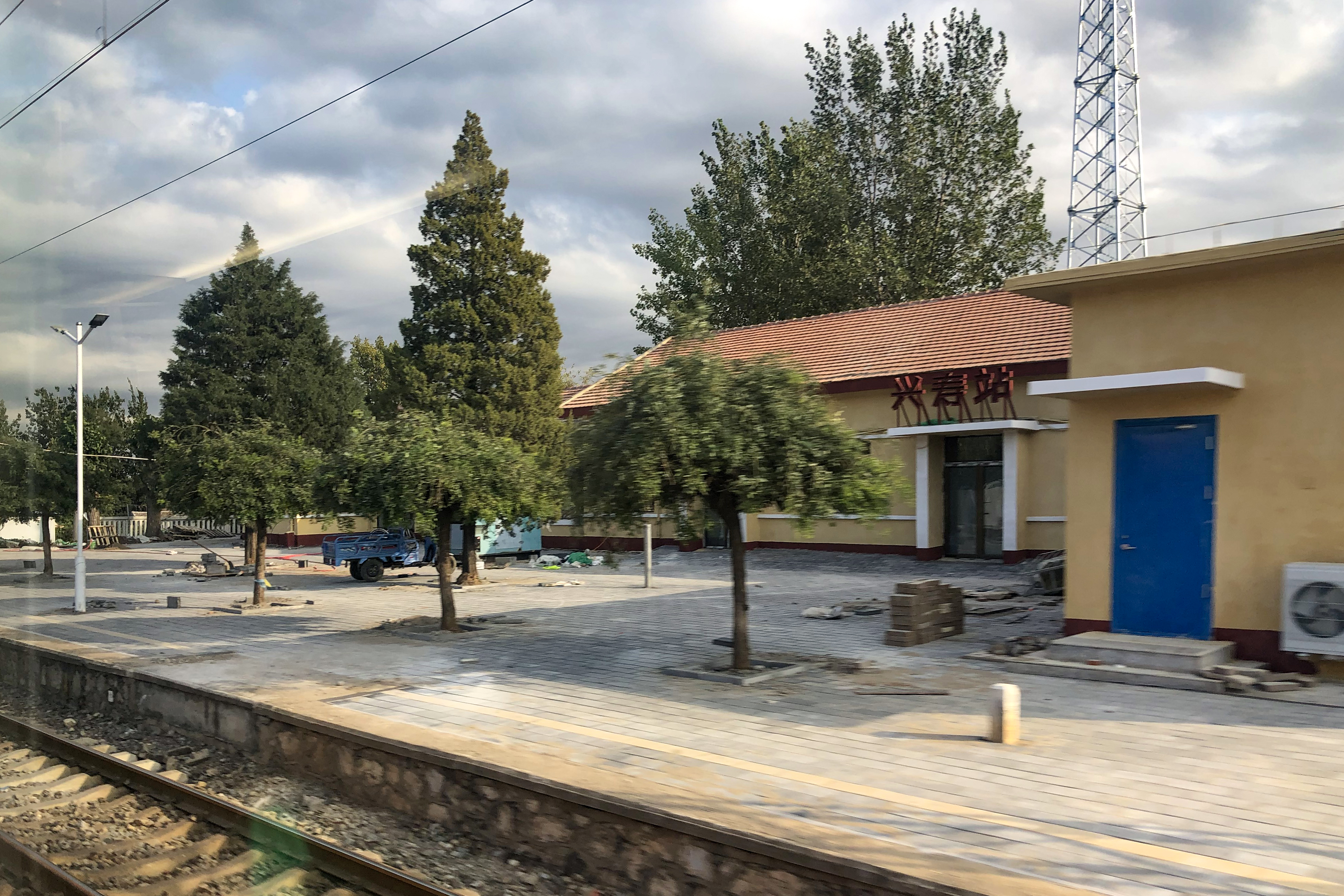
- Xingshou Railway Station

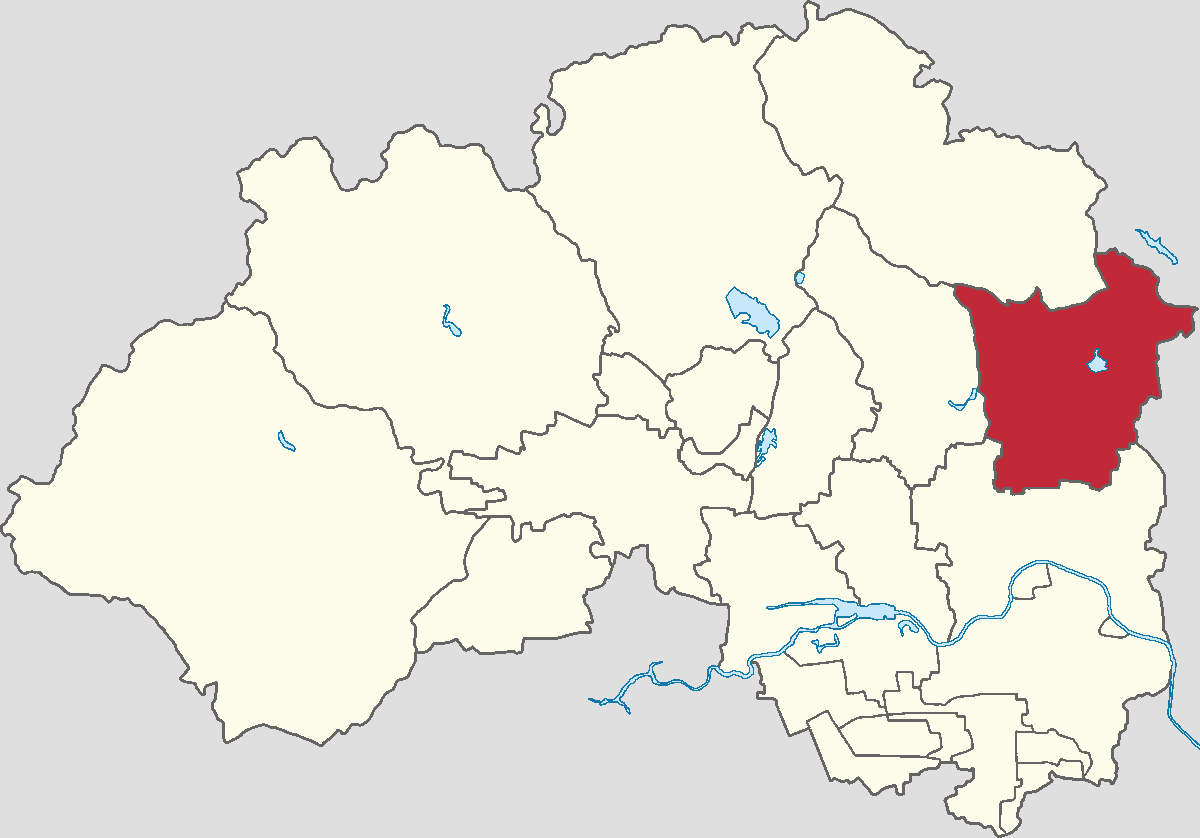
- Location within Changping District

- Location within Beijing Location within China
- Coordinates: 40°12′47″N 116°24′11″E
- Country: China
- Municipality: Beijing
- District: Changping
- Village-level Divisions: 21 villages

Area
  - Total: 74.88 km^{2} (28.91 sq mi)
- Elevation: 48 m (157 ft)

Population (2020)
  - Total: 34,139
  - Density: 455.9/km^{2} (1,181/sq mi)
- Time zone: UTC+8 (China Standard)
- Postal code: 102211
- Area code: 010

Xingshou Town (simplified Chinese: 兴寿镇; traditional Chinese: 興壽鎮; pinyin: Xìngshòu Zhèn) is a town located in the east end of Changping District, Beijing, China. Bounded by Taihang Mountain Range to its immediate north, Xingshou shares border with Qiaozi and Yanshou Towns in the north, Beishicao and Zhaoquanying Towns in the east, Xiaotangshan Town in the south, and Cuicun Town in the west. It had a total population of 34,139 as of 2020.

Xingshou (Chinese: 兴寿; lit. 'Rise Lifespan'), The name of the town, came from Chongshou Buddhist Temple (崇寿禅寺), also named "Xingshouli" (兴寿里), that was built in the region during the Liao dynasty.

== History ==
History of Xingshou Town
Year	Status	Under
1948 - 1949	4th District	Changshun County
1949 - 1953	4th District	Changping County
1953 - 1956	Xingshou Township Taolin Township Xiangtun Township	Changping County
1956 - 1958	Xingshou Township	Changping County
1958 - 1961	Part of Xiaotangshan People's Commune	Changping County
1961 - 1982	Xingshou People's Commune	Changping County
1982 - 1997	Xingshou Township	Changping County
1997 - 1999	Xingshou Town (Incorporated Shangyuan and Xiazhuang Townships in 1997. 9 villages transferred to Yanshou Town in 2011)	Changping County
1999–present	Xingshou Town (Incorporated Shangyuan and Xiazhuang Townships in 1997. 9 villages transferred to Yanshou Town in 2011)	Changping District

== Administrative divisions ==
As of 2021, Xingshou Town was subdivided 21 villages:

Administrative division code	Subdivision names	Name transliteration
110114116201	兴寿村	Xingshoucun
110114116202	肖村	Xiaocun
110114116203	香屯村	Xiangtuncun
110114116204	沙坨村	Shatuocun
110114116205	东庄村	Dongzhuangcun
110114116206	辛庄村	Xinzhuangcun
110114116207	桃林村	Taolincun
110114116208	秦城村	Qinchengcun
110114116209	象房村	Xiangfangcun
110114116210	东新城村	Dongxinchengcun
110114116211	东营村	Dongyingcun
110114116212	西营村	Xiyingcun
110114116213	麦庄村	Maizhuangcun
110114116214	西新城村	Xixinchengcun
110114116215	下苑村	Xiayuancun
110114116216	秦家屯村	Qinjiatuncun
110114116217	上苑村	Shangyuancun
110114116218	桃峪口村	Taoyukoucun
110114116219	暴峪泉村	Baoyuquancun
110114116220	半壁店村	Banbidiancun
110114116221	上西市村	Shangxishicun

== Gallery ==
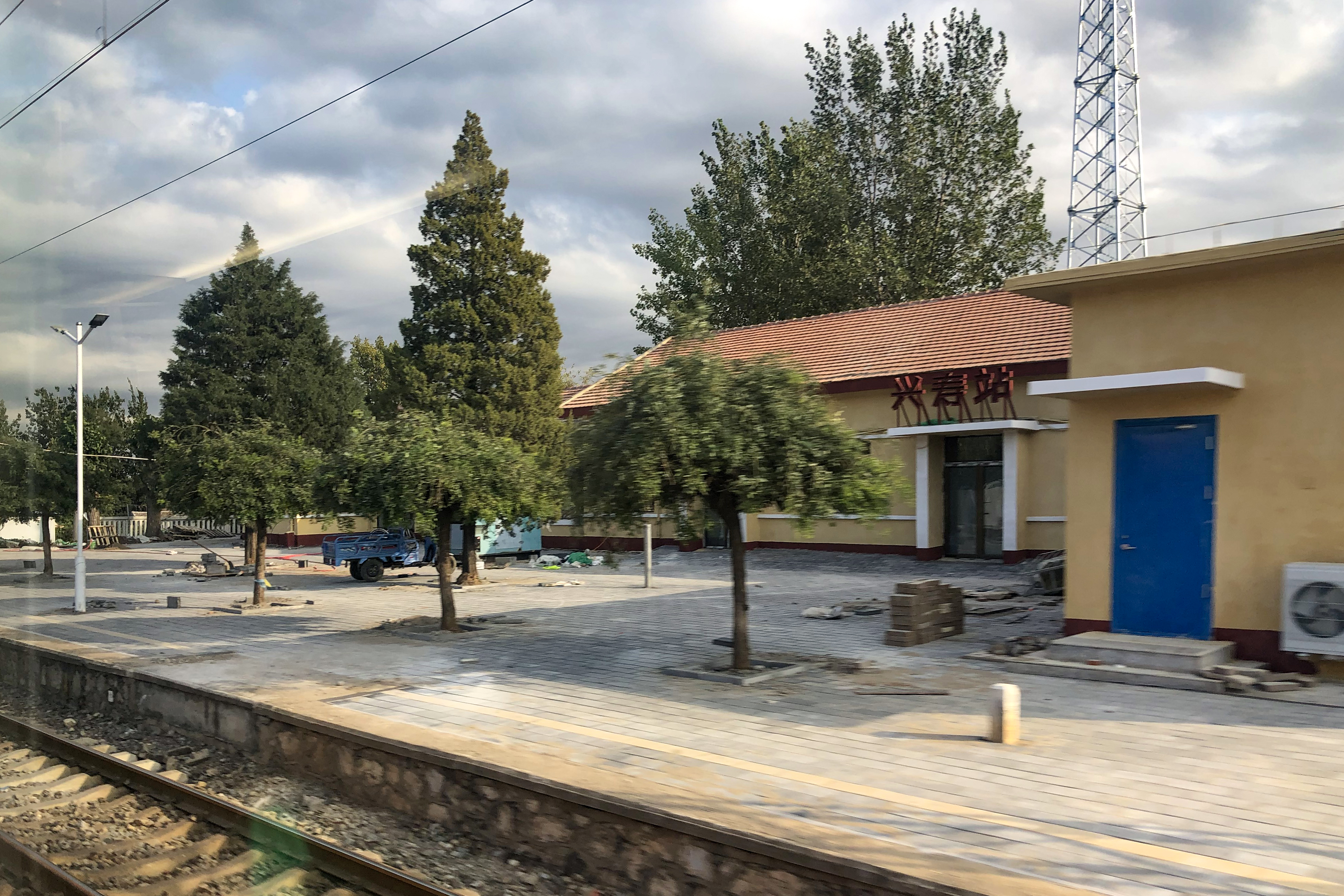
Xingshou Railway Station, 2020

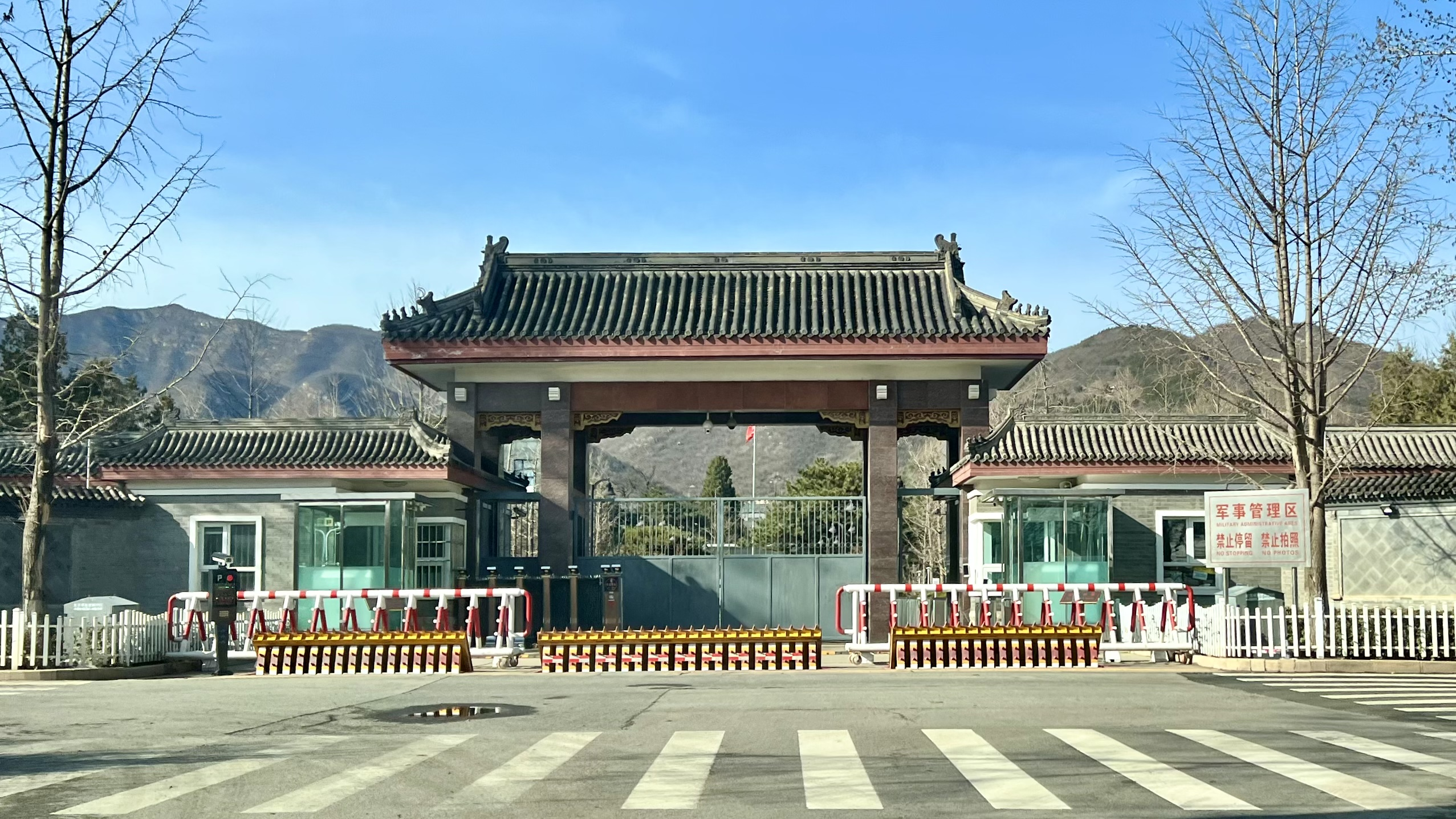
South Entrance of Qincheng Prison, 2022

== See also ==
- List of township-level divisions of Beijing
