= Beishicao =

Town located in Beijing, China

Beishicao Town 北石槽镇
- Town
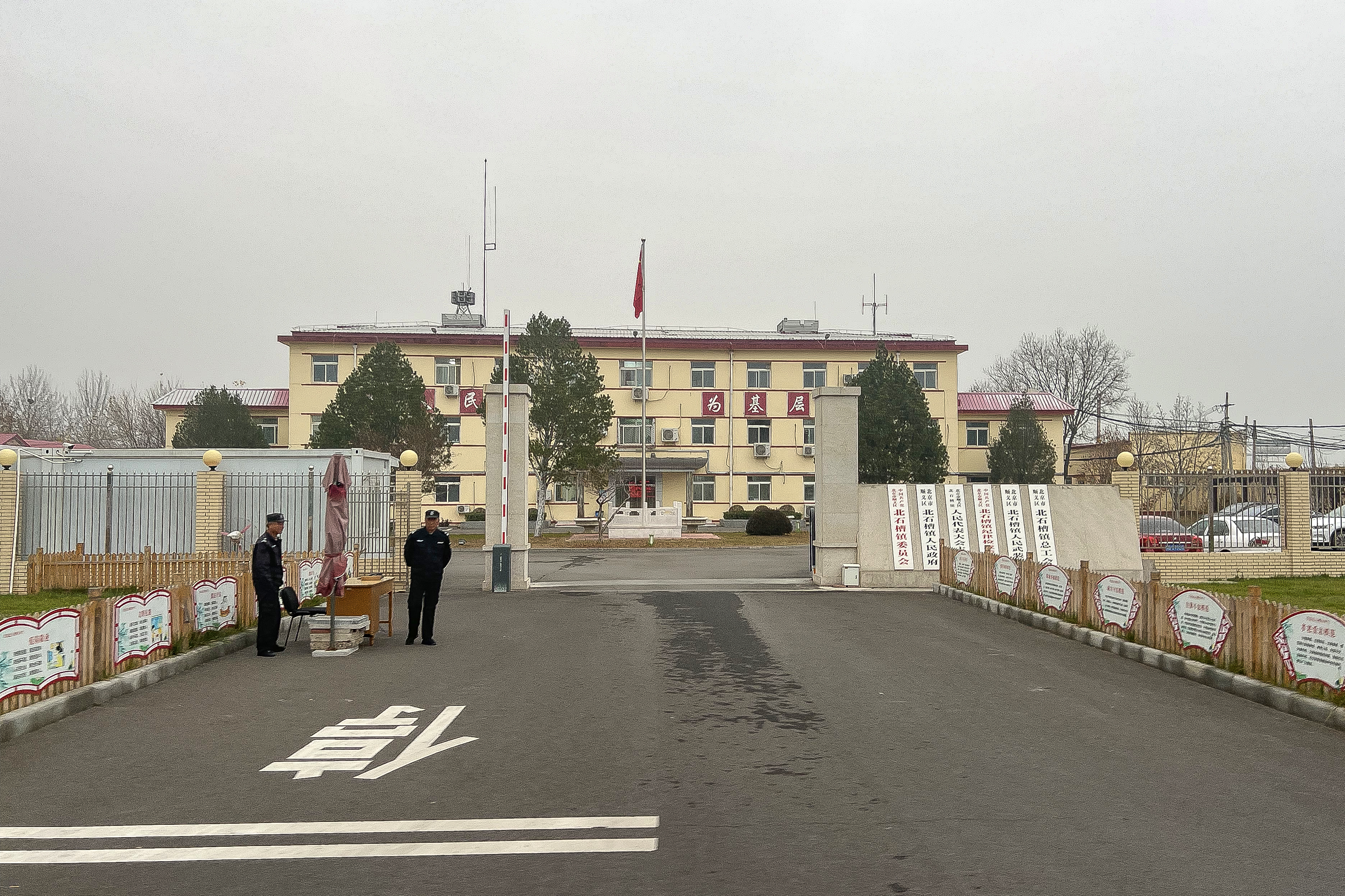

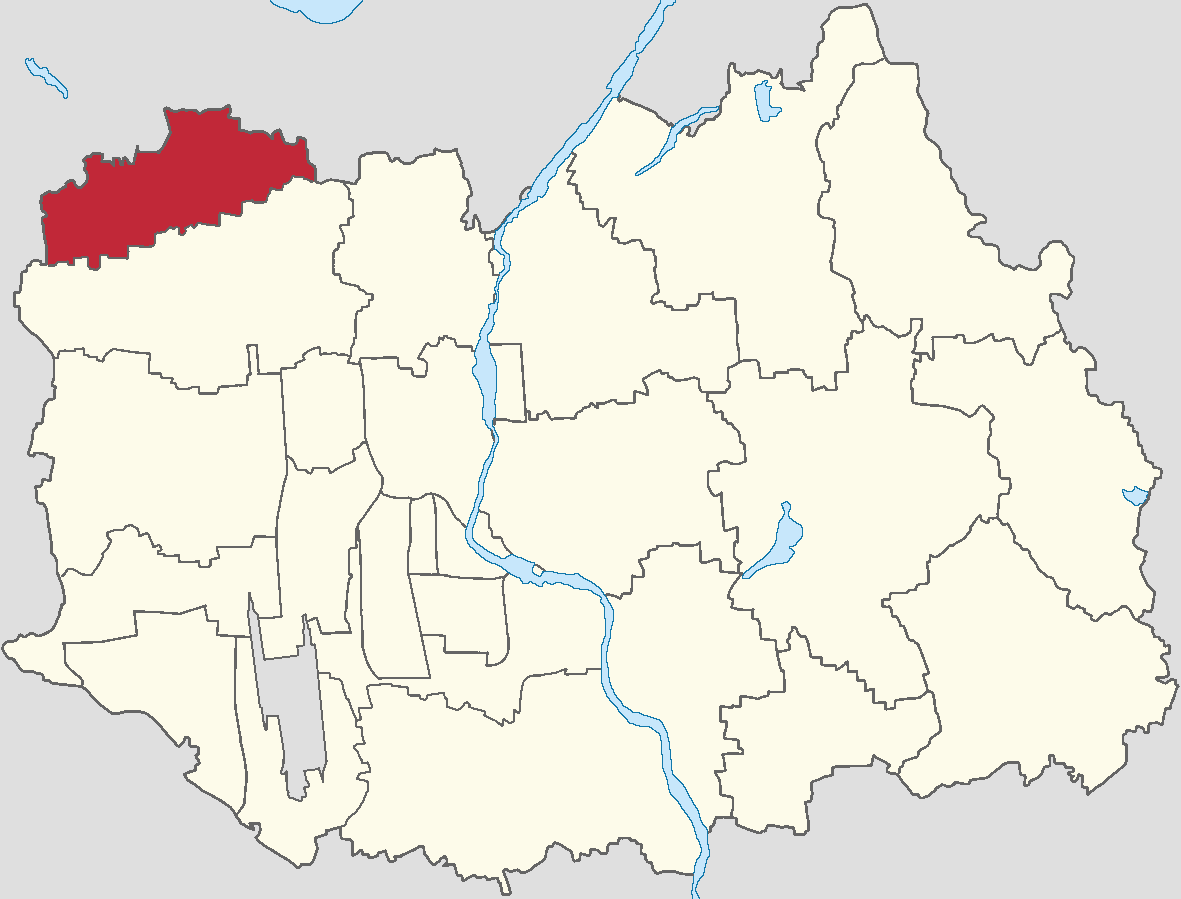
- Location of Beishicao Town within Shunyi District

- Location within Beijing Location within China
- Coordinates: 40°14′53″N 116°31′21″E
- Country: China
- Municipality: Beijing
- District: Shunyi
- Village-level Divisions: 16 villages

Area
  - Total: 32.48 km^{2} (12.54 sq mi)
- Elevation: 58 m (190 ft)

Population (2020)
  - Total: 15,109
  - Density: 465.2/km^{2} (1,205/sq mi)
- Time zone: UTC+8 (China Standard)
- Postal code: 101315
- Area code: 010

Beishicao Town (simplified Chinese: 北石槽镇; traditional Chinese: 北石槽鎮; pinyin: Běishícáo Zhèn) is a town located within Shunyi District, Beijing. It borders Qiaozi Town in its north, Miaocheng Town in its east, Zhaoquanying Town in its south, and Xingshou Town in its west. In 2020, the census counted 15,109 residents for this town.

The name Beishicao (Chinese: 北石槽; lit. 'North Rock Trench') was taken from its location north of a stone ditch during the Yuan dynasty.

== History ==
Timetable of Beishicao Town
Time	Status	Belonged to
Qing dynasty	Zhengxi Circuit Xibei Circuit	Shunyi County
1912–1949	6th District	Shunyi County
1949–1950	11th District	Shunyi County
1950–1956	2nd District	Shunyi County
1956–1958	Dongshicao Township	Shunyi County
1958–1961	Banqiao Management District, part of Niulanshan People's Commune	Shunyi County
1961–1975	Banqiao People's Commune	Shunyi County
1975–1983	Beishicao People's Commune	Shunyi County
1983–1994	Beishicao Township	Shunyi County
1994–1998	Beishicao Town	Shunyi County
1998–present	Beishicao Town	Shunyi District

== Administrative divisions ==
As of 2021, the following 16 villages constituted Beishicao Town:

Administrative division code	Subdivision names	Name transliteration
110113115201	西赵各庄	Xi Zhaogezhuang
110113115202	下西市	Xiaxishi
110113115203	良善庄	Liangshanzhuang
110113115204	西范各庄	Xi Fangezhuang
110113115205	南石槽	Nan Shicao
110113115206	北石槽	Bei Shicao
110113115207	东石槽	Dong Shicao
110113115208	东辛庄	Dongxinzhuang
110113115209	寺上	Sishang
110113115210	营尔	Ying'er
110113115211	武各庄	Wugezhuang
110113115212	刘各庄	Liugezhuang
110113115213	中滩营	Zhongtanying
110113115214	二张营	Erzhangying
110113115215	大柳树营	Da Liushuying
110113115216	李家史山	Lijiashishan

== See also ==
- List of township-level divisions of Beijing
