= Mulin =

Mulin Town 木林镇
- Town
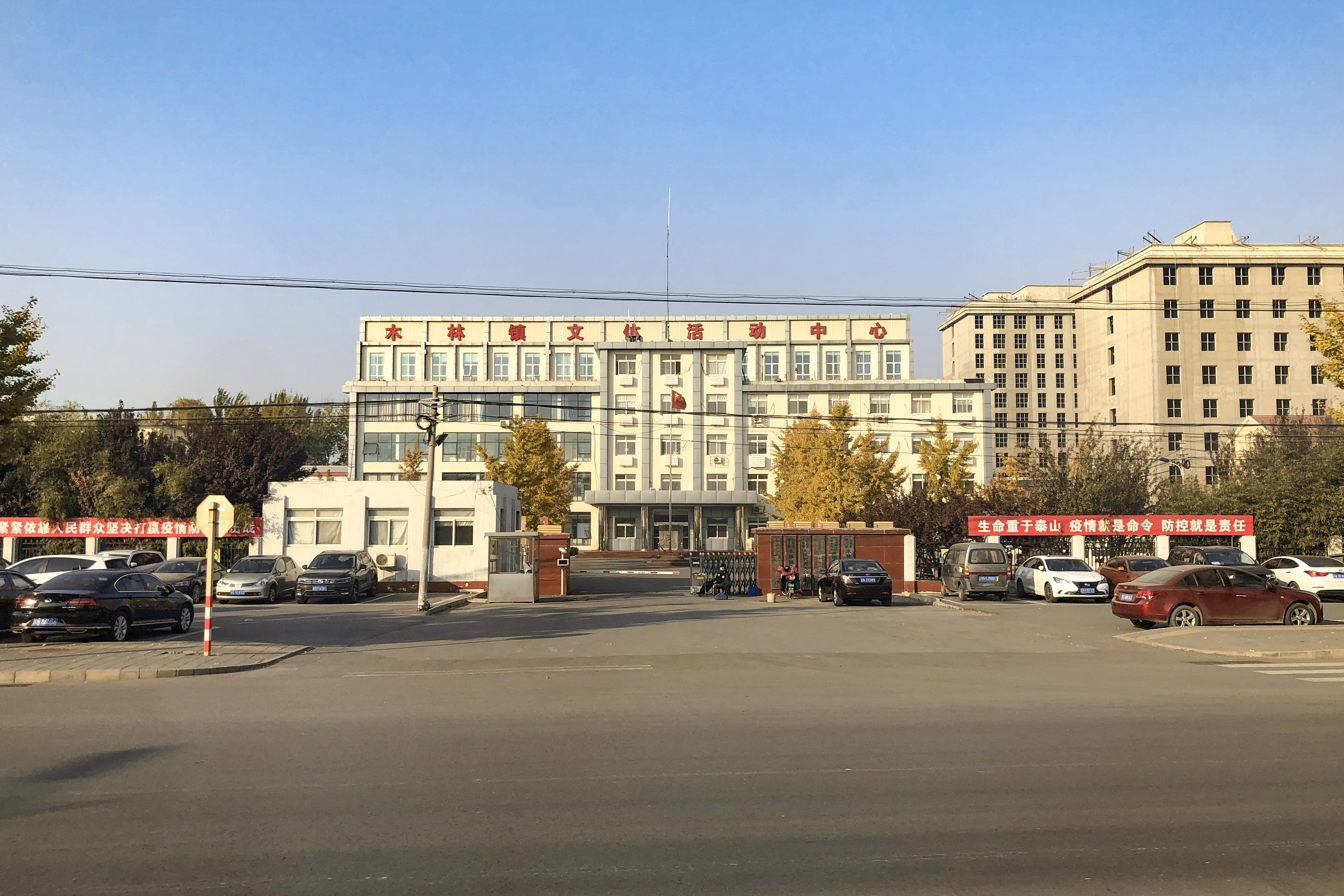
- Government of Mulin Town, 2020

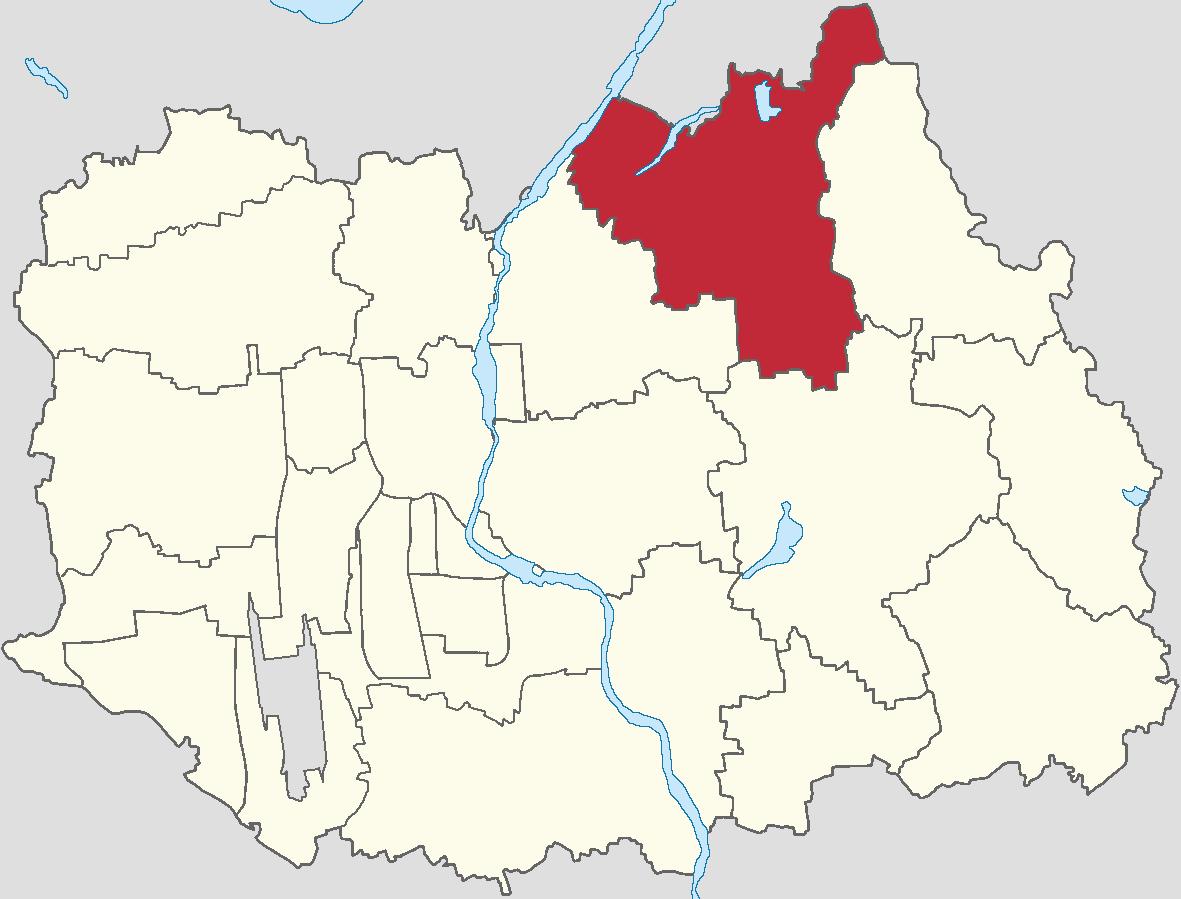
- Location of Mulin Town within Shunyi District

- Location within Beijing Location within China
- Coordinates: 40°14′41″N 116°46′30″E
- Country: China
- Municipality: Beijing
- District: Shunyi
- Village-level Divisions: 26 villages

Area
  - Total: 83.27 km^{2} (32.15 sq mi)
- Elevation: 45 m (148 ft)

Population (2020)
  - Total: 34,114
  - Density: 409.7/km^{2} (1,061/sq mi)
- Time zone: UTC+8 (China Standard)
- Postal code: 101314
- Area code: 010

Mulin Town (simplified Chinese: 木林镇; traditional Chinese: 木林鎮; pinyin: Mùlín Zhèn) is one of the 19 towns of Shunyi District, Beijing. It borders Henanzhai Town to its north, Dongshaoqu and Longwantun Towns to its east, Yang and Beixiaoying Towns to its south, and Yangsong Town in its west. It had 34,114 inhabitants under its administration as of 2020.

The town took its name Mulin (Chinese: 木林; lit. 'Wood Forest') from the forest on the west of the settlement during the reign of Wanli Emperor of Ming dynasty.

== History ==
Timeline of Mulin Town
Time	Status	Part of
1912–1949	3rd District	Huairou County
1949–1956	3rd District	Shunyi County
1956–1958	Mulin Township	Shunyi County
1958–1983	Mulin People's Commune	Shunyi County
1983–1989	Mulin Township	Shunyi County
1989–1998	Mulin Town (Incorporated Ligezhuang Township in 1997))	Shunyi County
1998–present	Mulin Town (Incorporated Ligezhuang Township in 1997))	Shunyi District

== Administrative divisions ==
As of 2021, Mulin Town oversaw 26 villages:

Administrative division code	Subdivision names	Name transliteration
110113112201	木林	Mulin
110113112202	陈各庄	Chengezhuang
110113112203	蒋各庄	Jianggezhuang
110113112204	魏家店	Weijiadian
110113112205	东沿头	Dong Yantou
110113112206	西沿头	Xi Yantou
110113112207	长林庄	Changlinzhuang
110113112208	孝德	Xiaode
110113112209	唐指山	Tangzhishan
110113112210	贾山	Jiashan
110113112211	茶棚	Chapeng
110113112212	安辛庄	Anxinzhuang
110113112213	王泮庄	Wangpanzhuang
110113112214	大韩庄	Da Hanzhuang
110113112215	小韩庄	Xiao Hanzhuang
110113112216	马坊	Mafang
110113112217	上园子	Shangyuanzi
110113112218	大林	Dalin
110113112219	陈家坨	Chenjiatuo
110113112220	李各庄	Ligezhuang
110113112221	业兴庄	Yexingzhuang
110113112222	陀头庙	Tuotoumiao
110113112223	荣各庄	Ronggezhuang
110113112224	前王各庄	Qian Wanggezhuang
110113112225	后王各庄	Hou Wanggezhuang
110113112226	潘家坟	Panjiafen

== See also ==
- List of township-level divisions of Beijing
