= Huairou Town =

Huairou Town 怀柔镇
- Town
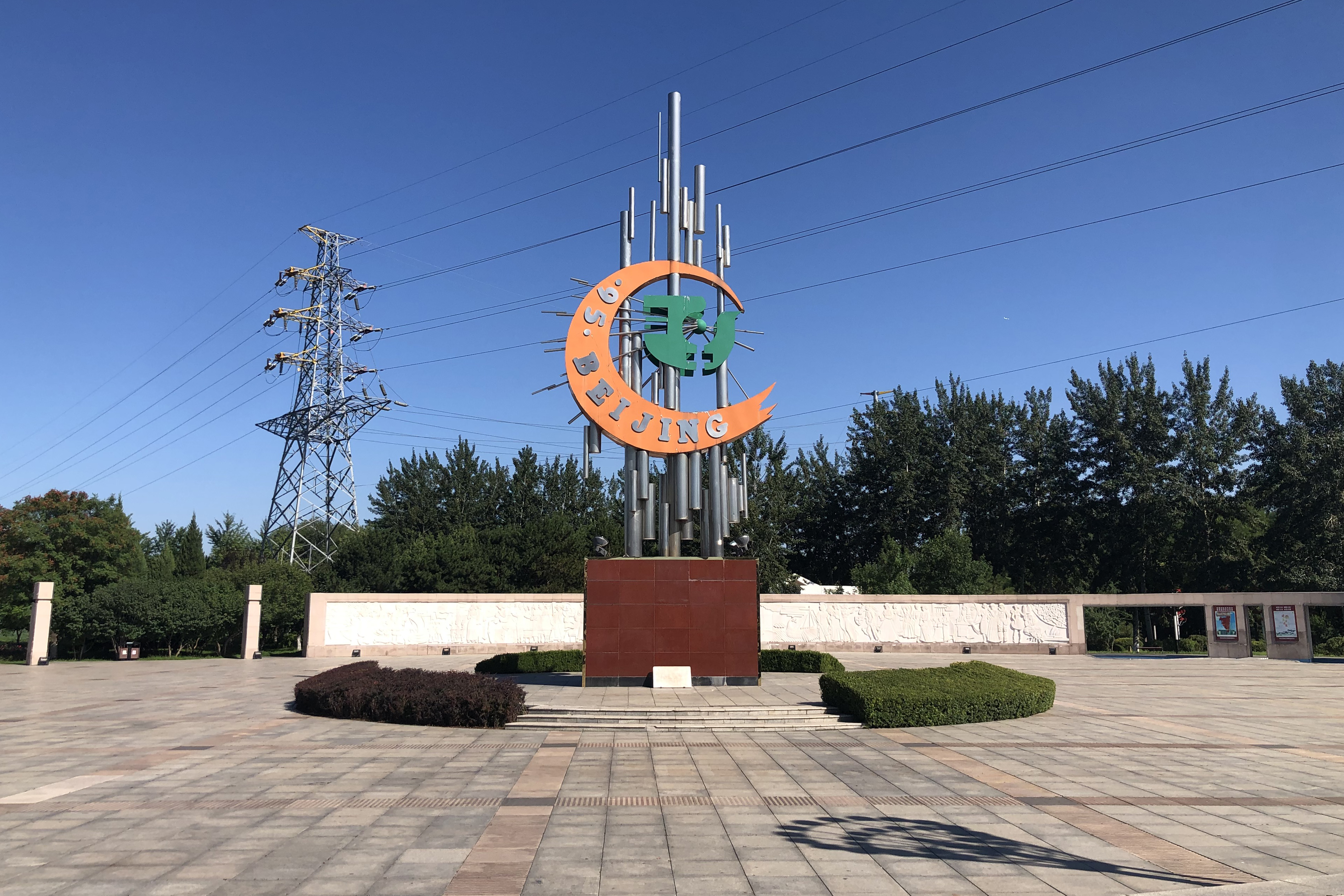
- Commemorative Park of the Fourth World Conference on Women, 2020

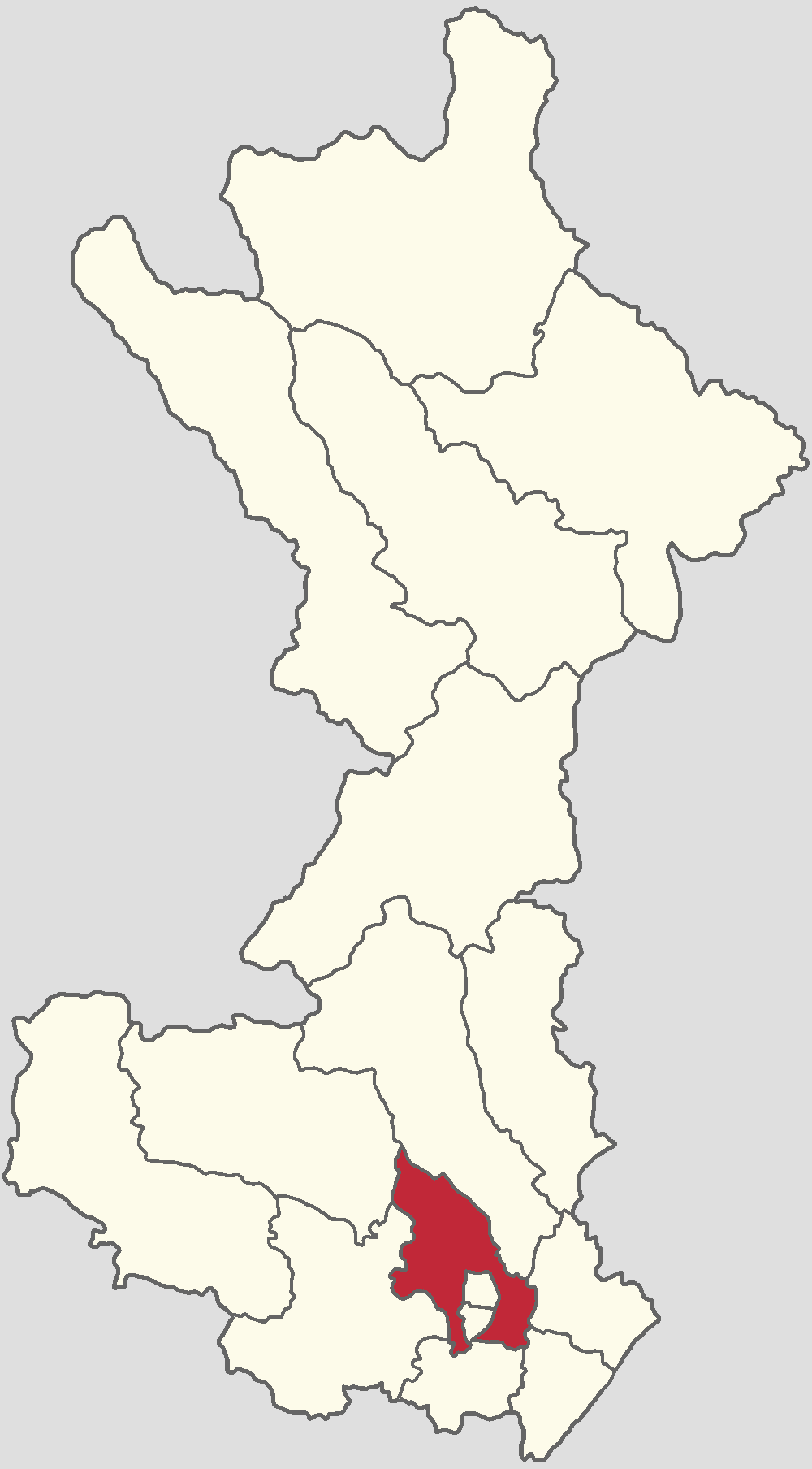
- Location of Huairou Town in Huairou District

- Location within Beijing Location within China
- Coordinates: 40°18′12″N 116°37′58″E
- Country: China
- Municipality: Beijing
- District: Huairou
- Village-level Divisions: 2 communities 18 villages

Area
  - Total: 59.73 km^{2} (23.06 sq mi)
- Elevation: 44 m (144 ft)

Population (2020)
  - Total: 41,990
  - Density: 703.0/km^{2} (1,821/sq mi)
- Time zone: UTC+8 (China Standard)
- Postal code: 101422
- Area code: 010

Huairou Town (Chinese: 怀柔镇; pinyin: Huáiróu Zhèn) is a town situated in the southern portion of Huairou District, Beijing, China. It borders Yanqi Town in the north, Beifang Town in the east, Yangsong and Miaocheng Towns in the south, Qiaozi and Bohai Towns in the west, and contains Quanhe and Longshan Subdistricts within. In 2020, its population was 41,990.

Its name Huairou came from Classic of Poetry, with the original meaning of "Solicit Comfort". It was first used as a name for this region during the Tang dynasty.

== History ==
Timeline of Huairou Town
Year	Status	Under
1950 – 1956	Chengguan Town	Huairou County, Hebei
1956 – 1957	Chengguan Town; Yanggechang Township; Liugechang Township	Huairou County, Hebei
1957 – 1958	Chengguan Town; Liugechang Township	Huairou County, Hebei
1958 – 1959	Bayi People's Commune	Huairou County, Beijing
1959 – 1960	Chengguan People's Commune	Huairou County, Beijing
1960 – 1961	Chengguan People's Commune; Wanghua People's Commune	Huairou County, Beijing
1961 – 1965	Chengguan People's Commune	Huairou County, Beijing
1965 – 1979	Chengguan People's Commune; Chengguan Town	Huairou County, Beijing
1979 – 1980	Zhongfule People's Commune; Chengguan Town	Huairou County, Beijing
1980 – 1983	Chengguan People's Commune; Chengguan Town	Huairou County, Beijing
1983 – 1990	Chengguan Township; Chengguan Town	Huairou County, Beijing
1990 – 2001	Huairou Town	Huairou County, Beijing
2001 – 2002	Huairou Town	Huairou District, Beijing
2002–present	Huairou Area (Huairou Town)	Huairou District, Beijing

== Administrative divisions ==
In 2021, Huairou Town had direct jurisdiction over of 20 subdivisions, in which 2 were communities and 18 were villages:

Subdivision names	Name transliterations	Type
红螺家园	Hongluo Jiayuan	Community
滨河馨居	Binhe Xinju	Community
石厂	Shichang	Village
葛各庄	Gegezhuang	Village
唐自口	Tangzikou	Village
张各长	Zhanggechang	Village
王化	Wanghua	Village
大屯	Datun	Village
大中富乐	Da Zhongfule	Village
刘各长	Liugechang	Village
东四村	Dongsicun	Village
芦庄	Luzhuang	Village
红螺镇	Hongluozhen	Village
西三村	Xisancun	Village
甘涧峪	Ganjianyu	Village
郭家坞	Guojiawu	Village
红军庄	Hongjunzhuang	Village
孟庄	Mengzhuang	Village
兴隆庄	Xinglongzhuang	Village
卧龙岗	Wolonggang	Village

== Landmark ==
- Hongluo Temple

== Gallery ==
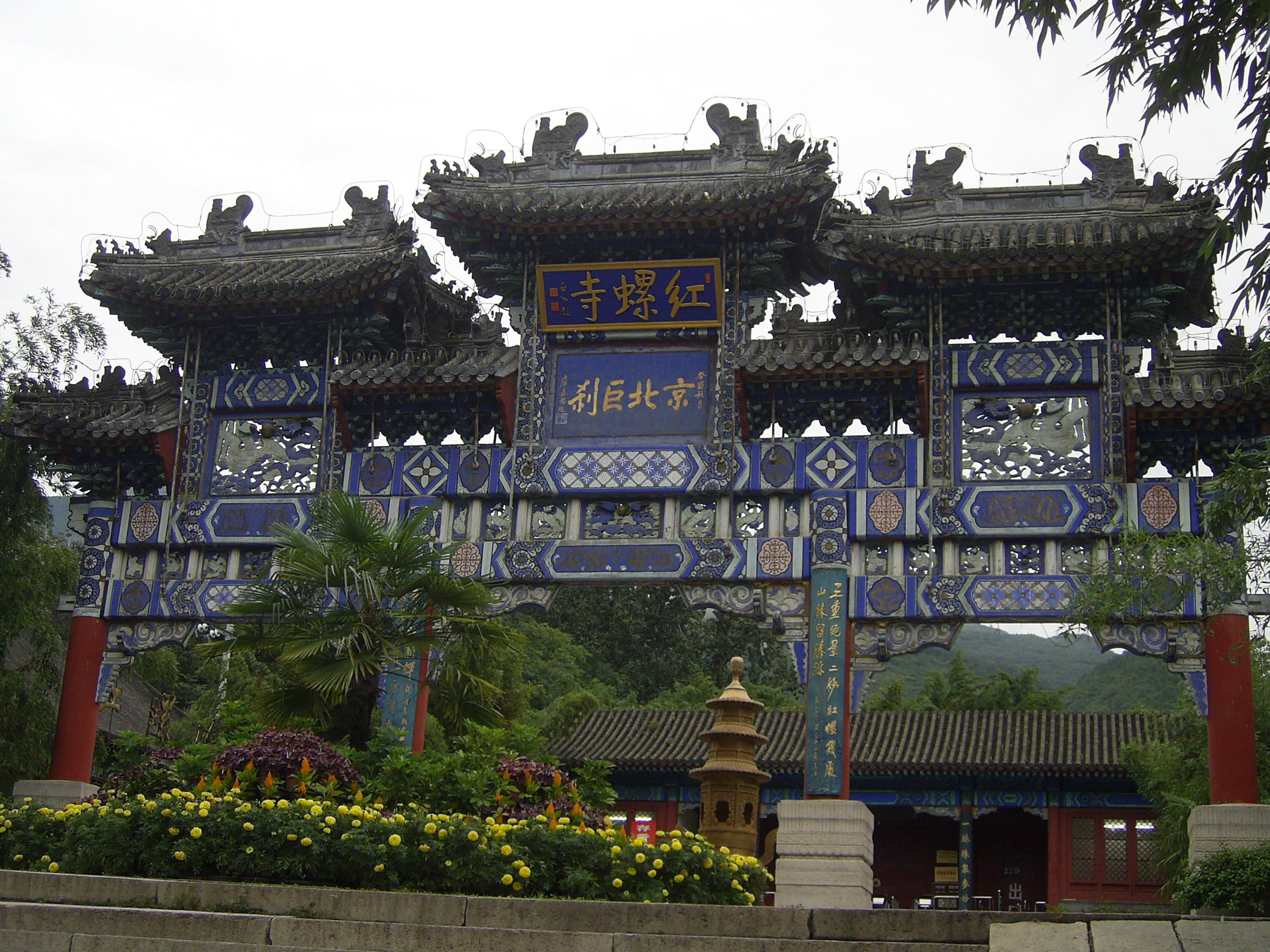
Hongluo Temple, 2009

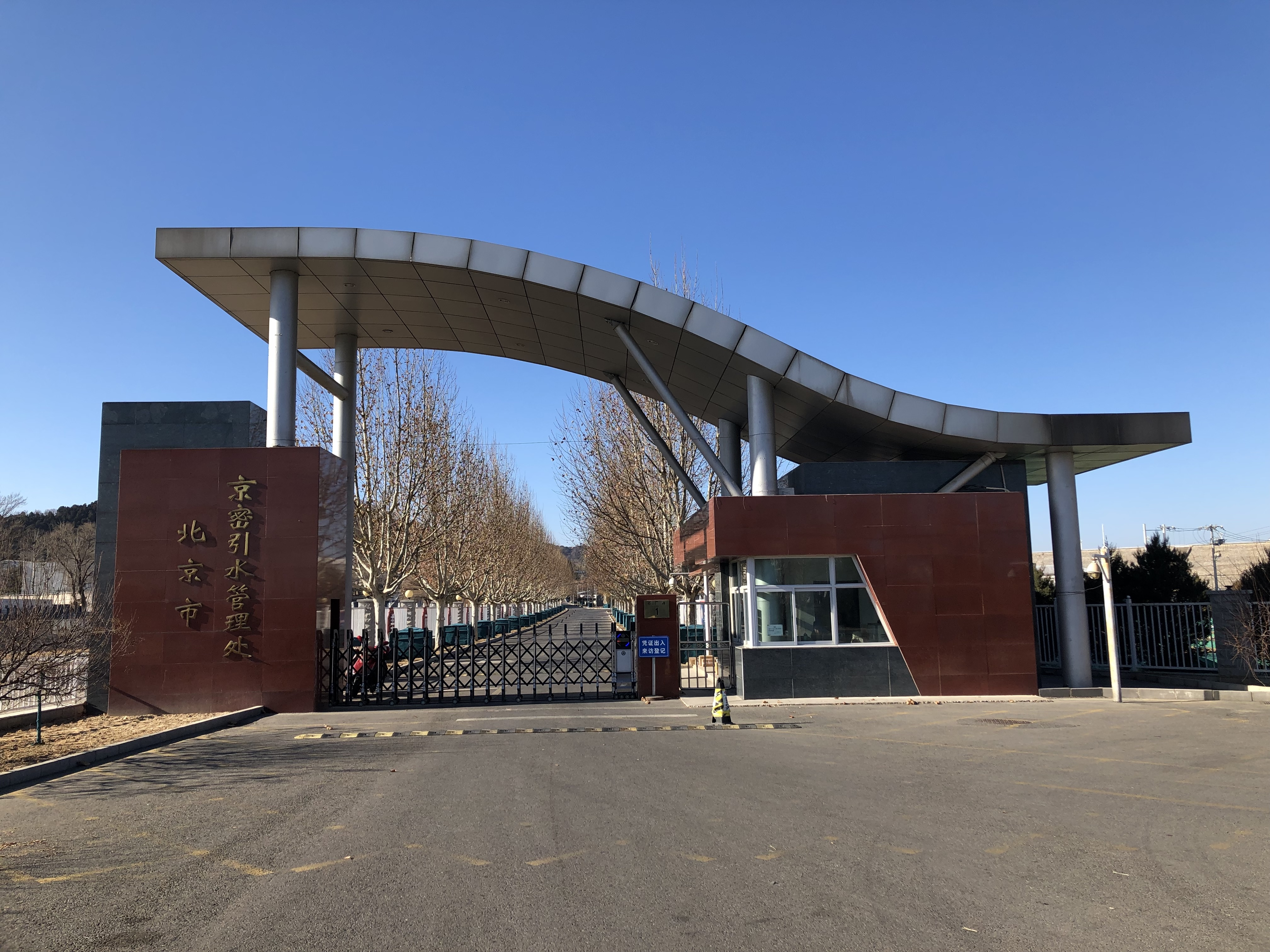
Entrance to Huairou Reservoir, 2018

== See also ==
- List of township-level divisions of Beijing
