= Longshan Subdistrict =

Longshan Subdistrict may refer to the following locations in the People's Republic of China:

Written as "龙山街道":

- Longshan Subdistrict, Beijing, in Huairou District, Beijing
- Longshan Subdistrict, Fuqing, in Fuqing, Fujian
- Longshan Subdistrict, Jia County, Henan, in Jia County, Henan
- Longshan Subdistrict, Linzhou, Henan, in Linzhou, Henan
- Longshan Subdistrict, Qiyang County, in Qiyang County, Hunan
- Longshan Subdistrict, Chaoyang, Liaoning, in Shuangta District, Chaoyang, Liaoning
- Longshan Subdistrict, Jimo, in Jimo, Shandong
- Longshan Subdistrict, Zhangqiu, in Zhangqiu, Shandong

Written as "龙山路街道":

- Longshan Road Subdistrict, Anqing, in Daguan District, Anqing, Anhui
- Longshan Road Subdistrict, Wendeng, in Wendeng, Shandong
- Longshan Road Subdistrict, Zaozhuang, in Shizhong District, Zaozhuang, Shandong
