= Changshaoying =

Changshaoying Manchu Ethnic Township 长哨营满族乡 ᠴᠠᠩ ᡧᠣᠣ ᠶᡝᠩ ᠮᠠᠨᠵᡠ ᡠᡴᠰᡠᡵᠠᡳ ᡤᠠᡧᠠᠨ
- Ethnic Township
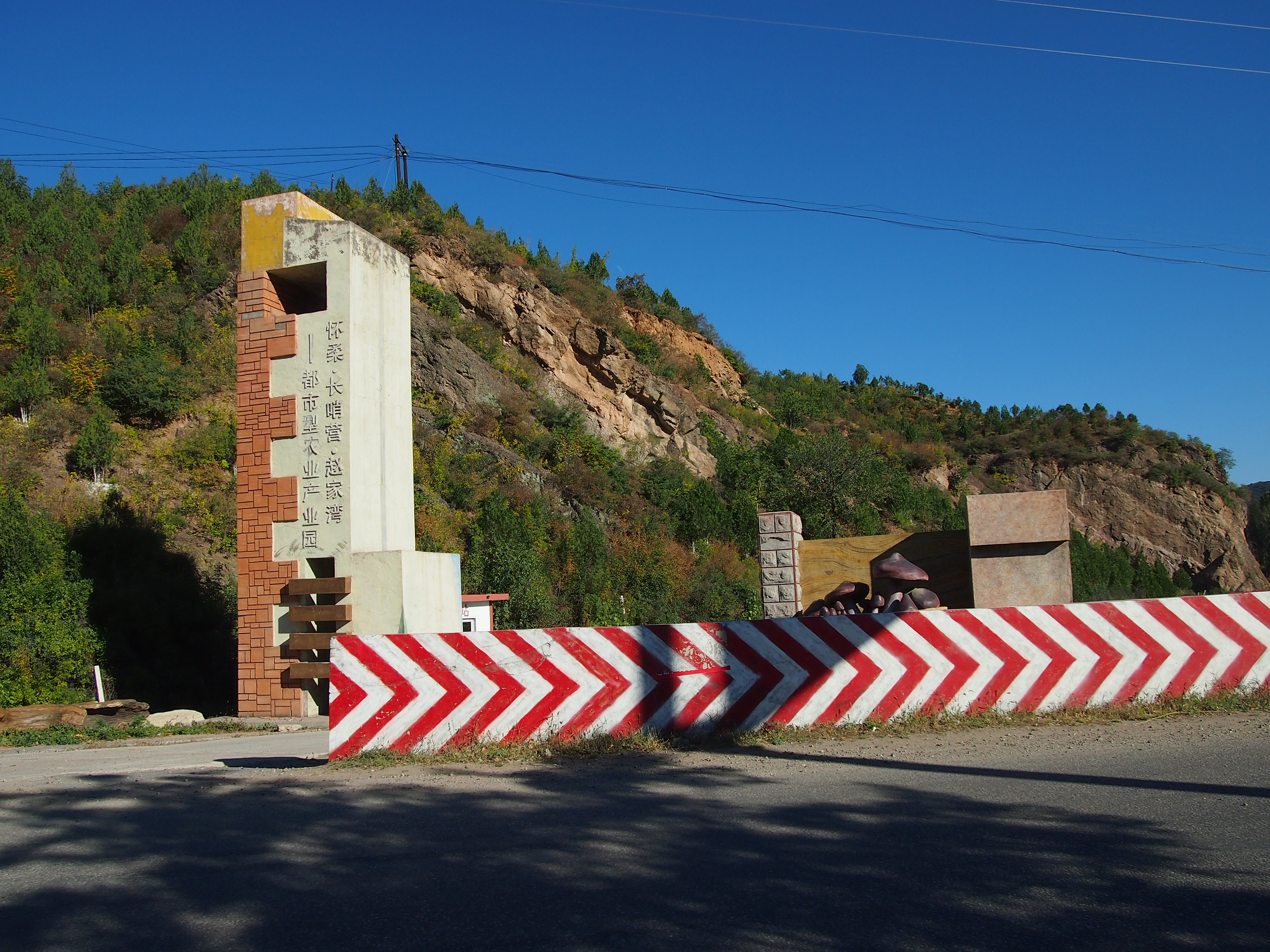
- Zhaojiawan Agricultural Park within the town, 2012

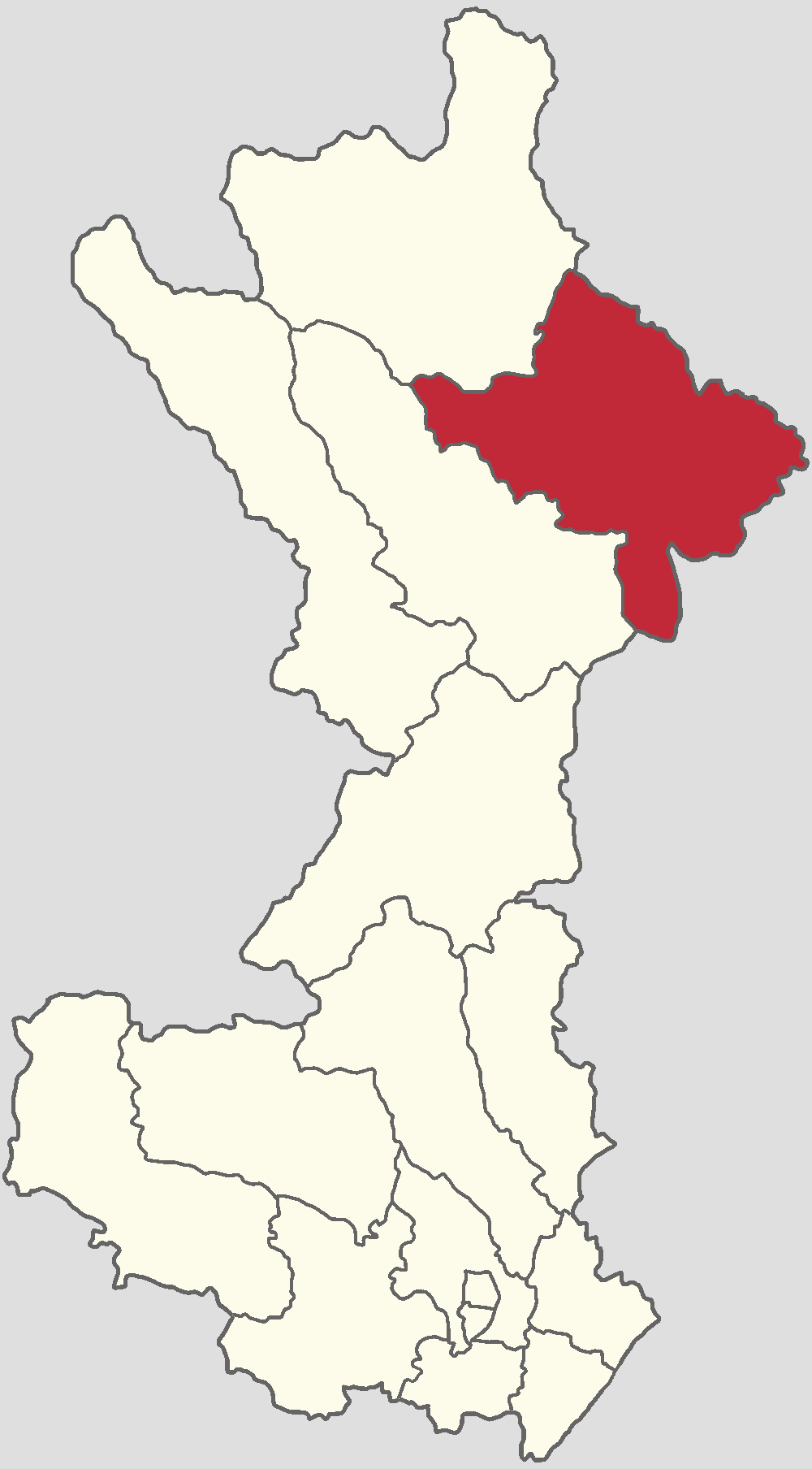
- Location in Huairou District

- Location within Beijing Location within China
- Coordinates: 40°47′34″N 116°44′35″E
- Country: China
- Municipality: Beijing
- District: Huairou
- Village-level Divisions: 24 villages

Area
  - Total: 249.6 km^{2} (96.4 sq mi)
- Elevation: 349 m (1,145 ft)

Population (2020)
  - Total: 5,378
  - Density: 21.55/km^{2} (55.81/sq mi)
- Time zone: UTC+8 (China Standard)
- Postal code: 101412
- Area code: 010

Changshaoying Manchu Ethnic Township (simplified Chinese: 长哨营满族乡; traditional Chinese: 長哨營滿族鄉; pinyin: Chángshàoyíng Mǎnzú Xiāng, Manchu: ᠴᠠᠩ
ᡧᠣᠣ
ᠶᡝᠩ
ᠮᠠᠨᠵᡠ
ᡠᡴᠰᡠᡵᠠᡳ
ᡤᠠᡧᠠᠨ, Möllendorff romanization: cang šoo yeng manju uksurai gašan) is an ethnic township situated in the northeastern portion of Huairou District, Beijing, China. It borders Hushiha Town in its northeast, Maquanzi Village in its east, Majiayu Town in its southeast, Tanghekou Town in its southwest, and Labagoumen Manchu Ethnic Township in its northwest. It had a population of 5,378 as of 2020. The name Changshaoying literally translates to "Long Whistle Barrack".

== History ==
Timeline of Changshaoying's History
Year	Status	Within
1908 – 1913		Luanping County, Chengde Prefecture
1913 – 1937		Luanping County, Rehe
1937 – 1945		Under Manchukuo
1945 – 1947	11th District	Luanping County, Rehe
1947–1952		Sihai County, Rehe
1952–1956	7th District	Huairou County, Hebei
1956–1958	Changshaoying Township; Beiwanzi Township	Huairou County, Hebei
1958–1960	Changshaoying Management Area, Gangtie People's Commune	Huairou County, Beijing
1960–1961	Qingshiling People's Commune	Huairou County, Beijing
1961–1983	Changshaoying People's Commune	Huairou County, Beijing
1983–1998	Changshaoying Township	Huairou County, Beijing
1998–2001	Changshaiying Manchu Ethnic Township (Merged with Qidaohe Manchu Ethnic Township in 1998)	Huairou County, Beijing
2001–present	Changshaiying Manchu Ethnic Township (Merged with Qidaohe Manchu Ethnic Township in 1998)	Huairou District, Beijing

== Administrative divisions ==
In 2021, Changshaoying Manchu Ethnic Township oversaw 24 villages under its administration:

Subdivision names	Name transliterations
东南沟	Dongnangou
老西沟	Laoxigou
长哨营	Changshaoying
遥岭	Yaoling
杨树湾	Yangshuwan
二道河	Erdaohe
三岔口	Sanchakou
大地	Dadi
榆树湾	Yushuwan
古洞沟	Gudonggou
七道梁	Qidaoliang
北湾	Beiwan
东辛店	Dongxindian
北干沟	Beigangou
四道河	Sidaohe
大沟	Dagou
项栅子	Xiangzhazi
七道河	Qidaohe
八道河	Badaohe
西沟	Xigou
后沟	Hougou
上孟营	Shangmengying
老沟门	Laogoumen
三道窝铺	Sandaowopu

== See also ==
- List of township-level divisions of Beijing
