= Huanghuacheng =

Huanghuacheng 黄花城村
- Village
- The Great Wall at Huanghuacheng

- Location in Beijing
- Coordinates: 40°24′31″N 116°20′42″E
- Country: People's Republic of China
- Municipality: Beijing
- District: Huairou
- Town: Jiuduhe (zh:九渡河镇)

Area
  - Total: 8.9 km^{2} (3.4 sq mi)

Population
  - Total: 1,098
  - Density: 120/km^{2} (320/sq mi)
- Time zone: UTC+8 (China Standard)

Huanghuacheng (simplified Chinese: 黄花城; traditional Chinese: 黃花城; pinyin: Huánghuāchéng) is a village in the town of Jiuduhe (九渡河镇), in the Huairou District of northern Beijing.

== Lakeside Great Wall ==
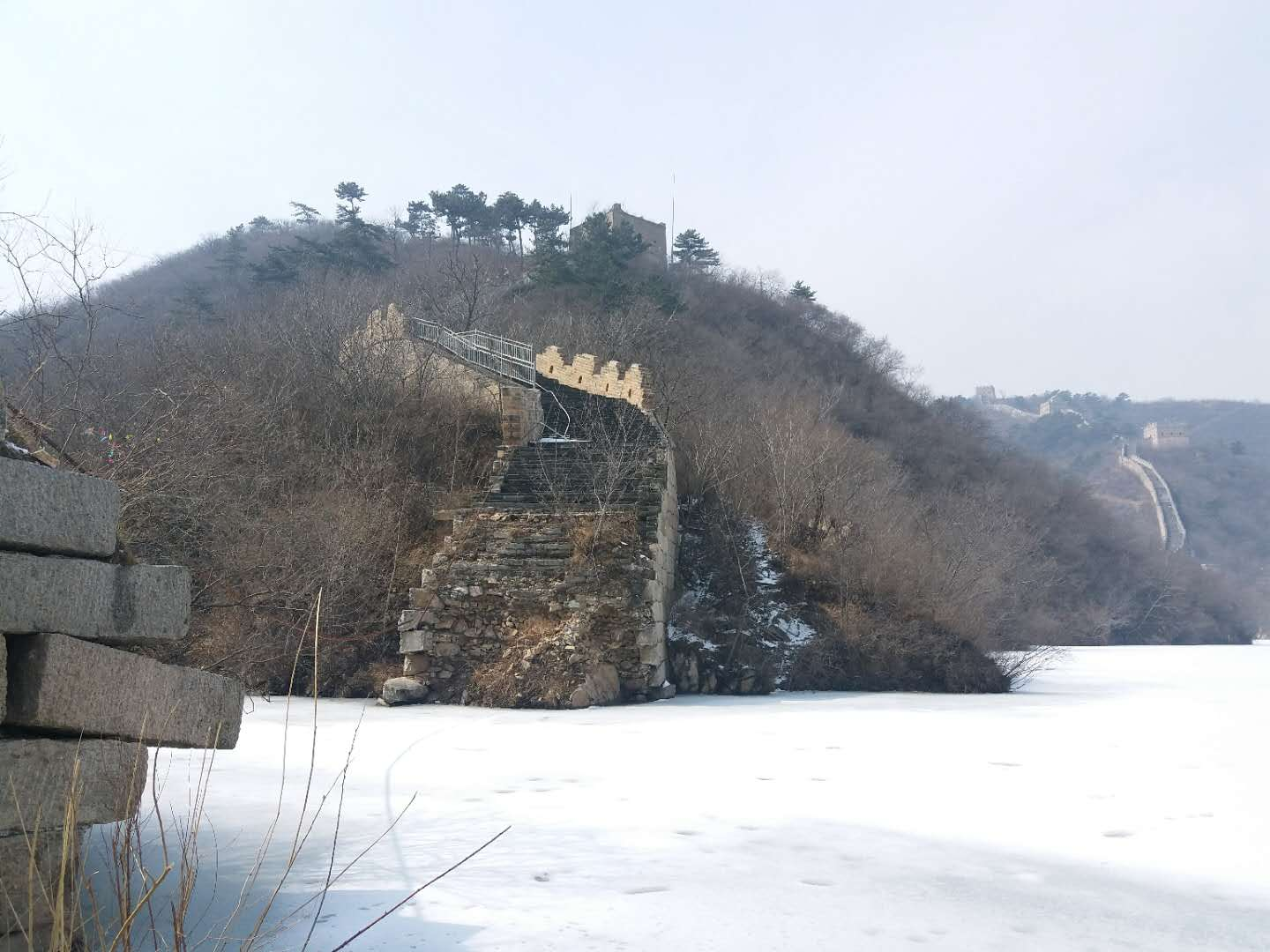
Submerged part of the Great Wall

The village is home to a tourist section of the Great Wall officially called the Lakeside Great Wall. The section derives its name from the man-made reservoir lakes at the location in close proximity to the Great Wall. Unlike the main tourist sections of the Great Wall at Mutianyu and Badaling, the Lakeside Great Wall only usually draws in a handful of tourists. The section features appealing sights including submerged parts of the Great Wall under the lake water and the view after a steep hike to a high guard tower.

== See also ==
- List of villages in China
