= Quanhe =

Quanhe may refer to:

- Chinese candy box (全盒), traditional at Chinese New Year
- Quanhe Subdistrict (泉河街道), Beijing
- Quanhe Port (圈河口岸), on one end of the Tumen River Bridge between China and North Korea
- Quan River (泉河), a major river in Henan
- Quanhe Village (泉河村) in Yangshi, Lianyuan, Hunan
