= Baoshan, Beijing =

Baoshan Town 宝山镇
- Town
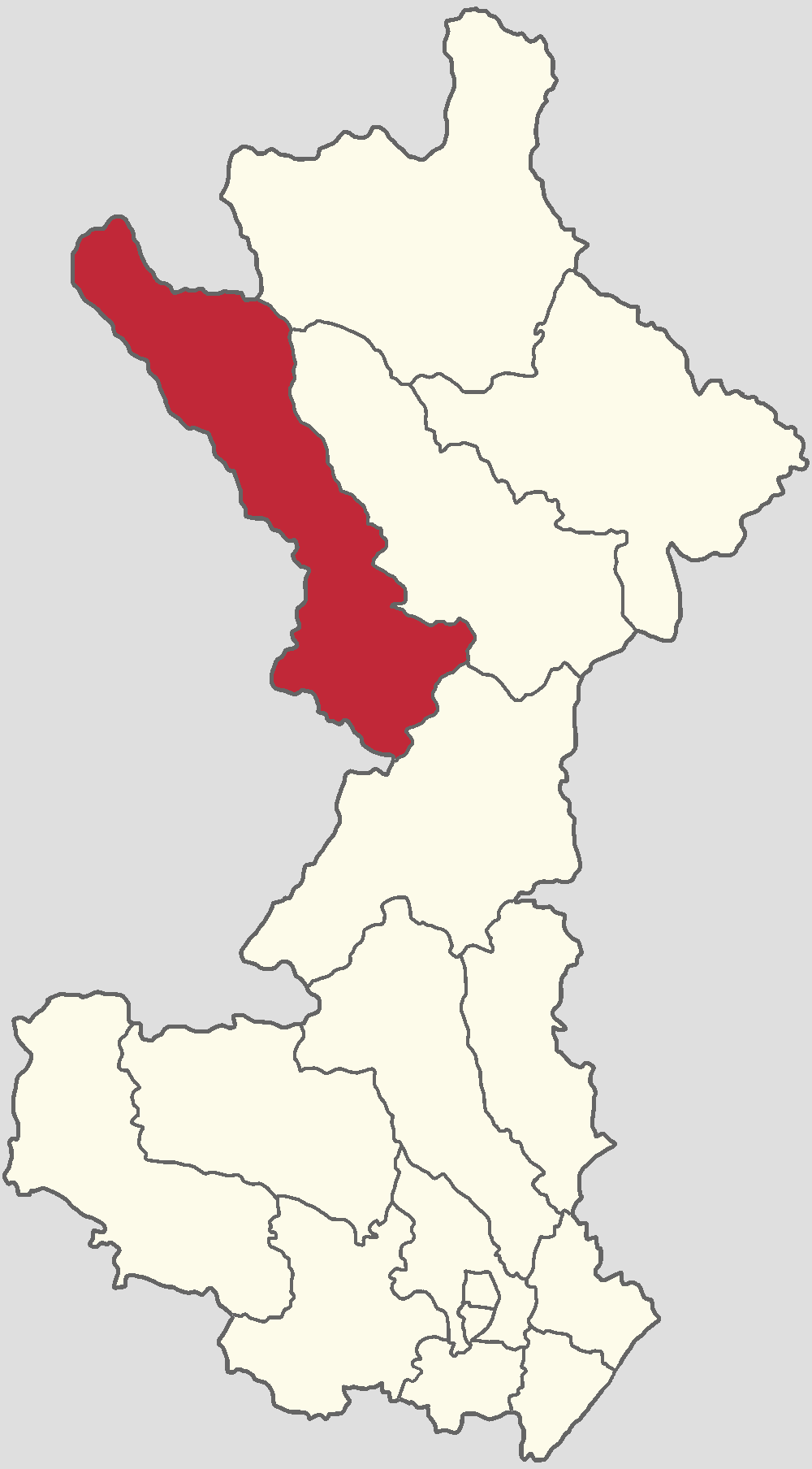
- Location within Huairou District

- Location within Beijing Location within China
- Coordinates: 40°41′37″N 116°33′49″E
- Country: China
- Municipality: Beijing
- District: Huairou
- Village-level Divisions: 25 villages

Area
  - Total: 248.6 km^{2} (96.0 sq mi)
- Elevation: 383 m (1,257 ft)

Population (2020)
  - Total: 6,246
  - Density: 25.12/km^{2} (65.07/sq mi)
- Time zone: UTC+8 (China Standard)
- Postal code: 101411
- Area code: 010

Baoshan Town (simplified Chinese: 宝山镇; traditional Chinese: 寶山鎮; pinyin: Bǎoshān Zhèn) is a town located on the northwestern portion of Huairou District, Beijing, China. It shares border with Yangmuzhazi Township and Labagoumen Manchu Ethnic Township in its north, Tanghekou Town in its east, Liulimiao Town and Zhenzhuquan Township in its south, as well as Qianjiadian and Dongmao Towns in its west. According to the 2020 census, it had a total population of 6,246. The name Baoshan translates to "Treasure Mountain".

== History ==
History of Baoshan Town
Year	Status	Part of
1644 – 1912		Luanping County, Chengde Prefecture
1912 – 1951		Luanping County, Rehe
1947 – 1952		Sihai County, Rehe
19 – 1956	6th District	Huairou County, Hebei
1956 – 1958	Baoshansi Township	Huairou County, Hebei
1958 – 1960	Baoshansi Production Team, Gangtie People's Commune	Huairou County, Beijing
1960 – 1961	Baoshansi Production Team, Qingshiling People's Commune	Huairou County, Beijing
1961 – 1983	Baoshansi People's Commune	Huairou County, Beijing
1983 – 2001	Baoshansi Township	Huairou County, Beijing
2001–present	Baoshan Town (Nianzi Township was added in 2001)	Huairou District, Beijing

== Administrative divisions ==
By 2021, Baoshan Town administered the following 25 villages:

Subdivision names	Name transliteration
宝山寺	Baoshansi
养渔池	Yangyuchi
超梁子	Chaoliangzi
对石	Duishi
西黄梁	Xihuangliang
盘道沟	Pandaogou
西帽山	Ximaoshan
牛圈子	Niuquanzi
大黄木厂	Da Huangmuchang
小黄木厂	Xiao Huangmuchang
下坊	Xiafang
转年	Zhuannian
杨树下	Yangshuxia
郑栅子	Zhengzhazi
温栅子	Wenzhazi
下栅子	Xiazhazi
四道河	Sidaohe
道德坑	Daodekeng
阳坡	Yangpo
松树台	Songshutai
四道窝铺	Sidao Wopu
碾子	Nianzi
菜树甸	Caishudian
三块石	Sankuaishi
江村	Jiangcun

== See also ==
- List of township-level divisions of Beijing
