= Labagoumen =

Labagoumen Manchu Ethnic Township 喇叭沟门满族乡 ᠯᠠᠪᠠᡤᠣᠮᡝᠨ ᠮᠠᠨᠵᡠ ᡠᡴᠰᡠᡵᠠᡳ ᡤᠠᡧᠠᠨ
- Ethnic Township
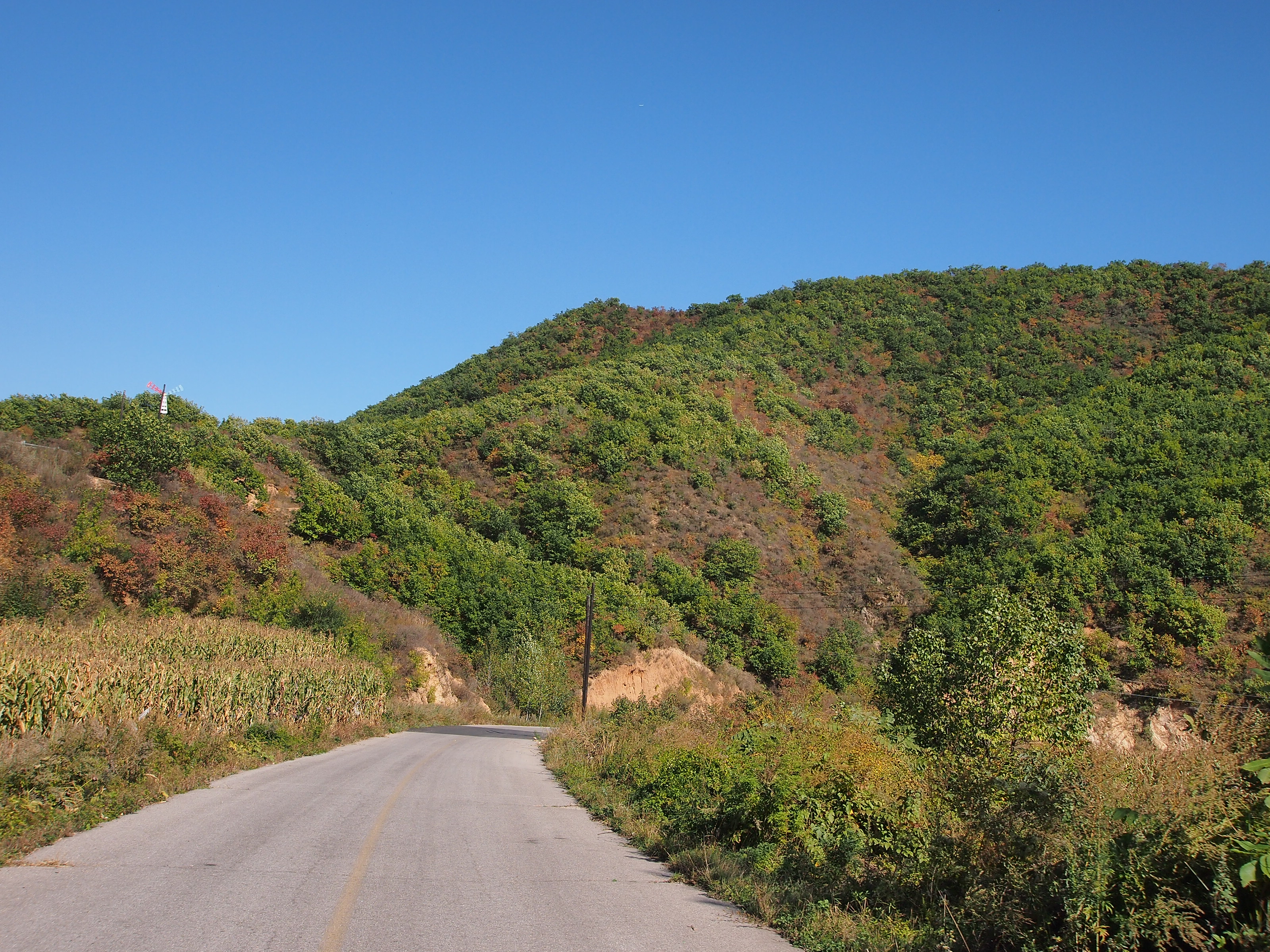
- Qian Labagou within the town, 2012

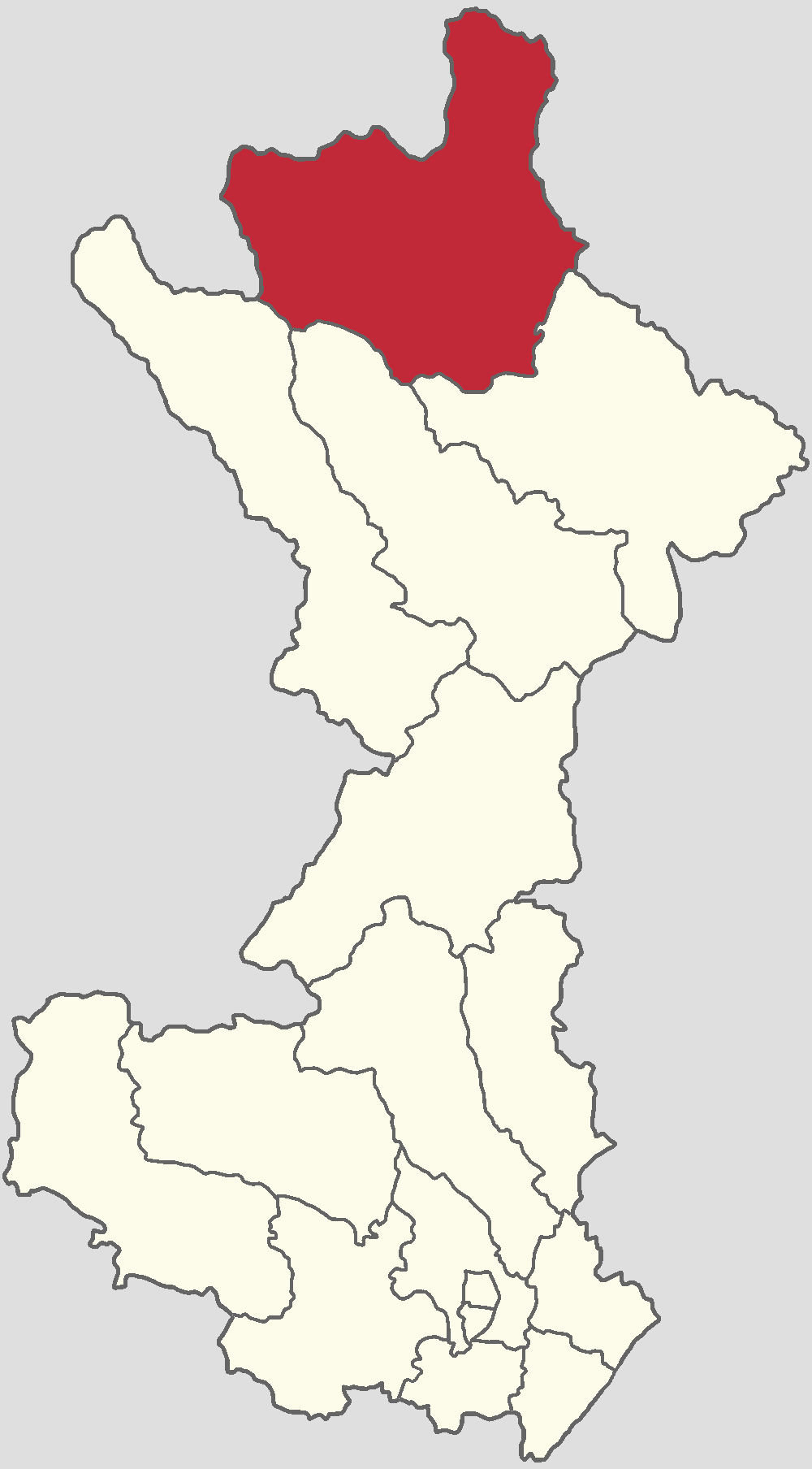
- Location of Labagoumen Manchu Ethnic Township in Huairou District

- Location within Beijing Location within China
- Coordinates: 40°54′03″N 116°36′58″E
- Country: China
- Municipality: Beijing
- District: Huairou
- Village-level Divisions: 15 villages

Area
  - Total: 302.3 km^{2} (116.7 sq mi)
- Elevation: 574 m (1,883 ft)

Population (2020)
  - Total: 4,034
  - Density: 13.34/km^{2} (34.56/sq mi)
- Time zone: UTC+8 (China Standard)
- Postal code: 101414
- Area code: 010

Labagoumen Manchu Ethnic Township (simplified Chinese: 喇叭沟门满族乡; traditional Chinese: 喇叭溝門滿族鄉; pinyin: Lǎbāgōumén Mǎnzú Xiāng) is an ethnic township in northern Huairou District, Beijing, China. It borders Yangmuzhazi and Tanghe Township to its northwest, Wudaoyingzi Manchu Ethnic Township to its east, Changshaoying Manchu Ethnic Township and Tanghekou Town to its south, and Baoshan Town to its southwest. The population of this ethnic township was 4,034 as of the 2020 census. The name Labagoumen (Chinese: 喇叭沟门; lit. 'Trumpet Ditch Gate') is referring to the place's geography at the foot of mountains, as the plain around Tang River widens southward like the opening of a trumpet.

== History ==
Timeline of Labagoumen Manchu Ethnic Township
Year	Status	Within
1912 – 1951		Luanping County, Rehe
1951 – 1952		Sihai County, Rehe
1952 – 1958		Huairou County, Hebei
1958 – 1961	Labagoumen Management Area, Gangtie People's Commune	Huairou County, Beijing
1961–1983	Labagoumen People's Commune	Huairou County, Beijing
1983–1984	Labagoumen Township	Huairou County, Beijing
1984–2001	Labagoumen Manchu Ethnic Township	Huairou County, Beijing
2001–present	Labagoumen Manchu Ethnic Township	Huairou District, Beijing

== Administrative divisions ==
As of 2023, Labagoumen Manchu Ethnic Township has direct jurisdiction over 15 villages:

Subdivision names	Name transliterations
帽山	Maoshan
胡营	Huying
四道穴	Sidaoxue
西府营	Xifuying
中榆树店	Zhongyushudian
下河北	Xiahebei
孙栅子	Sunzhazi
北辛店	Beixindian
苗营	Miaoying
官帽山	Guanmaoshan
喇叭沟门	Laba Goumen
大甸子	Dadianzi
东岔	Dongcha
对角沟门	Duijiao Goumen
上台子	Shangtaizi

== Gallery ==
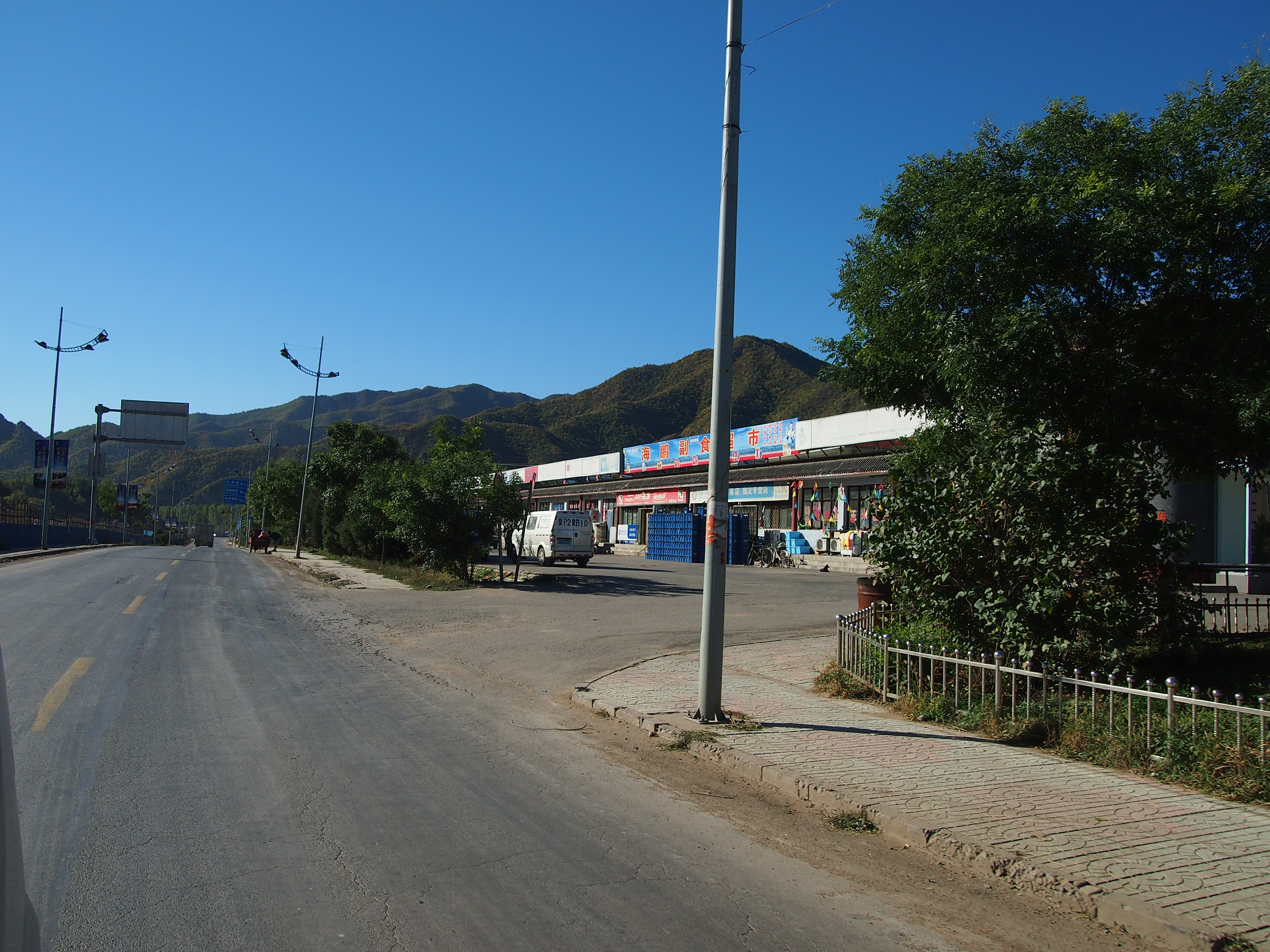
Jingjiajiu Road passing through the town, 2012

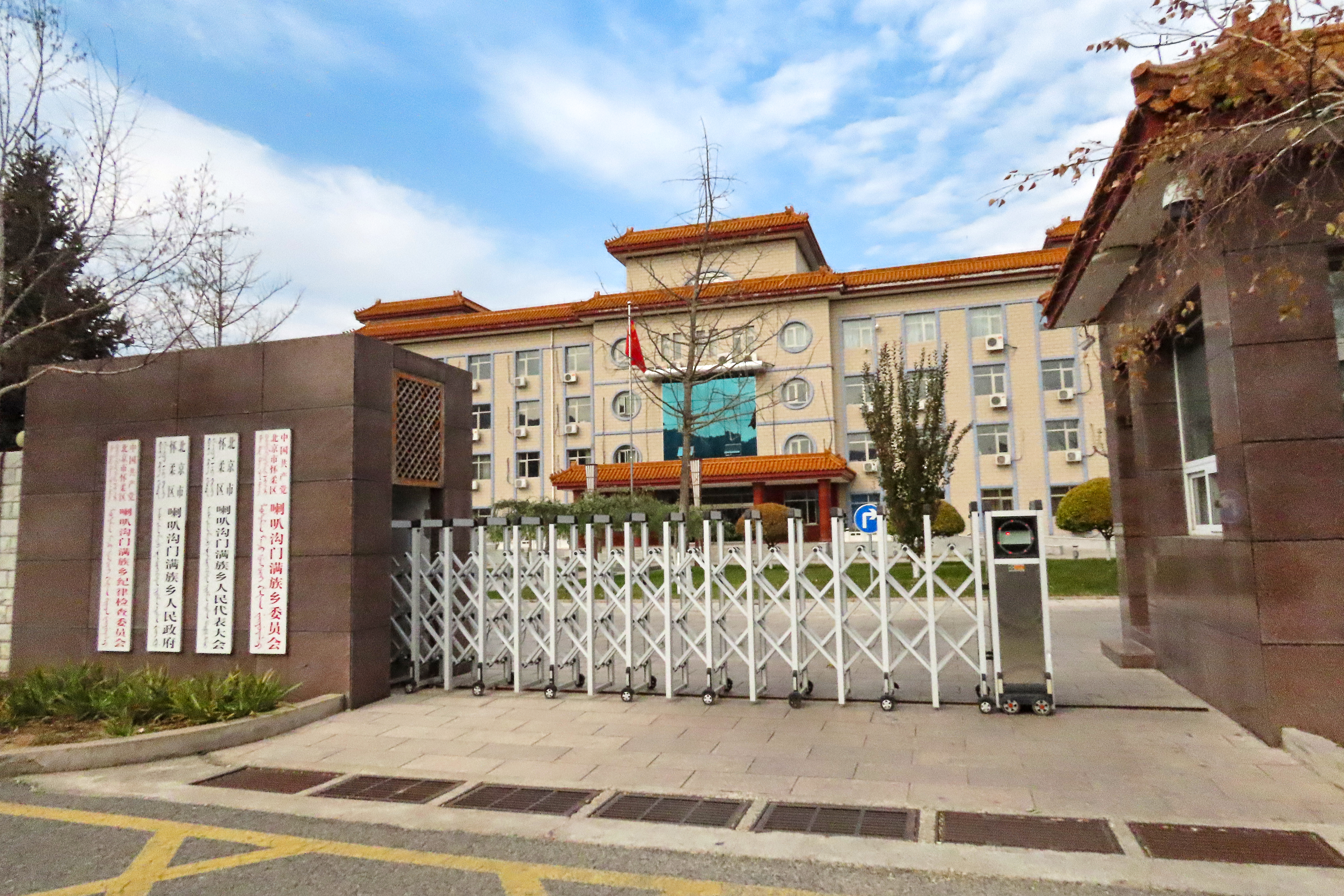
Government of Labagoumen, 2020

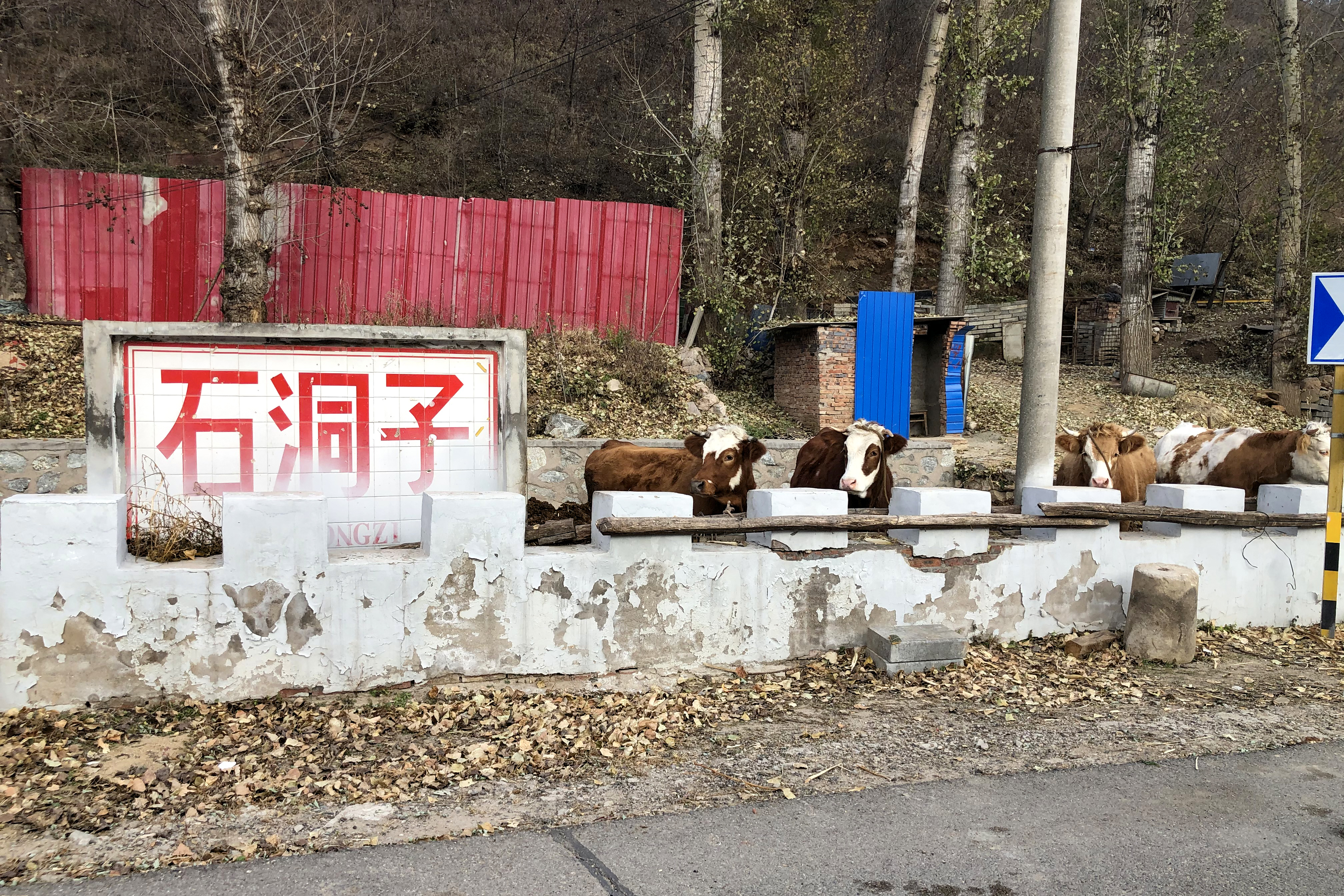
Shidongzi Village, the northernmost point of Beijing, 2020

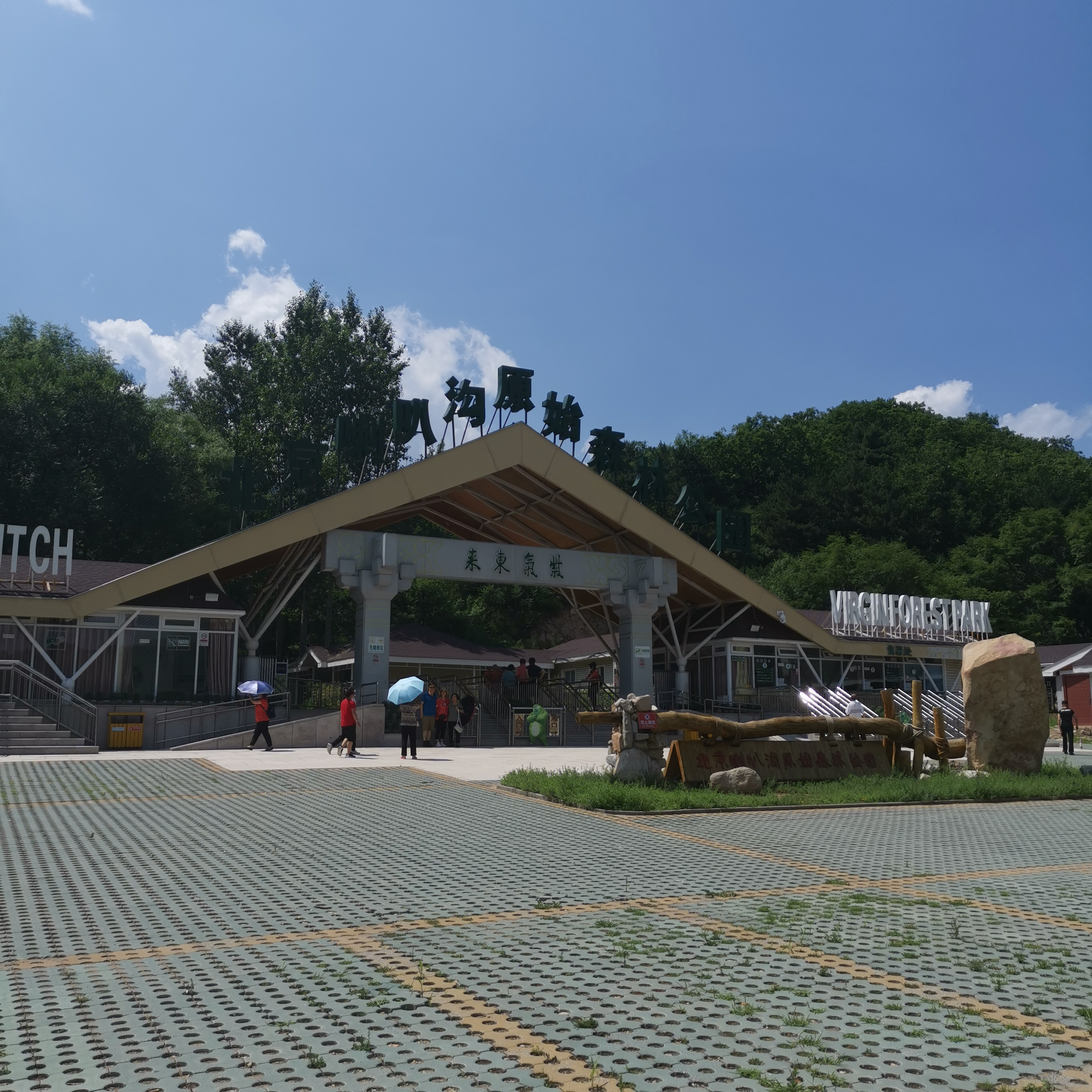
Entrance of Labagoumen Forest Park, 2019

== See also ==
- List of township-level divisions of Beijing
