= Jiuduhe =

Jiuduhe Town 九渡河镇
- Town
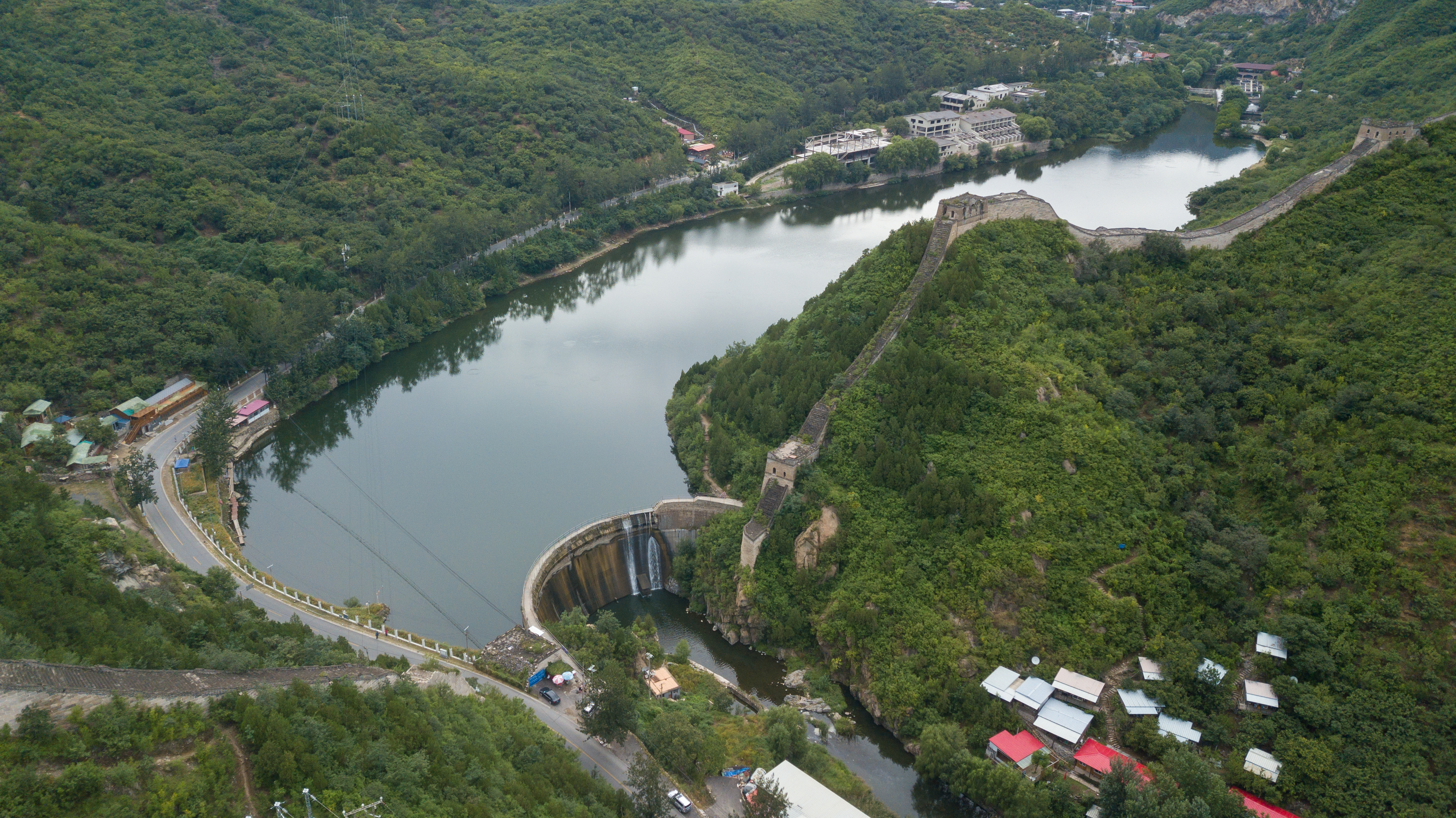
- Huanghuacheng Reservoir in Jiuduhe, 2019

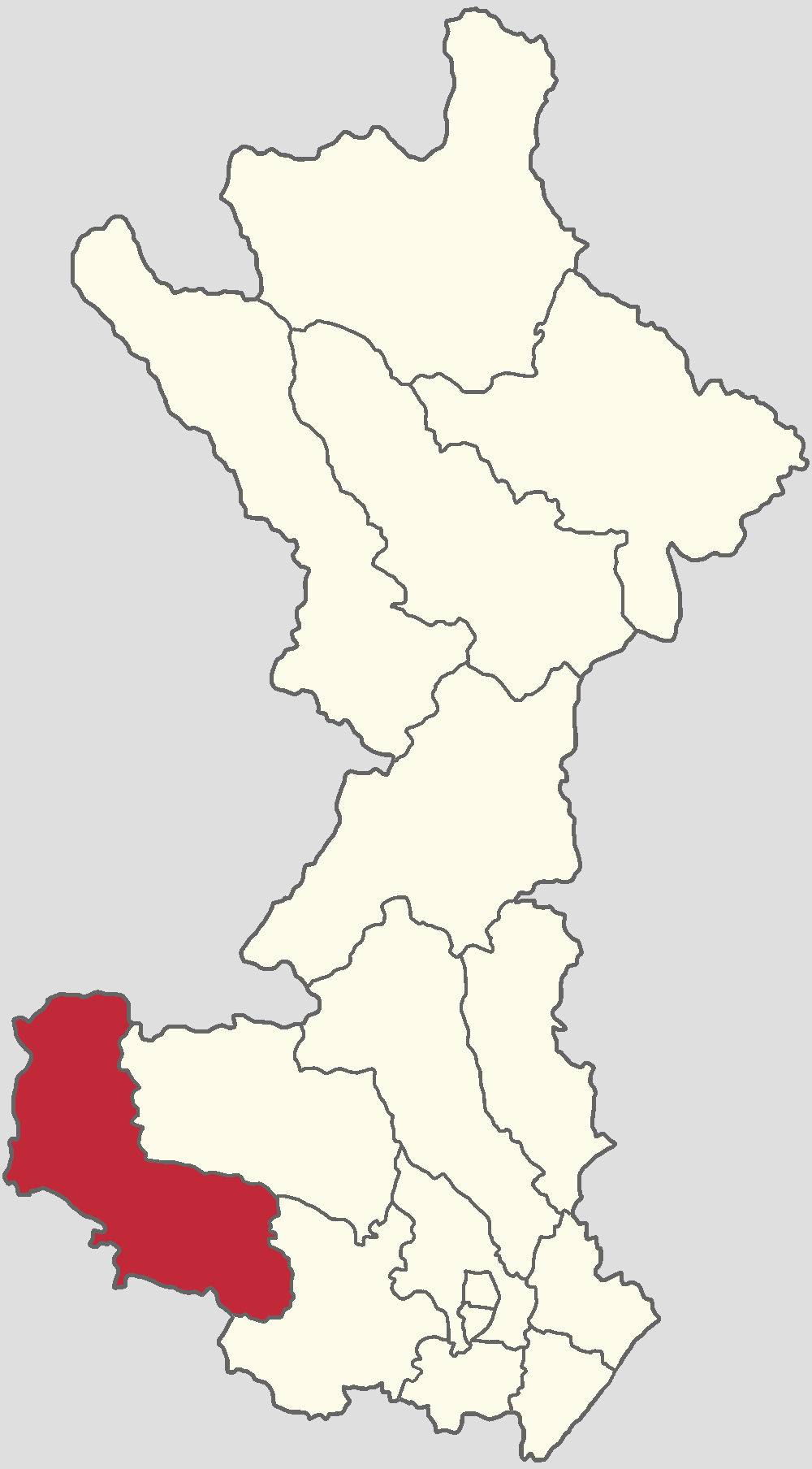
- Location in Huairou District

- Location within Beijing Location within China
- Coordinates: 40°21′34″N 116°27′14″E
- Country: China
- Municipality: Beijing
- District: Huairou
- Village-level Divisions: 18 villages

Area
  - Total: 177.6 km^{2} (68.6 sq mi)
- Elevation: 129 m (423 ft)

Population (2020)
  - Total: 12,533
  - Density: 70.57/km^{2} (182.8/sq mi)
- Time zone: UTC+8 (China Standard)
- Postal code: 101403
- Area code: 010

Jiuduhe Town (simplified Chinese: 九渡河镇; traditional Chinese: 九渡河鎮; pinyin: Jiǔdùhé Zhèn) is a town on southwestern Huairou District, Beijing, China. It shares border with Yongning and Sihai Towns in its north, Bohai and Qiaozi Towns in its east, Yanshou Town in its south, and Dazhuangke Township in its west. It had a population of 12,533 in 2020.

== History ==
Timetable of Jiuduhe Town
Time	Status	Part of
Ming and Qing dynasty		Changping Department, Shuntian Prefecture
1914 – 1945		Changping County, Capital Area
1945 – 1949		Huairou County, Capital Area
1949 – 1958		Huairou County, Hebei
1958 – 1961	Bayi People's Commune	Huairou County, Beijing
1961 – 1983	Huangkan People's Commune; Huanghuacheng People's Commune	Huairou County, Beijing
1983 – 1998	Huangkan Township; Huanghuacheng Township	Huairou County, Beijing
1998 – 2001	Jiuduhe Town	Huairou County, Beijing
2001–present	Jiuduhe Town	Huairou District, Beijing

== Administrative divisions ==
In 2021, Jiuduhe Town was composed of 18 villages:

Subdivision names	Name transliterations
四渡河	Siduhe
黄坎	Huangkan
吉寺	Jisi
团泉	Tuanquan
局里	Juli
花木	Huamu
九渡河	Jiuduhe
黄花镇	Huanghuazhen
东宫	Donggong
西台	Xitai
黄花城	Huanghuacheng
撞道口	Zhuangdaokou
石湖峪	Shihuyu
西水峪	Xishuiyu
二道关	Erdaoguan
杏树台	Xingshutai
庙上	Miaoshang
红庙	Hongmiao

== See also ==
- List of township-level divisions of Beijing
