= Huairou, Beijing =

Huairou 怀柔区 Hwaiju
- District
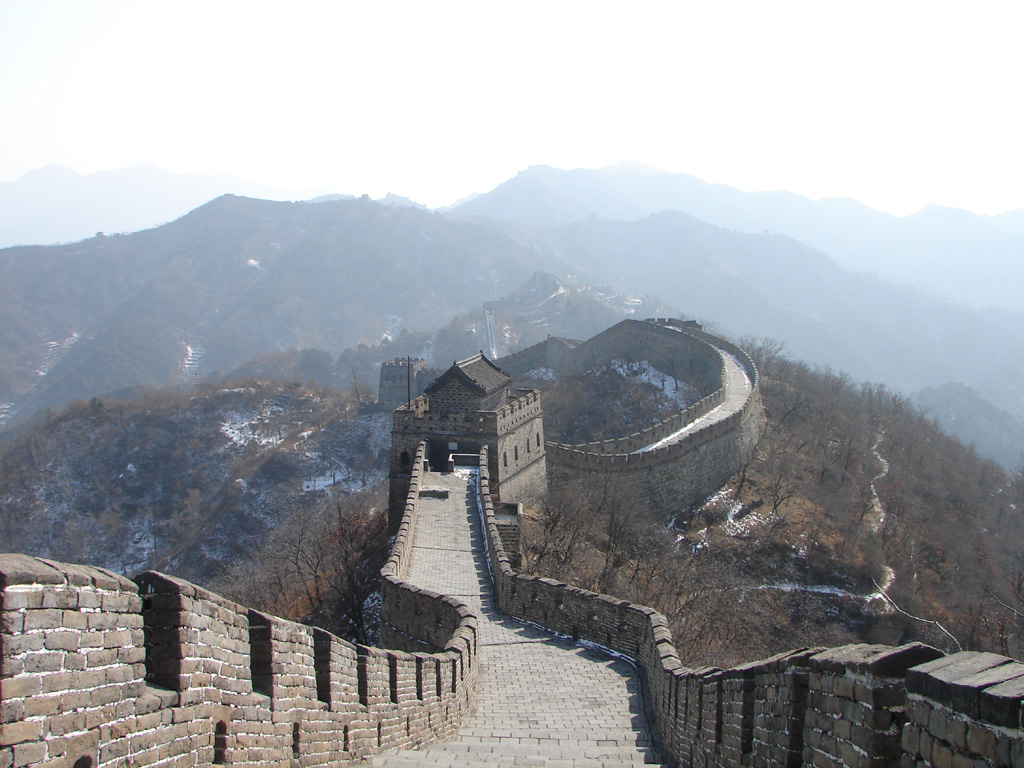
- Mutianyu Great Wall

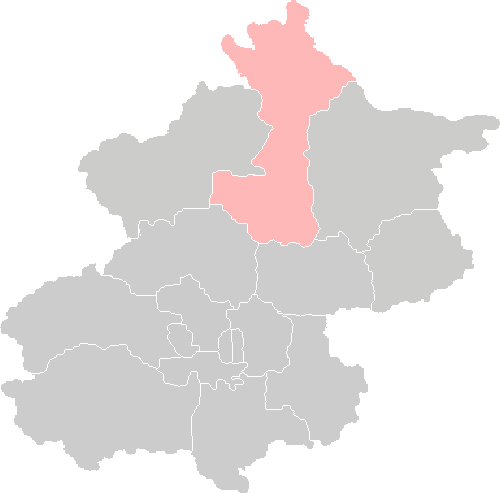
- Location of Huairou District in Beijing
- Interactive map of Huairou
- Coordinates: 40°18′58″N 116°37′55″E
- Country: People's Republic of China
- Municipality: Beijing
- Township-level divisions: 2 subdistricts 12 towns 2 ethnic townships

Area
  - Total: 2,557.3 km^{2} (987.4 sq mi)

Population (2020)
  - Total: 441,040
  - Density: 172.46/km^{2} (446.68/sq mi)
- Time zone: UTC+8 (China Standard)
- Area code: 0010
- Website: www.bjhr.gov.cn

Huairou District (Chinese: 怀柔区; pinyin: Huáiróu Qū) is situated in northern Beijing about 50 kilometres (31 mi) from the city centre.

== History ==
In 1995 during the United Nations' 4th World's Women Conference in Beijing, the Civil Society community was forced to meet in the Huairou district, an hour from the official proceedings, leading to a great deal of discontent, as many of the non-governmental actors present felt marginalized. In a tent at the Civil Society Village established especially for poor, grassroots women at the conference (organized by GROOTS International), the Huairou Commission, a registered non-governmental organization with a global secretariat in Brooklyn, NY, was established to ensure that grassroots women would have a voice at subsequent UN conferences and in other development processes.

Also in 1995, film industry began to develop in Yangsong, a town in the southeast of Huairou. China Film Group Corporation built its studio in Huairou in 2005.

In 2014, another international conference was held in Huairou: the APEC China 2014.

== Geography ==
Huairou District covers an area of 2,557.3 square kilometers (987.4 sq mi), 90 percent of which is mountainous area. Because of its 69% forest cover, the district is known as the natural "oxygen bar" of Beijing. In addition, it boasts a rich combination of plant, animal and tourism resources. Therefore, Huairou is of great importance to Beijing in ensuring the environmental quality and the ecosystem of the capital city.

Huairou's urban area (112,662 in township) has an estimated area of 11.5 km^{2} (4.4 sq mi) and an estimated population of 90,000.

=== Administrative divisions ===
There are 2 subdistricts, 12 towns, and 2 ethnic townships in the district.

Name	Chinese (S)	Hanyu Pinyin	Population (2010)	Area (km^{2})
Longshan Subdistrict (district government seat)	龙山街道	Lóngshān Jiēdào	44,203	7.50
Quanhe Subdistrict	泉河街道	Quánhé Jiēdào	54,471	5.10
Huairou town	怀柔镇	Huáiróu Zhèn	66,485	69.00
Yanqi town	雁栖镇	Yànqī Zhèn	25,933	154.08
Miaocheng town	庙城镇	Miàochéng Zhèn	34,027	32.70
Beifang town	北房镇	Běifáng Zhèn	24,541	42.10
Yangsong town	杨宋镇	Yángsòng Zhèn	24,642	30.50
Qiaozi town	桥梓镇	Qiáozǐ Zhèn	21,914	112.62
Huaibei town	怀北镇	Huáiběi Zhèn	12,475	104.72
Tanghekou town	汤河口镇	Tānghékǒu Zhèn	6,372	225.09
Bohai town	渤海镇	Bóhǎi Zhèn	14,016	192.02
Jiuduhe town	九渡河镇	Jiǔdùhé Zhèn	15,206	177.40
Liulimiao town	琉璃庙镇	Liúlímiào Zhèn	5,938	226.30
Baoshan town	宝山镇	Bǎoshān Zhèn	8,244	250.45
Changshaoying Manchu Ethnic Township	长哨营满族乡	Chángshàoyíng Mǎnzú Xiāng	6,570	249.43
Labagoumen Manchu Ethnic Township	喇叭沟门满族乡	Lǎbāgōumén Mǎnzú Xiāng	4,895	302.00

== Climate ==
Huairou District has a humid continental climate (Köppen climate classification Dwa). The average annual temperature in Huairou is 12.0 °C (53.6 °F). The average annual rainfall is 618.0 mm (24.33 in) with July as the wettest month. The temperatures are highest on average in July, at around 26.2 °C (79.2 °F), and lowest in January, at around −4.6 °C (23.7 °F).

Climate data for Huairou District, elevation 76 m (249 ft), (1991–2020 normals, extremes 1981–present)
Month	Jan	Feb	Mar	Apr	May	Jun	Jul	Aug	Sep	Oct	Nov	Dec	Year
Record high °C (°F)	14.1 (57.4)	24.9 (76.8)	29.6 (85.3)	34.9 (94.8)	40.7 (105.3)	41.2 (106.2)	41.3 (106.3)	37.9 (100.2)	36.9 (98.4)	31.4 (88.5)	24.8 (76.6)	17.1 (62.8)	41.3 (106.3)
Mean daily maximum °C (°F)	1.7 (35.1)	5.7 (42.3)	12.8 (55.0)	20.8 (69.4)	27.0 (80.6)	30.5 (86.9)	31.3 (88.3)	30.4 (86.7)	26.1 (79.0)	19.1 (66.4)	10.1 (50.2)	3.1 (37.6)	18.2 (64.8)
Daily mean °C (°F)	−4.6 (23.7)	−0.9 (30.4)	6.2 (43.2)	14.3 (57.7)	20.4 (68.7)	24.4 (75.9)	26.2 (79.2)	25.1 (77.2)	19.8 (67.6)	12.4 (54.3)	3.9 (39.0)	−2.9 (26.8)	12.0 (53.6)
Mean daily minimum °C (°F)	−9.7 (14.5)	−6.5 (20.3)	0.1 (32.2)	7.7 (45.9)	13.4 (56.1)	18.5 (65.3)	21.6 (70.9)	20.5 (68.9)	14.6 (58.3)	7.1 (44.8)	−0.9 (30.4)	−7.6 (18.3)	6.6 (43.8)
Record low °C (°F)	−22.4 (−8.3)	−18.1 (−0.6)	−12.4 (9.7)	−2.7 (27.1)	2.5 (36.5)	9.2 (48.6)	14.6 (58.3)	12.4 (54.3)	4.4 (39.9)	−5.5 (22.1)	−10.7 (12.7)	−17.9 (−0.2)	−22.4 (−8.3)
Average precipitation mm (inches)	2.6 (0.10)	5.5 (0.22)	9.4 (0.37)	19.8 (0.78)	43.6 (1.72)	78.0 (3.07)	205.9 (8.11)	143.6 (5.65)	65.7 (2.59)	27.6 (1.09)	13.3 (0.52)	3.0 (0.12)	618.0 (24.33)
Average precipitation days (≥ 0.1 mm)	1.3	2.0	3.1	4.5	6.6	10.5	14.3	11.1	8.0	5.1	3.1	1.9	71.5
Average snowy days	2.4	2.4	1.4	0.1	0	0	0	0	0	0	1.8	2.4	10.5
Average relative humidity (%)	47	45	43	44	51	62	75	76	72	64	57	50	57
Mean monthly sunshine hours	192.3	187.0	215.6	227.4	244.5	196.6	163.6	182.9	192.8	195.7	175.2	181.2	2,354.8
Percentage possible sunshine	64	62	58	57	55	44	36	44	52	58	59	63	54
Source: China Meteorological Administration All-time June low

Climate data for Tanghekou Town, elevation 332 m (1,089 ft), (1991–2020 normals)
Month	Jan	Feb	Mar	Apr	May	Jun	Jul	Aug	Sep	Oct	Nov	Dec	Year
Record high °C (°F)	13.3 (55.9)	24.1 (75.4)	30.1 (86.2)	34.8 (94.6)	40.4 (104.7)	41.8 (107.2)	40.9 (105.6)	39.3 (102.7)	38.0 (100.4)	32.0 (89.6)	26.6 (79.9)	18.3 (64.9)	41.8 (107.2)
Mean daily maximum °C (°F)	0.8 (33.4)	5.1 (41.2)	12.0 (53.6)	20.1 (68.2)	26.4 (79.5)	29.8 (85.6)	30.8 (87.4)	29.9 (85.8)	25.5 (77.9)	18.6 (65.5)	9.1 (48.4)	1.8 (35.2)	17.5 (63.5)
Daily mean °C (°F)	−8.5 (16.7)	−4.3 (24.3)	3.4 (38.1)	11.8 (53.2)	18.0 (64.4)	22.2 (72.0)	24.3 (75.7)	22.9 (73.2)	17.2 (63.0)	9.7 (49.5)	0.5 (32.9)	−7.0 (19.4)	9.2 (48.5)
Mean daily minimum °C (°F)	−15.5 (4.1)	−11.8 (10.8)	−4.5 (23.9)	3.6 (38.5)	9.5 (49.1)	15.3 (59.5)	19.0 (66.2)	17.6 (63.7)	11.0 (51.8)	2.9 (37.2)	−5.7 (21.7)	−13.3 (8.1)	2.3 (36.2)
Record low °C (°F)	−27.8 (−18.0)	−23.2 (−9.8)	−19.2 (−2.6)	−8.5 (16.7)	−1.6 (29.1)	5.6 (42.1)	10.1 (50.2)	7.0 (44.6)	−0.8 (30.6)	−10.6 (12.9)	−19.0 (−2.2)	−26.7 (−16.1)	−27.8 (−18.0)
Average precipitation mm (inches)	1.3 (0.05)	3.7 (0.15)	8.8 (0.35)	19.3 (0.76)	41.1 (1.62)	74.1 (2.92)	133.2 (5.24)	88.6 (3.49)	54.4 (2.14)	25.9 (1.02)	10.8 (0.43)	1.9 (0.07)	463.1 (18.24)
Average precipitation days (≥ 0.1 mm)	1.3	1.9	2.9	4.4	7.9	11.8	13.5	10.9	8.6	5.1	2.8	1.8	72.9
Average snowy days	2.1	2.2	2.0	0.3	0	0	0	0	0	0.1	2.1	2.0	10.8
Average relative humidity (%)	50	45	42	43	51	63	75	77	73	63	57	54	58
Mean monthly sunshine hours	205.3	201.0	238.3	251.2	270.6	236.7	214.6	228.1	224.4	215.1	188.4	195.5	2,669.2
Percentage possible sunshine	69	66	64	63	60	53	47	54	61	63	64	68	61
Source: China Meteorological Administration

== Economy ==
Its major agricultural products are chestnuts, walnuts, hawthorns, sweet pears, and apricots.

== Tourism ==
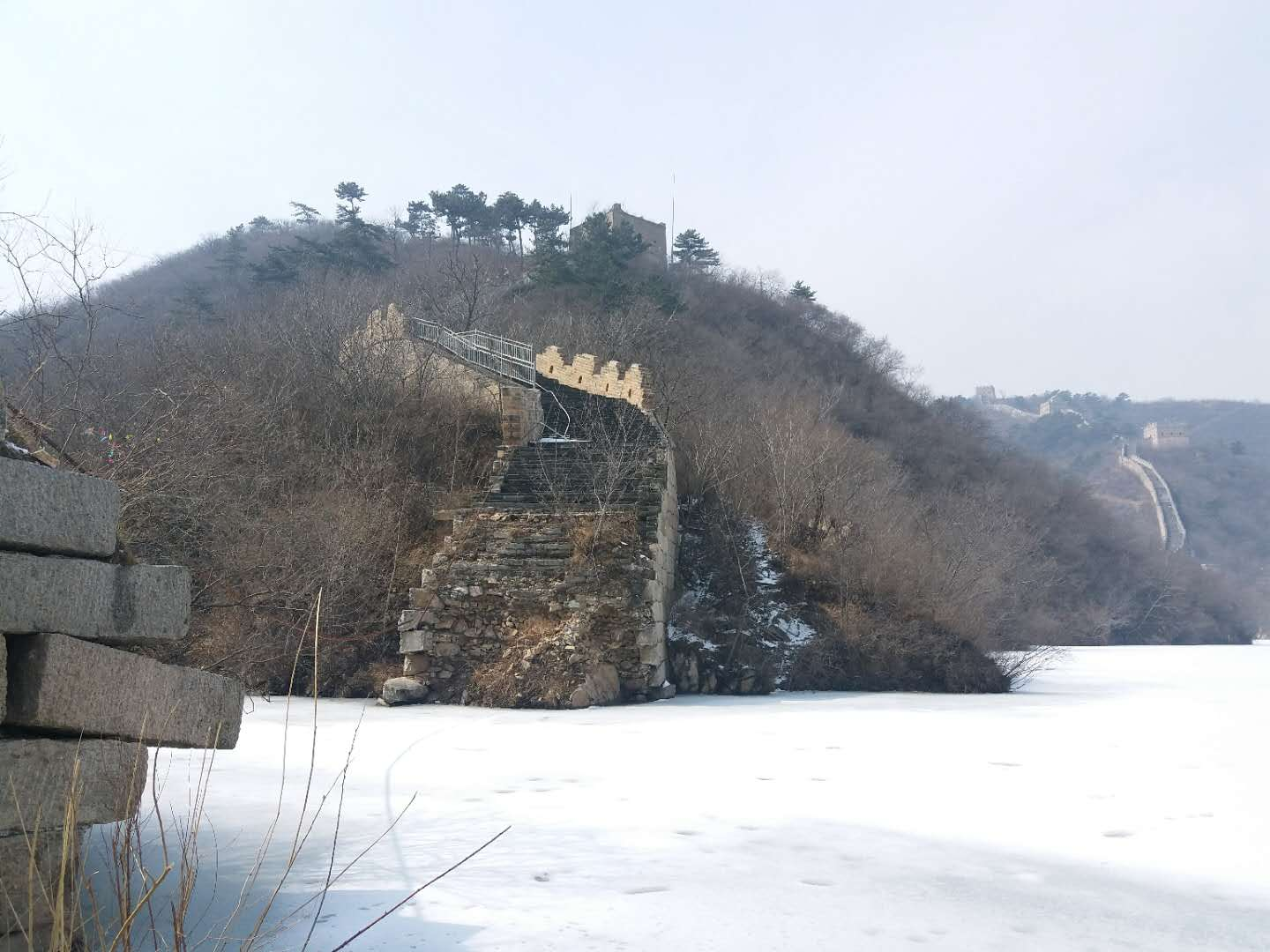
Submerged part of the Great Wall

The Great Wall of China runs through the district and some of the choicest tourist sections are located in the district. The portion known as Mutianyu is one of the most popular sections of the Great Wall for tourists. The Lakeside Great Wall in Huanghuacheng village, Jiuduhe is another tourist section known for the proximity of the Great Wall to man-made reservoir and even parts of the Great Wall are submerged under the lake water.

Another tourist attraction is Hong Luo Mountain on which the Hong Luo Temple is located.

Film-related attractions are aggregated in Yangsong, including China Film Group studio, Stellar Megamedia studio and Beijing Vintage Car Museum.

== Gallery ==
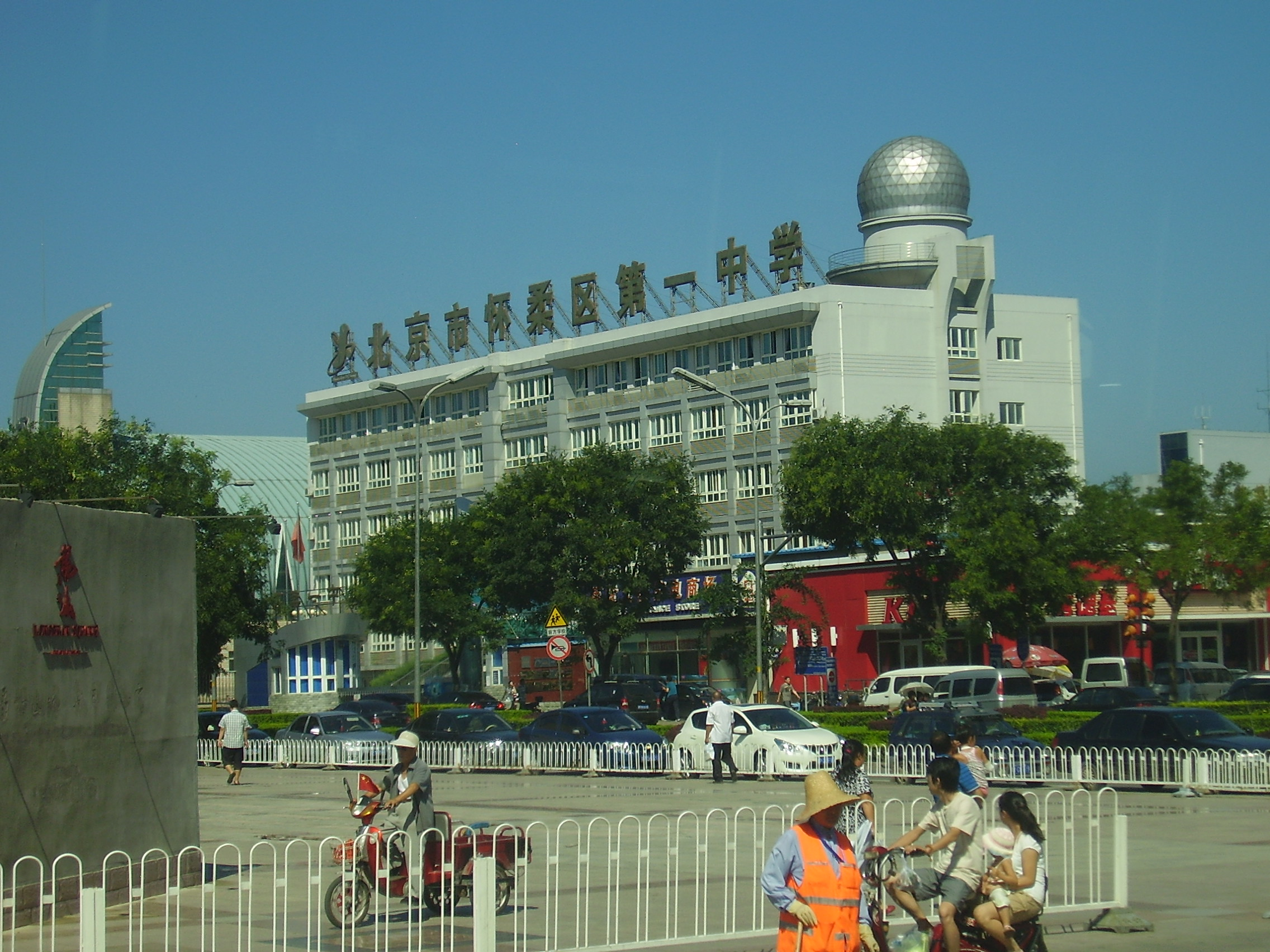
Huairou No.1 Middle School (北京市怀柔区第一中学)

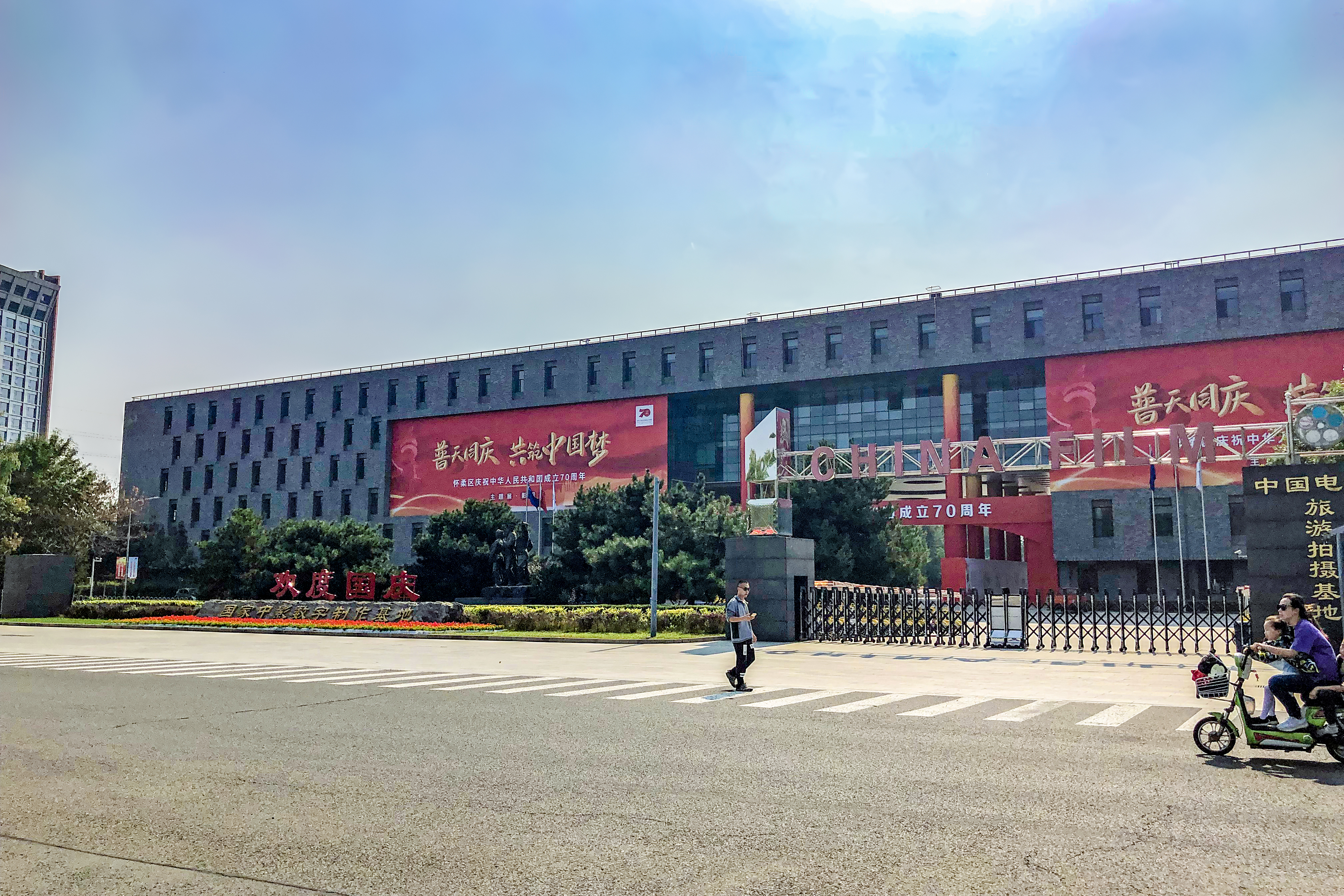
China Film Group Corporation studio in Yangsong, Huairou
