= Quanhe Subdistrict =

Quanhe Subdistrict 泉河街道
- Subdistrict
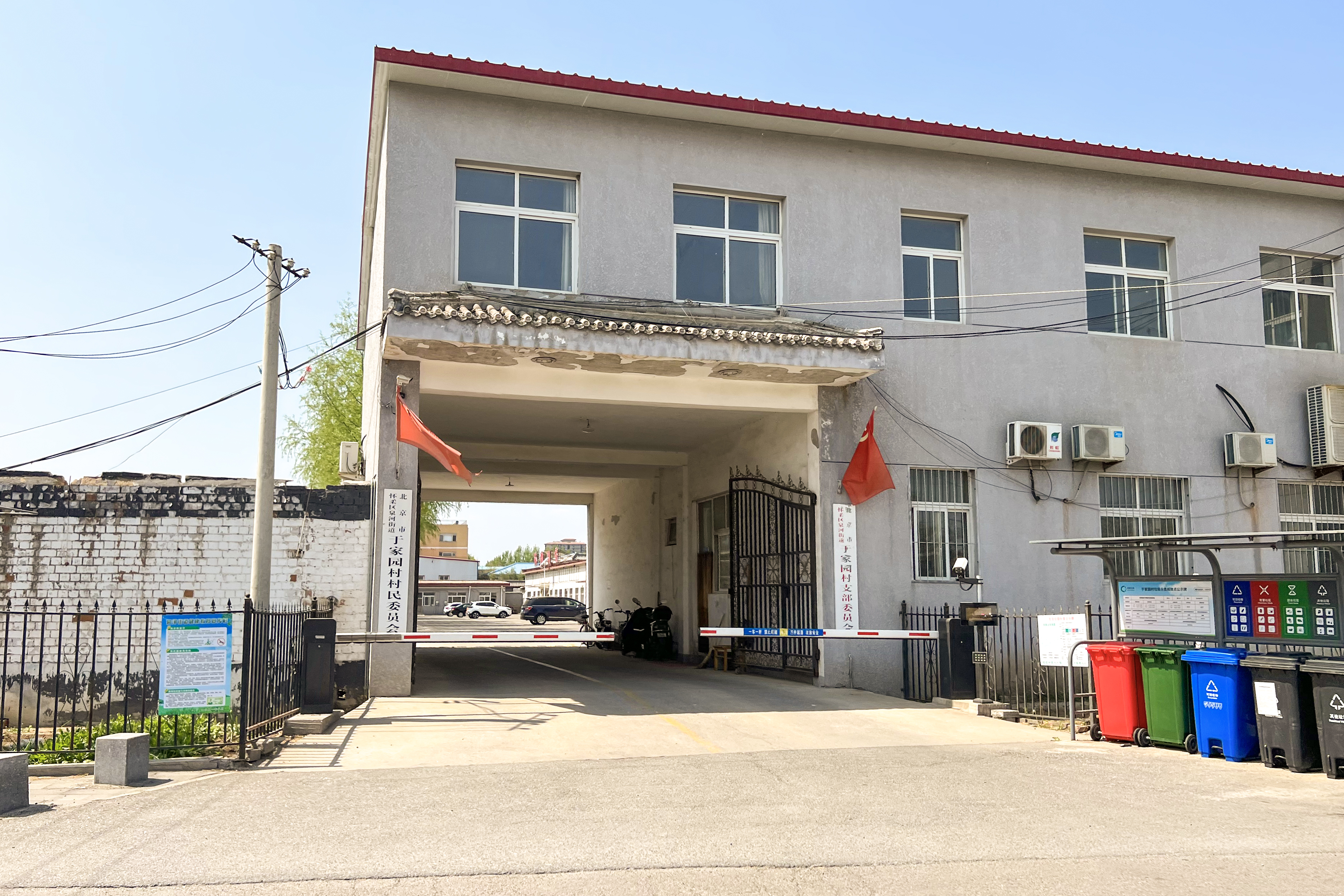
- Village Council of Yujiayuan, on the northeast of the subdistrict, 2022

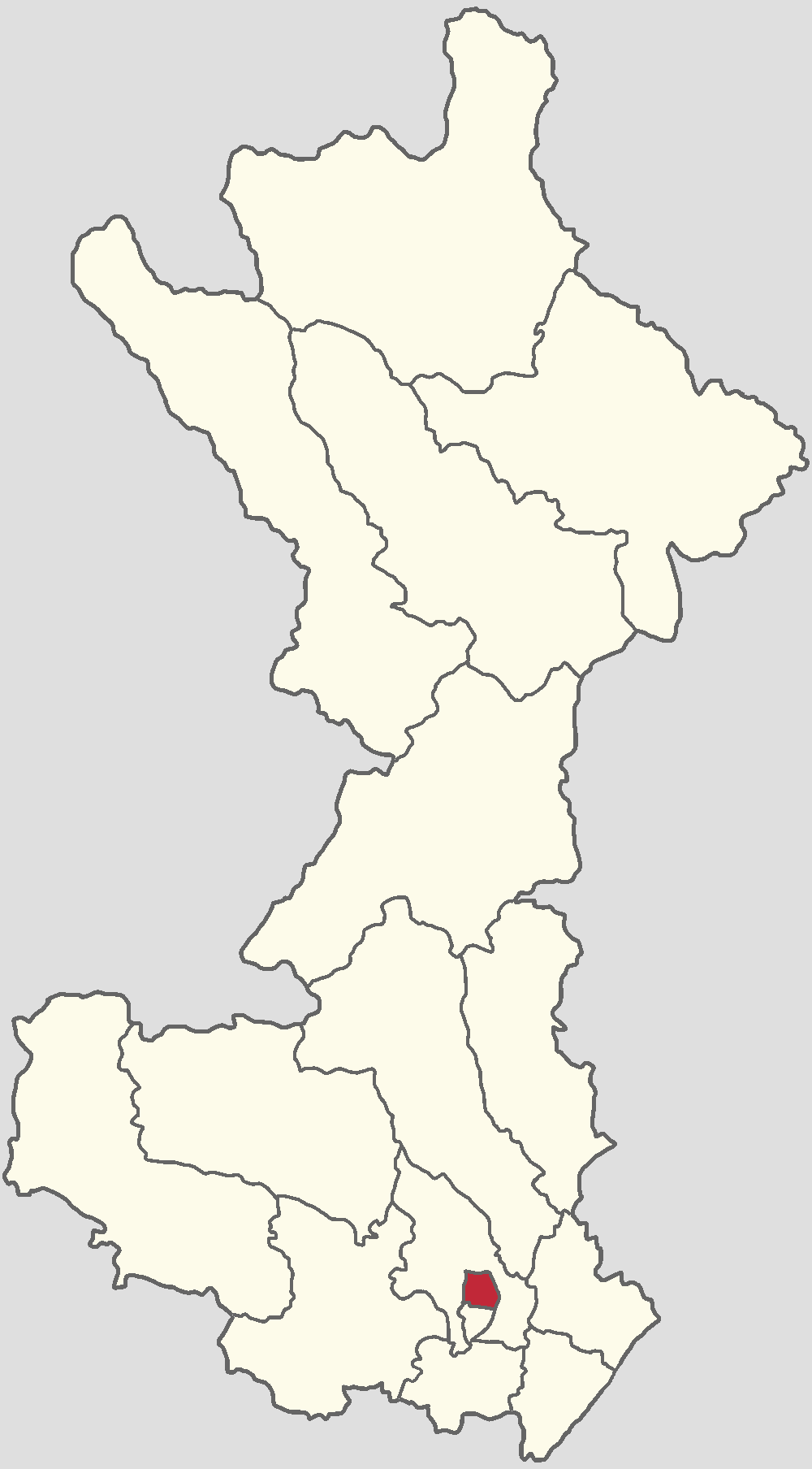
- Location within Huairou District

- Location within Beijing Location within China
- Coordinates: 40°19′13″N 116°37′41″E
- Country: China
- Municipality: Beijing
- District: Huairou
- Village-level Divisions: 12 communities 8 villages

Area
  - Total: 4.42 km^{2} (1.71 sq mi)
- Elevation: 62 m (203 ft)

Population (2020)
  - Total: 78,632
  - Density: 17,800/km^{2} (46,100/sq mi)
- Time zone: UTC+8 (China Standard)
- Postal code: 101422
- Area code: 010

Quanhe Subdistrict (Chinese: 泉河街道; pinyin: Quánhé Jiēdào) is a subdistrict situated in the south of Huairou District, Beijing, China. It is located to the north of Longshan Subdistrict, to the east of Huairou Reservoir, and is surrounded by Huairou Town to the other directions. In the year 2020, it had a total population of 78,632.

This subdistrict was founded in 2002. Its name, Quanhe, literally translates to "Spring River".

== Administrative divisions ==
In 2021, Quanhe Subdistrict consisted of 20 subdivisions — 12 communities and 8 villages:

Subdivision names	Name transliterations	Type
富乐	Fule	Community
富乐北里	Fule Beili	Community
滨湖	Binhu	Community
湖光	Huguang	Community
北园	Beiyuan	Community
杨家园	Yangjiayuan	Community
金台园	Jintaiyuan	Community
航天工程大学	Hangtian Gongcheng Daxue	Community
馥郁苑	Fuyuyuan	Community
于家园二区	Yujiayuan Erqu	Community
开放路	Kaifanglu	Community
新贤家园	Xinxian Jiayuan	Community
南大街	Nandajie	Village
新贤街	Xinxianjie	Village
后城街	Houchengjie	Village
钓鱼台	Diaoyutai	Village
潘家园	Panjiayuan	Village
杨家园	Yangjiayuan	Village
于家园	Yujiayuan	Village
小中富乐	Xiaozhong Fule	Village

== See also ==
- List of township-level divisions of Beijing
