= Longshan Subdistrict, Beijing =

Longshan Subdistrict 龙山街道
- Subdistrict
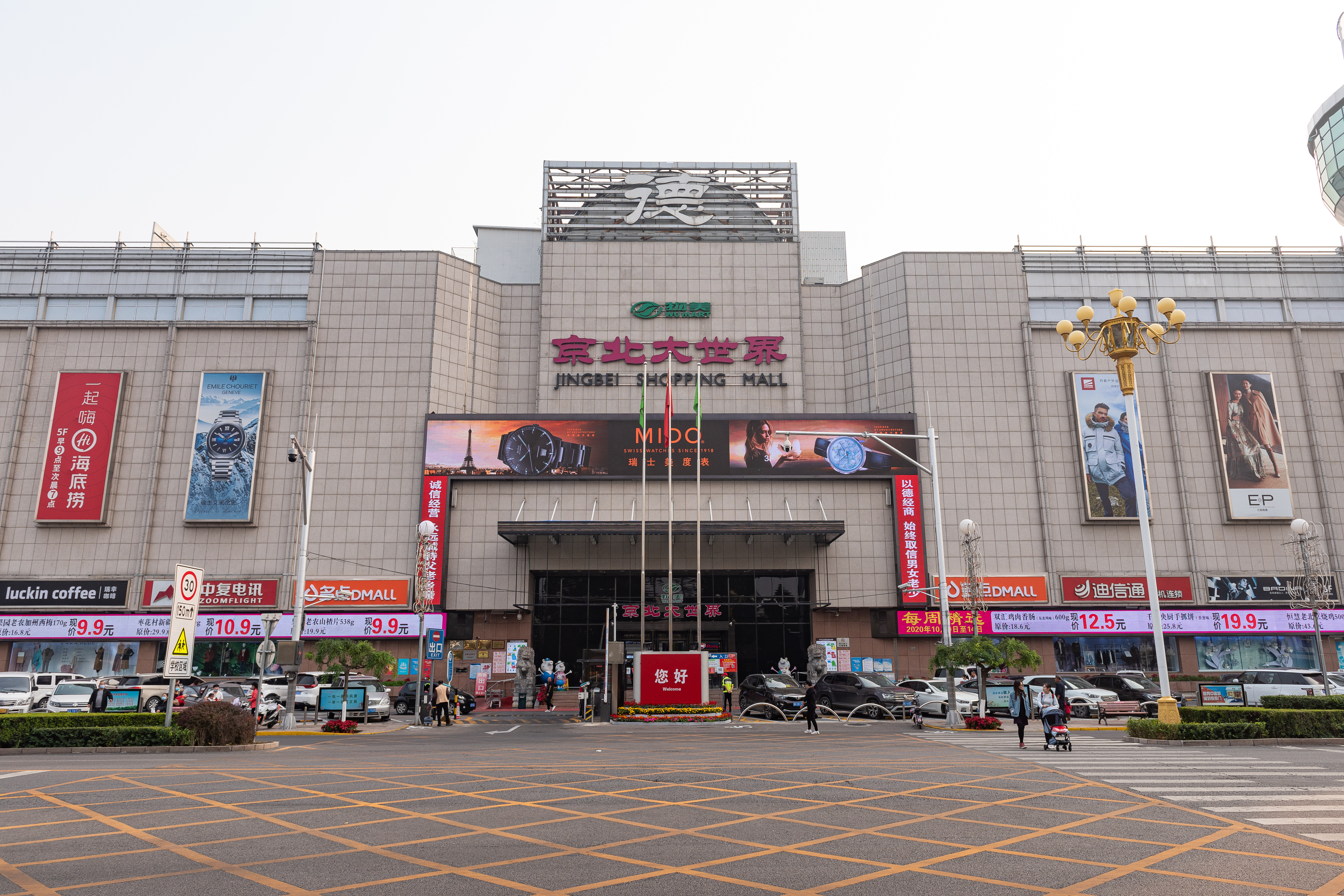
- Jingbei Shopping Mall within the subdistrict, 2020

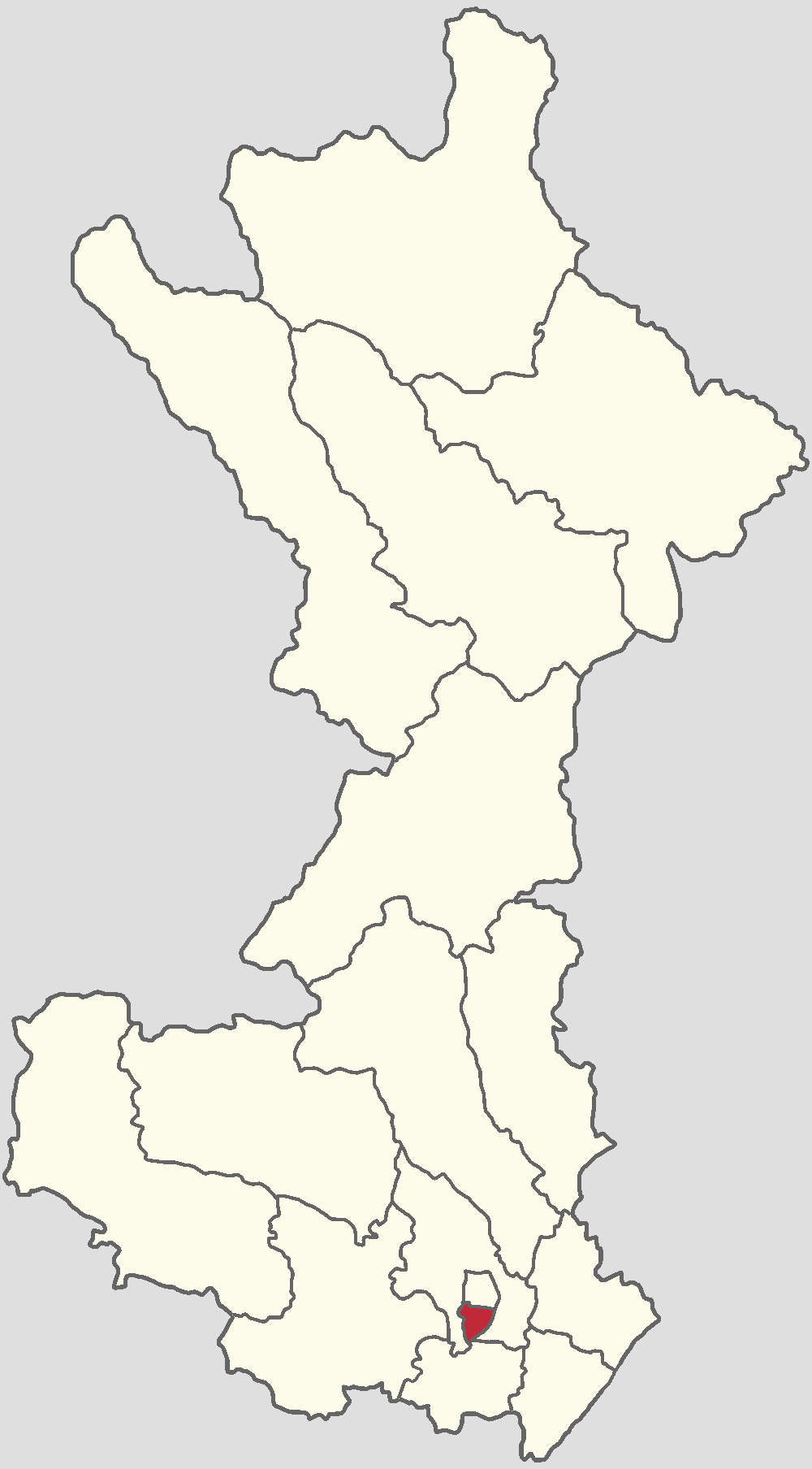
- Location within Huairou District

- Location within Beijing Location within China
- Coordinates: 40°18′54″N 116°37′37″E
- Country: China
- Municipality: Beijing
- District: Huairou
- Village-level Divisions: 12 communities 4 villages

Area
  - Total: 3.57 km^{2} (1.38 sq mi)
- Elevation: 52 m (171 ft)

Population (2020)
  - Total: 74,596
  - Density: 20,900/km^{2} (54,100/sq mi)
- Time zone: UTC+8 (China Standard)
- Postal code: 101401
- Area code: 010

Longshan Subdistrict (simplified Chinese: 龙山街道; traditional Chinese: 龍山街道; pinyin: Lóngshān Jiēdào) is a subdistrict situated in southern Huairou District, Beijing, China. It borders Quanhe Subdistrict in the north, Miaocheng Town in the south, and surrounded by Huairou Town in the east and west sides. It had a population of 74596 as of the 2020 census.

This subdistrict was formed in 2002. Its name, Longshan, literally translates to "Dragon Mountain".

== Subdivisions ==
As of 2021, Longshan Subdistrict has 16 subdivisions. Twelve are communities and four are villages:

Name	Transliteration	Type
商业街	Shangyejie	Community
南城	Nancheng	Community
车站路	Chezhanlu	Community
龙湖新村	Longhu Xincun	Community
南华园一区	Nanhuayuan Yiqu	Community
丽湖	Lihu	Community
南华园四区	Nanhuayuan Siqu	Community
望怀	Wanghuai	Community
西园	Xiyuan	Community
迎宾路	Yingbinlu	Community
南华园三区	Nanhuayuan Sanqu	Community
龙祥	Longxiang	Community
东关	Dongguan	Village
南关	Nanguan	Village
东大街	Dongdajie	Village
下元	Xiayuan	Village

== See also ==
- List of township-level divisions of Beijing
