= Bohai, Beijing =

Bohai Town 渤海镇
- Town
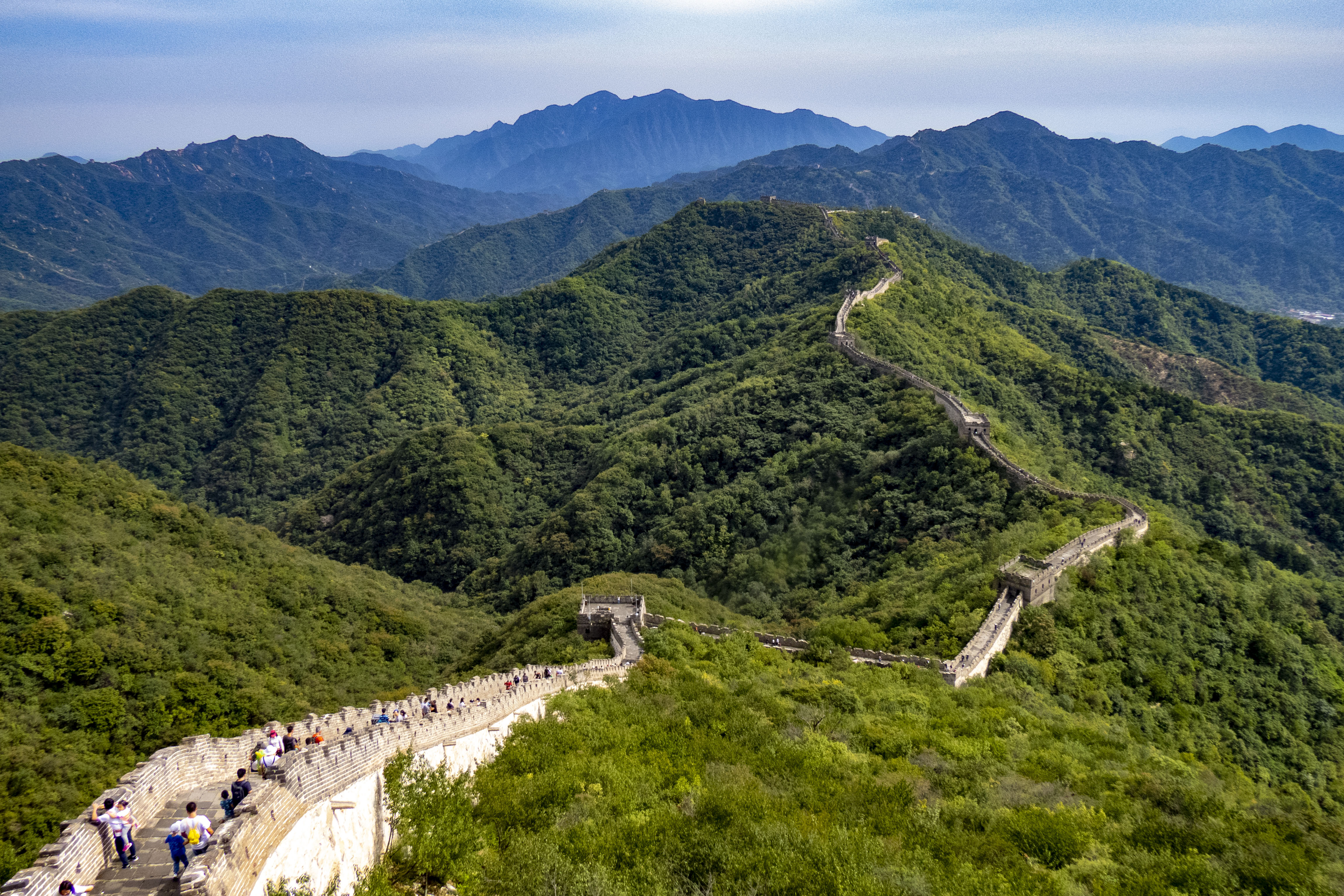
- Mutianyu section of the Great Wall, 2019

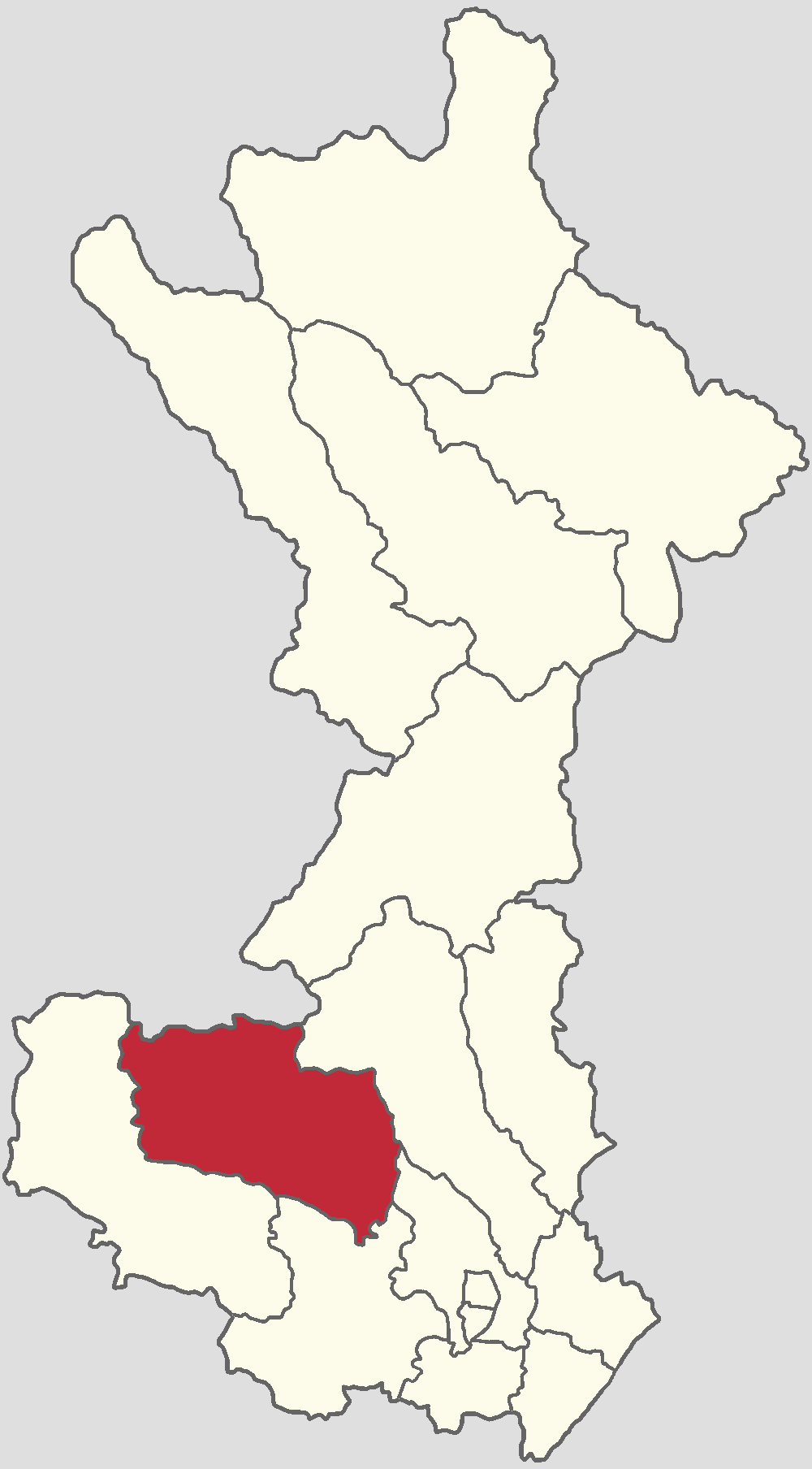
- Location within Huairou District

- Location within Beijing Location within China
- Coordinates: 40°24′49″N 116°27′40″E
- Country: China
- Municipality: Beijing
- District: Huairou
- Village-level Divisions: 21 villages

Area
  - Total: 152.3 km^{2} (58.8 sq mi)
- Elevation: 187 m (614 ft)

Population (2020)
  - Total: 12,702
  - Density: 83.40/km^{2} (216.0/sq mi)
- Time zone: UTC+8 (China Standard)
- Postal code: 101405
- Area code: 010

Bohai Town (simplified Chinese: 渤海镇; traditional Chinese: 渤海鎮; pinyin: Bóhǎi Zhèn), is a town located on southwestern Huairou District, Beijing, China. Situated inside a valley, It borders Sihai Town to its north, Yanqi and Huairou Towns to its east, Qiaozi Town to its south, and Jiuduhe Town to its southwest. In 2020, the census counted12,702 residents for this town .

The town was officially created in 1998. Its name came from the early settlers who were from Balhae (渤海) during the Tang dynasty.

== Administrative divisions ==
As of 2021, Bohai Town was divided into 21 villages:

Subdivision names	Name transliteration
渤海所	Bohaisuo
景峪	Jingyu
龙泉庄	Longquanzuang
白木	Baimu
沙峪	Shayu
南冶	Nanzhi
洞台	Dongtai
铁矿峪	Tiekuangyu
大榛峪	Dazhenyu
庄户	Zhuanghu
三岔	Sancha
兴隆城	Xinglongcheng
六渡河	Liuduhe
四渡河	Siduhe
三渡河	Sanduhe
马道峪	Madaoyu
苇店	Weidian
辛营	Xinying
北沟	Beigou
田仙峪	Tianxianyu
慕田峪	Mutianyu

== Landmark ==
- Mutianyu

== See also ==
- List of township-level divisions of Beijing
