= Tanghekou =

Tanghekou Town 汤河口镇
- Town
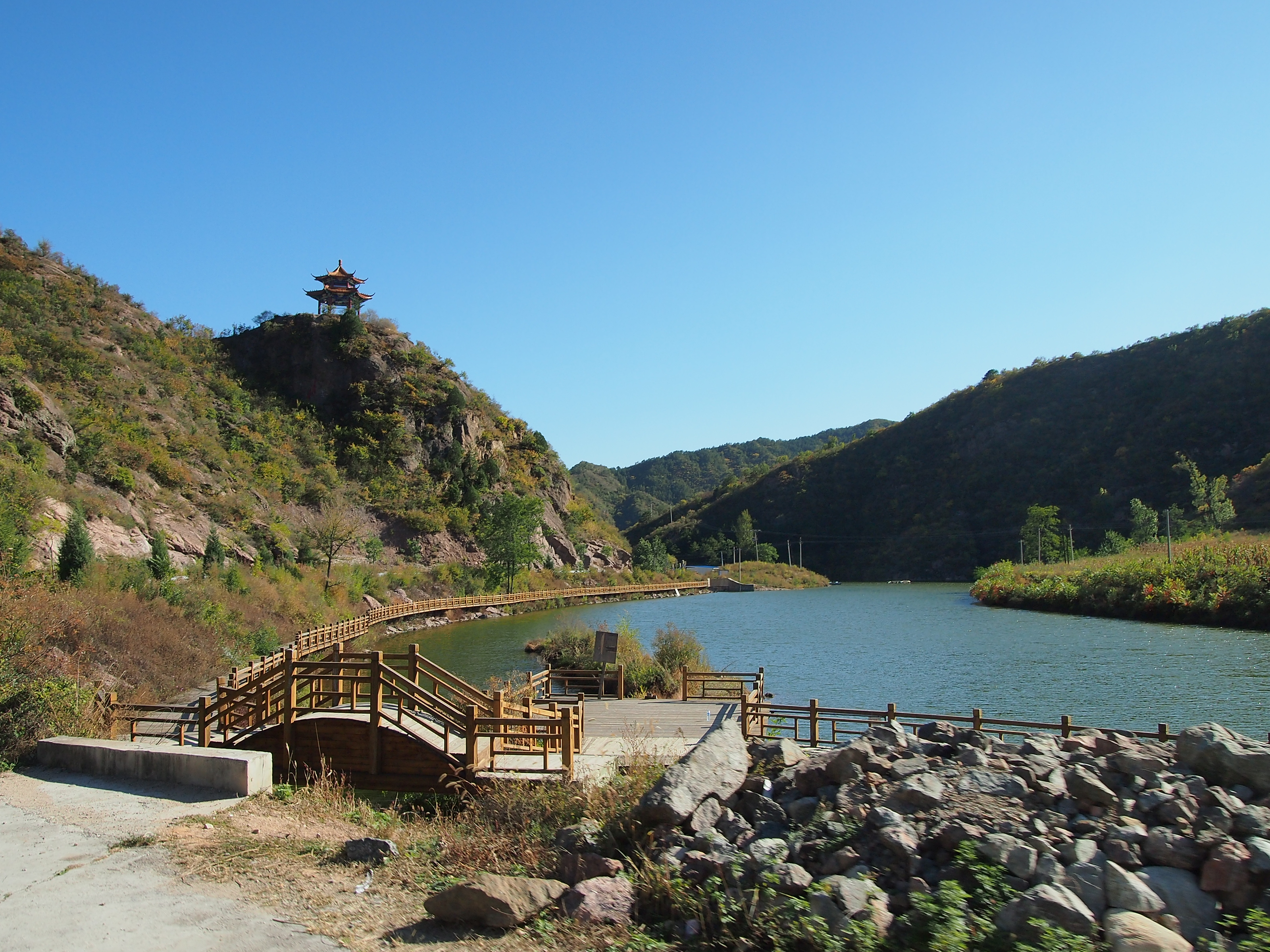
- Sight near Dazhazi Village, northwest of the town, 2012

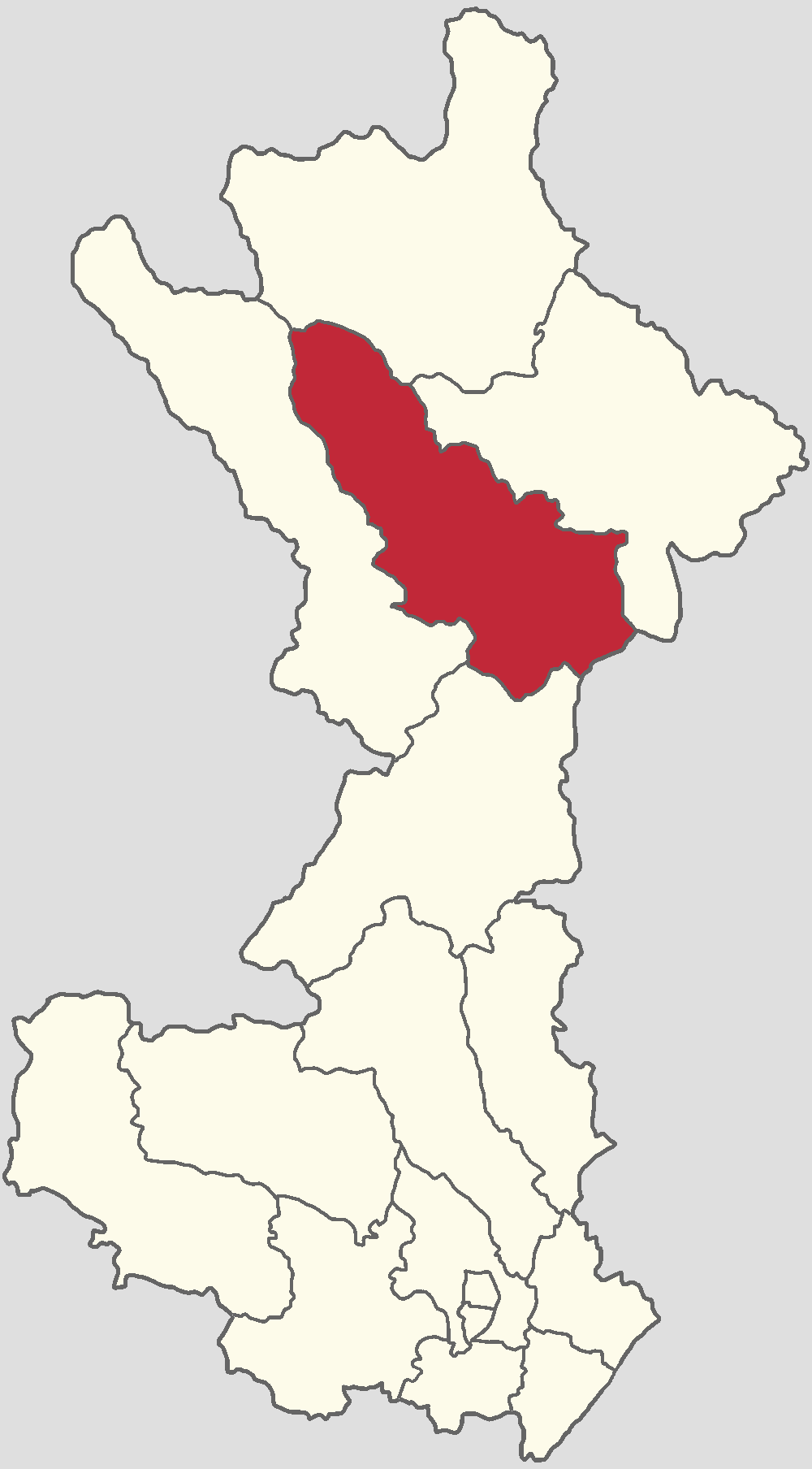
- Location of Tanghekou Town within Huairou District

- Location within Beijing Location within China
- Coordinates: 40°44′09″N 116°38′21″E
- Country: China
- Municipality: Beijing
- District: Huairou
- Village-level Divisions: 1 community 22 villages

Area
  - Total: 224.6 km^{2} (86.7 sq mi)
- Elevation: 290 m (950 ft)

Population (2020)
  - Total: 5,445
  - Density: 24.24/km^{2} (62.79/sq mi)
- Time zone: UTC+8 (China Standard)
- Postal code: 101400
- Area code: 010

Tanghekou Town (simplified Chinese: 汤河口镇; traditional Chinese: 湯河口鎮; pinyin: Tānghékǒu Zhèn), is a town in the northern side of Huairou District, Beijing, China. It shares border with Labagoumen and Changshaoying Manchu Ethnic Townships to the northeast, Shicheng and Liulimiao Towns to the south, and Baoshan Town to the southwest. In 2020 it had a total population of 5,445. Its name Tanghekou literally means "North House".

The town is situated inside a river valley, around the confluence of Bai River and Tang River. For this reason it receives its name Tanghekou (Chinese: 汤河口; lit. 'Mouth of Tang River').

== History ==
Timeline of Tanghekou Town
Time	Status	Under
1949 – 1951	6th District	Sihai County, Chahar
1951 – 1952	12th District	Luanping County, Chahar
1952 – 1956	6th District	Huairou County, Hebei
1956 – 1958	Tanghekou Township	Huairou County, Hebei
1958 – 1959	Gangtie People's Commune	Huairou County, Beijing
1959 – 1960	Tanghekou People's Commune; Changshaoying People's Commune	Huairou County, Beijing
1960 – 1961	Qingshiling People's Commune	Huairou County, Beijing
1961 – 1983	Tanghekou People's Commune	Huairou County, Beijing
1983 – 1990	Tanghekou Township	Huairou County, Beijing
1990 – 2001	Tanghekou Town	Huairou County, Beijing
2001–present	Tanghekou Town	Huairou District, Beijing

== Administrative divisions ==
As of the time in writing, there are 23 subdivisions within Tanghekou Town, where 1 of them is a community and all the rest are villages:

Subdivision names	Name transliterations	Type
汤河口	Tanghekou	Community
小梁前	Xiaoliangqian	Village
二号沟门	Erhao Goumen	Village
黄花甸子	Huanghua Dianzi	Village
许营	Xuying	Village
银河沟	Yinghegou	Village
大栅子	Dazhazi	Village
庄户沟门	Zhuanghu Goumen	Village
东帽湾	Dong Maowan	Village
西帽湾	Xi Maowan	Village
大榆树	Dayushu	Village
新地	Xindi	Village
汤河口	Tanghekou	Village
河东	Hedong	Village
大蒲池沟	Dapu Digou	Village
连石沟	Lianshigou	Village
古石沟门	Gu Shigoumen	Village
东黄梁	Dong Huangliang	Village
卜营	Buying	Village
大黄塘	Da Huangtang	Village
小黄塘	Xiao Huangtang	Village
后安岭	Hou'anling	Village
东湾子	Dongwanzi	Village

== Climate ==
Climate data for Tanghekou Town, elevation 332 m (1,089 ft), (1991–2020 normals)
Month	Jan	Feb	Mar	Apr	May	Jun	Jul	Aug	Sep	Oct	Nov	Dec	Year
Mean daily maximum °C (°F)	0.8 (33.4)	5.1 (41.2)	12.0 (53.6)	20.1 (68.2)	26.4 (79.5)	29.8 (85.6)	30.8 (87.4)	29.9 (85.8)	25.5 (77.9)	18.6 (65.5)	9.1 (48.4)	1.8 (35.2)	17.5 (63.5)
Daily mean °C (°F)	−8.5 (16.7)	−4.3 (24.3)	3.4 (38.1)	11.8 (53.2)	18.0 (64.4)	22.2 (72.0)	24.3 (75.7)	22.9 (73.2)	17.2 (63.0)	9.7 (49.5)	0.5 (32.9)	−7.0 (19.4)	9.2 (48.5)
Mean daily minimum °C (°F)	−15.5 (4.1)	−11.8 (10.8)	−4.5 (23.9)	3.6 (38.5)	9.5 (49.1)	15.3 (59.5)	19.0 (66.2)	17.6 (63.7)	11.0 (51.8)	2.9 (37.2)	−5.7 (21.7)	−13.3 (8.1)	2.3 (36.2)
Average precipitation mm (inches)	1.3 (0.05)	3.7 (0.15)	8.8 (0.35)	19.3 (0.76)	41.1 (1.62)	74.1 (2.92)	133.2 (5.24)	88.6 (3.49)	54.4 (2.14)	25.9 (1.02)	10.8 (0.43)	1.9 (0.07)	463.1 (18.24)
Average precipitation days (≥ 0.1 mm)	1.3	1.9	2.9	4.4	7.9	11.8	13.5	10.9	8.6	5.1	2.8	1.8	72.9
Average snowy days	2.1	2.2	2.0	0.3	0	0	0	0	0	0.1	2.1	2.0	10.8
Average relative humidity (%)	50	45	42	43	51	63	75	77	73	63	57	54	58
Mean monthly sunshine hours	205.3	201.0	238.3	251.2	270.6	236.7	214.6	228.1	224.4	215.1	188.4	195.5	2,669.2
Percentage possible sunshine	69	66	64	63	60	53	47	54	61	63	64	68	61
Source: China Meteorological Administration

== Gallery ==
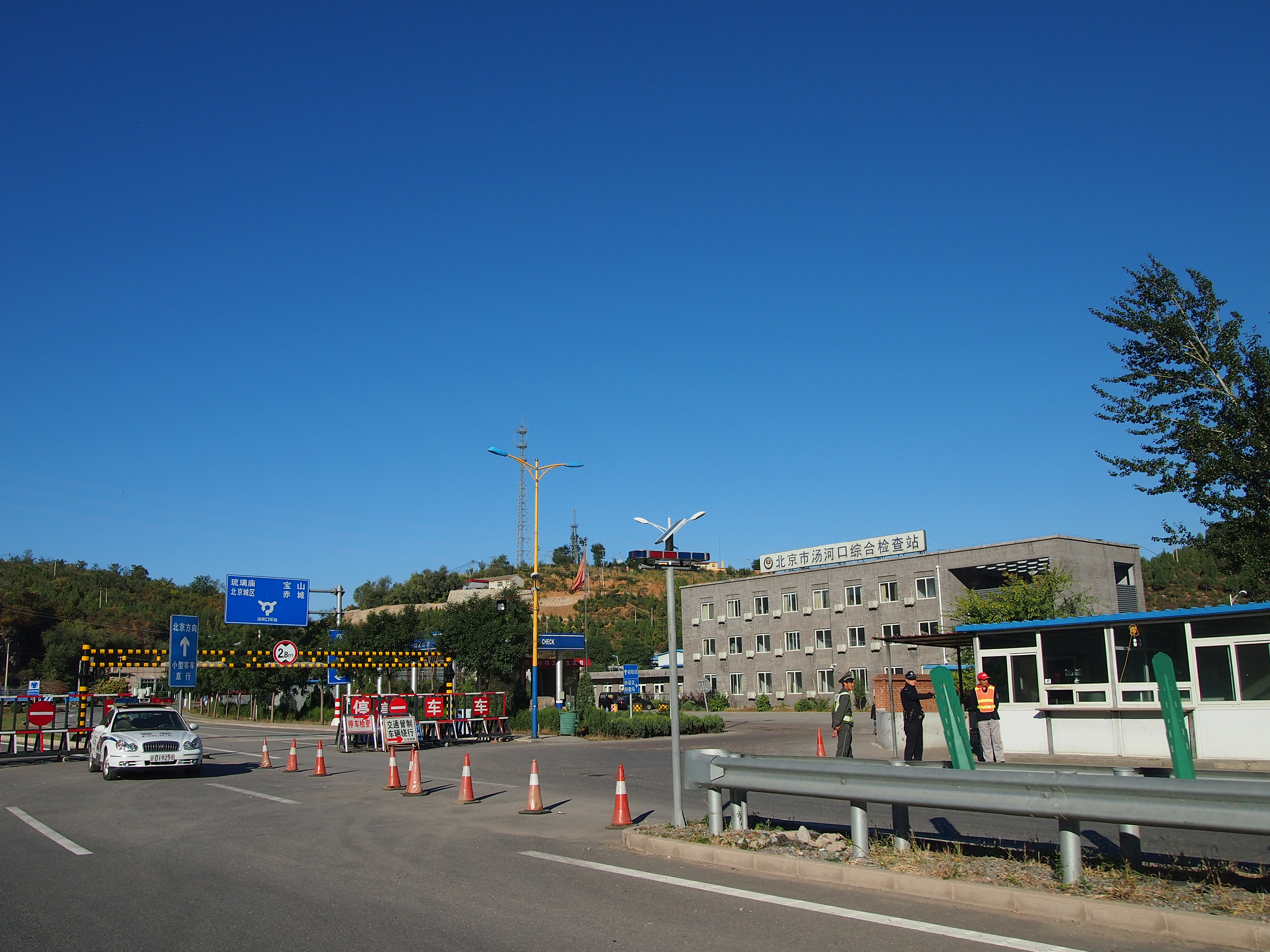
Checkpoint in Tanghekou, 2012

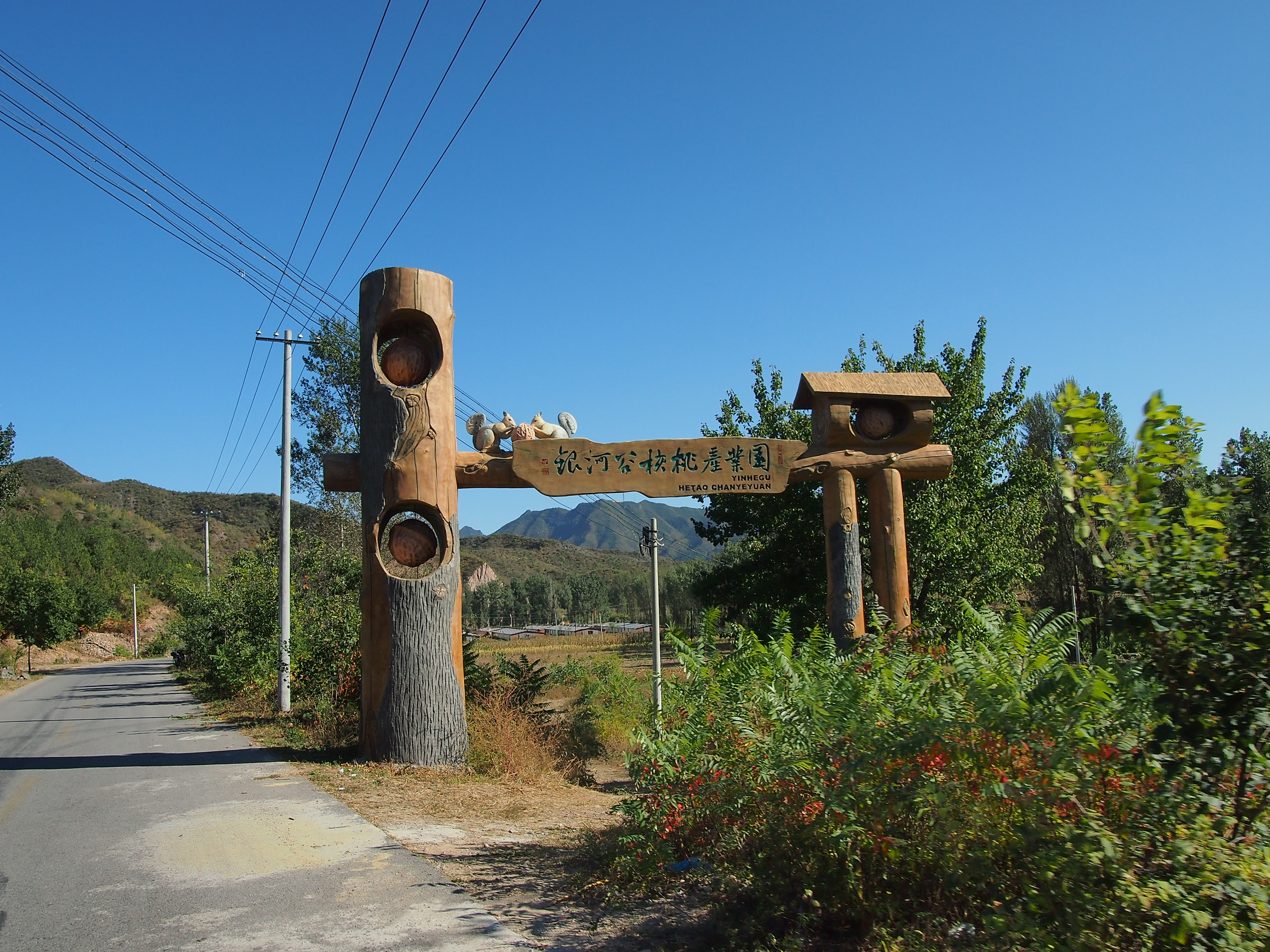
Entrance of Yinghegu Walnut Farm, 2012

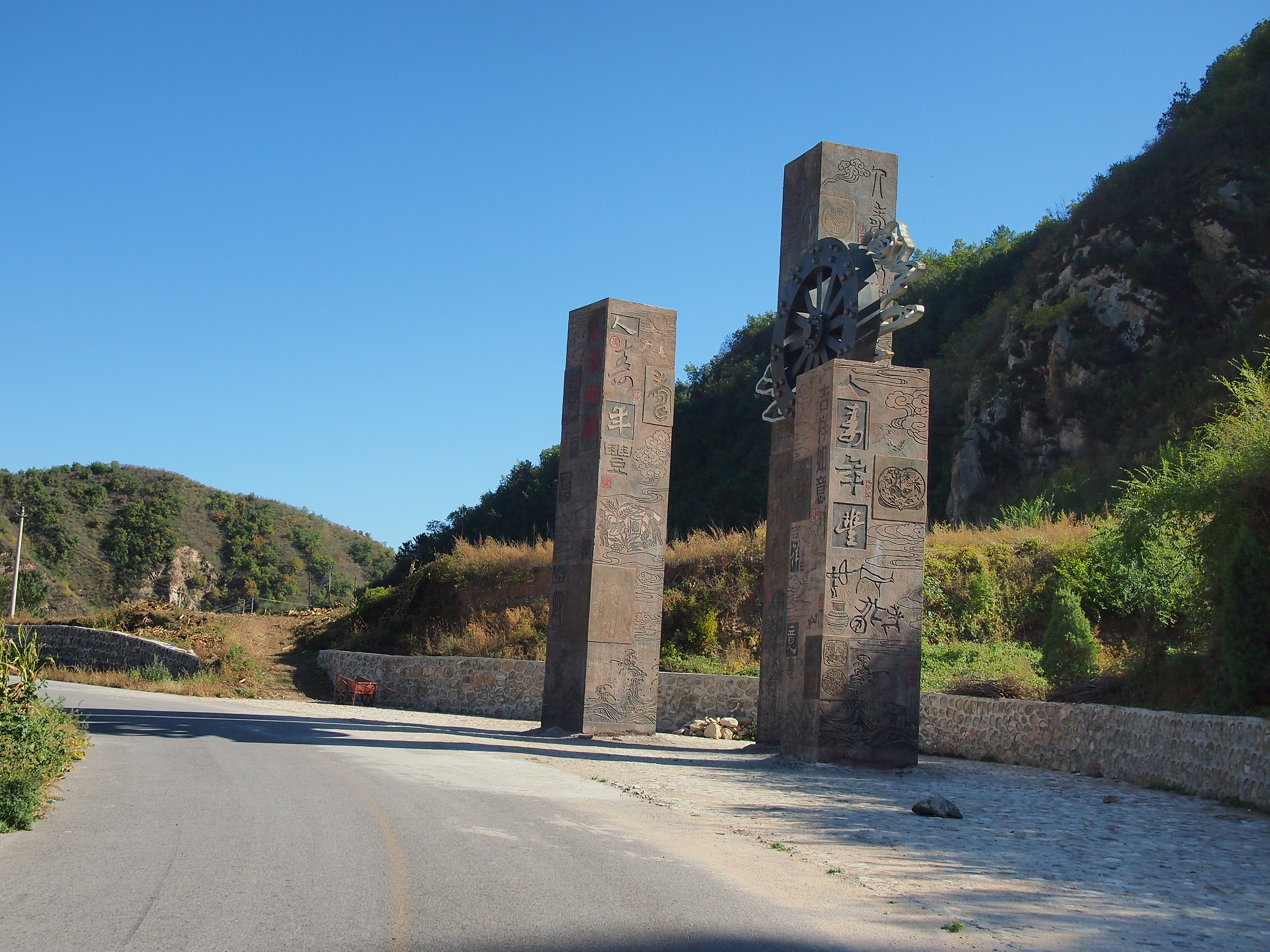
Pillars along Zhuangla Road, with the inscroption of "人寿年丰“ (Long Life and Bountiful Harvest). 2012

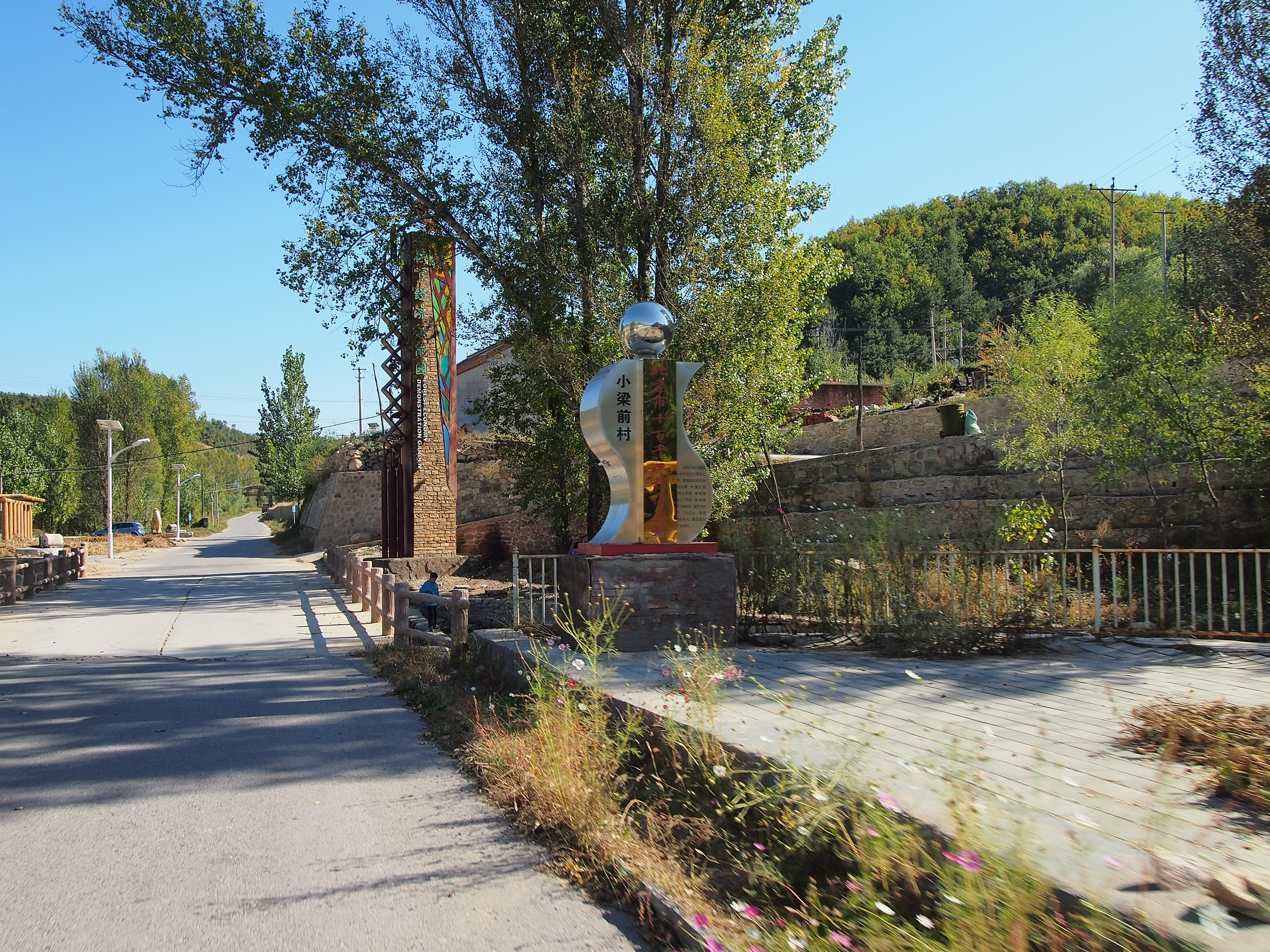
Entrance of Xiaoliangqian Village, 2012

== See also ==
- List of township-level divisions of Beijing
