= Race Across the World series 5 =

Fifth series of Race Across the World

Race Across the World
- Series 5
- Presented by: John Hannah (narrator)
- No. of days: 51
- No. of contestants: 10
- Winners: Caroline and Tom Bridge
- No. of legs: 8
- Distance traveled: 14,000 km (8,700 mi)
- No. of episodes: 9

Release
- Original network: BBC One
- Original release: 23 April – 18 June 2025

Season chronology
- ← Previous; Series 4 Next → Series 6

The fifth series of Race Across the World began airing on 23 April 2025. Each two-person team was required to complete the 14,000 kilometres (8,700 mi) route from China to India without using air travel with a budget equivalent to the cost of the air fare.

The five pairs of contestants are Brian & Melvyn, Gaz & Yin, Elizabeth & Letitia, Caroline & Tom, and Fin & Sioned.

Start and end points
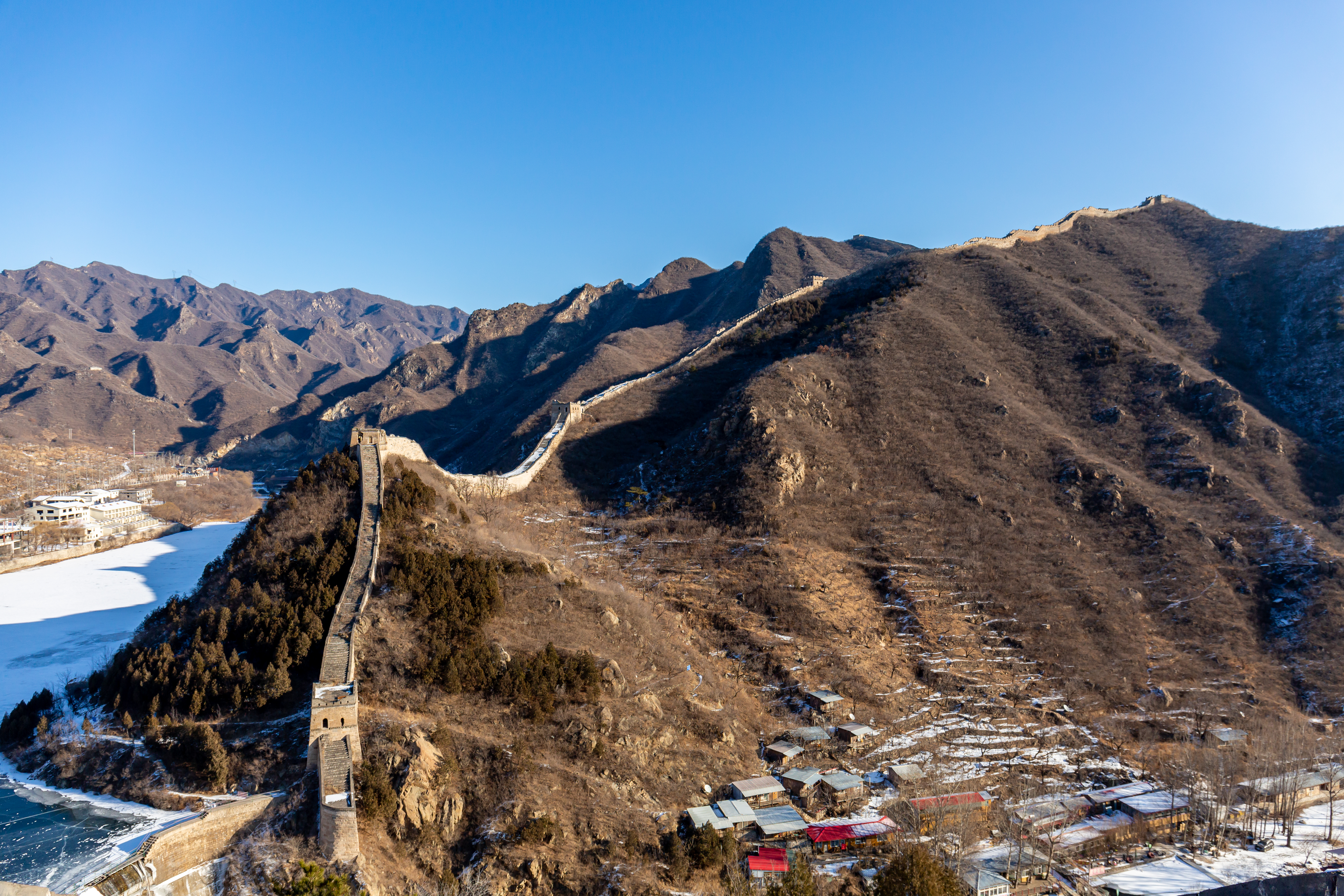
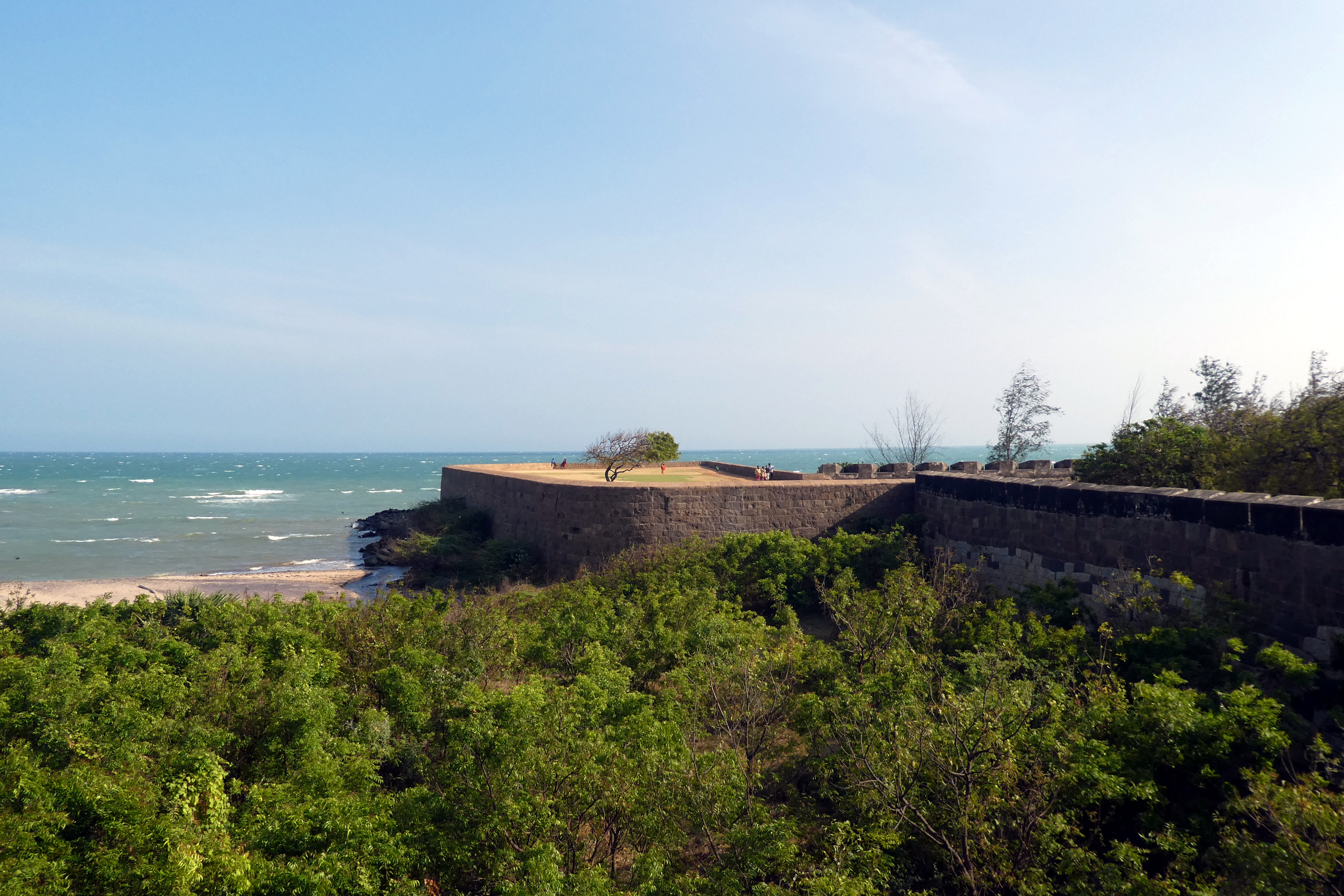
Huanghuacheng, China (top) and Kanyakumari, India (bottom)

== Overview ==
The fifth series of Race Across the World was a 14,000 km race starting from the Great Wall of China, passing through Nepal and finishing at Kanyakumari on the southern tip of India. Due to it not being possible to travel by land across the Himalayas from Shangri-La in China to Kathmandu in Nepal, the contestants were flown instead from China to India to continue the race. This series features the tightest budget yet for a non-celebrity version with the contestants receiving £1,140 per person, the equivalent of £22 a day.

Filming took place over eight weeks from October to December 2024. In this series, some racers found themselves stranded by a typhoon that hit southern China in October 2024. The winning team received £20,000.

== Contestants ==
| Name | Relationship | Occupation | Age | From | Ref. |
|---|---|---|---|---|---|
| Gaz Brown | Former husband and wife | Unknown | 54 | Kent | |
| Yin | Former husband and wife | Unknown | 54 | Kent | |
| Elizabeth | Sisters | Meditation facilitator | 33 | Worthing | |
| Letitia | Sisters | Unknown | 26 | Lancing | |
| Fin Gough | Partners | Unknown | 18 | Nantgaredig | |
| Sioned Cray | Partners | Receptionist | 19 | Nantgaredig | |
| Brian Mole | Brothers | Retired financial advisor | 62 | Burton upon Trent | |
| Melvyn Mole | Brothers | Driving instructor | 65 | Middlesbrough | |
| Caroline Bridge | Mother and son | Housewife | 60 | Hargrave | |
| Tom Bridge | Mother and son | Labourer | 21 | Hargrave | |

== Results summary ==
Colour key:

– Team eliminated
– Series winners

| Teams | Position (by leg) | | | | | | | |
| Teams | 1 | 2 | 3 | 4 | 5 | 6 | 7 | 8 |
|---|---|---|---|---|---|---|---|---|
| Caroline & Tom | 5th | 4th | 3rd | 2nd | 1st | 2nd | 1st | Winners |
| Elizabeth & Letitia | 1st | 1st | 2nd | 4th | 3rd | 3rd | 2nd | 2nd |
| Fin & Sioned | 2nd | 3rd | 4th | 3rd | 4th | 4th | 3rd | 3rd |
| Brian & Melvyn | 4th | 2nd | 1st | 1st | 2nd | 1st | 4th | 4th |
| Gaz & Yin | 3rd | 5th | 5th | | | | | |

== Route ==
The checkpoints in the fifth series were:

| Leg | From | To |
|---|---|---|
| 1 | Huanghuacheng Reservoir Dam, Huanghuacheng, Huairou, Beijing, China | Huangling Shaiqiu Hotel, Huangling, Wuyuan County, Jiangxi, China |
| 2 | Huangling Shaiqiu Hotel, Huangling, Wuyuan County, Jiangxi, China | Phoenix Island Resort, Sanya, Hainan, China |
| 3 | Phoenix Island Resort, Sanya, Hainan, China | Songtsam Linka Shangri-la, Shangri-La, Yunnan, China |
| 4 | Tribhuvan International Airport, Kathmandu, Nepal | Amritara Suryauday Haveli; Varanasi, Uttar Pradesh, India |
| 5 | Amritara Suryauday Haveli; Varanasi, Uttar Pradesh, India | Amirtara Surya McLeodganj Dharamshala; McLeod Ganj, Himachal Pradesh, India |
| 6 | Amirtara Surya McLeodganj Dharamshala; McLeod Ganj, Himachal Pradesh, India | The Fern Gir Forest Resort; Sasan Gir, Gujarat, India |
| 7 | The Fern Gir Forest Resort; Sasan Gir, Gujarat, India | Grand Hyatt Goa; Panaji, Goa, India |
| 8 | Grand Hyatt Goa; Panaji, Goa, India | Vattakottai Fort; Kanyakumari, Tamil Nadu, India |

Checkpoints on Series 5: Checkpoint, Start, Finish
Checkpoints on Series 5: Checkpoint, Start, Resume, Finish

== Race summary ==
| Mode of transportation | Rail Boat / Ship Bus/coach Taxi Private car Cable car Aeroplane Boat |
| Activity | Working for money and/or bed and board Excursion that cost time and money |

=== Leg 1: Huanghuacheng, China → Huangling, China ===
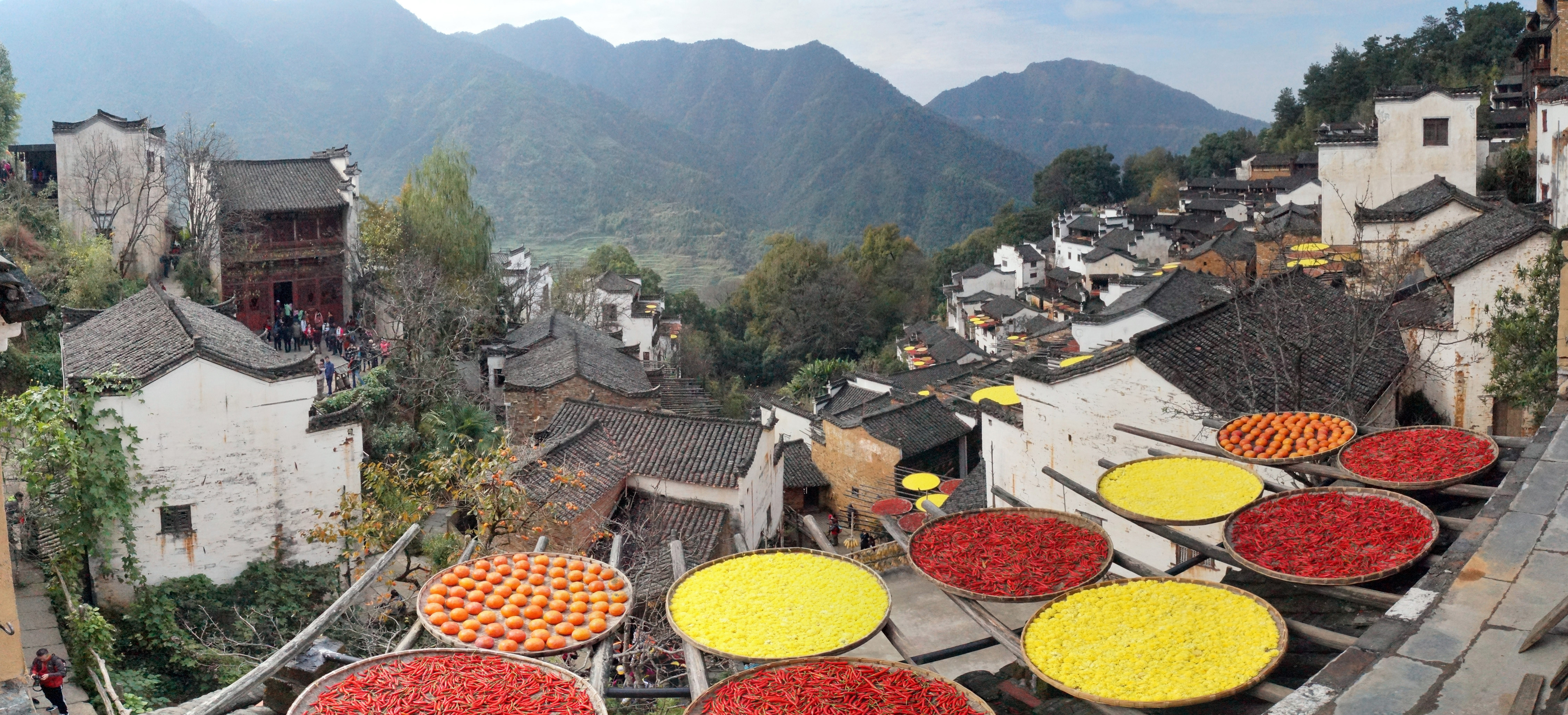
Huangling village

The race started from a point along the Great Wall of China overlooking the village of Huanghuacheng, and the contestants head to the first checkpoint in the village of Huangling in Wuyuan County, Jiangxi. All the racers tried to reach the city of Beijing where they can get trains to other cities, although Gaz & Yin took the wrong bus and went on a detour to Huairou. Caroline & Tom, however, failed to find a connection to their destination and was stranded in Beijing for two nights. Three teams went down the eastern China via Shandong; Fin & Sioned went via Qingdao to Shanghai, Gaz & Yin also went to Shanghai but via Qufu, while Caroline & Tom went through Jinan to Suzhou. Brian & Melvyn and Elizabeth & Letitia chose the inland routes; Brian & Melvyn went to the ancient capital Luoyang where they visited the Longmen Grottoes, while Elizabeth & Letitia went to Shijiazhuang and Bengbu where they worked on a farm for bed and board.

Elizabeth & Letitia took a train directly to Wuyuan from Bengbu, while Fin & Sioned went via Hangzhou. The teams had to take a cable car to reach the village of Huangling. Brian & Melvyn went on another trip to Nanjie, and did not reach Huangling until the following day. Caroline & Tom found that there was no direct train from Suzhou to Wuyuan and had to travel out of the way via Hefei, which meant they fell behind other teams.

| Order | Teams | Route | Time behind leaders | Money left |
|---|---|---|---|---|
| 1 | Elizabeth & Letitia | Huanghuacheng → Beijing → Shijiazhuang → Bengbu → Wuyuan → → Huangling | —N/a | 88% |
| 2 | Fin & Sioned | Huanghuacheng → Beijing → Qingdao → Shanghai → Hangzhou → → Wuyuan → → Huangling | 2 hours 59 minutes | 88% |
| 3 | Gaz & Yin | Huanghuacheng → Huairou → Beijing → Qufu → Shanghai → Wuyuan → → Huangling | 6 hours 49 minutes | 83% |
| 4 | Brian & Melvyn | Huanghuacheng → Beijing → Louyang → Longmen Grottoes → Nanjie → Wuyuan → → Huangling | 21 hours 16 minutes | 84% |
| 5 | Caroline & Tom | Huanghuacheng → Beijing → Jinan → Suzhou → Hefei → → → Huangling | 25 hours 38 minutes | 87% |

=== Leg 2: Huangling, China → Sanya, China ===
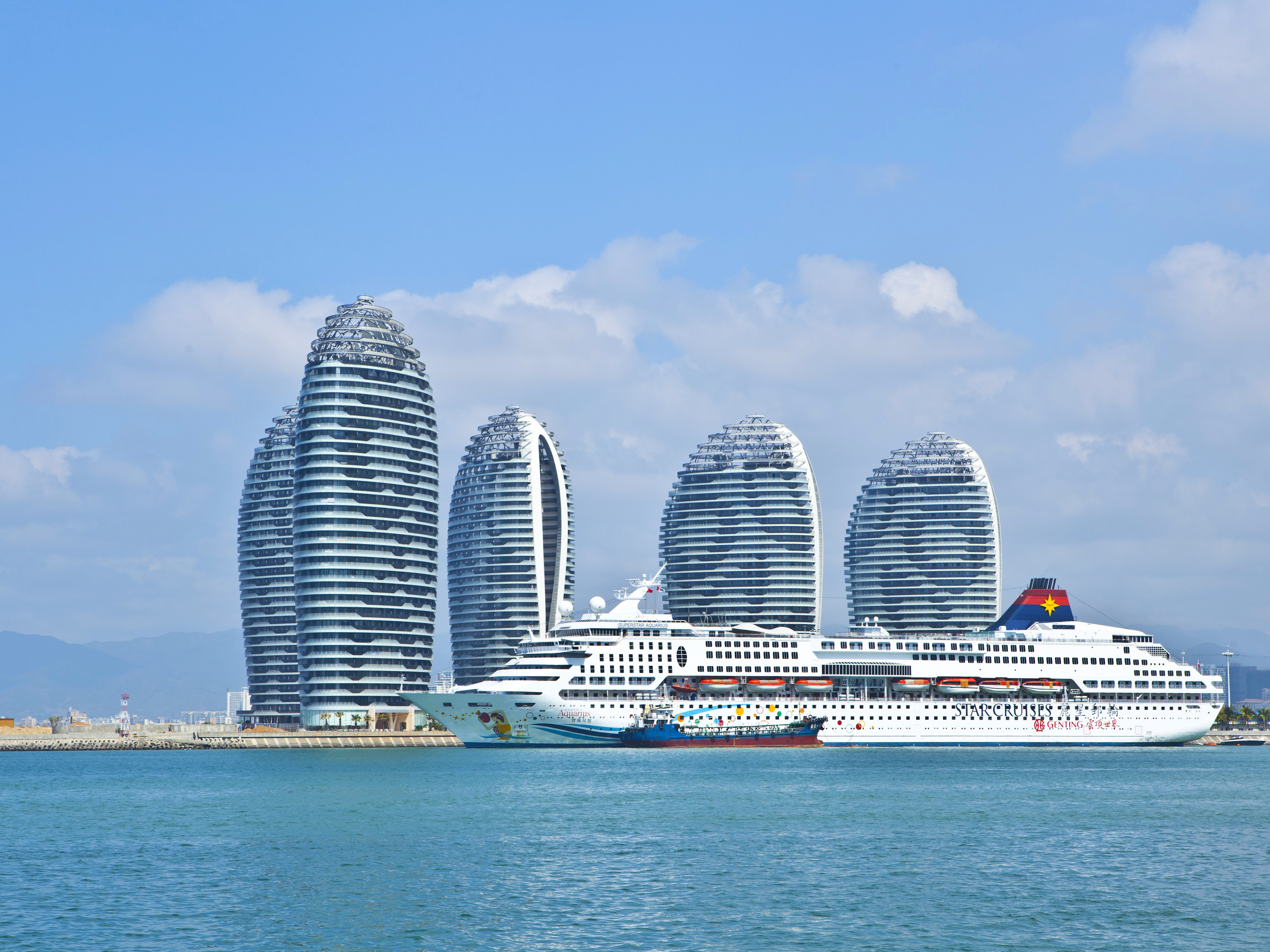
Phoenix Island, Sanya Bay

The race restarted on day 6 and the checkpoint was revealed to be the city of Sanya on Hainan Island. Teams had to backtrack to Wuyuan HSR Station, from there, all teams travelled onward to Shangrao Railway Station. Two teams, Elizabeth & Letitia and Gaz & Yin chose to travel inland into rural China on slow overnight trains in the cheapest seats available. Gaz & Yin headed towards the ancient town of Fenghuang in Hunan Province to work at a noodle bar, with Gaz as an usher for customers and Yin as a dishwasher; while Elizabeth & Letitia arrived in Hengyang on a K-series train transferred to a bullet train to Guilin before boarding a bus to Longji Rice Terraces, Longsheng Various Nationalities Autonomous County, Guangxi to visit rice paddies.

Meanwhile, Fin & Sioned, Brian & Melvyn and Caroline and Tom chose the coastal route via Fujian Province, with Fin & Sioned setting their sights on the coastal metropolis of Xiamen, and Brian & Melvyn choosing to travel to the sightseeing spot of Chuxi Tulou cluster in Xiayang, Yongding County, Longyan for work. Caroline and Tom, trying to catch up, also went to the city of Xiamen before finding their way to Guangzhou. Upon arrival in Guangzhou, they booked train tickets to Zhanjiang departing the afternoon of the day after. The morning of the day after, they worked as a cleaner and learn Kung Fu at a gym in Foshan, the birthplace of Bruce Lee's master Ip Man, before catching their train to Zhanjiang in the afternoon. Fin & Sioned spent some time on the beach of Zhuhai. Brian & Melvyn worked in Chuxi by helping to harvest bamboo shoots and Chinese herbal medicine.

Upon leaving Fenghuang, Gaz and Yin travelled to work on a family farm in Jiangtou ancient village in Jiuwu, Lingchuan County, Guangxi. Yin and Gaz paid for their food and board by working on a paddy field digging up lotus roots. All the other four teams also closed in on the checkpoint, making a final push to the checkpoint Sanya by making their way towards Zhanjiang and Xuwen.

An unforeseen circumstance of this episode was Typhoon Trami that was approaching the island of Hainan. With long-distance coach services being preemptively cancelled before the typhoon arrived, Brian and Melvyn had to pay for high speed rail services which were the only form of transportation they can still use. Elizabeth & Letitia were the first to arrive on Hainan Island by ferry amid torrential downpours due to the typhoon. They chose to take a bus from the ferry port in Haikou to Sanya, while Brian & Melvyn and Fin & Sioned took the train from Haikou to Sanya. From Sanya, the teams were given an instruction on their GPS to make their way to Sanya Qiche Zhan by any available means, either on foot or by taxi, before heading west on foot to find the beach and across the bridge to find the checkpoint hotel located at Phoenix Island Resort. Three pairs managed to make it to the checkpoint hotel by the end of this episode, with Elizabeth & Letitia finishing first and arriving at the hotel first at 19:57 on day 12, followed by Brian & Melvyn, and Fin & Sioned.

Two teams, Caroline & Tom and Gaz & Yin had not managed to reach Sanya, the checkpoint of this leg by the end of the episode. The torrential downpour stranded Caroline & Tom at Xinhai Harbour in Haikou. Gaz & Yin meanwhile were still on the mainland as the ferry service they were on could not depart for safety reasons. Gaz & Yin eventually arrived at the hotel almost two days behind the first team, and over a day behind the fourth team Caroline & Tom.

| Order | Teams | Route | Time behind leaders | Money left |
|---|---|---|---|---|
| 1 | Elizabeth & Letitia | Huangling → Wuyuan → Shangrao → Hengyang, Hunan → Guilin, Guangxi → Longji Rice Terraces, Guangxi →Guilin, Guangxi → Zhanjiang, Guangdong → Xuwen Port, Zhanjiang → Haikou, Hainan →Phoenix Island Resort, Sanya, Hainan | —N/a | |
| 2 | Brian & Melvyn | Huangling →Wuyuan → Shangrao → Chuxi Tulou cluster, Yongding, Longyan, Fujian → Guangzhou → Zhanjiang, Guangdong → Xuwen Port, Zhanjiang → Haikou, Hainan →Phoenix Island Resort, Sanya, Hainan | 3 hours and 54 minutes | |
| 3 | Fin & Sioned | Huangling →Wuyuan → Shangrao → Xiamen, Fujian → Zhuhai, Guangdong → Zhanjiang, Guangdong → Xuwen Port, Zhanjiang → Haikou, Hainan → Phoenix Island Resort, Sanya, Hainan | 5 hours and 29 minutes | |
| 4 | Caroline & Tom | Huangling →Wuyuan → Shangrao →Xiamen, Fujian → Guangzhou, Guangdong → Zhanjiang, Guangdong → Xuwen Port, Zhanjiang → Haikou Port New Seaport → Phoenix Island Resort, Sanya, Hainan | 18 hours and 40 minutes | 73% |
| 5 | Gaz & Yin | Huangling →Wuyuan → Shangrao → Fenghuang, Hunan → Hengyang, Hunan → Jiangtou, Lingchuan County, Guangxi → Zhanjiang, Guangdong → Xuwen Port, Zhanjiang → Haikou, Hainan → Phoenix Island Resort, Sanya, Hainan | 44 hours and 4 minutes | 67% |

=== Leg 3: Sanya, China → Shangri-La, China ===
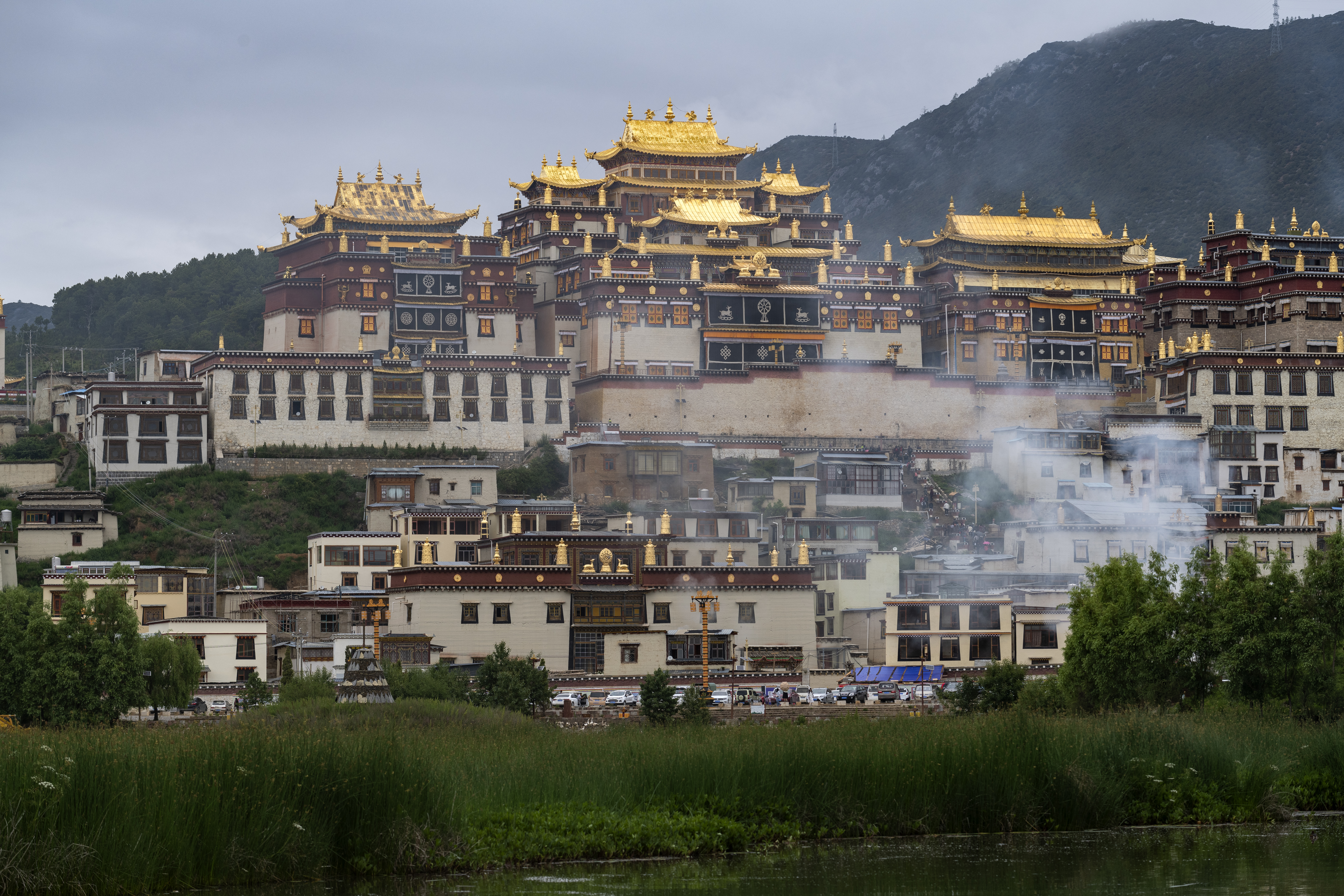
Shangri-La, Yunnan, China

Teams race from Sanya in Hainan island to Shangri-La, Yunnan, China. On day 15, Elizabeth & Letitia were the first duo to leave and they chose to go north through the Guizhou province. Brian & Melvyn were the second to leave and they chose the direct route to the west to Yunnan by taking an overnight bus to Nanning, Guangxi.

Brian & Melvyn went from Nanning to Puzhehei in Qiubei County, Yunnan where they worked for accommodation removing dead lotus leaves in a lake. Caroline & Tom hopped from bus to bus to Nanning. Fin & Sioned caught up with Elizabeth & Letitia in Zhanjiang, Guangdong, and both took the same train o Liuzhou in Guanxi. Fin & Sioned worked as cleaners in a hair salon in Liuzhou, while Elizabeth & Letitia →went on a sightseeing trip. Elizabeth & Letitia, however, had problems finding their hotel, and missed the connecting train to Anshun, Guizhou where they planned a homestay in Xueyuan village. Caroline & Tom went from Nanning to Funing County, Yunnan, but Tom left his moneybag at the hotel, fortunately the cleaner managed to find it among the rubbish cleaned out from the room. They worked in a restaurant while waiting for a train to Kunming, Yunnan. Elizabeth & Letitia also had money trouble as they were running out of local currency, but managed to find someone who exchanged the money on the train for them.

All teams had to travel to Kunming in Yunnan to catch a train to Shangri-La, Yunnan. Fin & Sioned went to Guiyang, Guizhou for some sightseeing, before taking a train to Kunming. In Shangri-La, Yunnan, the teams were directed to Ganden Sumtseling Monastery and from there they went to the checkpoint hotel, Songtsam Linka. Brian & Melvyn were the first team to arrive at the hotel on the 18th day, while the other three teams reached their destination on day 19.

Gaz & Yin, leaving a long way behind the other teams, attempted to catch a train to Nanning but failed, and had to go to Maoming, Guangdong to try to go to Kunming. The other teams however, had reached their destination and they were eliminated.

| Order | Teams | Route | Time behind leaders | Money left |
|---|---|---|---|---|
| 1 | Brian & Melvyn | Sanya, Hainan → → Haikou, Hainan → Xuwen Port, Zhanjiang → Nanning, Guangxi → Puzhehei, Qiubei County, Yunnan → Kunming, Yunnan → Shangri-La, Yunnan | —N/a | 61% |
| 2 | Elizabeth & Letitia | Sanya, Hainan → → Haikou, Hainan → Xuwen Port, Zhanjiang → Zhanjiang, Guangdong → Liuzhou, Guangxi → Anshun, Guizhou → Xueyuan village → Kunming, Yunnan → Shangri-La, Yunnan | 21 hours and 54 minutes | 57% |
| 3 | Caroline & Tom | Sanya, Hainan → Xuwen Port, Zhanjiang → Xuwen Port, Zhanjiang → Zhanjiang, Guangdong → Nanning, Guangxi → Funing County, Yunnan → Kunming, Yunnan → Shangri-La, Yunnan | 23 hours and 9 minutes | 59% |
| 4 | Fin & Sioned | Sanya, Hainan → → Haikou, Hainan → Xuwen Port, Zhanjiang → Zhanjiang, Guangdong → → Liuzhou, Guangxi → Guiyang, Guizhou → Kunming, Yunnan → Shangri-La, Yunnan | 23 hours and 34 minutes→ | 48% |
| 5 | Gaz & Yin | Sanya, Hainan → Haikou, Hainan → Xuwen Port, Zhanjiang → Zhanjiang, Guangdong → Maoming, Guangdong | | |

=== Leg 4: Kathmandu, Nepal → Varanasi, Uttar Pradesh, India ===
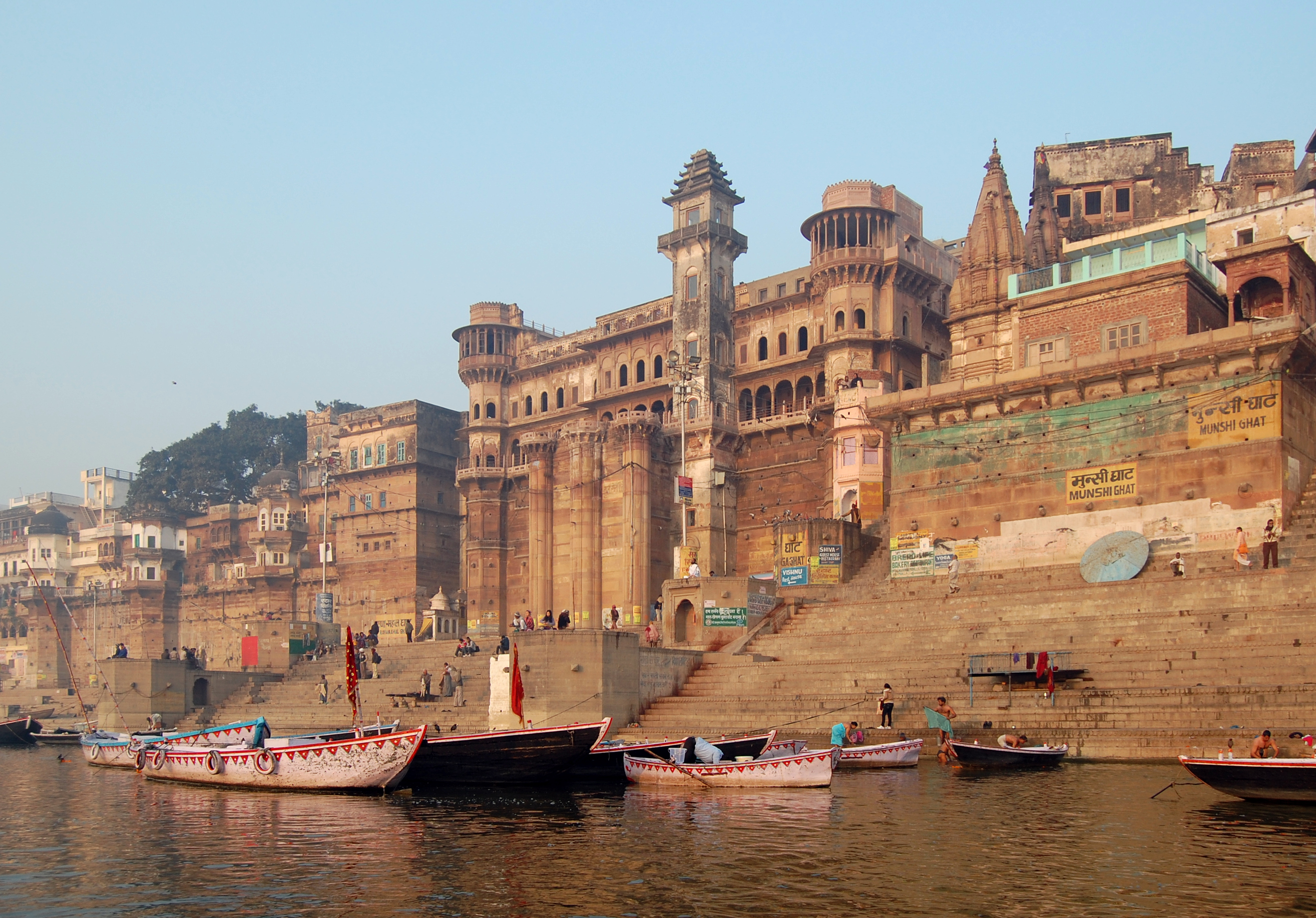
Varanasi, India

As it was not possible to travel overland across the Himalayas, all four teams were moved from China to Kathmandu in Nepal by plane so that they can resume the race. The destination in this leg was Varanasi in India, and this journey at just under 800 km made this the shortest leg yet. Brian & Melvyn were the first to depart almost a day ahead of all other teams on Day 22, and used the same strategy of using bed and board in homestay instead work for pay. They head West to Bandipur where they pay for bed and board by working on a farm.

Elizabeth & Letitia intended to head directly south to Bodh Gaya, India, They stopped at Panauti to work in a restaurant, However, they found that the road to the border town of Birgunj may be unreliable, and had to return to Kathmandu before taking a taxi to the India–Nepal border at Birgunj to try to make up for lost time. Caroline & Tom headed west to Pokhara to see more of Nepal. They stayed at a home in Bhalam before taking an overnight bus to the border at Sonauli/Belahiya. They were the first team to cross the border into India; they travelled to Gorakhpur in Uttar Pradesh, where they worked in a restaurant.

Fin & Sioned, who had the least amount of money, chose to stay in a hostel to save on money so they can go on a safari at Chitwan National Park. From there they travelled to Pokhara where they worked in a hostel to a night's stay there.

On their way to the border, Brian & Melvyn stopped near Tansen, Nepal to try Zip-lining. They crossed into India at Belahiya, they travelled to Varanasi by bus. On the 26th Day, Brian & Melvyn were again the first team to arrive at the check point, the Amritara Suryauday Haveli on Shivala Ghat in Varanasi. Caroline & Tom arrived two hours later after travelling by train from Gorakhpur. Both Fin & Sioned and Elizabeth & Letitia arrived a day later.

| Order | Teams | Route | Time behind leaders | Money left |
|---|---|---|---|---|
| 1 | Brian & Melvyn | → Kathmandu, Nepal → Bandipur → Tansen, Nepal → Belahiya/Sonauli → → → Varanasi, India | —N/a | 48% |
| 2 | Caroline & Tom | → Kathmandu, Nepal → Pokhara → Bhalam → Belahiya/Sonauli → Gorakhpur, Uttar Pradesh, India → → Varanasi, India | 4 hours 15 minutes | 54% |
| 3 | Fin & Sioned | → Kathmandu, Nepal → Chitwan National Park → → Pokhara → Belahiya/Sonauli → Gorakhpur → → Varanasi, India | 27 hours 57 minutes | 38% |
| 4 | Elizabeth & Letitia | → Kathmandu, Nepal → Panauti → Kathmandu → Birgunj → Bodh Gaya, India → → Varanasi, India | 28 hours 47 minutes | |

=== Leg 5: Varanasi, Uttar Pradesh, India → McLeod Ganj, Himachal Pradesh, India ===
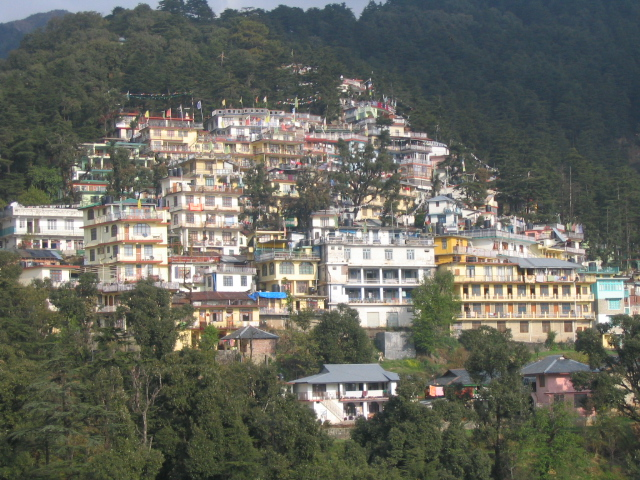
McLeod Ganj in Himachal Pradesh

The teams raced from Varanasi to McLeod Ganj in Himachal Pradesh in this leg. Brian & Melvyn were the first team to leave Varanasi on the 28th day, taking a overnight sleeper bus direct to Delhi, and from there they went to Rishikesh where they practiced yoga at an ashram. Caroline & Tom also chose the route to Delhi, but stopped at Kanpur in Uttar Pradesh to recycle temple flowers to make incense sticks. They used the money they earned to take a taxi to Mathura where they visited the Elephant Conservation and Care Center and volunteered working there.

Elizabeth & Letitia also went via the Delhi route, stopping at Agra to work at a hostel before visiting the Taj Mahal. In Delhi, they were the only team to take a train out of Delhi to Chandigarh. Fin & Sioned avoided Delhi and took a bus to the capital of Uttar Pradesh, Lucknow. They intended to take a bus to Dehradun but missed the bus after the tuk tuk driver took them to the wrong place.

Brian & Melvyn went to Dehradun but missed the bus to Shimla and had to stay overnight there. Caroline & Tom after reaching Delhi, took a bus to Chandigarh before racing to McLeod Ganj in Himachal Pradesh]. On Day 32, they were the first to reach the check point, Amritara Surya, McLeod Ganj, followed by Brian & Melvyn and Elizabeth & Letitia.

After reaching Dehradun, Fin & Sioned went to Mussoorie to stay at a home there. When they reached Dehradun, they found that they were two days behind the other teams. They finally arrived at the checkpoint 33 hours behind.

| Order | Teams | Route | Time behind leaders | Money left |
|---|---|---|---|---|
| 1 | Caroline & Tom | Varanasi → Kanpur, Uttar Pradesh → Mathura, Uttar Pradesh → Elephant Conservation and Care Center → Chandigarh → → McLeod Ganj, Himachal Pradesh India | —N/a | 45% |
| 2 | Brian & Melvyn | Varanasi → Delhi → → Rishikesh → Dehradun → Shimla → → McLeod Ganj, Himachal Pradesh India | 5 hours 10 minutes | 38% |
| 3 | Elizabeth & Letitia | Varanasi → Agra, Uttar Pradesh → Delhi → Chandigarh → → McLeod Ganj, Himachal Pradesh India | 9 hours 33 minutes | 41% |
| 4 | Fin & Sioned | Varanasi → Lucknow, Uttar Pradesh → Dehradun → Mussoorie → → → McLeod Ganj, Himachal Pradesh India | 33 hours 28 minutes | 30% |

=== Leg 6: McLeod Ganj, Himachal Pradesh, India → Sasan Gir, Gujarat, India ===
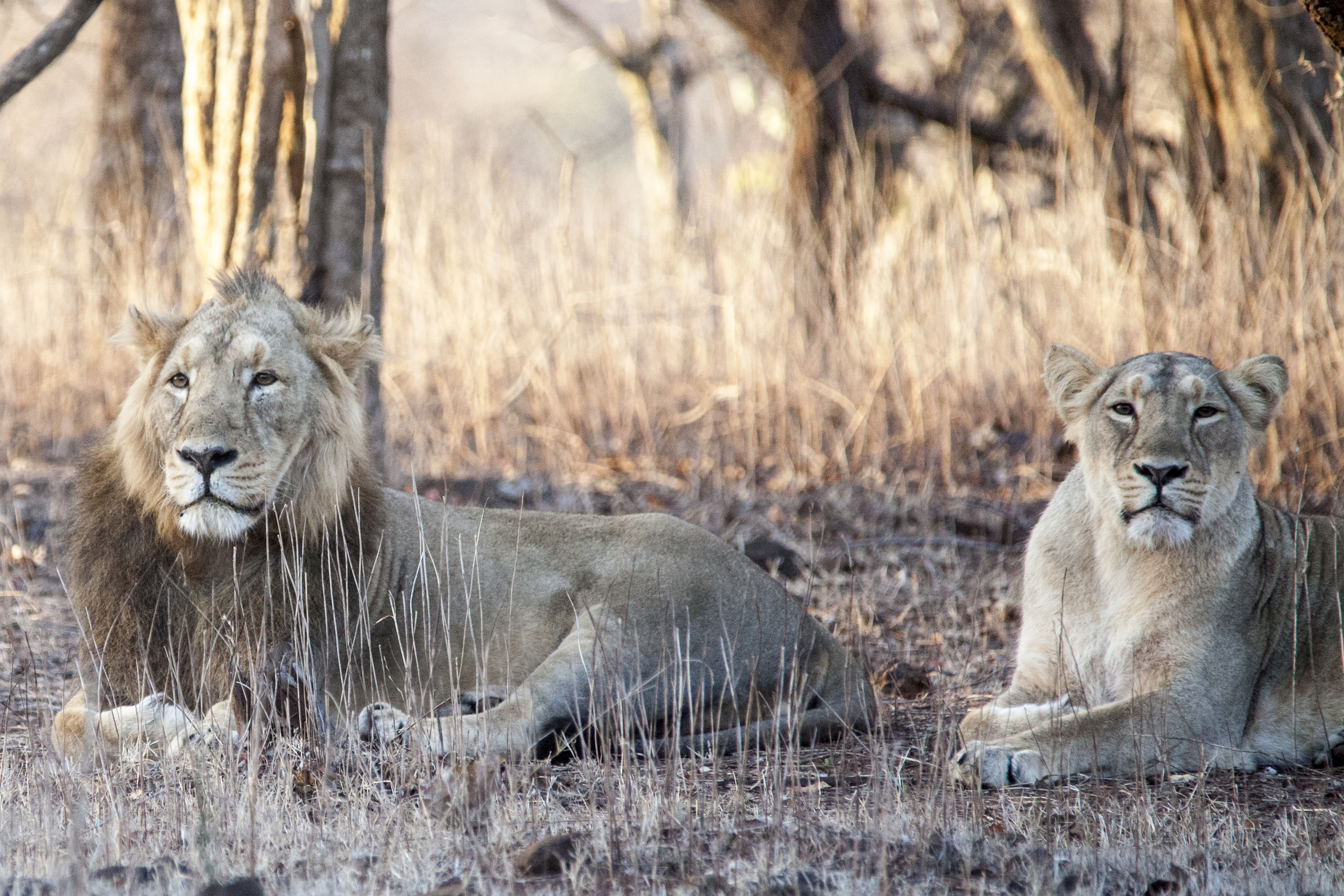
Lions in Sasan Gir

The checkpoint for the 6th leg was the village that serves as the gateway to the Gir National Park, Sasan Gir in Gujarat. The teams had to travel 1,900 km away crossing four Indian states. Caroline & Tom were the first to depart, taking a sleeper bus to Jodhpur, aiming to head to a desert region. Brian & Melvyn also wanted to go the desert, but going to Amritsar first where they visited the Golden Temple before heading to Jodhpur. Elizabeth & Letitia also went to Amritsar, but went to Jodhpur via Pushkar, where they visited Pushkar Lake. Fin & Sioned aimed to catch up by travelling non-stop to Jaipur and Udaipur in Rajasthan.

After reaching Jodhpur, Caroline & Tom went to work and stay in Salawas, a village on the outskirt of Jodhpur. They were the first team to reach Gujarat when they reached Amdavad. They went to the village of Zainabad to see the Little Rann of Kutch salt marshes next to Thar Desert . Brian & Melvyn also reached Gujarat and went to see the Thar Desert in the village of Rajpura. Fin & Sioned worked outside Udaipur to pay for the accommodation.

After staying for some time in the Little Rann of Kutch Caroline & Tom took a taxi to Junagadh and another to Sasan Gir to try to catch up. Brian & Melvyn however were the first to arrive at the checkpoint, The Fern Gir Forest Resort in Sasan Gir on Day 40.

| Order | Teams | Route | Time behind leaders | Money left |
|---|---|---|---|---|
| 1 | Brian & Melvyn | Mcleod Ganj → Amritsar → Jodhpur → Rajpura (Thar Desert) → Rajkot → Sasan Gir, Gujarat | —N/a | 31% |
| 2 | Caroline & Tom | Mcleod Ganj → Jodhpur → Salawas → Ahmedabad → Zainabad, Gujarat (Little Rann of Kutch) → Junagadh → Sasan Gir, Gujarat | 2 hours | 35% |
| 3 | Elizabeth & Letitia | Mcleod Ganj → → Amritsar → Pushkar → Jodhpur → → Sasan Gir, Gujarat | 4 hours 48 minutes | 31% |
| 4 | Fin & Sioned | Mcleod Ganj → Jaipur → Udaipur → Rajkot → Sasan Gir, Gujarat | 6 hours 26 minutes | 21% |

=== Leg 7: Sasan Gir, Gujarat, India → Panaji, Goa, India ===
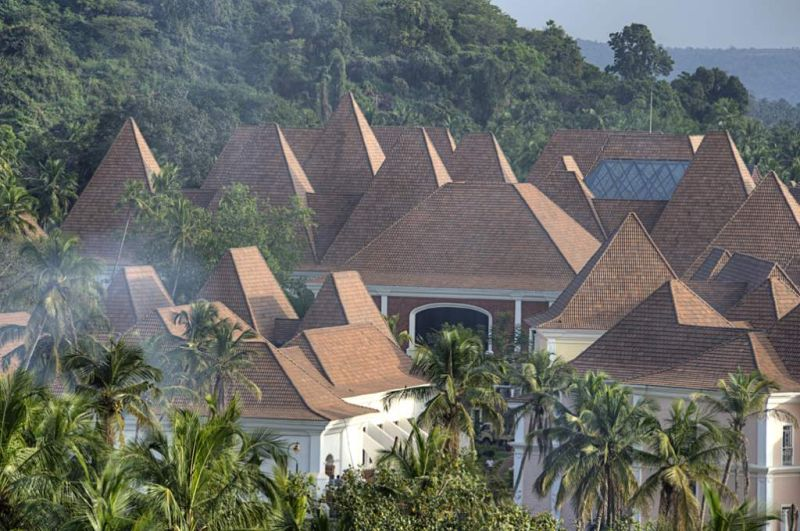
Grand Hyatt Goa in Panaji

For the penultimate leg, all four teams raced from Sasan Gir almost 1,500 km south to the capital of Goa, Panaji. Brian & Melvyn, the first pair to depart, chose to take a taxi to try to catch a twice-daily ferry to cross the Gulf of Khambhat from the ferry port of Ghogha of the Kathiawar peninsula to Surat. Caroline & Tom took the coastal route by bus, from Diu to Bhavnagar. They chose not to take the ferry, instead took an overnight bus to Mumbai in Maharashtra. Two teams chose to go back up north to Rajkot before heading south; Elizabeth & Letitia took a train to Palghar, where they worked to stay in a retreat in the village of Zadapoli, while Fin & Sioned went by bus overnight to Vadodara, where they worked serving chai tea.

Other than Caroline & Tom, all three teams avoided going via Mumbai. Brian & Melvyn however, were the only team to take an inland route to the wine capital of India, Nashik. They went to stay in the Vallonne Vineyards in Igatpuri where they worked for discounted accommodation. Fin & Sioned originally intended to go to Mumbai but changed their plan after hearing that train ticket from Mumbai to Goa needed to be booked well in advance, and took an overnight bus to Pune instead. They found that there would not be bus to Goa until the following evening, so chose to take an earlier bus to Kolhapur. In Mumbai, Caroline & Tom took a train to Churchgate railway station and found that they had go on a waiting list with no guarantee that they would get a ticket the next morning. In the meantime they toured the suburb of Mumbai Bandra.

On Day 46, Caroline & Tom found that they have confirmed seats on the train for Margao, Goa. They reached the checkpoint at the Grand Hyatt Goa in Panaji first. Elizabeth & Letitia went to a place 22 km northeast of Mumbai to catch a train to Goa and finished second. Fin & Sioned took a taxi to Panaji from Kolhapur and finished third. Brian & Melvyn took a bus to Panaji and found that they were last and 17 hours behind the leaders.

| Order | Teams | Route | Time behind leaders | Money left |
|---|---|---|---|---|
| 1 | Caroline & Tom | Sasan Gir, Gujarat → Diu → Bhavnagar → Mumbai, Maharashtra → Margao, Goa → Panaji, Goa | —N/a | 26% |
| 2 | Elizabeth & Letitia | Sasan Gir, Gujarat → Rajkot → Palghar → → Panaji, Goa | 6 hours 54 minutes | 17% |
| 3 | Fin & Sioned | Sasan Gir, Gujarat → → Vadodara → Pune → Kolhapur → Panaji, Goa | 7 hours 48 minutes | 12% |
| 4 | Brian & Melvyn | Sasan Gir, Gujarat → Ghogha → Hazira (Surat) → Nashik → Igatpuri → → Panaji, Goa | 17 hours 11 minutes | 19% |

=== Leg 8: Panaji, Goa, India → Kanyakumari, Tamil Nadu, India ===
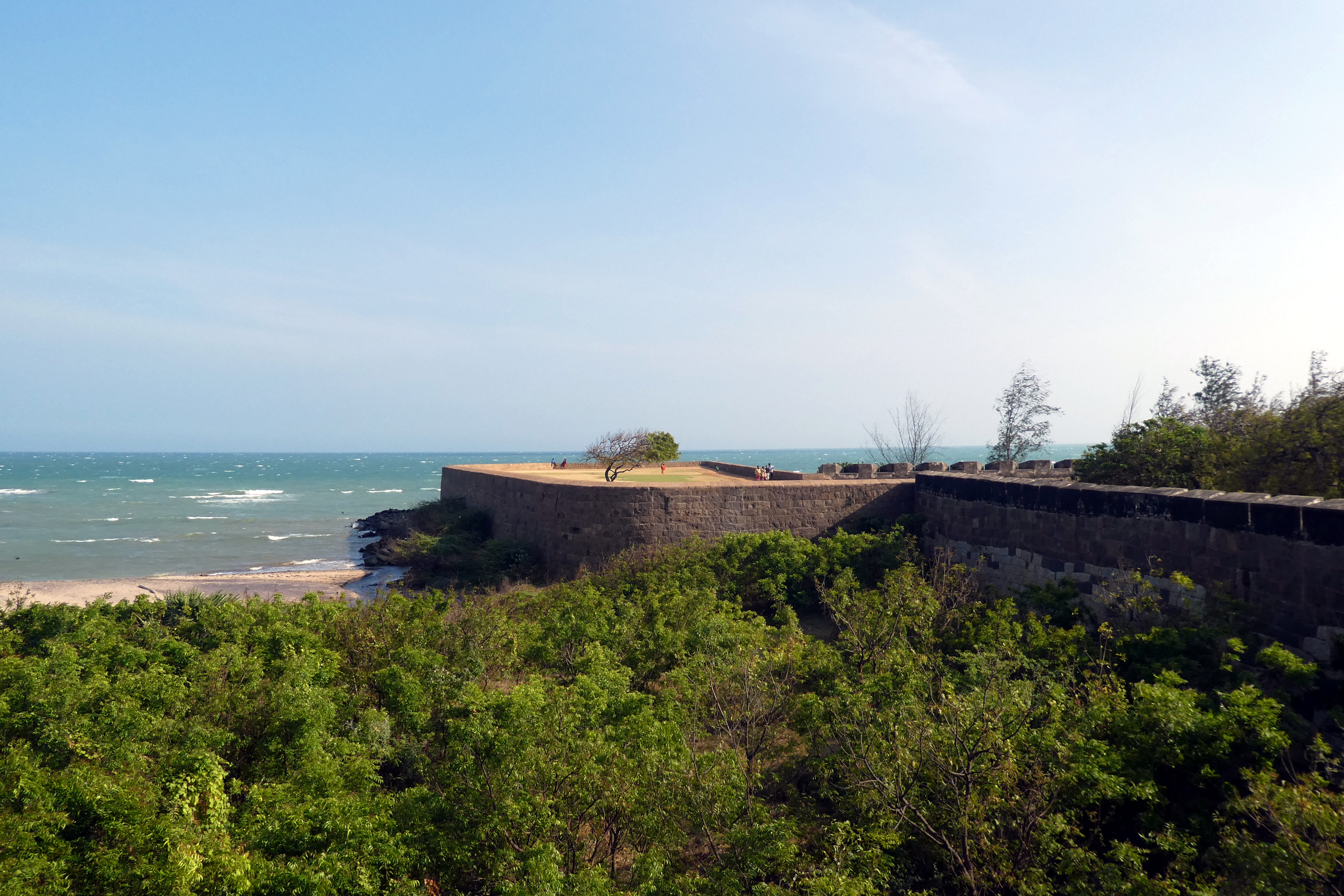
Vattakottai Fort near Kanyakumari

On Day 48, teams left Panaji and raced for the final time to the southernmost tip of India, Kanyakumari in Tamil Nadu. Caroline & Tom were the first team to leave, and they chose the direct coastal route to Kochi in Kerala. However, they found that there was an early train to Udupi, Karnataka, and they chose to go there first. Elizabeth & Letitia chose to go inland, taking a sleeper bus to Mysore, Karnataka. Fin & Sioned also took the inland route by bus, Bengaluru, Karnataka. The last pair to leave, Brian & Melvyn, hoped to make up time by taking a taxi all the way down the Malabar Coast to Mangaluru, Karnataka. Once they reached Mangaluru, they quickly took a train to Kozhikode in Kerala.

In Udupi, Caroline & Tom found that there were no bus or train tickets that day, and had to stay a day there before they can catch an overnight sleeper bus to Kochi. They decided to go on a water safari to the nearby Jumadi Islands. Fin & Sioned, having reached Bengaluru in Karnataka, explored the city while waiting for their next bus to Madurai in Tamil Nadu. Elizabeth & Letitia homestayed in Mysore, and went as guests to an Indian wedding. They took a taxi to Madurai, Tamil Nadu the next day, where Fin & Sioned had already arrived.

Brian & Melvyn spent the night in Kozhikode after reaching there, and took the train to Kochi the following day. Caroline & Tom, however, had reached Kochi before them. After going to see how local fishermen work, they decided to take a taxi all the way to Kanyakumari in Tamil Nadu. Brian & Melvyn also followed with a taxi from Kochi. Both Fin & Sioned and Elizabeth & Letitia also took the taxi to Kanyakumari. Caroline & Tom saw Fin & Sioned when they reached Kanyakumari, and raced to the most southerly tip of India. The teams were instructed to go to Our Lady of Ransom Church before they were directed to go by boat to the Arockiapuram fishing village before racing by foot to the final checkpoint Vattakottai Fort. Caroline & Tom were the first team to arrive, followed by Elizabeth & Letitia 19 minutes later, and Fin & Sioned 45 minutes behind. Brian & Melvyn finished last, just 3 hours 5 minutes behind the leaders.

| Order | Teams | Route | Time behind leaders | Money left |
|---|---|---|---|---|
| 1 | Caroline & Tom | Panaji, Goa → Madgaon →,Udupi, Karnataka → Jumadi Islands → Kochi, Kerala → Kanyakumari, Tamil Nadu → Arockiapuram → Vattakottai Fort | —N/a | |
| 2 | Elizabeth & Letitia | Panaji, Goa → → Mysore, Karnataka → Madurai, Tamil Nadu → Kanyakumari, Tamil Nadu → Arockiapuram → Vattakottai Fort | 19 minutes | |
| 3 | Fin & Sioned | Panaji, Goa → Bengaluru, Karnataka → Madurai, Tamil Nadu → Kanyakumari, Tamil Nadu → Arockiapuram → Vattakottai Fort | 45 minutes | |
| 4 | Brian & Melvyn | Panaji, Goa → Mangaluru, Karnataka → Kozhikode, Kerala → Kochi, Kerala → Kanyakumari, Tamil Nadu → Arockiapuram → Vattakottai Fort | 3 hours 5 minutes | |

== Ratings ==
| Episode no. | Airdate | 7 days | | 28 days | |
| Episode no. | Airdate | Total viewers (millions) | Ranking (all channels) | Total viewers (millions) | Ranking (all channels) |
|---|---|---|---|---|---|
| 1 | 23 April 2025 | 5.86 | 1 | 8.26 | 1 |
| 2 | 30 April 2025 | 5.95 | 1 | 7.59 | 1 |
| 3 | 7 May 2025 | 6.01 | 1 | 7.42 | 1 |
| 4 | 14 May 2025 | 5.85 | 2 | 7.57 | 1 |
| 5 | 21 May 2025 | 5.86 | 1 | 7.25 | 3 |
| 6 | 28 May 2025 | 5.94 | 1 | 7.39 | 1 |
| 7 | 4 June 2025 | 6.05 | 1 | 7.19 | 1 |
| 8 | 11 June 2025 | 6.55 | 1 | 7.27 | 1 |
| 9 | 18 June 2025 | 3.34 | 14 | 3.93 | 5 |
