= Salawas railway station =

Railway station in Rajasthan, India

General information
- Location: Luni, Rajasthan; India
- Coordinates: 26.1393°N 73.0141°E
- Elevation: 193 metres (633 ft)
- System: Indian Railways station
- Owner: Indian Railways
- Operator: North Western Railway
- Line: Jodhpur–Luni section
- Platforms: 2
- Tracks: 4
- Connections: Auto stand

Construction
- Structure type: Standard (on-ground station)
- Parking: No
- Cycle facilities: No

Other information
- Status: Functioning
- Station code: SZ
- Zone(s): North Western Railway
- Division(s): Jodhpur
Location

Salawas railway station is a main railway station in Jodhpur district, Rajasthan. Its code is SZ. It serves Salawas city. The station consists of a single platform. It lacks many facilities including water and sanitation. It is located approximately 8 km from Jodhpur railway station. The railway station is under the administrative control of North Western Railway of Indian Railways.

== Major trains ==
Some of the important trains that run from Salawas are :

- Ahmedabad–Jodhpur Passenger (unreserved)
- Ajmer–Jodhpur Fast Passenger
- Barmer–Jodhpur DMU
- Barmer–Jodhpur Passenger (unreserved)
- Bhildi–Jodhpur Demu
- Jodhpur–Palanpur DMU
