= Delhi–Kathmandu Bus =

Indian-Nepali bus route

Delhi-Kathmandu Bus
- Founded: 25 November 2014
- Stops: Agra, Kanpur, Ayodhya, Gorakhpur, Sonauli, Butawal, & Narayangadh
- Destinations: Delhi, Kathmandu
- Operator: Delhi Transport Corporation

The Delhi-Kathmandu bus is a trans-boundary bus service connecting India and Nepal's capitals at Delhi and Kathmandu respectively. The service is operated by the Delhi Transport Corporation (DTC) and was launched in 2014.

While Delhi Transport Corporation (DTC), a state run corporation, will run the bus service from Indian side, the Federation of Nepalese National Transport Entrepreneurs (FNNTE) is operating the bus service under supervision of the Ministry of Physical Infrastructure and Transport MoPIT. Likewise, there are other private organizations providing Kathmandu to Delhi bus service from Nepal.

This bus service has a 2X2 seating arrangement and is an AC bus service. The service operates from Dr. Ambedkar bus stand near Delhi gate in Delhi. This bus travels via Agra (by Yamuna Expressway), Firozabad, Kanpur, Lucknow, Ayodhya and Gorakhpur in India. This is a direct bus service without any stop. This bus crosses the Sonauli border where customs checks are carried out. The 1,250 kilometres (780 mi) long journey is covered in 30 hours. This is the second international bus service after Delhi-Lahore service by Delhi Transport Corporation (DTC) inaugurated by Atal Bihari Vajpayee in 20 February 1999. There are also plans to start similar bus services to all neighboring countries of India.

== Launching of Delhi To Kathmandu Bus Service ==
The first ever Bus service from India to Nepal was flagged off on Tuesday, 25 November 2014. The bus was flagged off by Road Transport and Highway Minister Nitin Gadkari in New Delhi at a time when Indian Prime minister Narendra Modi was in Kathmandu to attend 18th SAARC summit from 26–27 November. Likewise, Prime Minister Sushil Koirala and his Indian counterpart Narendra Modi jointly flagged off Kathmandu-Delhi-Kathmandu bus service on the same day in Nepal.

== Delhi-Kathmandu Bus Service Significance ==
Delhi-Kathmandu bus is a symbol of desired friendship between two nations. Since its beginning the bus has frequently carried pilgrims, tourists, foreign delegates and general public of both nations. Likewise, it started getting its popularity as an alternative to expensive flights and widely crowded train transportation. This bus service is playing an important role in trade and transportation of both nations. Similarly, this service is providing economic sustainability on transportation service between two nations. The launch of the bus service strengthen relations with Nepal since both countries have strong historical and cultural ties. Since travelling by bus is the best alternatives for flights and widely crowded trains. The reason why the inter-country bus is getting popularity is due to the economic feasibility of travelling by bus. The travel companies in Nepal and India are collaborating on providing the best travel service connecting two nations by buses. The inter boundary bus route networks and the bus services at the best fare are helping to promote tourism and neighborly relationship in both nations.

== Bus Service Details ==
This Bus service will start from Ambedkar Stadium Bus Terminal in the national capital i.e New Delhi India and end in Kathmandu. The route goes via Agra, Kanpur, Ayodhya, Gorakhpur in India. Then the bus will cross Sonauli border where the customs checks are carried out. Similarly, the Bus will follow route via Tilottama, Rupandehi, Kawasoti, Narayangadh and finally to Kathmandu. In Nepal, the bus park is located Near Pashupatinath Temple in Gaushala Kathmandu. Likewise, there are different bus stands around Kathmandu. You can choose the favourable bus stand for you around Kathmandu. Bus stands: Chakrapath, Gongabu New Bus Park, Swayambhunath Hama petrol pump/Kalanki baba petrol pump Likewise, you can get the bus in Narayangath, Butwal, and Sunauli. Services operated by the Delhi Transport Corporation use Volvo B8Rs while FNNTE uses Tata Magnas.
