= Huangling (disambiguation) =

Huangling is the name of several places in China. Many of the names of these places in Chinese may be 黄陵 ("Yellow Tomb" or 皇陵 "Emperor's Tomb"):

- Huangling County, in Shaanxi
- Huangling, Linquan County, a town in Anhui
- Huangling, Dianbai County, a town in Guangdong
- Huangling, Fengqiu County (zh:黄陵镇), a town in Fengqiu County, Henan
- Huangling Mausoleum (zh:明皇陵) of the parents of the Hongwu Emperor, in Fengyang County, Anhui
- Huangling, Wuyuan County, a village in Jiangxi.
