= Huangling, Wuyuan County =

Village in Jiangxi, China

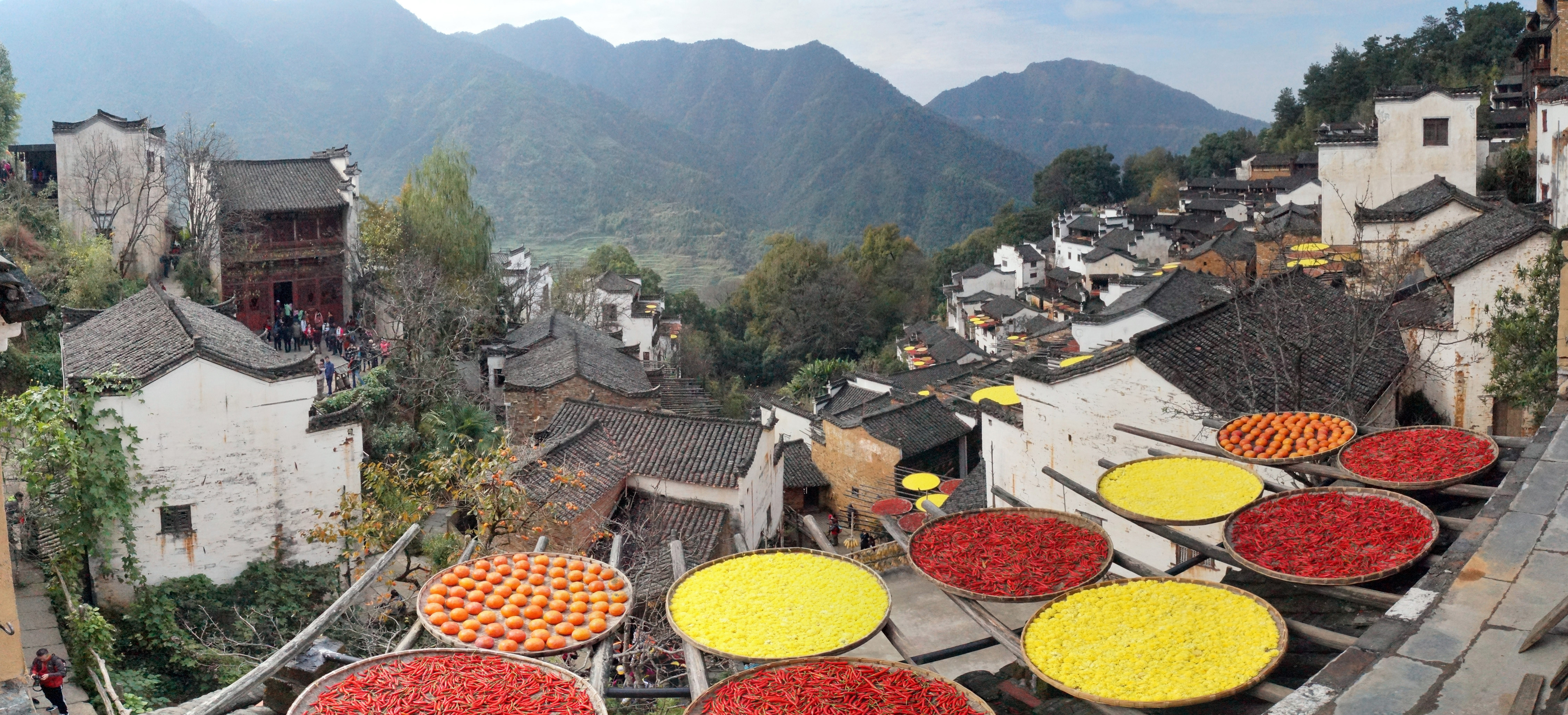
Farm produce being dried in baskets in Huangling village

Huangling (Chinese: 篁岭; pinyin: huánglǐng) is a village in Jiangwan Zhen in Wuyuan County, Jiangxi. The buildings of the village are of Hui-style architecture, and it is noted for its rapeseed flowers that bloom in spring and the local practice of shaiqiu or autumn crop drying where crops are dried in large bamboo baskets on the window sills and roofs. It developed into a tourist village in 2009. It was included in the 2023 list of Best Tourism Villages by the United Nations World Tourism Organization.

== History ==
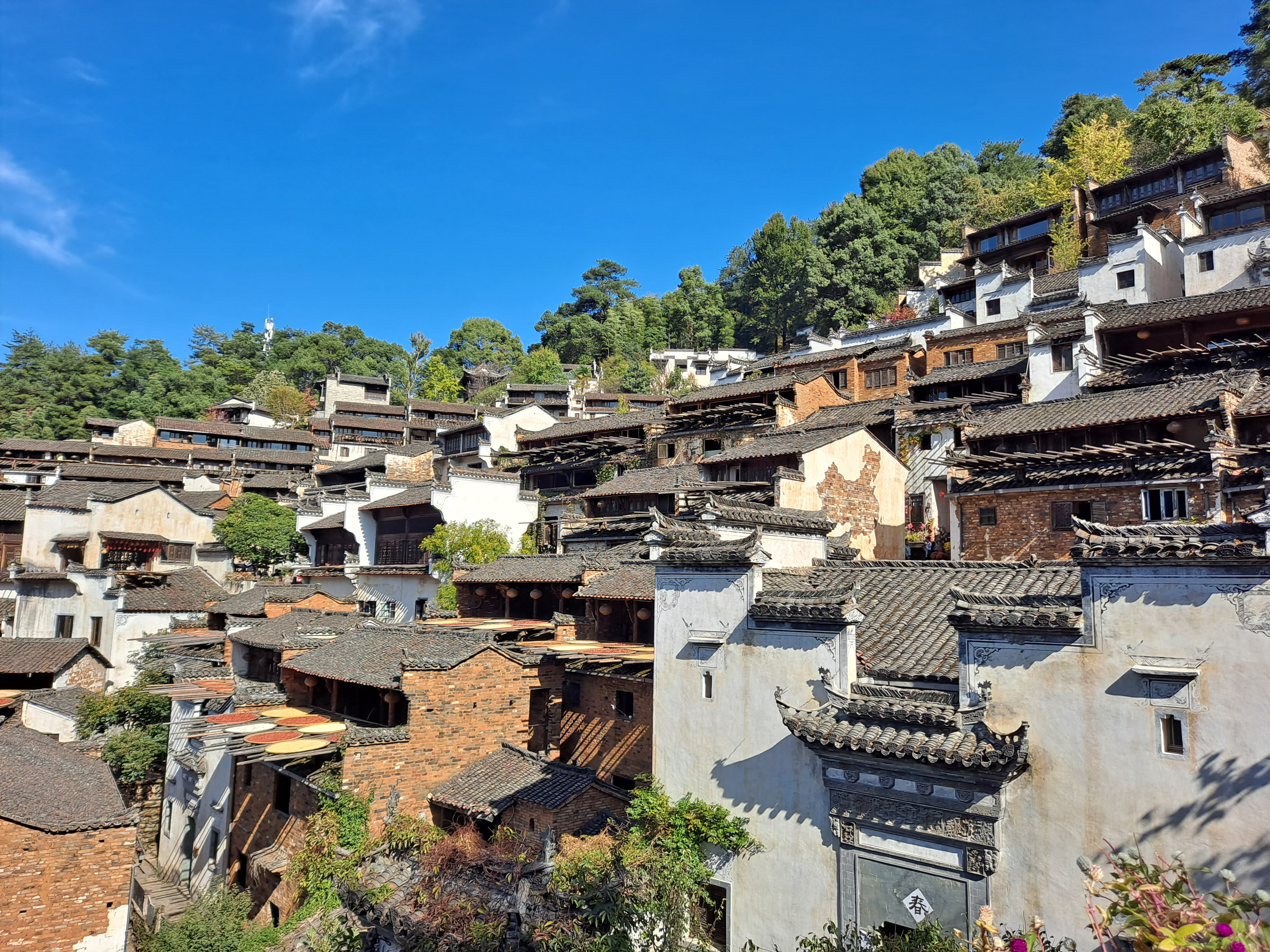
Huangling village

The village of Huangling has existed since the Ming dynasty. Huangling was part of Huizhou, Anhui and its culture was typical of the Hui culture that peaked in the 17th to the 19th centuries. By the late 20th century, the village had become impoverished. The local government encouraged the locals to move down from the mountains starting from 1978, and large-scale relocation of the population took place between 1993 and 2002. The number of households in the village was reduced from over 180 to 68.

In the early 1990s, photographers began to take interest in the picturesque scenes in Huangling, and tourists started to arrive. In 2008, the Wuyuan County Rural Development Co. started a project with Jiangwan town to develop Huangling as a tourist resort. In 2009, the company came to an agreement with the villagers to take control of the old village on the mountain. A new village was created at the foot of the mountain, and residents of the ancient village were moved to the new village. The vacated old buildings in the ancient village were renovated, and other old buildings from other places were relocated to Huangling to help preserve them. Of the 128 old buildings in Huangling, 20 were relocated from elsewhere. In order to cater to the incoming tourists, a high-end hotel and a fine-dining restaurant were built, and shops were created in renovated buildings. while a number of festivals and a variety of activities for tourists were also created. The villagers at the foot of the mountain are involved in the tourism business, providing services and selling locally crafted items and agricultural produce. Two cable cars were installed to link the mountain and the base to carry tourists up the mountain. This model of tourism development to revitalize the village has been described as the "Huangling model". It proved to be highly successful, and the village received more than 1.4 million visitors by 2019.

In 2023, Huangling was one of four villages in China named by the United Nations World Tourism Organization as Best Tourism Villages.

== Local interest ==
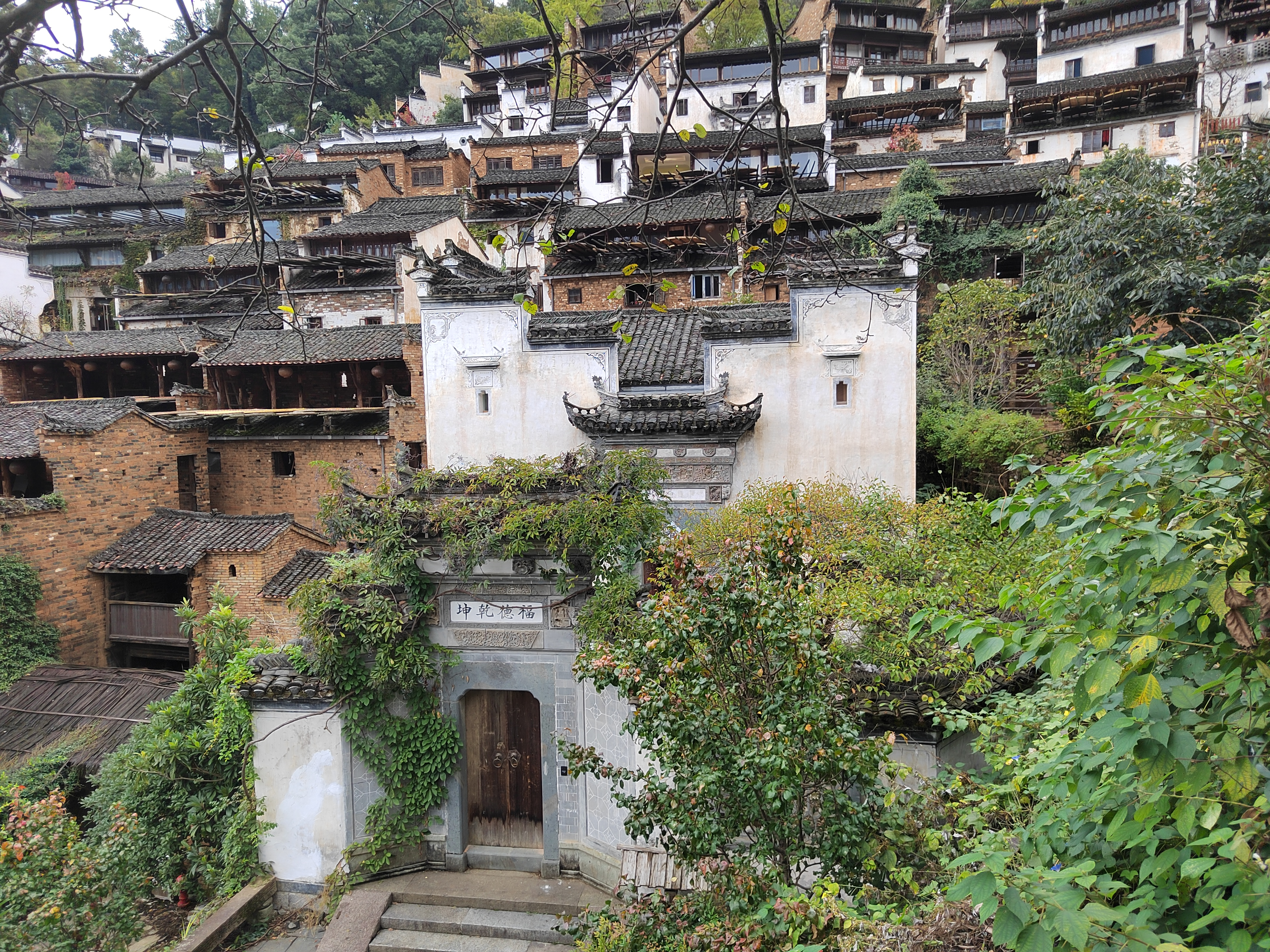
Buildings in Huangling

A feature of the village is its terraces of rapeseed and visitors come in March and April to watch the flowers in bloom. Other flowering plants have been added to the terraces to extend the flowering season all year round. Another feature is the practice of shaiqiu or autumn crop drying where crops including chilies, pumpkins and chrysanthemum flower are dried in large bamboo baskets on the window sills and roofs.

Due to its remote location, many of its old buildings in Hui-style architecture with distinctive white walls and black roof tiles dating from the Ming and Qing dynasties have survived intact.
