= Grand Hyatt Goa =

Hotel in Goa, India

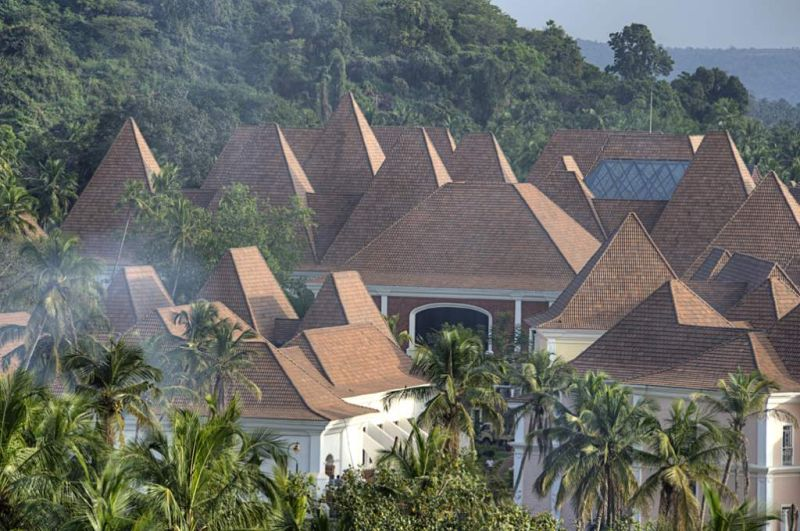
- Grand Hyatt Goa
- Interactive map of the Grand Hyatt Goa area
- Hotel chain: Global Hyatt Corporation

General information
- Location: India, Near Bambolim Beach, Post Goa University, Bambolim, North Goa, Goa, 403206
- Coordinates: 15.451°N 73.852°E
- Opening: 1 August 2011
- Owner: Dynamix Group
- Management: Hyatt Hotels Corporation

Design and construction
- Architect: Chandrasekhar Kanetkar Conceptual Architect Clive Randolph Gray

Other information
- Number of rooms: 313

Website
- http://goa.grand.hyatt.com

Grand Hyatt Goa is a five-star deluxe hotel located by Bambolim Bay in Goa, India. Designed in 1990, the construction of the hotel was started initially in 1995 by the Dynamix Group and thereafter on the formation of DB Group. Work was suspended in between for a few years due to a crisis in the real estate sector all over the country. During end 2005, the work was recommenced to complete the Project. On December 22, 2009, DB Hospitality signed an agreement with Hyatt International for 5 Hyatt hotels in India.

The hotel was built at a cost of Rs. 5,500 million on 28 acres of landed property at Bambolim, North Goa. It is the largest Hyatt hotel in Goa, India.

== History ==
The property was purchased by the Dynamix Group under their holding company Goan Real Estate and Construction Ltd (later changed to Private Limited Company) during 1992 and 1993.

The plan for a grand hotel was conceptualized during mid 1995 and construction was accordingly commenced after receipt of requisite permissions. The hotel architecture was done by Chandrasekhar Kanetkar.

Occupation of the hotel was obtained on 11 July 2010, and all licenses, permissions etc. were put in place thereafter for commencing operations. The hotel was opened on 1 August 2011.

== Facilities ==
The Grand Hyatt Goa is a 5-star luxury resort offering extensive amenities including multiple pools, a full-service spa, diverse dining options, and an on-site adventure park and casino.

Check-in Time: From 3:00 PM

Check-out Time: Until 12:00 PM

Pet Policy: Pets are allowed.

The resort features a free-form outdoor pool, a kids' pool, and a 25-meter indoor lap pool. The full-service Spa offers various treatments, a sauna, steam room, and a fitness center with certified trainers.On-site activities include a sailing center, an adventure park with zip-lining and wall climbing, a casino, and indoor games.The hotel is well-suited for families, with a dedicated kids' club and babysitting services is available .The hotel offers free Wi-Fi, a 24-hour front desk and concierge, laundry service, currency exchange, and business facilities including meeting rooms and a ballroom. It is a wheelchair-accessible property. The resort provides a wide range of culinary experiences across several restaurants and bars .An all-day dining restaurant with five live kitchens, serving a range of cuisines including Indian, Asian, Italian, and Middle Eastern. An authentic Indian specialty restaurant featuring an open kitchen and North Indian cuisine like kebabs and curries.The Verandah offers Italian home-style recipes. A pastry shop with freshly baked goods, sandwiches, and light meals. Capiz Bar & Pool: Bars offering cocktails, wines, spirits, and light snacks with views of the bay or poolside.

== Geography ==
The Grand Hyatt Goa is set on 28 acres of tropical gardens and lawns rolling down to Bambolim Bay. It is approximately 7 km from the capital city of Panaji and about 25 km from Dabolim Airport.The New Manohar International Airport, Mopa (GOX) is further north, about 38 km away.
