= Hui Style architecture =

Traditional Chinese architecture style

Huizhou architecture is one of the traditional Chinese architecture styles, which prevailed mostly in the historical Huizhou prefecture of Anhui, China as a critical element of Huizhou culture. The architecture uses bricks, woods and stone as raw materials, timber frames as significant structures. The bearing structure is a wooden beam, and parapet walls are made of bricks, rocks, and soils. The central room is decorated with painted beams, sculpted roof, and carved eaves with skylights. The technical features and style of Hui-style architecture majorly occur in residential houses, ancestral temples, joss houses, archways, memorial gates, and gardens. The architecture reflects mountainous features of the area and a geomantic omen of traditional Chinese religions.

== Origin of name ==
The word Hui refers to the historical prefecture of Huizhou (or Hui Prefecture) in Anhui Province, which is famous for its merchants. During the period of Ming and Qing Dynasty (about 300 years), the commodity business was mainly dominated by the Huizhou merchants, in Qing Dynasty, Huizhou merchants monopolized the salt-trading industry in China, which made them become peak famous through the country. After they become rich, they go back to Anhui to show off their fortunes and glorify their family name by purchasing lands, squandering consumption, and building luxurious residential houses, gardens, colleges, temples, and memorials. These architectures shared a specific local style with rational layouts and sophisticated decorations. There is also a tradition of carving and drawing decoration among the local folks, which contributed a lot to the unique style of the brick, wood, and stone decorations of the architectures. As a result, Hui-style architecture has become one of the major factions of traditional Chinese architecture.

== Layout ==
=== Crossing-hall layout ===
This layout is also called loop-hall layout. The crossing-hall is located behind the major hall and intimately connected with the considerable hall. It is the transitional space between the major hall and the inner rooms. The pavement is usually wood material. The entrance is at both left and right side of the major hall. The crossing-hall has typically three rooms, one bright lounge with illuminating patio and two rooms for temporary using.

=== Central-hall layout ===
The central hall is illuminated by three openings (front, right, and left) which are separated by moving screens for winter warming and privacy. Most central halls face to the major patio and have two corridors connecting to other rooms. There are screen doors in the front of the central hall, and the middle part of the door is usually closed. In daily manners, users enter the hall from sides. If there is a formal activity, the users can use the middle door. There are guest rooms under the patio area. The central hall is mainly used for official celebrations, guest meetings and daily activities of the owners, the hall is considered as the major part of the architecture.

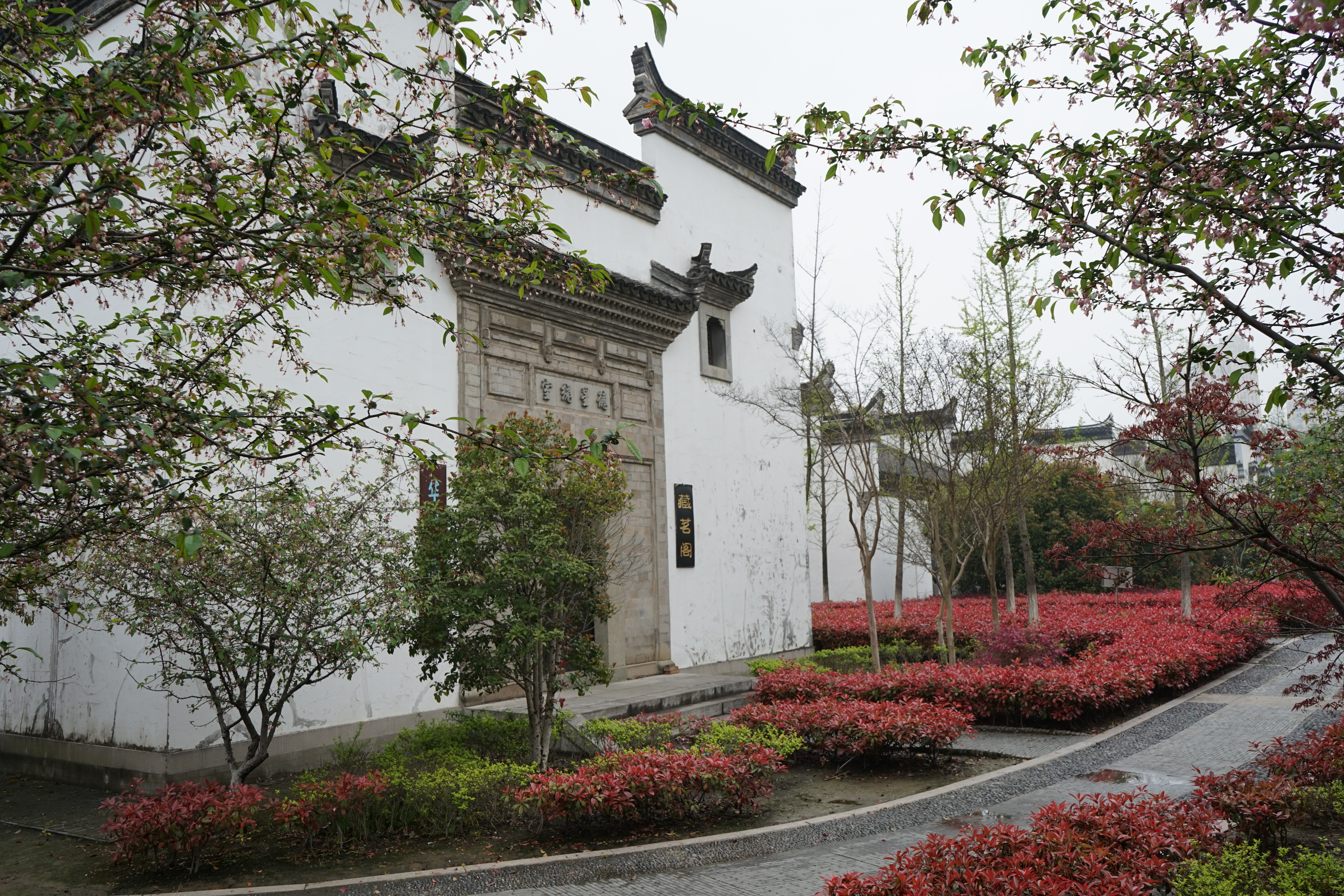
Black tiles and White walls

== Architecture features ==
The structure is much into courtyard type, facing south commonly and surrounded by the river and mountain. The layout is divided symmetrically by the central axis. The central hall locates in the middle, and the rooms are on two sides. The front of the central chamber is called "patio,” which functions for lighting and ventilation. The appearance of residential integrity is solid with closed tall bounding walls, horse head warping, black tiles, and white walls. In adornment respect, mostly use brick, wood, stone carvings craft.

=== Structure ===
Hui-style architecture takes brick, wood, and stone as raw materials, and mainly uses a wooden frame. The beam is always built on a big scale and pays attention to decorate. The middle part of the beam slightly arched, so it is commonly known as "Chinese watermelon beam," with Ming dynasty or Qing dynasty patterns carved on both ends. The middle section of the beam is often carved a variety of patterns, and the whole beam is designed to be magnificent and gorgeous.

The material used for the vertical column is also bulky, and the upper part is slightly thin. The columns of Ming dynasty are usually spindle-shaped, most of them are carved with patterns. Girder does not apply color paint commonly but China wood oil. Patio, balusters, and screen walls are made of bluestones, red sandy stones or granite, which are cut into stone bars, and usually use natural textures of stone materials to combine into carving patterns. The wall uses small black bricks until the horse head wall.

=== Decoration ===
The hui-style architecture also widely used brick, wood, stone carving, showing a high level of decorative art.

The brick carving inlaid mostly on door covers, window lintels, and side walls. Vivid figures, fish, flowers, birds, and patterns are carved on the big black bricks.

Wood carving plays a significant role in ancient residential houses with extensive content. There are many themes, such as traditional operas, folk stories, myths, and legends, as well as life scenes such as fishing, farming, feasting traveling and dancing. These wood carvings are not painted but require a high quality of wood natural colors and textures.

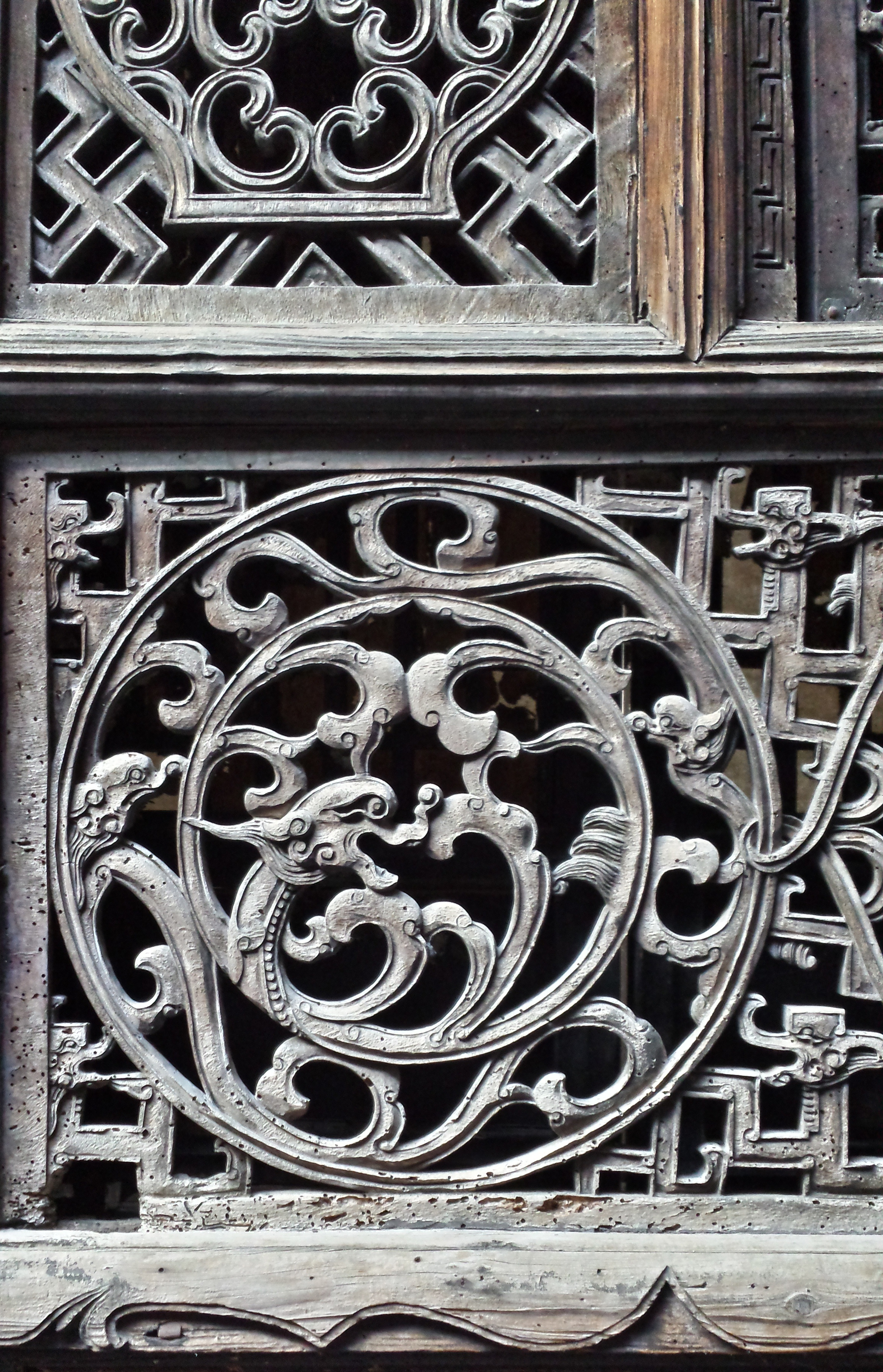
Wood Window Carving

Stone carvings mainly manifest in the ancestor halls, temples, memorial archways, towers, bridges and residential doorways, pools, flower tables, window leakage, pillars, stone lions, and so on. The content is mostly the auspicious dragon and Phoenix, the crane, the tiger, the lion, the elephant, and the auspicious cloud. Techniques are mainly relief, openwork carving, round carving, and so on.

=== Horse-Head Wall ===
Horse-head wall referred to the wall which was between and higher than the two gable roof walls. Since its appearance was like a galloping horse, the wall was called horse-head wall. One of the main features of the Hui-style architectures was the broad range adoption of hose-like wall among the Hui-style architectures. Brick and wood were the main features of Hui-style architecture; while the main failure features of these architectures were the poor fire-proof performance. In ancient times, the firefighting was undeveloped. Once a building fired, it was straightforward that the nearby building burned. To prevent the spreading of fire, the ancient Huizhou residents created the Horse-like wall which could cut off fire effectively; just because of this, the horse-like wall was also known as fire seal wall.

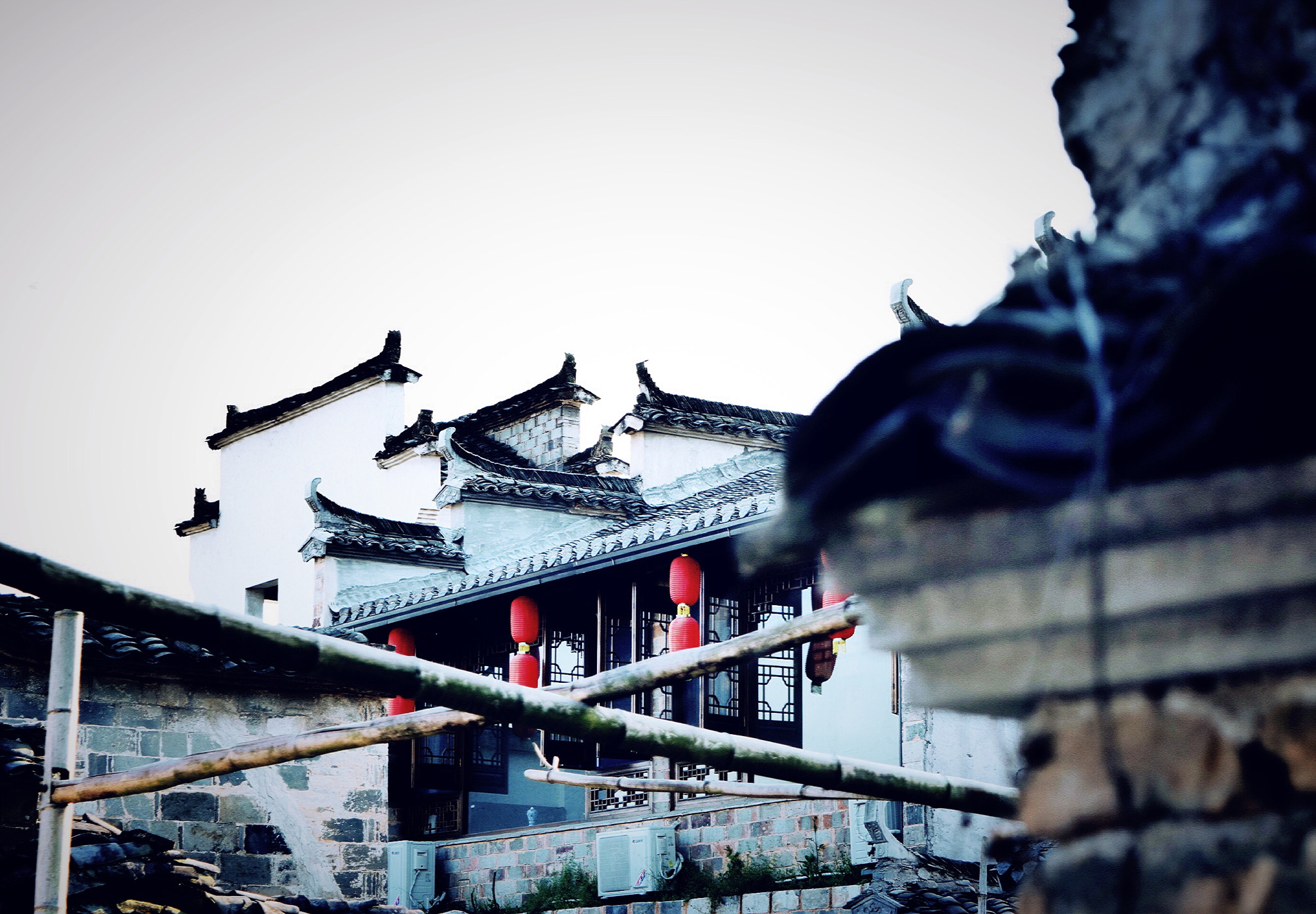
Horse-like Wall

The height of the horse-head wall varied from high to low, and typically, it had the two-lap wall or three-lap wall. The horse-head wall had various types, such as the ‘Magpie Tail Type,’ the ‘Print Bucket Type,’ the ‘Sit Kiss Type’ and others. The ‘Magpie Tail Type’ referred to using the magpie tail shaped bricks as the corner of the horse-head wall. The ‘Print Bucket Type’ referred to using the bucket type bricks as the corner of the horse-head wall. Those bucket type bricks were fired from kiln printed with “卐.” The ‘Sit Kiss Type’ referred to using zoomorphic ornaments as the corner of the horse-head wall. All of these beautiful horse-head walls well symbolized the wisdom of ancient Huizhou people, as well as the characteristic feature of Hui-style architecture.

=== Patio ===
Patio referred to the open space enrolled by the rooms and rooms or walls among the Hui-style architectures which were used to store rainwater and drainage when it rained. Most of the Hui-style architectures were built with patios due to the business tradition. According to the geomantic theory of Huizhou businesspeople, water was the resource of money. It was the businessmen's taboo that the financial resources would flow to the outside, so the water was better that did not rush to the outside. The patio could prevent the pool which was through the roof ridge flow to the outside, and guarantee the water flow to the patio along the trench.

This phenomenon was ensured that all water from the four sides collected to the patio which meant that the financial resources would not flow to the outside. The people of Huizhou had the tradition of a large family which said that when a new couple married, they just lived with the old generation and the young generation. The original house was connected with the old one, and with the separated patio. Gradually, all these houses formed a large building. Among the residential buildings of the wealthy and influential family, there could be many patios. It was said that for those wealthy and influential family, the residential buildings could have thirty-six patios or seventy-two patios. The patio was not completely superstition and without any practical usage. Considering the layout, the patio was the center inside the Hui-style architecture, which made the room with sufficient light, well air circulation, and convenient drainage.

=== White Walls and Black Tiles ===
White Walls and Black Tiles. Regarding color, the Hui-style architecture adopted white wall, grey brick, and black tile, which inspired people with the sense of pure, fresh, and simple. After the ingenious arrangement of the three colors by Huizhou people, the whole of the building composed a beautiful piece of music with a series of jumpy note with musical composition and manifest features.

== See also ==
- Anhui
- Yin Yu Tang
- Ming Dynasty
- Qing Dynasty
