= Sonauli =

Sunauli
- Town
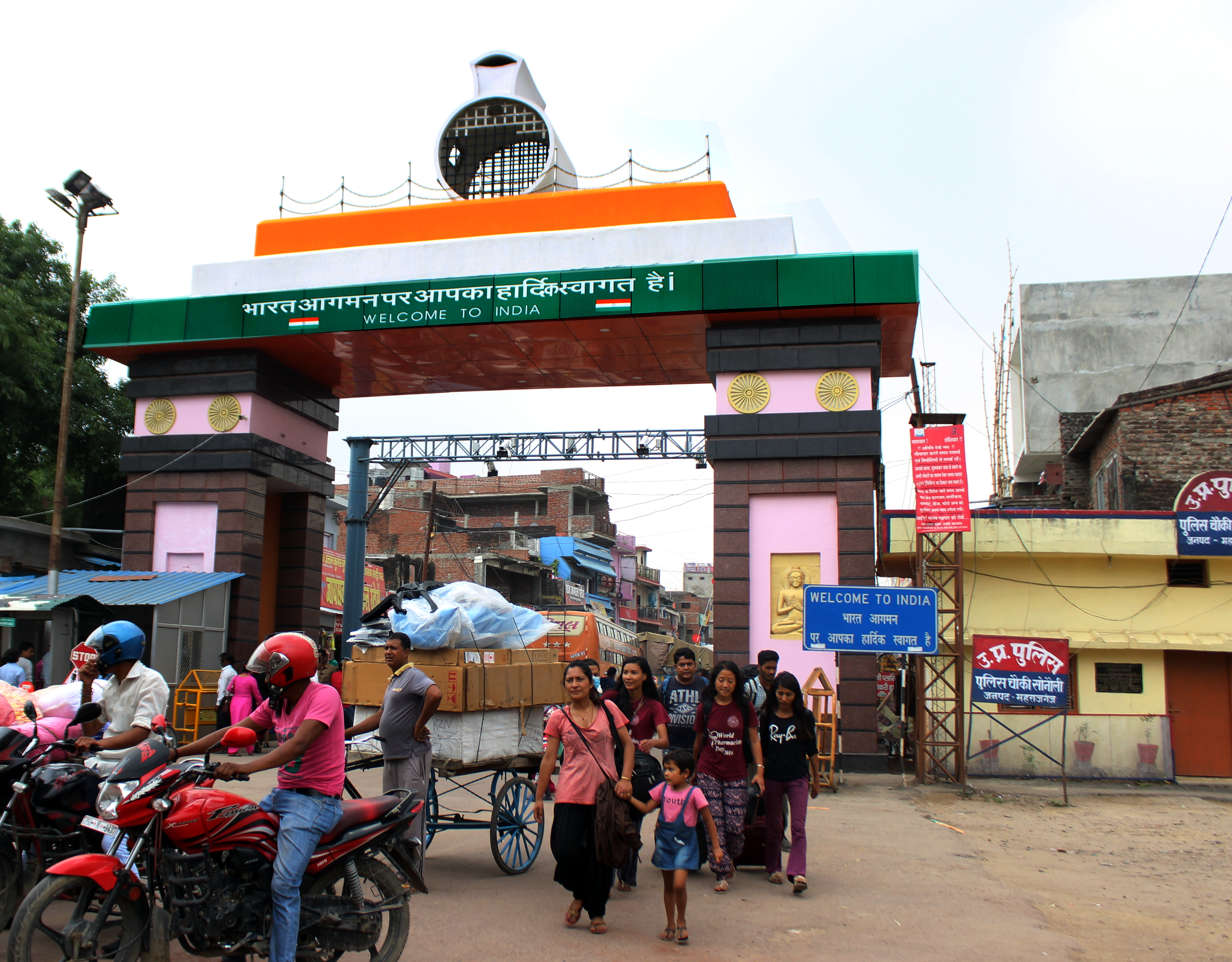
- Nepal-India Border Gate at Sunauli

- Location in Uttar Pradesh, India
- Coordinates: 27°28′25.7016″N 83°28′8.868″E
- Country: India
- State: Uttar Pradesh
- District: Maharajganj
- Time zone: UTC+5:30 (IST)
- PIN: 273164
- Telephone code: +91-05522

Sonauli is a town, near city of Maharajganj in Maharajganj district in Uttar Pradesh, India. It located on the Indo-Nepal Border and is a well-known and most famous transit point between India and Nepal. The Nepali part is called Belahiya.

Sonauli is around 75 km from district headquarter Mahrajganj, Uttar Pradesh and 90 km from Gorakhpur, which is the nearest major city. The nearest Railway station from Sonauli is Nautanwa Railway Station, which is around 7 km away and is now well connected with Indian Railway Network. Earlier Nautanwa was connected with Gorakhpur through Meter Gauge Railway Track. But with the development of Indian Railway Network, this track is converted into Broad gauge which facilitate fast long railway transit.

== Sonauli India–Nepal Border Crossing ==
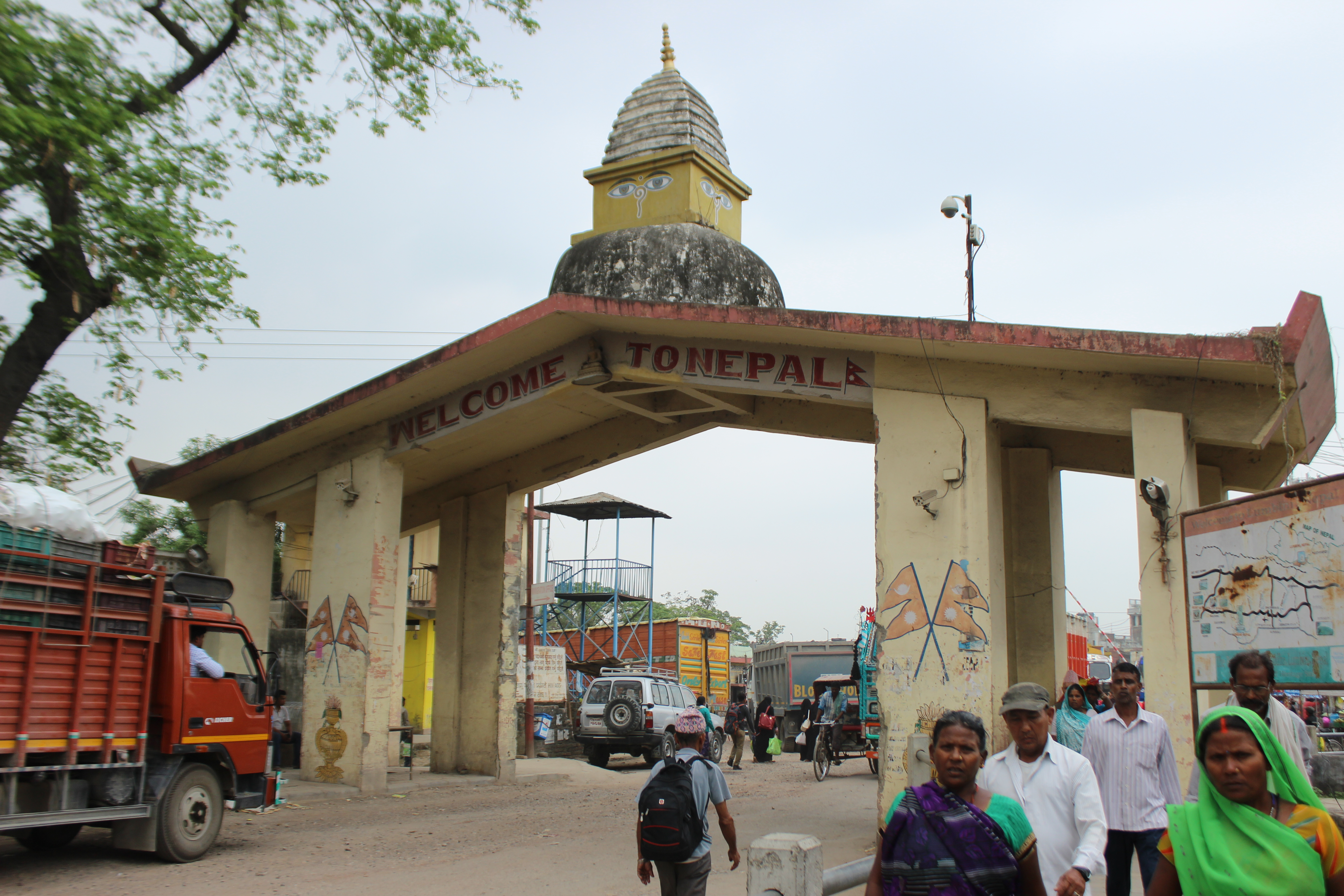
India-Nepal Border gate Sonauli

The Sonauli India–Nepal border crossing or Sonauli Integrated Check Post in Uttar Pradesh is the most popular and designated Integrated Check Posts (ICP), with both customs and immigration facilities:

== Places of interest ==
Though Sonauli itself is not known for any specific tourism destination, it is very close to well known Buddhist tourist spot, - Lumbini i.e. Birthplace of Lord Gautam Buddha which is located in Nepal.

Bhairahawa in Nepal has the nearest airport which is 4 kilometers from the Sonauli border and it is also an international airport now. Gorakhpur Airport is the nearest airport in India which is about 83 Km from the Border and is the largest airport nearby of bearing strength of 377 peoples which serves both as a Civil and for Fighter Jets.

Farendi Tiwari Bazar or Fareniya Bazar is a pop-up market located 2 km west of Sonauli and is a site for bilateral trade between locals of both India and Nepal. It is open on Wednesday and Saturday. There is not only economic exchange but also cultural exchange at Fareniya Bazar. The market is organized by Farendi Tiwari landlords and under supervision of Sashastra Seema Bal. The water catchment from a small check dam near this marketplace is used for irrigation purposes by farmers. Near Sonauli is the biggest market of the area Nautanwa. It is a large market which garners customers from Nepal as well as India.
