= Salawas =

- Location in Jodhpur, Rajasthan, India Salawas (India)
- Coordinates: 26°08′25″N 73°01′05″E
- Country: India
- State: Rajasthan

Languages
  - Official: Hindi
- Time zone: UTC+5:30 (IST)
- Postal code: 342013

Salawas is a small village 22 km from Jodhpur and is famous for durries (rugs) made by the local craftsmen.
