= Henanzhai =

Henanzhai Town 河南寨镇
- Town
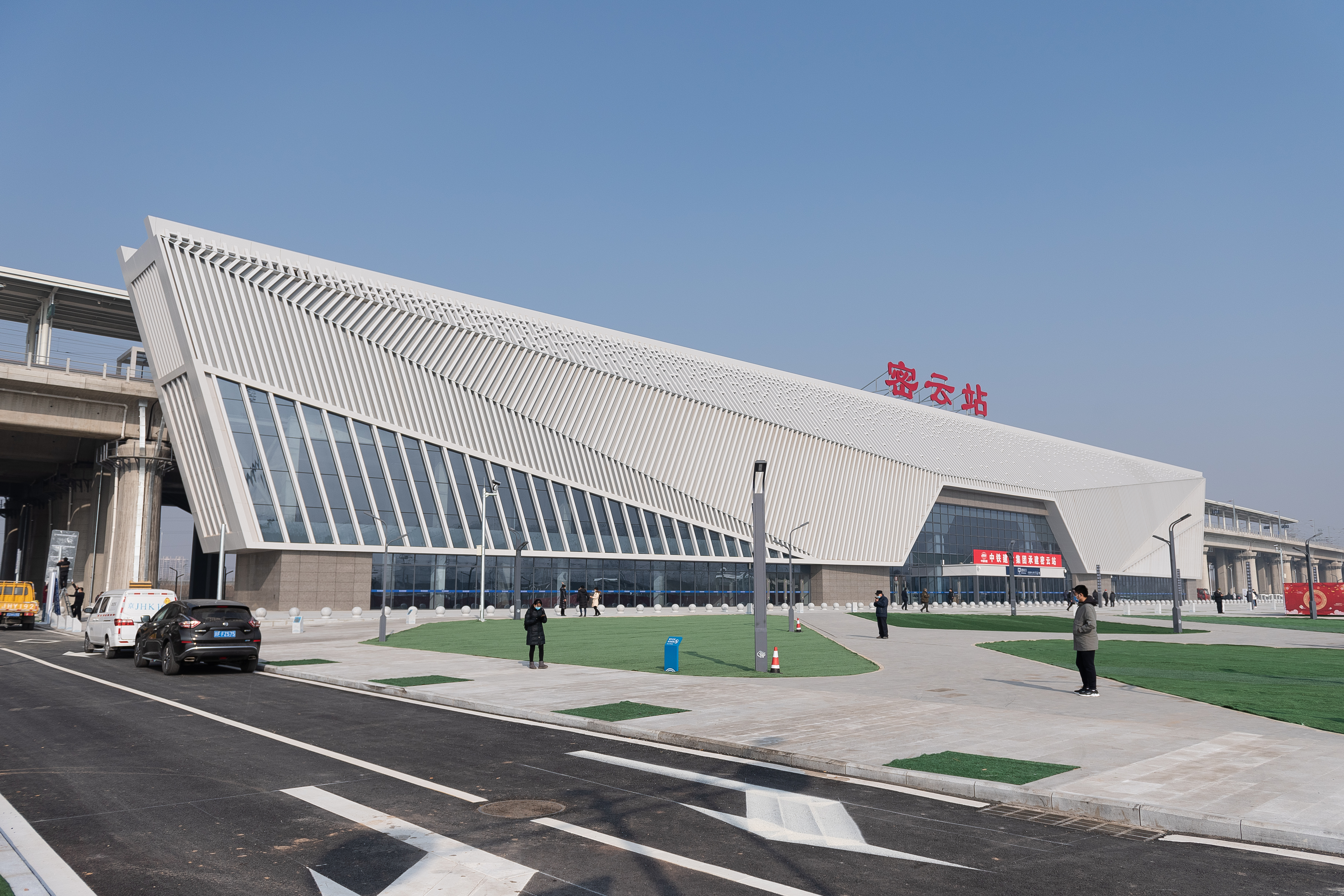
- Miyun railway station on the Beijing–Shenyang high-speed railway in Ningcun, Henanzhai, 2021

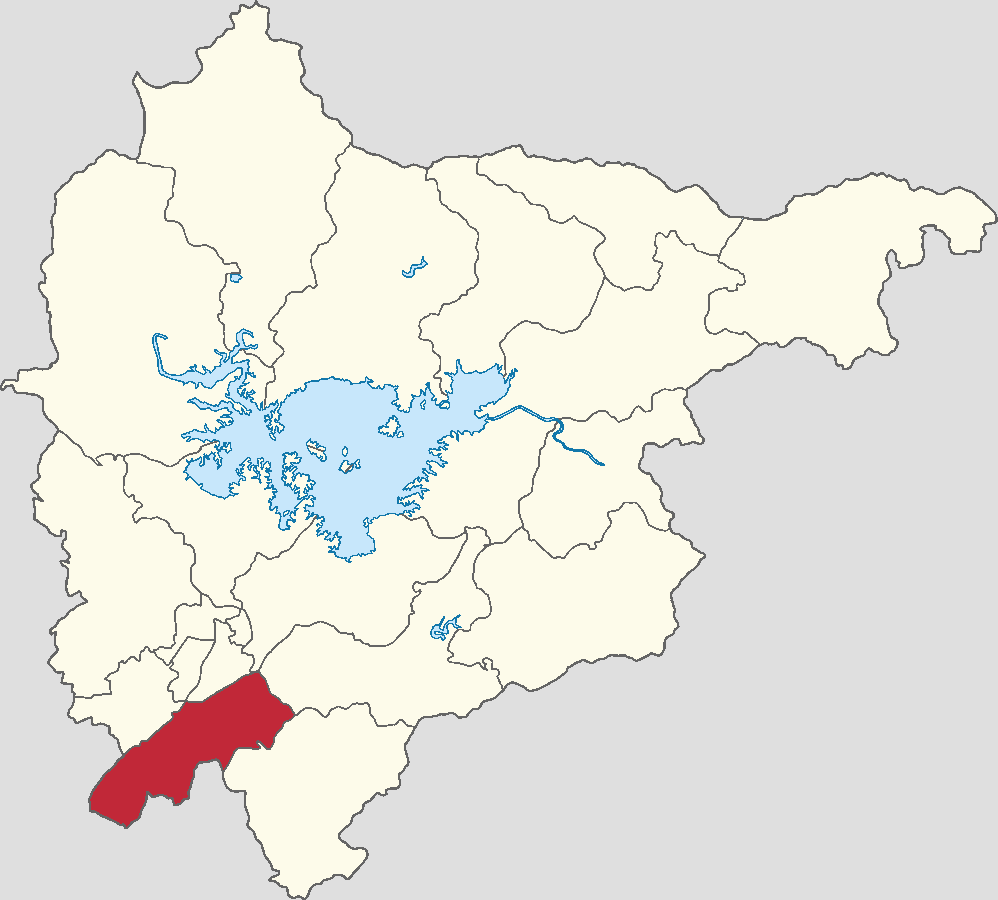
- Location inside of Miyun District

- Location within Beijing Location within China
- Coordinates: 40°19′49″N 116°49′16″E
- Country: China
- Municipality: Beijing
- District: Miyun
- Village-level Divisions: 4 communities 28 villages

Area
  - Total: 64.34 km^{2} (24.84 sq mi)
- Elevation: 62 m (203 ft)

Population (2020)
  - Total: 24,155
  - Density: 375.4/km^{2} (972.4/sq mi)
- Time zone: UTC+8 (China Standard)
- Postal code: 101520
- Area code: 010

Henanzhai Town (simplified Chinese: 河南寨镇; traditional Chinese: 河南寨鎮; pinyin: Hénánzhài Zhèn) is a town located in the Miyun District of Beijing, China. Situated at the northwest of Ligu Mountain, the town shares border with Gulou Subdistrict and Mujiayu Town in the north, Jugezhuang and Dongshaoqu Towns in the east, Mulin Town in the south, as well as Beifang and Shilipu Towns in the west. In the year 2020, the census counted 24,155 residents for this town.

The town got its name Henanzhai (Chinese: 河南寨; lit. 'River South Stockade') for its location south of Chao River.

== History ==
Timeline of Henanzhai's History
Year	Status	Within
1958 - 1961	Henanzhai Township	Miyun County, Beijing
1961 - 1984	Henanzhai People's Commune	Miyun County, Beijing
1984 - 1993	Henanzhai Township	Miyun County, Beijing
1993 - 2015	Henanzhai Town	Miyun County, Beijing
2015–present	Henanzhai Town	Miyun District, Beijing

== Administrative divisions ==
In 2021, Henanzhai Town was made up of 32 subdivisions, where 4 were communities and 28 were villages. They are listed as follows:

Administrative Division Codes	Subdivision names	Name transliterations	Type
110118104001	宁静家园社区	Ningjingjiayuansheqv	Community
110118104002	碧水花园社区	Bishuihuayuansheqv	Community
110118104003	钓鱼壹号院社区	Diaoyuyihaoyuansheqv	Community
110118104004	畔山雅苑社区	Panshanyayuansheqv	Community
110118104201	河南寨村	Henanzhaicun	Village
110118104202	平头村	Pingtoucun	Village
110118104203	赶河厂村	Ganhechangcun	Village
110118104204	脆山子村	Cuishanzicun	Village
110118104205	钓鱼台村	Diaoyutaicun	Village
110118104206	两河村	Lianghecun	Village
110118104207	褚家庄村	Chujiazhuangcun	Village
110118104208	陈各庄村	Chengezhuangcun	Village
110118104209	圣水头村	Shengshuitoucun	Village
110118104210	顶秀庄园村	Dingxiuzhuangyuancun	Village
110118104211	荆栗园村	Jingliyuancun	Village
110118104212	团里村	Tuanlicun	Village
110118104213	茂盛湖村	Maoshenghucun	Village
110118104214	尹家府村	Yinjiafucun	Village
110118104215	南单家庄村	Nanshanjiazhuangcun	Village
110118104216	高各庄村	Gaogezhuangcun	Village
110118104217	辛庄满族村	Xinzhuangmanchucun	Village
110118104218	金会村	Jinhuicun	Village
110118104219	东鱼路村	Dongyulucun	Village
110118104220	金沟村	Jingoucun	Village
110118104221	宿营村	Suyingcun	Village
110118104222	小王庄村	Xiaowangzhuangcun	Village
110118104223	山前村	Shanqiancun	Village
110118104224	郝家疃村	Haojiatuancun	Village
110118104225	东套村	Dongtaocun	Village
110118104226	钓鱼村	Diaoyucun	Village
110118104227	下屯村	Xiatuncun	Village
110118104228	山后村	Shanhoucun	Village

== Transportation ==
Beijing-Chengde Expressway and Miyun-Shunyi Highway passes through the town. Miyun railway station on Beijing–Shenyang high-speed railway is located in Henanzhai Town.

== Gallery ==
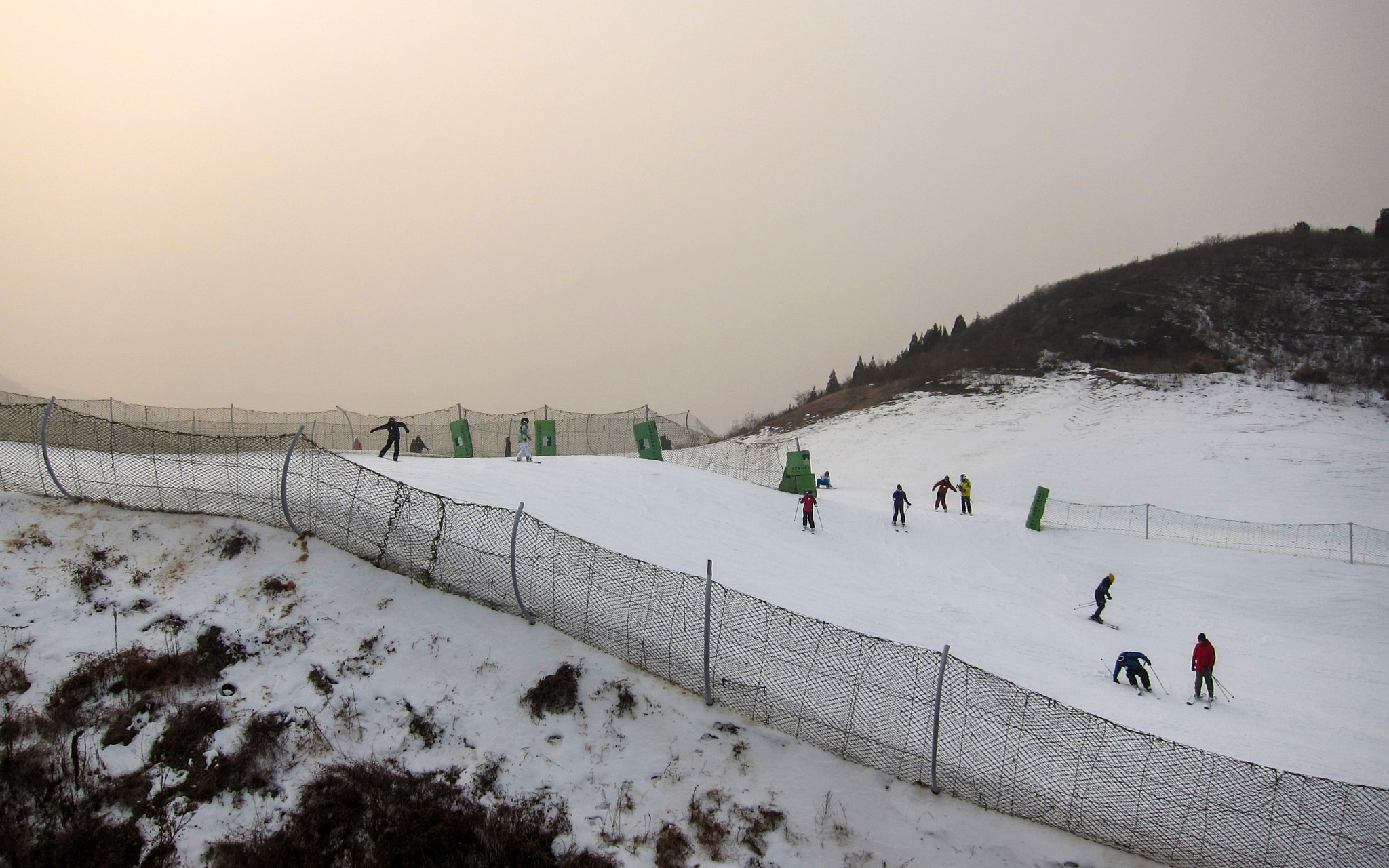
Ski Trails in Beijing Nanshan Ski Resort on the southeast of the town, 2013

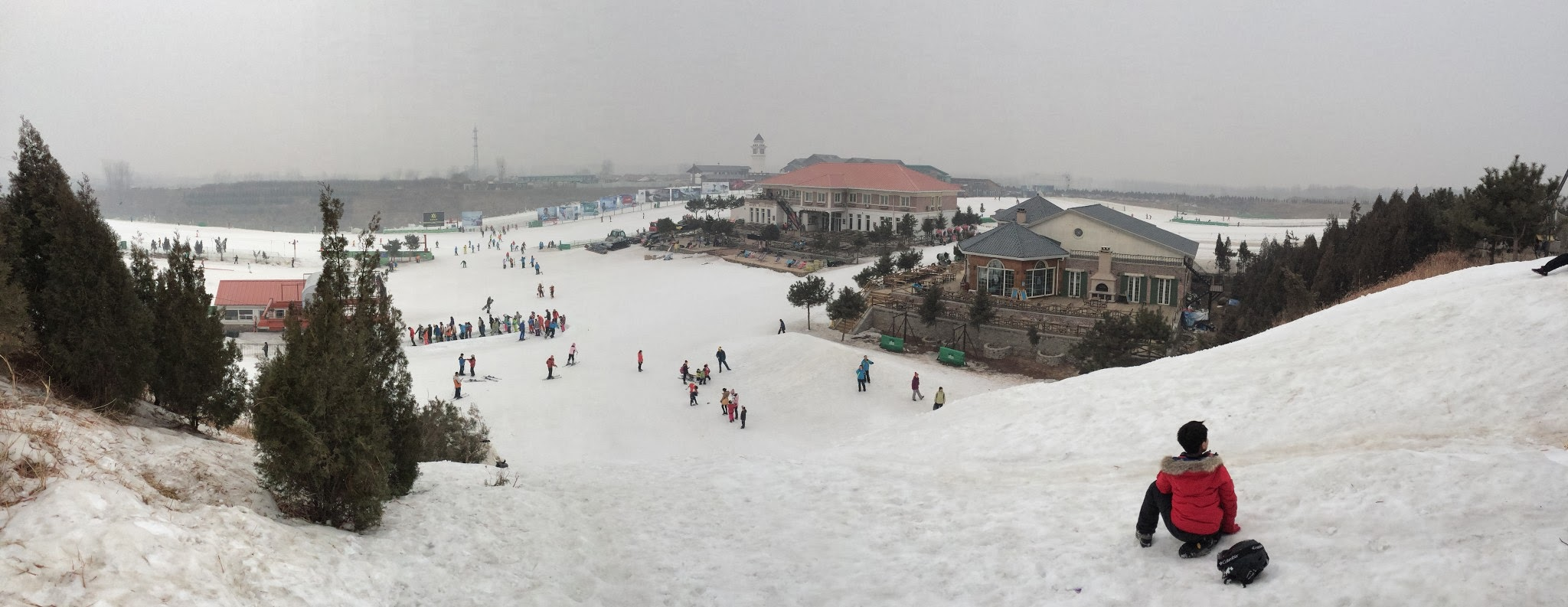
Snow day, 2014

== See also ==
- List of township-level divisions of Beijing
