= Beijing Miyun Economic Development Area =

Beijing Miyun Economic Development Area 北京密云经济开发区
- Analogous Township-level Unit
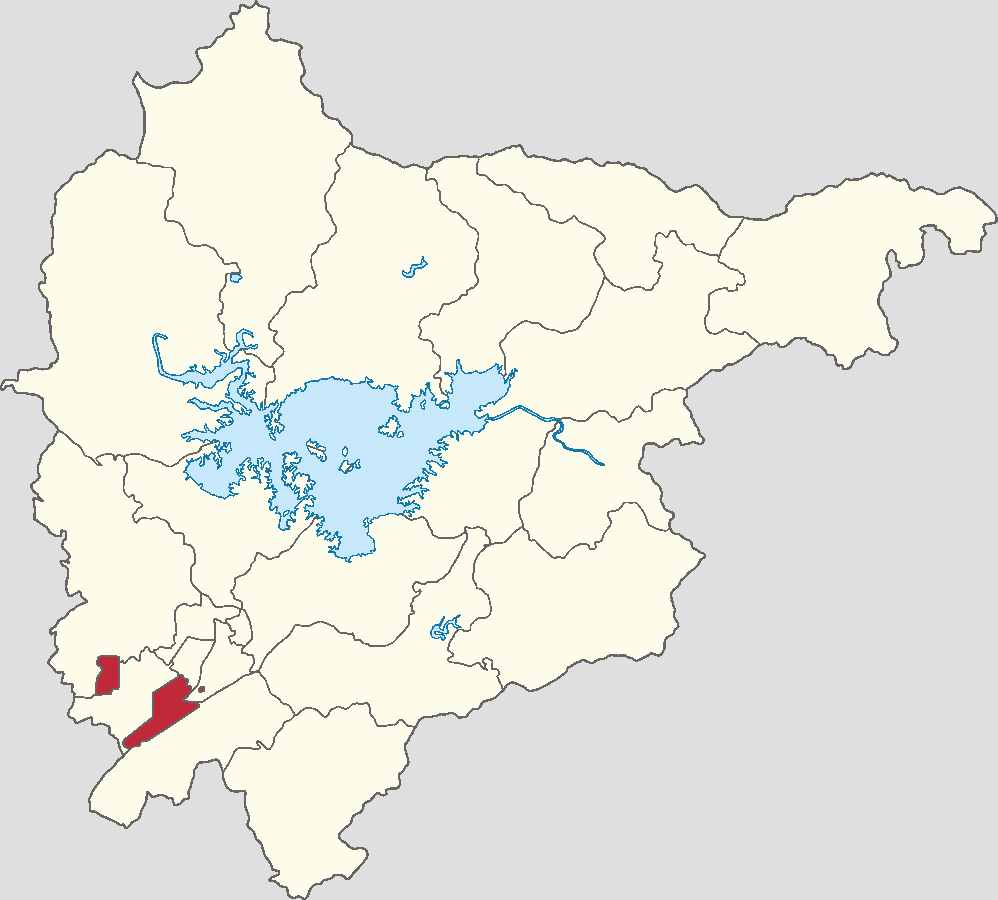
- Location within Miyun District

- Location within Beijing Location within China
- Coordinates: 40°20′26″N 116°47′18″E
- Country: China
- Municipality: Beijing
- District: Daxing

Area
  - Total: 14.33 km^{2} (5.53 sq mi)

Population (2020)
  - Total: 2,899
  - Density: 202.3/km^{2} (524.0/sq mi)
- Time zone: UTC+8 (China Standard)
- Area code: 010

Beijing Miyun Economic Development Area (simplified Chinese: 北京密云经济开发区; traditional Chinese: 北京密雲經濟開發區; pinyin: Běijīng Mìyún Jīngjì Kāifāqū) is a provincial-level economic development zone in Miyun District, Beijing, China. As of 2020, its population was 2,899.

== See also ==
- List of township-level divisions of Beijing
