= Miyun railway station =

Railway station in Miyun, Beijing

Miyun 密云
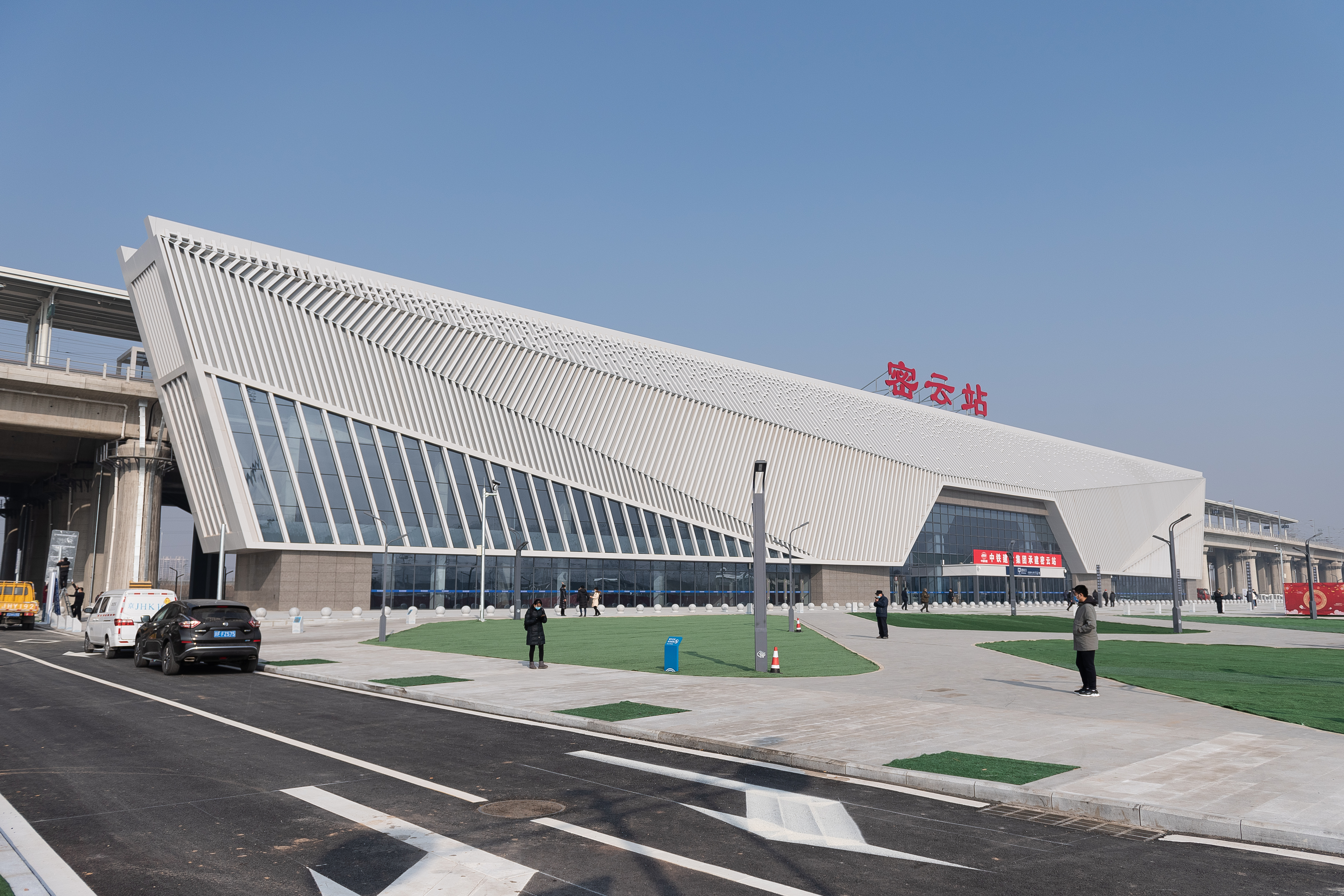
- Station building in January 2021

General information
- Location: Ningcun Village, Henanzhai Town, Miyun, Beijing
- Coordinates: 40.350811°N 116.844702°E
- Operator: China Railway Beijing Group
- Line: Beijing–Shenyang high-speed railway

Construction
- Structure type: Elevated (railway)

Other information
- Station code: 11395 (TMIS code); MYP (telegram code); MYU (pinyin code)

History
- Opened: January 22, 2021
- Former names: Miyun East (密云东)

Services
Preceding station	China Railway High-speed	Following station
Huairou South towards Beijing	Beijing–Shenyang high-speed railway Part of the Beijing–Harbin high-speed railway	Xinglongxian West towards Shenyang
Location

Miyun railway station (Chinese: 密云站; pinyin: Mìyún Zhàn), formerly known as Miyun East railway station (Chinese: 密云东站; pinyin: Mìyún Dōng Zhàn), is a railway station that is a part of the Beijing–Shenyang high-speed railway located in Miyun, Beijing, China. It was opened on 22 January 2021.

== History ==
Construction of the station began on 30 December 2015. The station opened on 22 January 2021, as part of the Beijing-Chengde section of the Beijing-Shenyang high-speed railway. To accommodate the station, new bus lines were opened in January 2021, connecting the station to Gubeikou and Miyun Reservoir, among other attractions.
