= Jugezhuang =

Jugezhuang Town 巨各庄镇
- Town
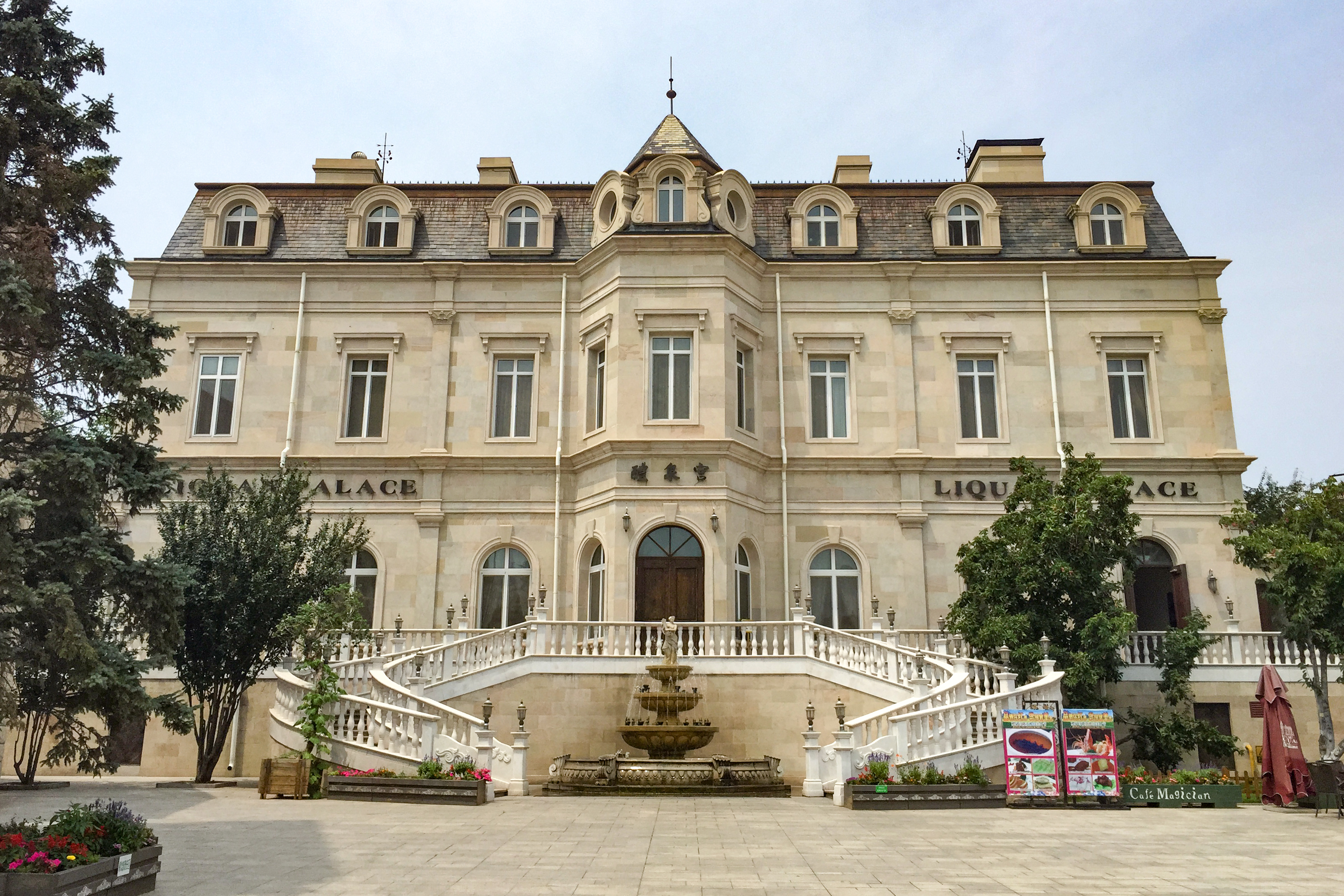
- Liquan Palace, a Chinese-style restaurant within Caijiawa, 2015

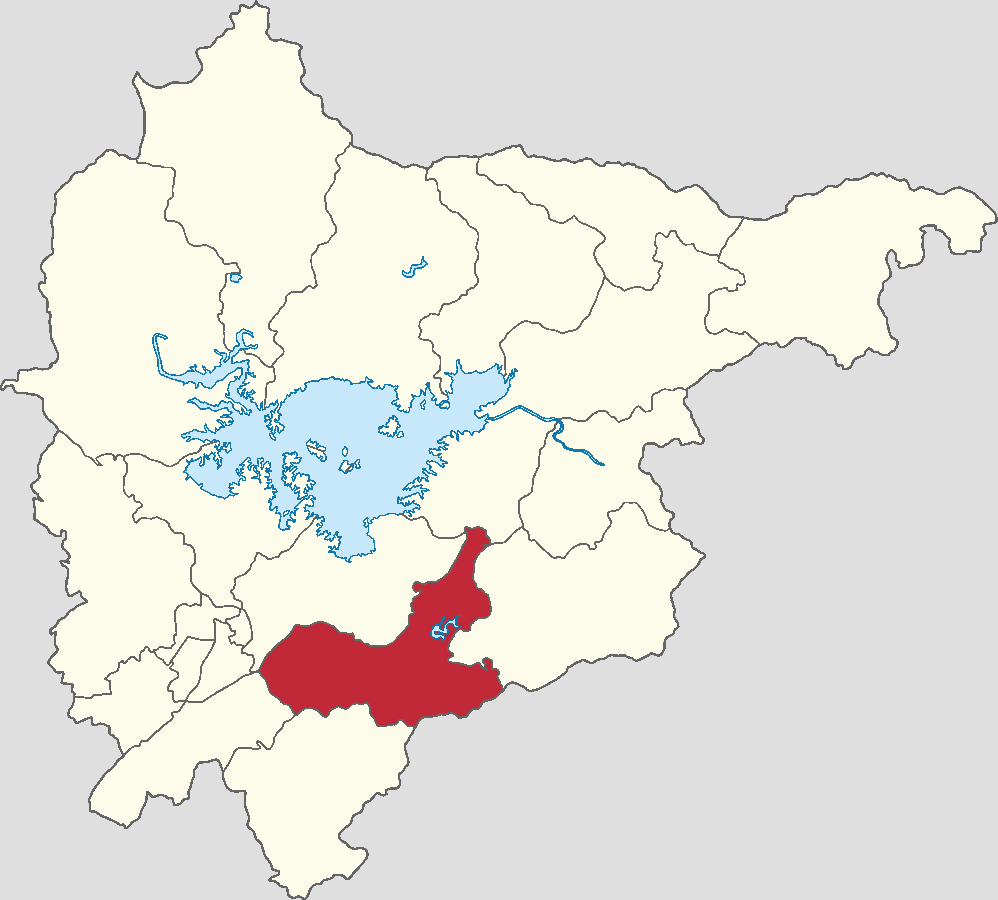
- Location of Jugezhuang Town within Miyun District

- Location within Beijing Location within China
- Coordinates: 40°21′41″N 116°59′09″E
- Country: China
- Municipality: Beijing
- District: Miyun
- Village-level Divisions: 3 communities 26 villages

Area
  - Total: 110.5 km^{2} (42.7 sq mi)
- Elevation: 93 m (305 ft)

Population (2020)
  - Total: 22,032
  - Density: 199.4/km^{2} (516.4/sq mi)
- Time zone: UTC+8 (China Standard)
- Postal code: 101500
- Area code: 010

Jugezhuang Town (simplified Chinese: 巨各庄镇; traditional Chinese: 巨各莊鎮; pinyin: Jùgèzhuāng Zhèn) is a town located in the Miyun District of Beijing, China. it is on the north of a mountainous region. The town is located to the south of Mujiayu and Taishitun Towns, west of Dachengzi Town, north of Dahuashan and Dongshaoqu Towns, and northeast of Henanzhai Town. In 2020, it had 22,032 residents within its borders.

Its name Jugezhuang (Chinese: 巨各庄; lit. 'Ju Family's Village') comes from Jugezhuang Village, the seat of the town's government.

== History ==
History of Jugezhuang Town
Year	Status	Belong to
1958 - 1962	Weixing People's Commune	Miyun County, Beijing
1962 - 1981	Tangzi People's Commune	Miyun County, Beijing
1981 - 1983	Jugezhuang People's Commune	Miyun County, Beijing
1983 - 1990	Jugezhuang Township	Miyun County, Beijing
1990 - 2015	Jugezhuang Town	Miyun County, Beijing
2015–present	Jugezhuang Town	Miyun District, Beijing

== Administrative divisions ==
By the end of 2021, Jugezhuang Town covered 29 subdivisions, more specifically these 3 communities and 26 villages:

Administrative Division Codes	Subdivision names	Name transliterations	Type
110118105001	豆各庄社区	Dougezhuangsheqv	Community
110118105002	新生社区	Xinshengsheqv	Community
110118105003	铁矿社区	Tiekuangsheqv	Community
110118105004	沙厂社区	Shachangsheqv	Community
110118105201	查子沟村	Chazigoucun	Village
110118105202	达峪村	Dayucun	Village
110118105203	楼峪村	Louyucun	Village
110118105204	水树峪村	Shuishuyucun	Village
110118105205	沙厂村	Shachangcun	Village
110118105206	前厂村	Qianchangcun	Village
110118105207	牛角峪村	Niujiaoyucun	Village
110118105208	康各庄村	Kanggezhuangcun	Village
110118105209	海子村	Haizicun	Village
110118105210	久远庄村	Jiuyuanzhuangcun	Village
110118105211	塘子村	Tangzicun	Village
110118105212	赵家庄村	Zhaojiazhuangcun	Village
110118105213	豆各庄村	Dougezhuangcun	Village
110118105214	巨各庄村	Jugezhuangcun	Village
110118105215	八家庄村	Bajiazhuangcun	Village
110118105216	金山子村	Jinshanzicun	Village
110118105217	张家庄村	Zhangjiazhuangcun	Village
110118105218	霍各庄村	Huogezhuangcun	Village
110118105219	水峪村	Shuiyucun	Village
110118105220	黄各庄村	Huanggezhuangcun	Village
110118105221	前焦家坞村	Qianjiaojiawucun	Village
110118105222	塘峪村	Tangyucun	Village
110118105223	后焦家坞村	Houjiaojiawucun	Village
110118105224	丰各庄村	Fenggezhuangcun	Village
110118105225	东白岩村	Dongbaiyancun	Village
110118105226	蔡家洼村	Caijiawacun	Village

== Transportation ==
The Beijing–Chengde railway passes through Jugezhuang.

== See also ==
- List of township-level divisions of Beijing
