= Taishitun =

Town in Miyun,Beijing,China

Taishitun Town 太师屯镇
- Town
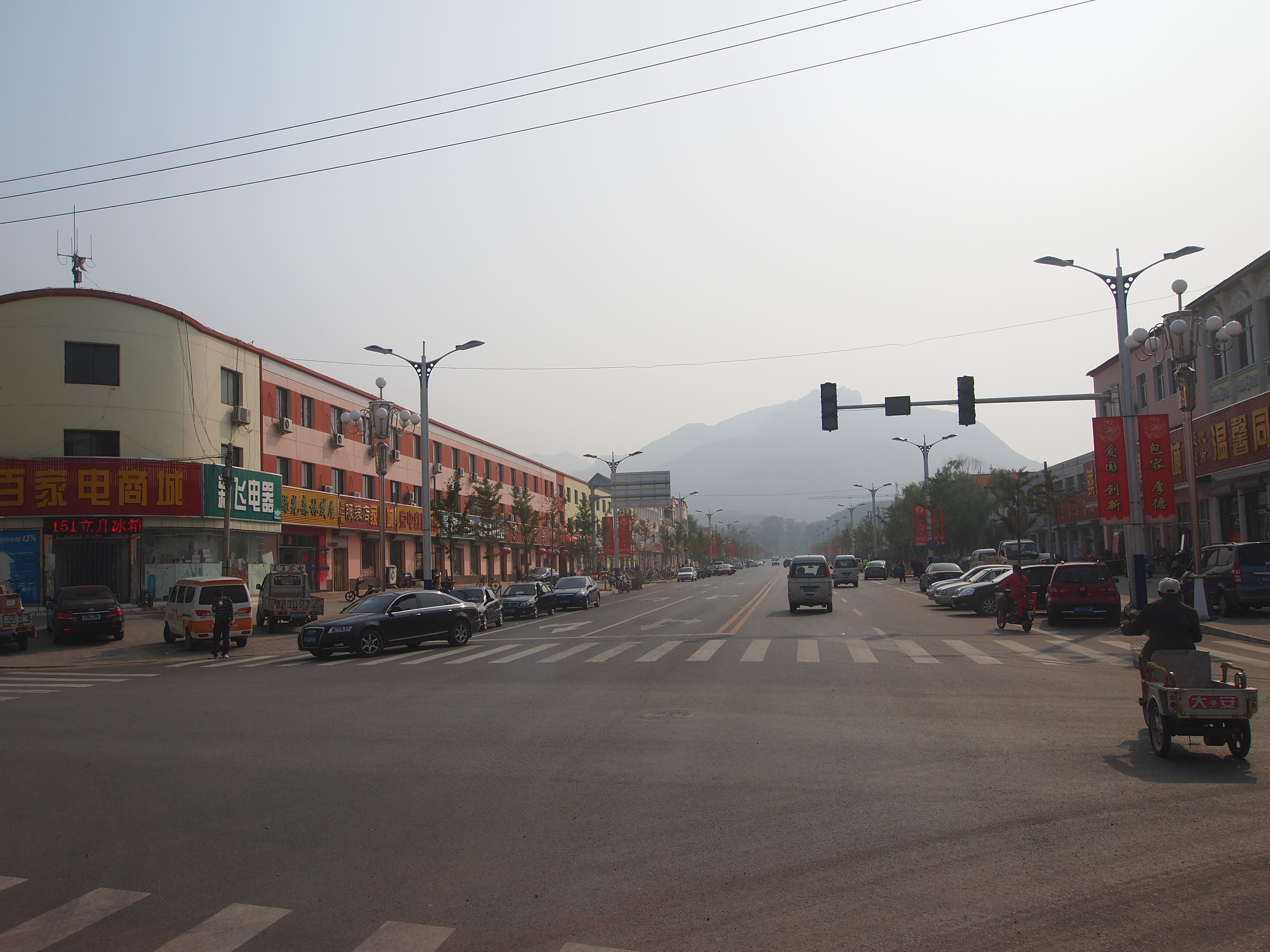
- Yong'an Street within Taishitun Town, 2012

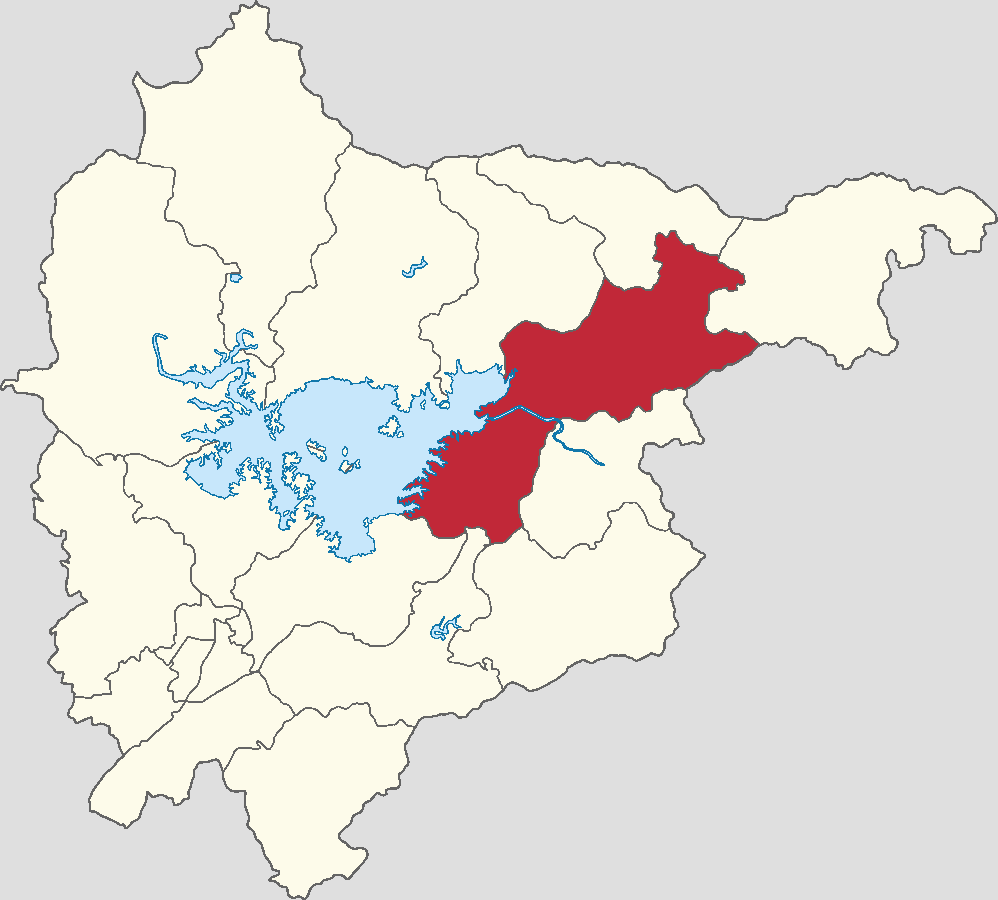
- Location in Miyun District

- Location within Beijing Location within China
- Coordinates: 40°32′11″N 117°07′19″E
- Country: China
- Municipality: Beijing
- District: Miyun
- Village-level Divisions: 5 communities 34 villages

Area
  - Total: 219.9 km^{2} (84.9 sq mi)
- Elevation: 176 m (577 ft)

Population (2020)
  - Total: 22,388
  - Density: 101.8/km^{2} (263.7/sq mi)
- Time zone: UTC+8 (China Standard)
- Postal code: 101505
- Area code: 010

Taishitun Town (simplified Chinese: 太师屯镇; traditional Chinese: 太師屯鎮; pinyin: Tàishītún Zhèn) is a town located in the Miyun District of Beijing, China. Chao River, Qingshui River and Andamu River converge here before flowing into Miyun Reservoir. The town is situated south of Gaoling and Gubeikou Towns, west of Xinchengzi and Wulingshan Towns, northwest of Beizhuang and Dachengzi Towns, as well as northeast of Jugezhuang and Mujiayu Towns. According to the 2020 census, it was home to 22,388 inhabitants.

Prior to the Ming dynasty, this region had been the residence of the Court Astronomer, thus earned the name Taishitun (Chinese: 太史屯; lit. 'Court Astronomer's Village'). Later the name evolved into its current form.

== History ==
Timetable of Taishitun Town
Year	Status	Belong to
1912–1928	Shizha Town	Miyun County, Capital Area
1928–1949	Shizha Town	Miyun County, Hebei
1949–1950	10th District	Miyun County, Hebei
1950–1953	8th District	Miyun County, Hebei
1953–1958	Taishitun Township	Miyun County, Hebei
1958–1960	Taishitun Township	Miyun County, Beijing
1960–1984	Taishitun People's Commune	Miyun County, Beijing
1984–1990	Taishitun Township	Miyun County, Beijing
1990–2015	Taishitun Town	Miyun County, Beijing
2015–present	Taishitun Town	Miyun District, Beijing

== Administrative divisions ==
As of the time in writing, Taishitun Town is divided into 39 subdivisions, in which 5 are communities and 34 are villages. They are organized into the following list:

Subdivision names	Name transliterations	Type
太师屯	Taishitun	Community
光明	Guangming	Community
正阳	Zhengyang	Community
永安	Yong'an	Community
北山	Beishan	Community
黄各庄	Huanggezhuang	Village
许庄子	Xuzhuangzi	Village
流河峪	Liuheyu	Village
前八家庄	Qian Bajiazhuang	Village
后八家庄	Hou Bajiazhuang	Village
龙潭沟	Longtangou	Village
上庄子	Shangzhuangzi	Village
东田各庄	Dong Tiangezhuang	Village
流河沟	Liuhegou	Village
葡萄园	Putaoyuan	Village
太师屯	Taishitun	Village
太师庄	Taishizhuang	Village
上金山	Shangjinshan	Village
大漕村	Da Caocun	Village
小漕村	Xiao Caocun	Village
城子	Chengzi	Village
松树峪	Songshuyu	Village
东学各庄	Dong Xuegezhuang	Village
松树掌	Songshuzhang	Village
桑园	Sangyuan	Village
黑古沿	Heiguyan	Village
前南台	Qian Nantai	Village
后南台	Hou Nantai	Village
头道岭	Toudaoling	Village
光明队	Guangmingdui	Village
二道河	Erdaohe	Village
车道峪	Chedaoyu	Village
沙峪	Shayu	Village
令公	Linggong	Village
南沟	Nangou	Village
石岩井	Shiyanjing	Village
东庄禾	Dongzhuanghe	Village
马场	Machang	Village
落洼	Luowa	Village

== Transportation ==
China National Highway 101 and Daqing–Guangzhou Expressway run through the town.

== Gallery ==
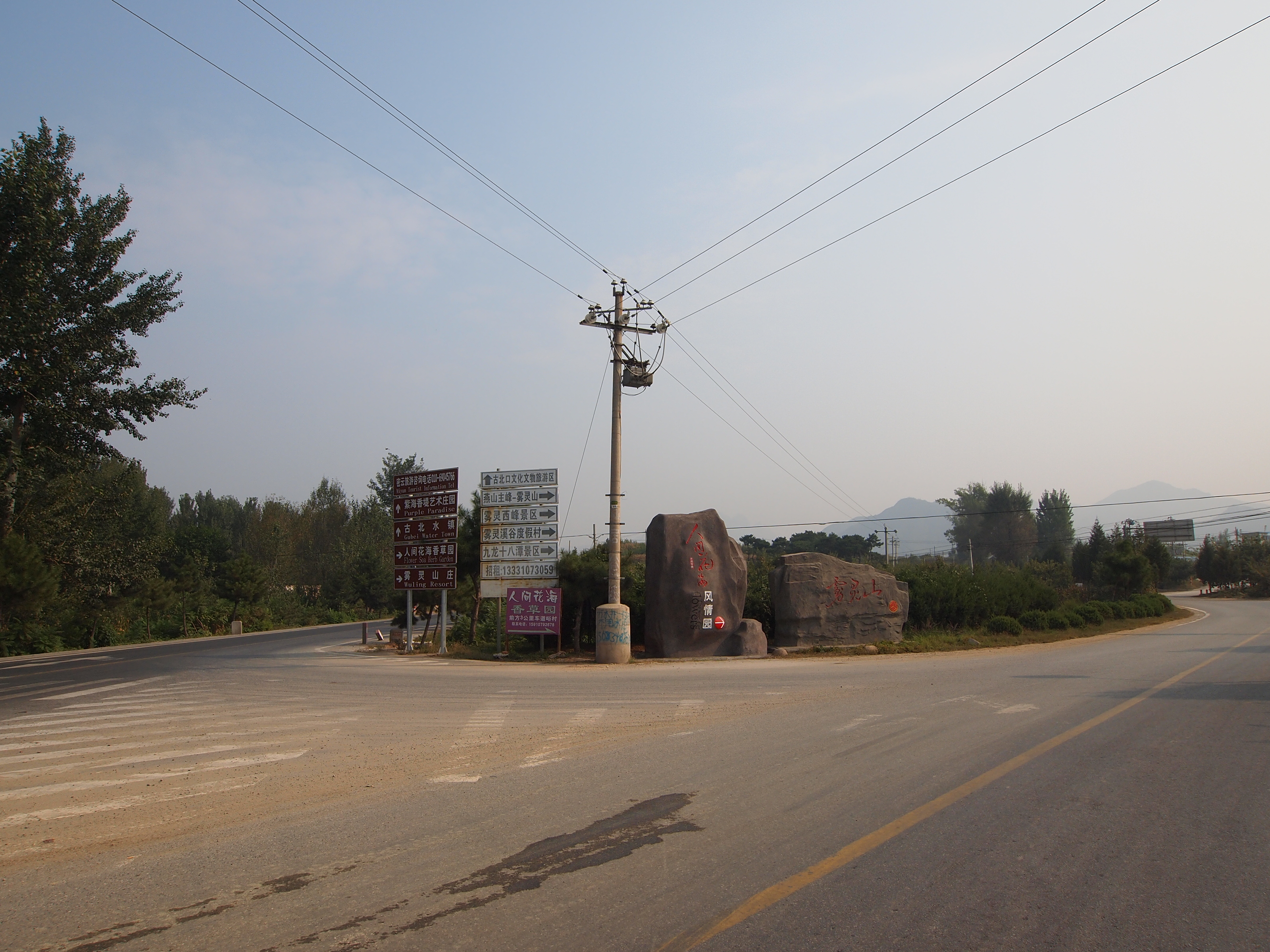
Road to Mt. Wuling near Sangyuan Village, 2012

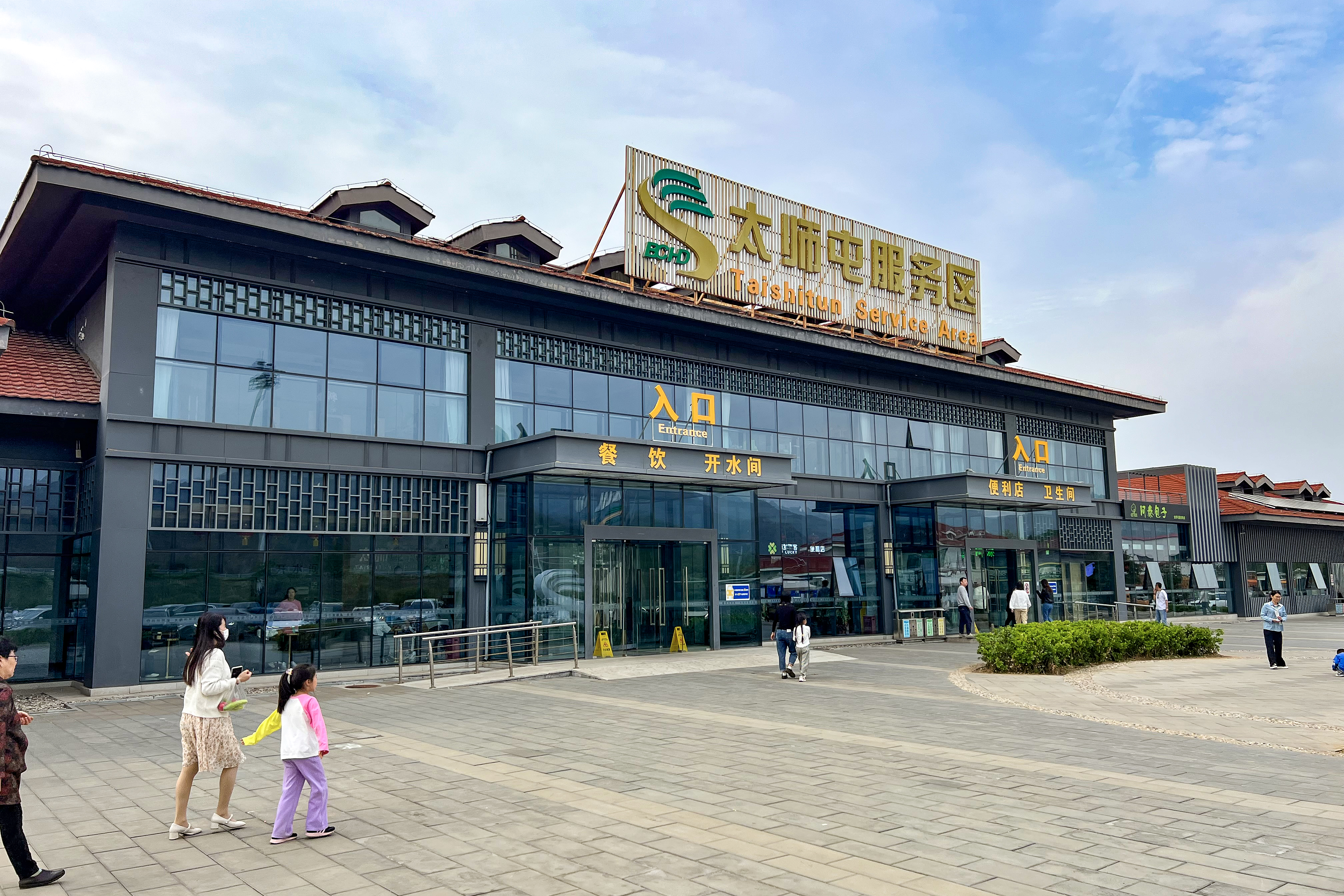
Taishitun Service Area, 2024

== See also ==
- List of township-level divisions of Beijing
