= Mujiayu =

Mujiayu Town 穆家峪镇
- Town
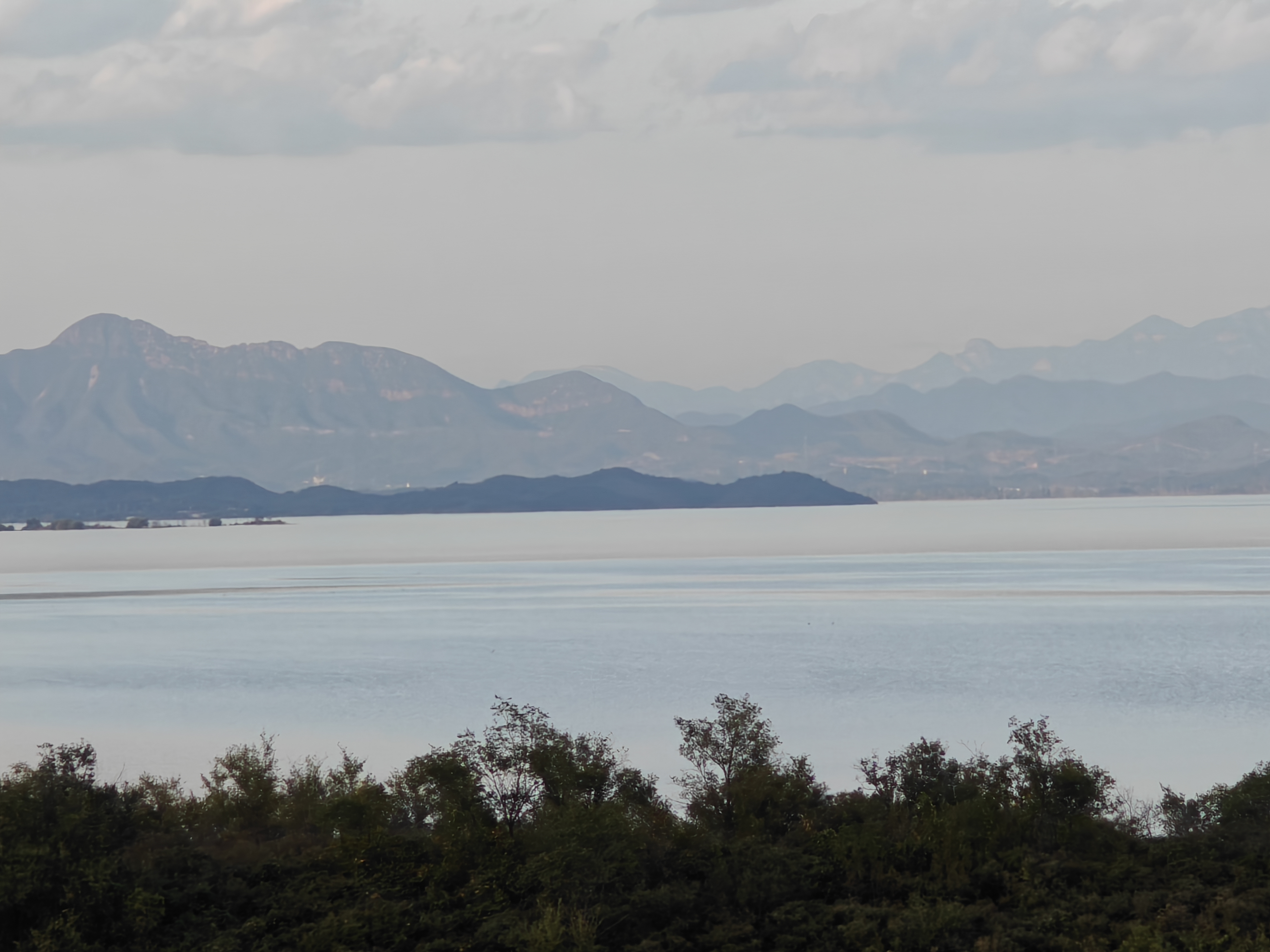
- Miyun Reservoir section under Mujiayu's administration, 2025

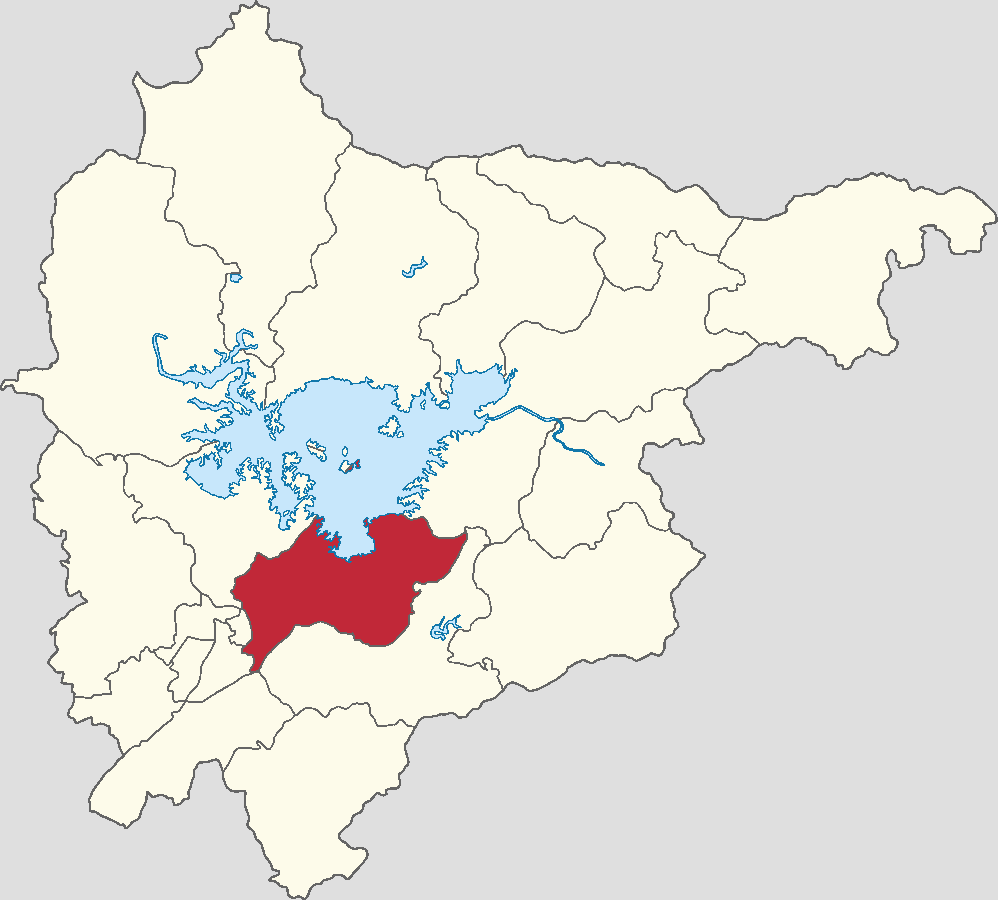
- Location within Miyun District

- Location within Beijing Location within China
- Coordinates: 40°24′35″N 116°55′57″E
- Country: China
- Municipality: Beijing
- District: Miyun
- Village-level Divisions: 3 communities 22 villages

Area
  - Total: 122.8 km^{2} (47.4 sq mi)
- Elevation: 95 m (312 ft)

Population (2020)
  - Total: 23,084
  - Density: 188.0/km^{2} (486.9/sq mi)
- Time zone: UTC+8 (China Standard)
- Postal code: 101500
- Area code: 010

Mujiayu Town (simplified Chinese: 穆家峪镇; traditional Chinese: 穆家峪鎮; pinyin: Mùjiāyù zhèn) is a town located in the Miyun District of Beijing, China. It is situated at the south of Miyun Reservoir. The town shares border with Bulaotun Town in its north, Taishitun Town in its northeast, Jugezhuang and Henanzhai Towns in its south, Tanying Ethnic Township and Gulou Subdistrict in its southwest, and Xiwengzhuang Town in its west. In 2020, it was home to 23,084 inhabitants.

The town was given the name Mujiayu (Chinese: 穆家峪; lit. 'Mu Family's Ravine') for it being the supposed homeland of Mu Guiying, a legendary Chinese heroine during the Song dynasty.

== History ==
Timeline of Mujiayu Town
Year	Status	Within
1965 - 1983	Mujiayu People's Commune	Miyun County, Beijing
1983 - 1987	Mujiayu District	Miyun County, Beijing
1987 - 1993	Mujiayu Township	Miyun County, Beijing
1993 - 2015	Mujiayu Town	Miyun County, Beijing
2015–present	Mujiayu Town	Miyun District, Beijing

== Administrative divisions ==
So far in 2021, Mujiayu Town consists of 25 subdivisions, including 3 communities and 22 villages. They are listed in the table below:

Subdivision names	Name transliterations	Type
穆家峪	Mujiayu	Community
新农村	Xinnongcun	Community
前栗园	Qian Liyuan	Community
刘林池	Liulinchi	Village
新农村	Xinnongcun	Village
前栗园	Qian Liyuan	Village
后栗园	Hou Liyuan	Village
沙峪沟	Shayugou	Village
大石岭	Dashiling	Village
水漳	Shuizhang	Village
达峪沟	Dayugou	Village
荆稍坟	Jingshaofen	Village
羊山	Yangshan	Village
南穆家峪	Nan Mujiayu	Village
北穆家峪回族村	Bei Mujiayu Huizu Cun	Village
九松山	Jiusongshan	Village
西穆家峪	Xi Mujiayu	Village
阁老峪	Gelaoyu	Village
娄子峪	Louziyu	Village
达岩	Dayan	Village
辛安庄	Xin'anzhuang	Village
荆子峪	Jingziyu	Village
上峪	Shangyu	Village
庄头峪	Zhuangtouyu	Village
碱厂	Jianchang	Village

== Transportation ==
Mujiayu Town is connected to Beijing-Chengde Expressway. Beijing–Chengde railway and China National Highway 101 also pass through it.

Beijing Miyun Mujiayu Airport (IATA: YUN) is located here.

== Gallery ==
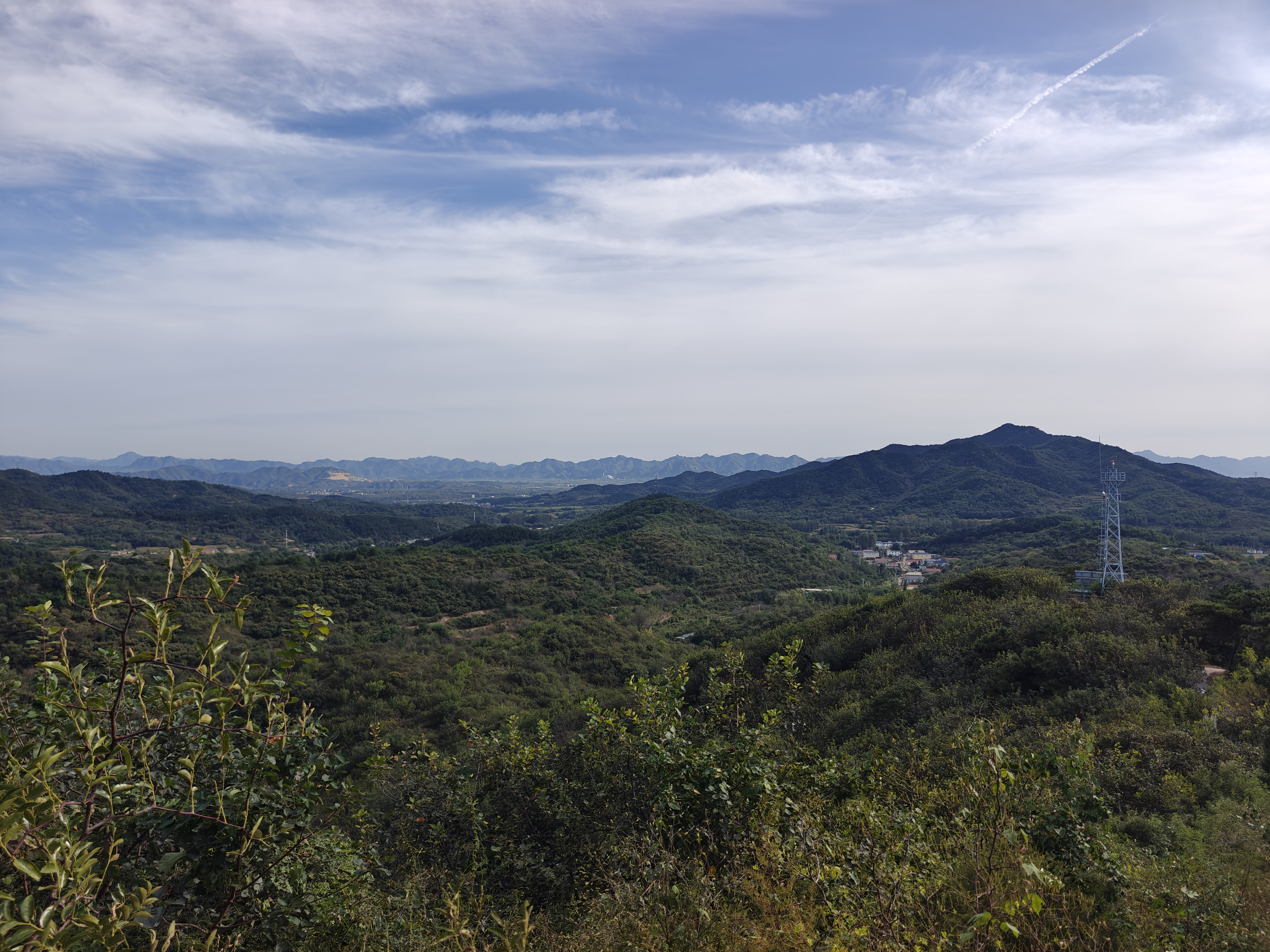
Mountain villages of Mujiayu Town, 2025

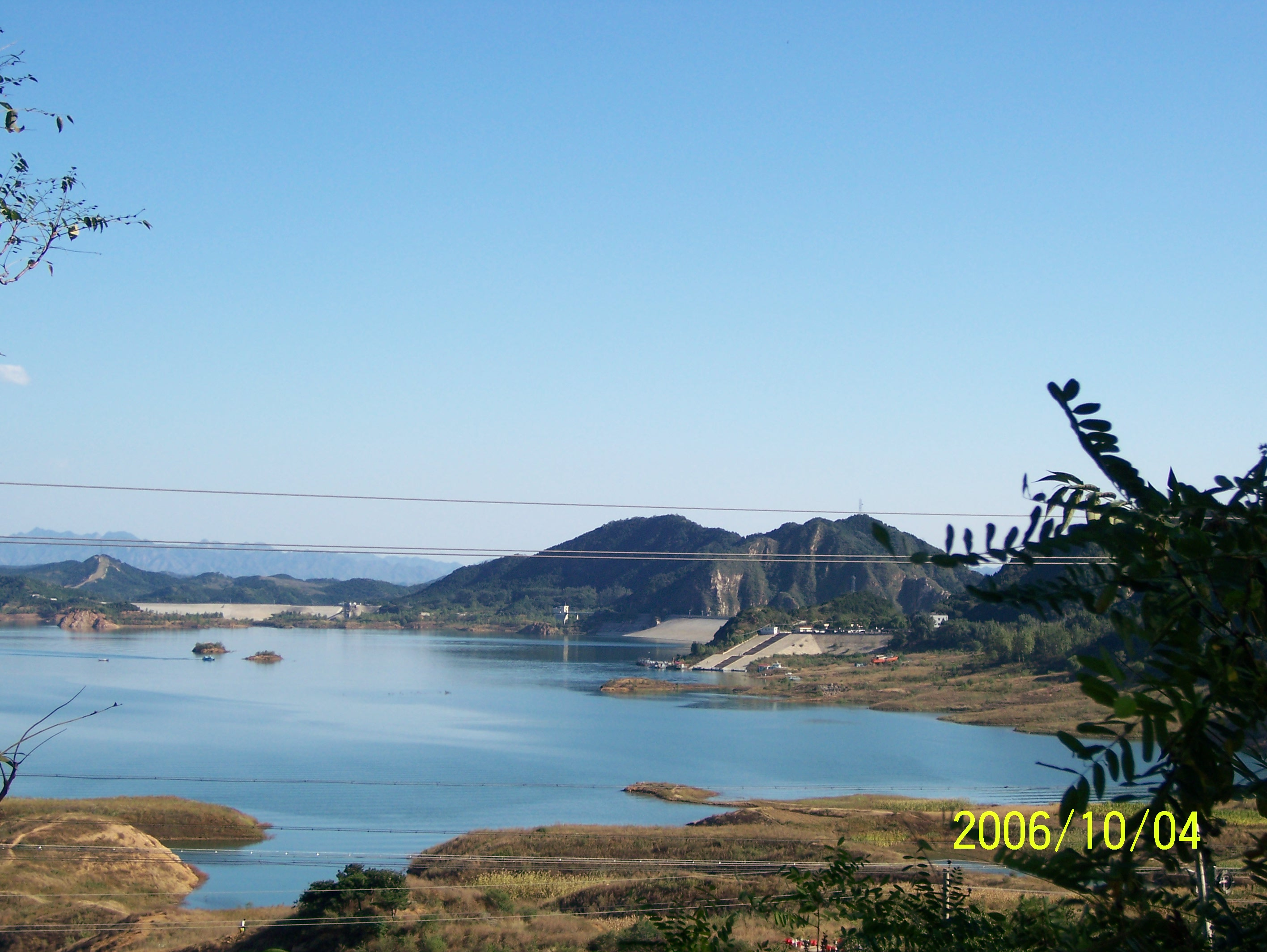
Islands within Miyun Reservoir that are under Mujiayu's administration, 2006

== See also ==
- List of township-level divisions of Beijing
