= Dachengzi, Beijing =

Dachengzi Town 大城子镇
- Town
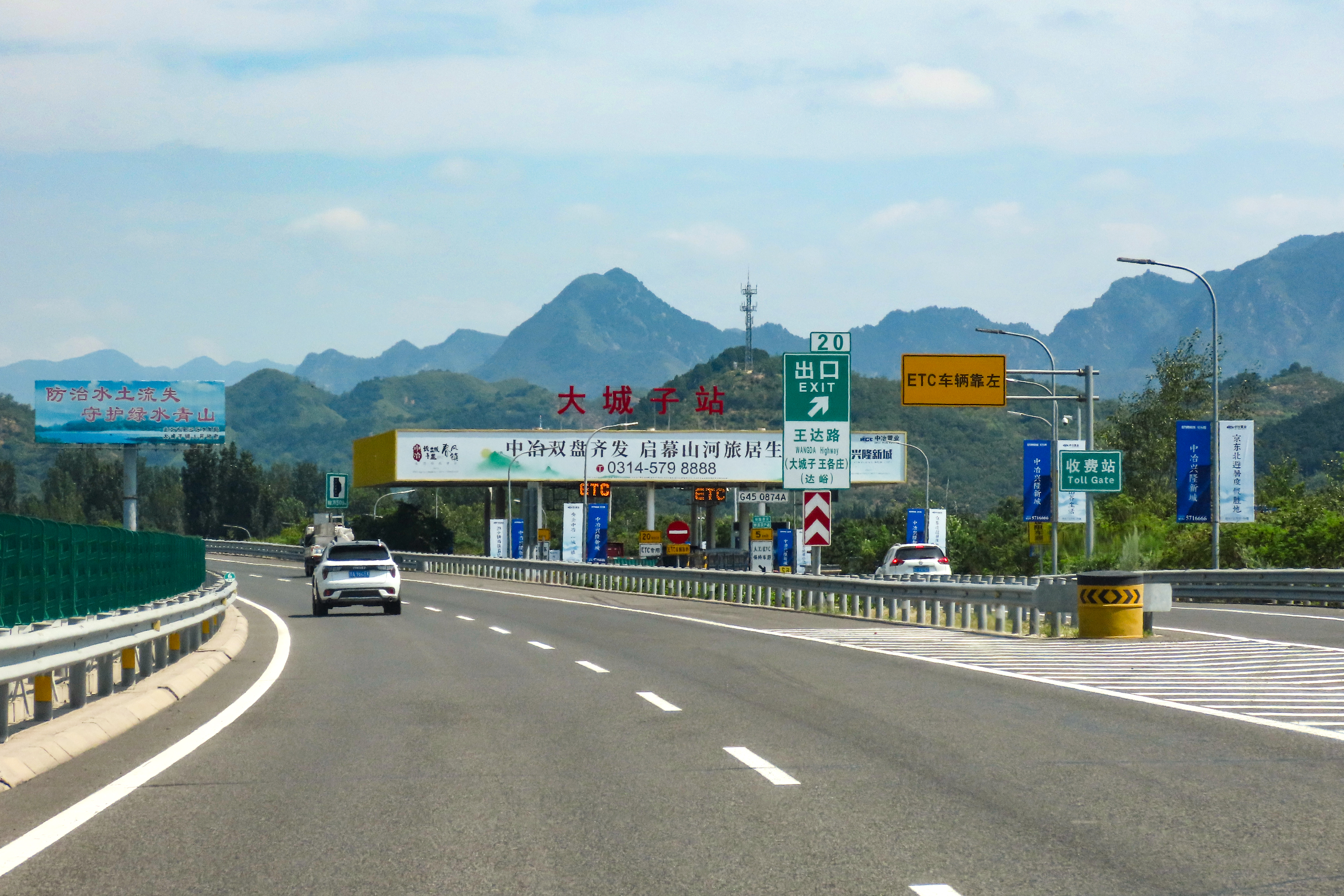
- Wangda Road Exit of Beijing-Chengde Expressway within the town, 2020

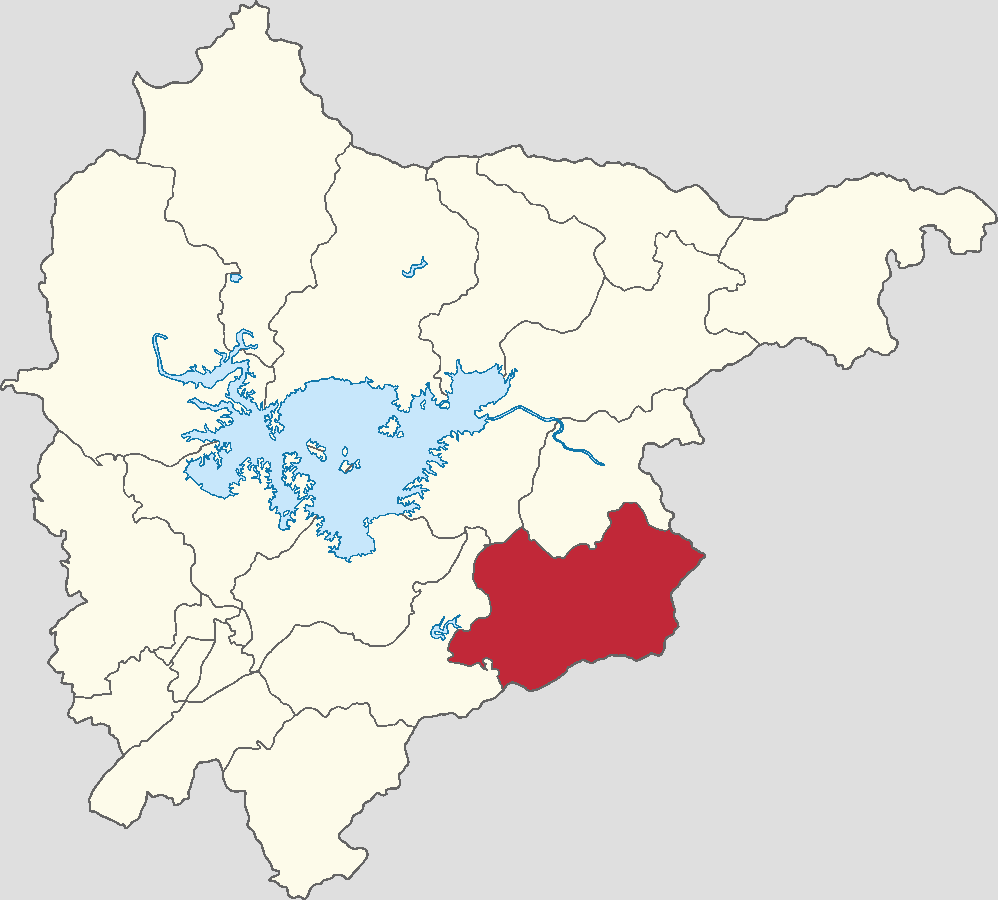
- Location in Miyun District

- Location within Beijing Location within China
- Coordinates: 40°23′31″N 117°06′10″E
- Country: China
- Municipality: Beijing
- District: Miyun
- Village-level Divisions: 1 community 22 villages

Area
  - Total: 142.2 km^{2} (54.9 sq mi)
- Elevation: 222 m (728 ft)

Population (2020)
  - Total: 9,443
  - Density: 66.41/km^{2} (172.0/sq mi)
- Time zone: UTC+8 (China Standard)
- Postal code: 101502
- Area code: 010

Dachengzi Town (simplified Chinese: 大城子镇; traditional Chinese: 大城子鎮; pinyin: Dàchéngzi Zhèn) is a town located in the Miyun District of Beijing, China. It sits within a valley, with Hongmenchuan and Qingshui Rivers flow through it. The town borders Taishitun and Beizhuang Towns in its north, Shangshidong Township and Liudaohe Town in its east, Zhenluoying and Dahushan Towns in its south, and Jugezhuang Town in its west. Its population was 9,443 in 2020.

The name Dachengzi (Chinese: 大城子; lit. 'Big City') comes from Dachengzi Village, the place where the town's government resides in.

== History ==
Timeline of Dachengzi Town
Year	Status	Within
1958 - 1961	Dachengzi Township	Miyun County, Beijing
1961 - 1983	Dachengzi People's Commune	Miyun County, Beijing
1983 - 2000	Dachengzi Township	Miyun County, Beijing
2000 - 2015	Dachengzi Town	Miyun County, Beijing
2015–present	Dachengzi Town	Miyun District, Beijing

== Administrative divisions ==
By the end of 2021, Dachengzi Town administered 23 subdivisions: 1 community and 22 villages. They are listed as follows:

Subdivision names	Name Transliteraions	Type
宏城	Hongcheng	Community
北沟	Beigou	Village
梯子峪	Tiziyu	Village
墙子路	Qiangzilu	Village
南沟	Nangou	Village
下栅子	Xiazhazi	Village
苍术会	Cangshuhui	Village
柏崖	Baiya	Village
程各庄	Chenggezhuang	Village
庄户峪	Zhuanghuyu	Village
张庄子	Zhangzhuangzi	Village
杨各庄	Yanggezhuang	Village
高庄子	Gaozhuangzi	Village
大城子	Dachengzi	Village
聂家峪	Niejiayu	Village
方耳峪	Fang'eryu	Village
后甸	Houdian	Village
王各庄	Wanggezhuang	Village
河下	Hexia	Village
庄头	Zhuangtou	Village
大龙门	Dalongmen	Village
碰河寺	Penghesi	Village
张泉	Zhangquan	Village

== Transportation ==
Beijing-Chengde Expressway, Mixing Road and Beijing–Shenyang high-speed railway are the main roads within the town.

== See also ==
- List of township-level divisions of Beijing
