= Simatai =

Section of the Great Wall of China

Coordinates: 40°38′57.00″N 117°24′42.84″E

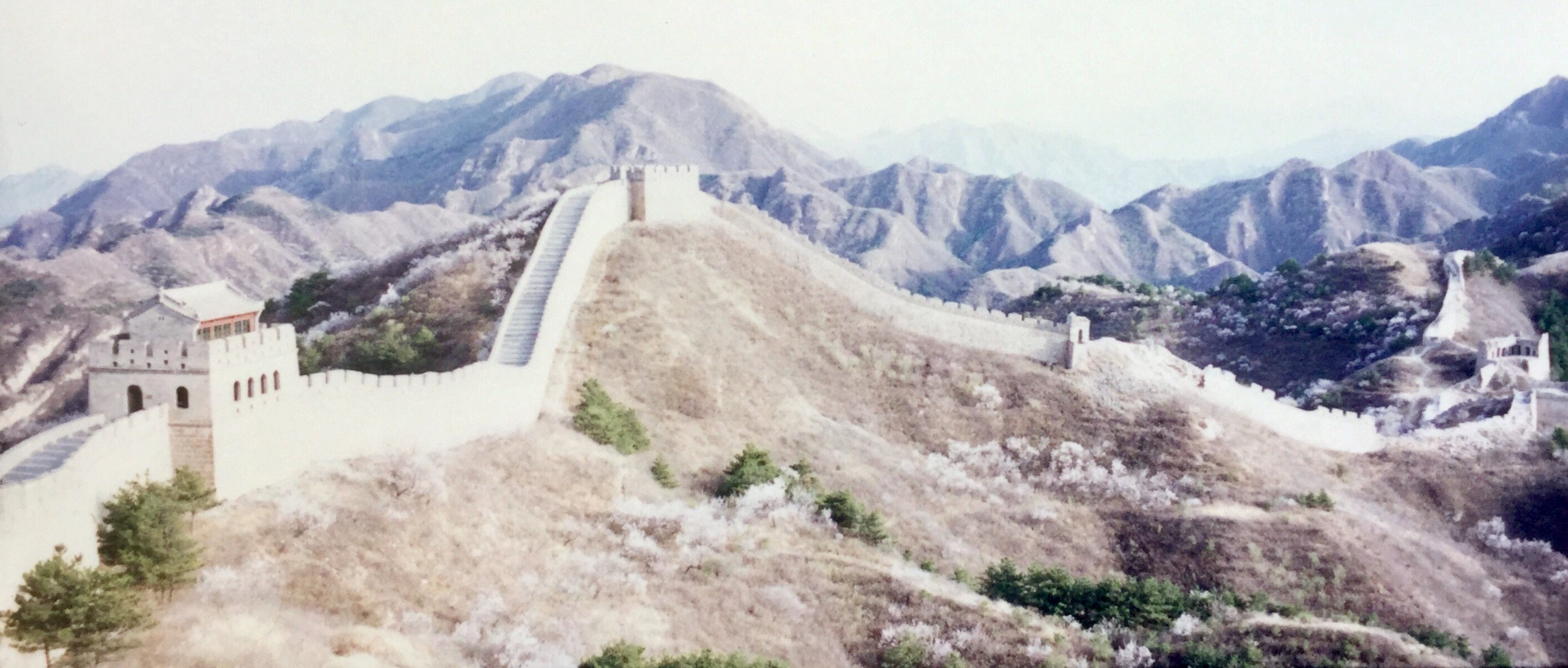
A stretch of the Great Wall at Simatai

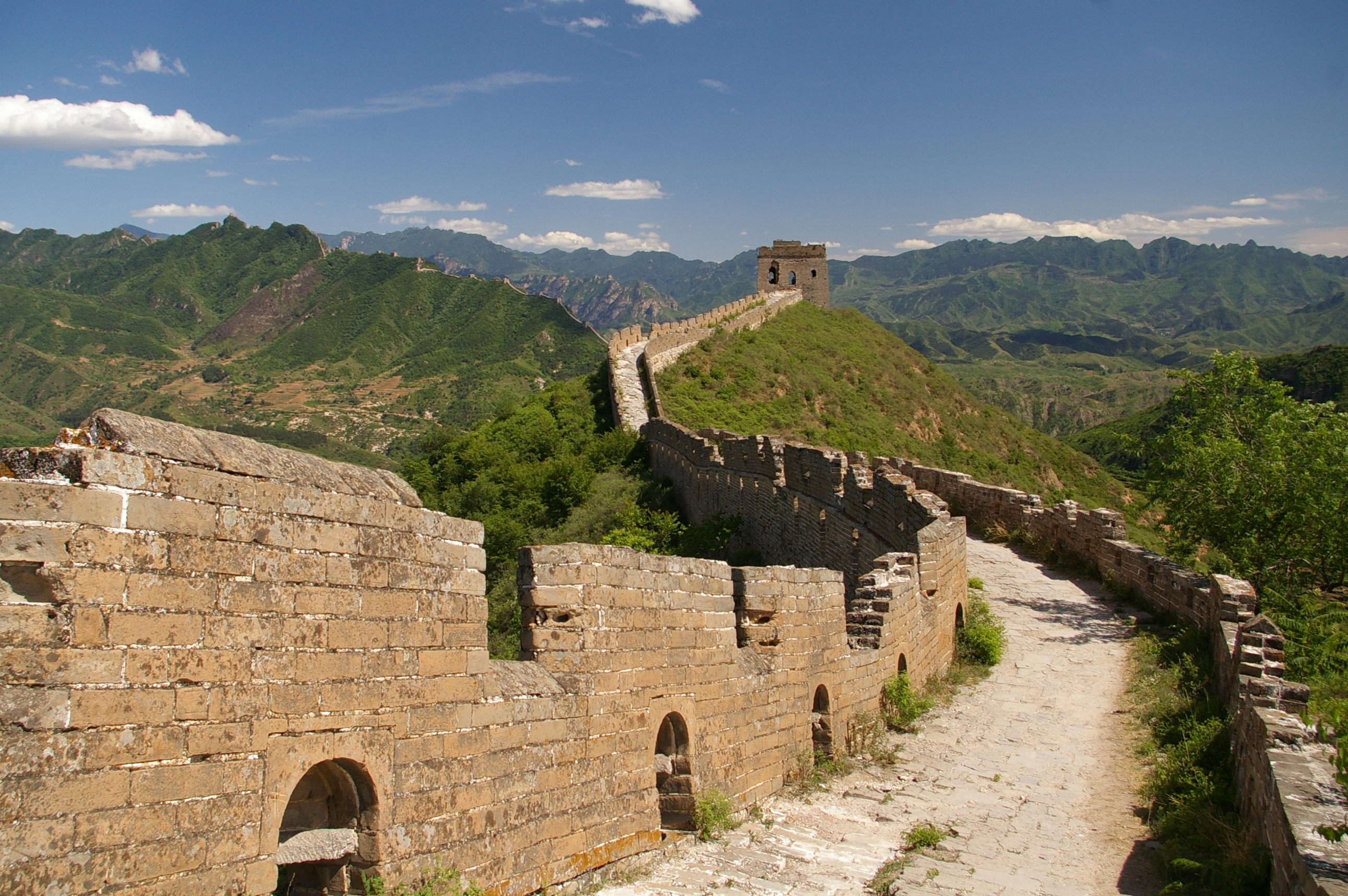
Another stretch of the Great Wall at Simatai

Simatai (Chinese: 司马台; pinyin: Sīmǎtái), a section of the Great Wall of China located in the north of Miyun District, 120 km northeast of the city center of Beijing, holds the access to Gubeikou, a strategic pass in the eastern part of the Great Wall. It was closed in June 2010 but has been reopened to tourists since 2014.

== General ==
The section was originally built during the Northern Qi dynasty (550–577) and rebuilt during the Hongwu Emperor's reign during the Ming dynasty.

Simatai Great Wall is 5.4 km long with 35 beacon towers. This section of the Great Wall incorporated the different characteristics of each section of the Great Wall. A specialist on the Great Wall, Professor Luo Zhewen, has said that "The Great Wall is the best of the Chinese buildings, and Simatai is the best of the Great Wall." UNESCO has designated Simatai Great Wall as one of the World Cultural Heritage Sites as part of the Great Wall World Heritage Site.

Simatai Great Wall is separated by a valley into eastern and western parts. The western part is gently sloped with 20 well-preserved watchtowers dotting along the wall. The eastern part is much steeper, following more rugged terrain that includes cliff edges and kilometre-high peaks.

Hanging precariously onto the Yan Mountains, Simatai Great Wall is known for its steepness. Open-air gondolas provide a way to ascend partway up the wall. The 17 watchtowers are relatively closely spaced and have views of the surrounding area.

== Features ==
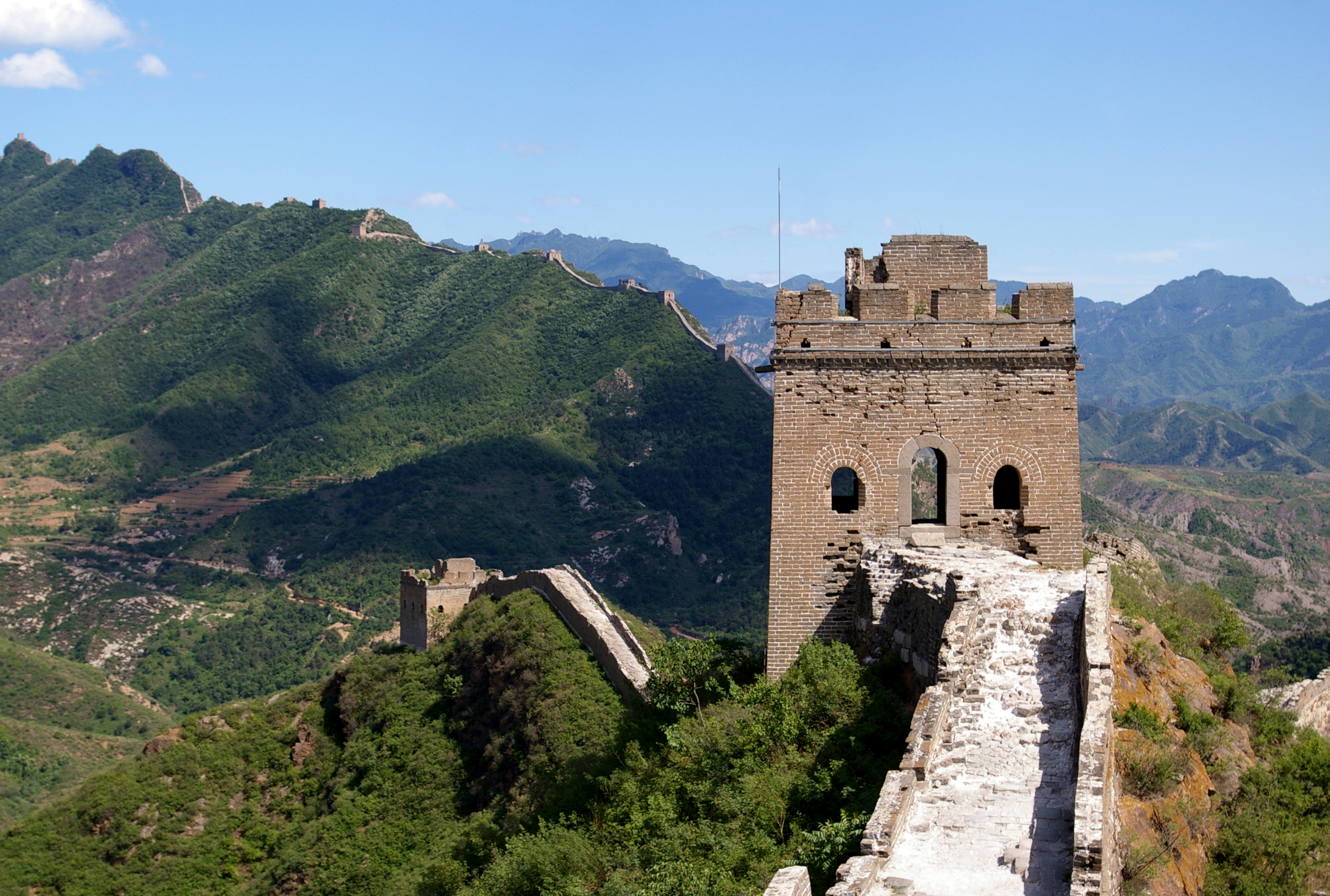
A tower along the Simatai stretch of the Great Wall

- Tower 12- the last accessible tower, generally occupied by a guard preventing access to the more dangerous sections further on.
- Tower 14 - 'Cat's Eye Tower' (Maoyan Lou; 猫眼楼)
- Heavenly Ladder: Climbing the mountainside at a steep 80-degree gradient, the Heavenly Ladder leads to the Fairy Tower. Stretching upward along the abrupt mountain ridges, the narrowest part is just half a meter wide.
- Tower 15 - 'Fairy Tower' (Xiannü Lou; 仙女楼): With a sculpture of twin lotus flowers above the arched doors, it is considered by many to be the most beautiful of all towers and is known for its architecture. Legend has it that it was the dwelling place for an antelope reincarnated in the form of an angel who fell in love with a shepherd.
- Sky Bridge: As little as 40 centimeters wide in places, this 100-meter-long segment of the wall connects the Fairy Tower to Watching Beijing Tower.
- Tower 16 - 'Watching-the-Capital Tower' (Wangjing Lou; 望京楼): At an elevation of 986 meters, it is regarded as the summit of the Simatai Great Wall as well as the highest cultural relic in Beijing. Its name comes from the fact that at night (with good visibility), one can see the lights of Beijing shimmering in the distance 120 km away. The bricks used to build the walls here are stamped with the date on which they were made and the code numbers of the armies that made them.
- Tower 17 - 'Gathering-of-the-Immortals Tower' (Juxian Lou; 聚仙楼) - accessible from the east, from the village of Tangjiazhai (唐家寨).
