= Beizhuang, Beijing =

Town in Miyun,Beijing,China

Beizhuang Town 北庄镇
- Town
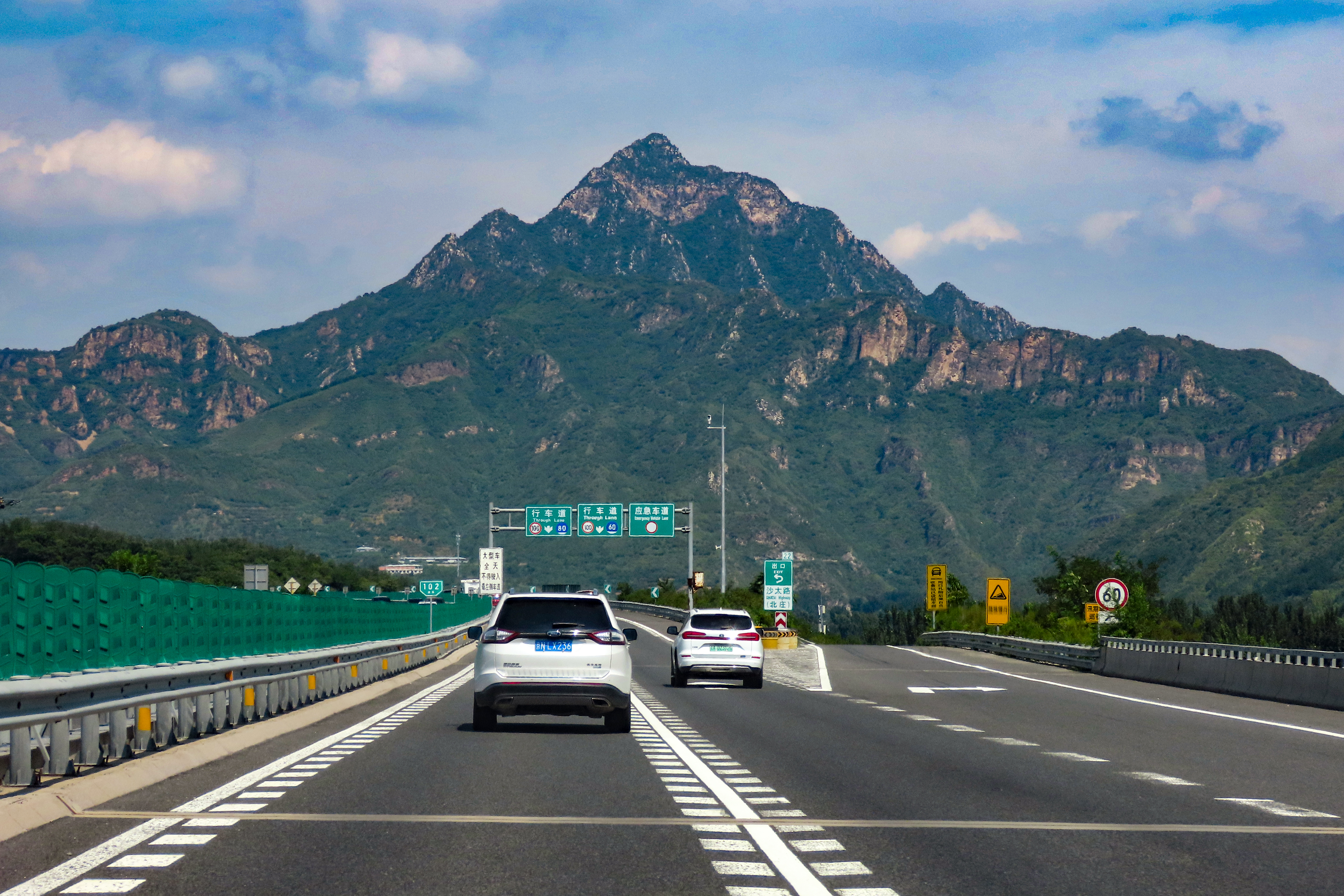
- Weiziyu section of Beijing-Chengde Expressway, 2020

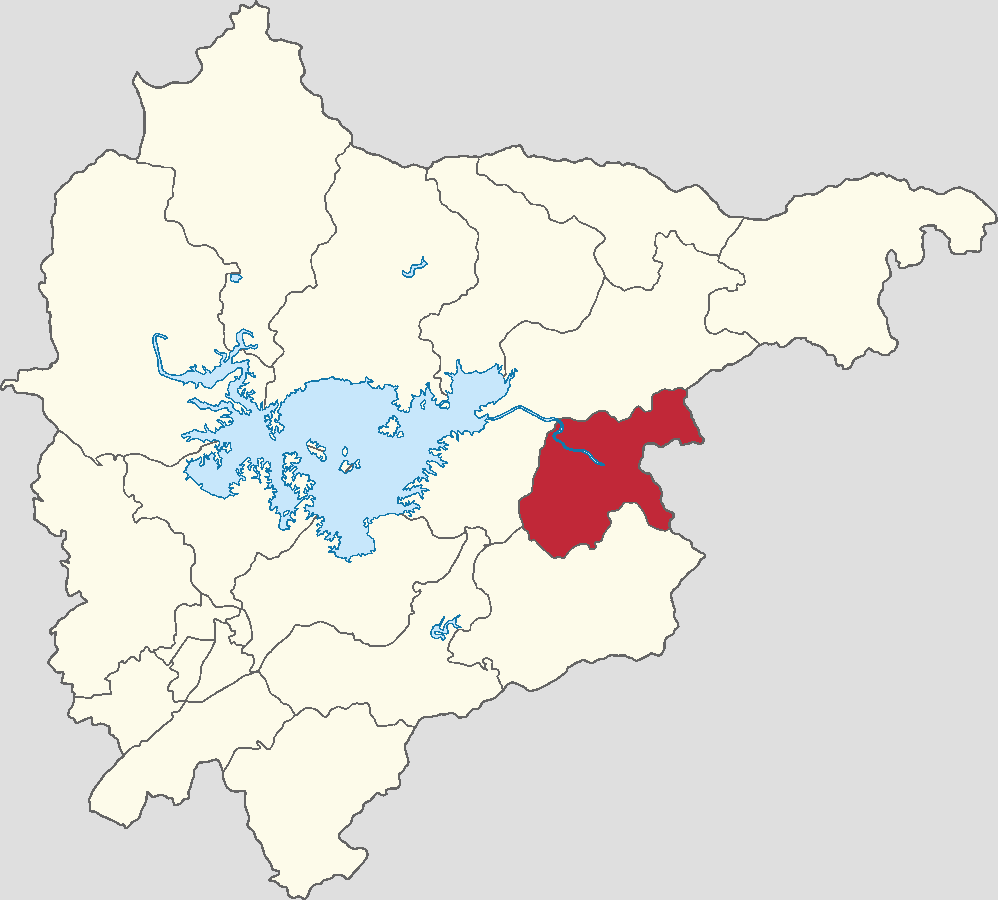
- Location within Miyun District

- Location within Beijing Location within China
- Coordinates: 40°30′29″N 117°10′27″E
- Country: China
- Municipality: Beijing
- District: Miyun
- Village-level Divisions: 1 community 11 villages

Area
  - Total: 84.36 km^{2} (32.57 sq mi)
- Elevation: 222 m (728 ft)

Population (2020)
  - Total: 5,993
  - Density: 71.04/km^{2} (184.0/sq mi)
- Time zone: UTC+8 (China Standard)
- Postal code: 101503
- Area code: 010

Beizhuang Town (simplified Chinese: 北庄镇; traditional Chinese: 北莊鎮; pinyin: Běizhuāng Zhèn) is a town located in the Miyun District of Beijing, China. It lies in a basin inside the Yan Mountain Range, with Qingshui, Daihuangyan and Xiaohuangyan Rivers flowing through it. The town borders Taishitun Town in the north and west, Shimenshan Town in the east, and Dachengzi Town in the south. It had a total population of 5,993 as of 2020.

The name Beizhuang is taken from Beizhuang Village, the seat of the town's government. It can be literally translated as "North Villa".

== History ==
History of Beizhuang Town
Year	Status	Part of
1953 - 1958	Beizhuang Township	Miyun County, Hebei
1958 - 1961	Beizhuang Township	Miyun County Beijing
1961 - 1983	Beizhuang People's Commune	Miyun County Beijing
1983 - 2001	Beizhuang Township	Miyun County Beijing
2001 - 2015	Beizhuang Town	Miyun County Beijing
2015–present	Beizhuang Town	Miyun District, Beijing

== Administrative divisions ==
So far in 2021, Beizhuang Town is subdivided into 12 divisions, of those 1 is a community and 11 are villages. They are listed in the table below:

Subdivision names	Name transliterations	Type
北庄	Beizhuang	Community
暖泉会	Nuanquanhui	Village
朱家湾	Zhujiawan	Village
抗峪	Kangyu	Village
大岭	Daling	Village
土门	Tumen	Village
苇子峪	Weiziyu	Village
东庄	Dongzhuang	Village
干峪沟	Ganyugou	Village
北庄	Beizhuang	Village
营房	Yingfang	Village
杨家堡	Yangjiapu	Village

== See also ==
- List of township-level divisions of Beijing
