= Miyun, Beijing =

Miyun 密云区
- District
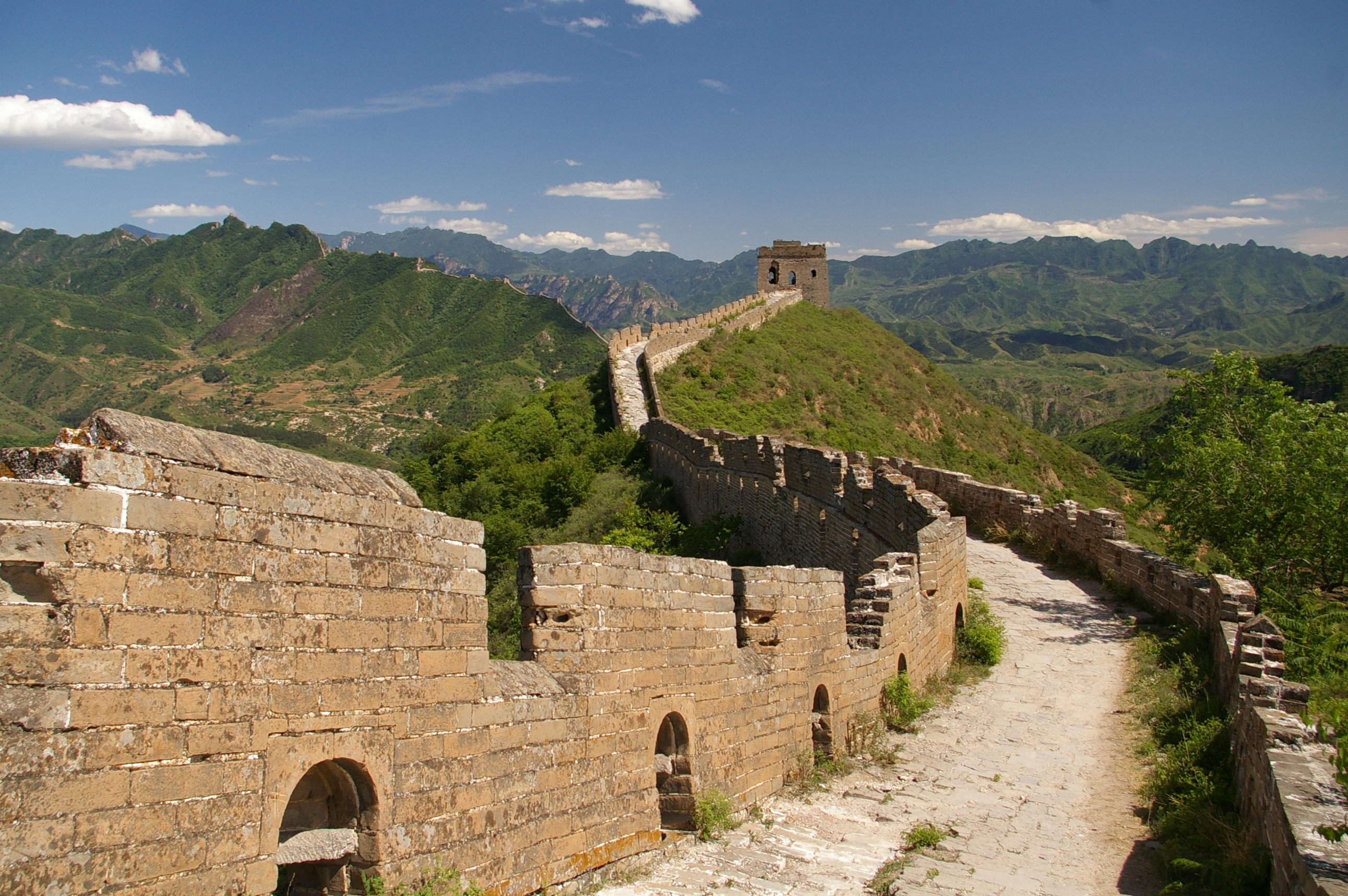
- Simatai Great Wall

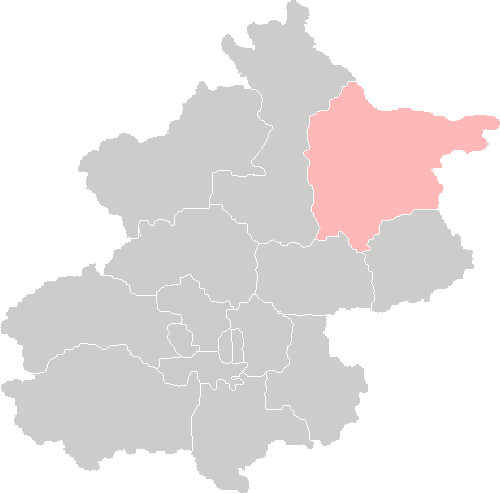
- Location of Miyun District in Beijing
- Interactive map of Miyun
- Coordinates: 40°22′28″N 116°50′22″E
- Country: People's Republic of China
- Municipality: Beijing
- Township-level divisions: 3 subdistricts 17 towns 1 township
- Seat: Gulou Subdistrict

Area
  - Total: 2,227 km^{2} (860 sq mi)

Population (2020)
  - Total: 527,683
  - Density: 236.9/km^{2} (613.7/sq mi)
- Time zone: UTC+8 (China Standard)
- Postal code: 101500
- Area code: 0010
- Website: bjmy.gov.cn

Miyun District (simplified Chinese: 密云区; traditional Chinese: 密雲區; pinyin: Mìyún Qū) is situated in northeast Beijing. It has an area of 2,227 km^{2} (860 sq mi) and a population of 527,683 (2020 Census). Its government seat is located in Gulou Subdistrict.

== History ==
Miyun was one of the places where Warlord Feng Yuxiang stationed his troops in preparation of the Beijing Coup of 1924. In the 1930s, Miyun District was occupied by the Imperial Japanese Army and became part of the area controlled by the East Hebei Autonomous Council, a puppet state of Japan. The Japanese occupation was challenged, however, when a local Taoist priest managed to incite Miyun's peasantry. As member of the Yellow Sand Society, he garnered followers and convinced them that they could become immune to gunfire through magical rituals that he performed. Thus highly motivated, the peasants launched a rebellion in July 1936 and defeated an East Hebei Army unit that was sent to suppress them. Nearby Imperial Japanese Army forces were consequently mobilized against the insurgents. By September, the uprising was defeated and about 300 of Miyun's Yellow Sand rebels had been killed or wounded in the fighting.

== Administrative divisions ==
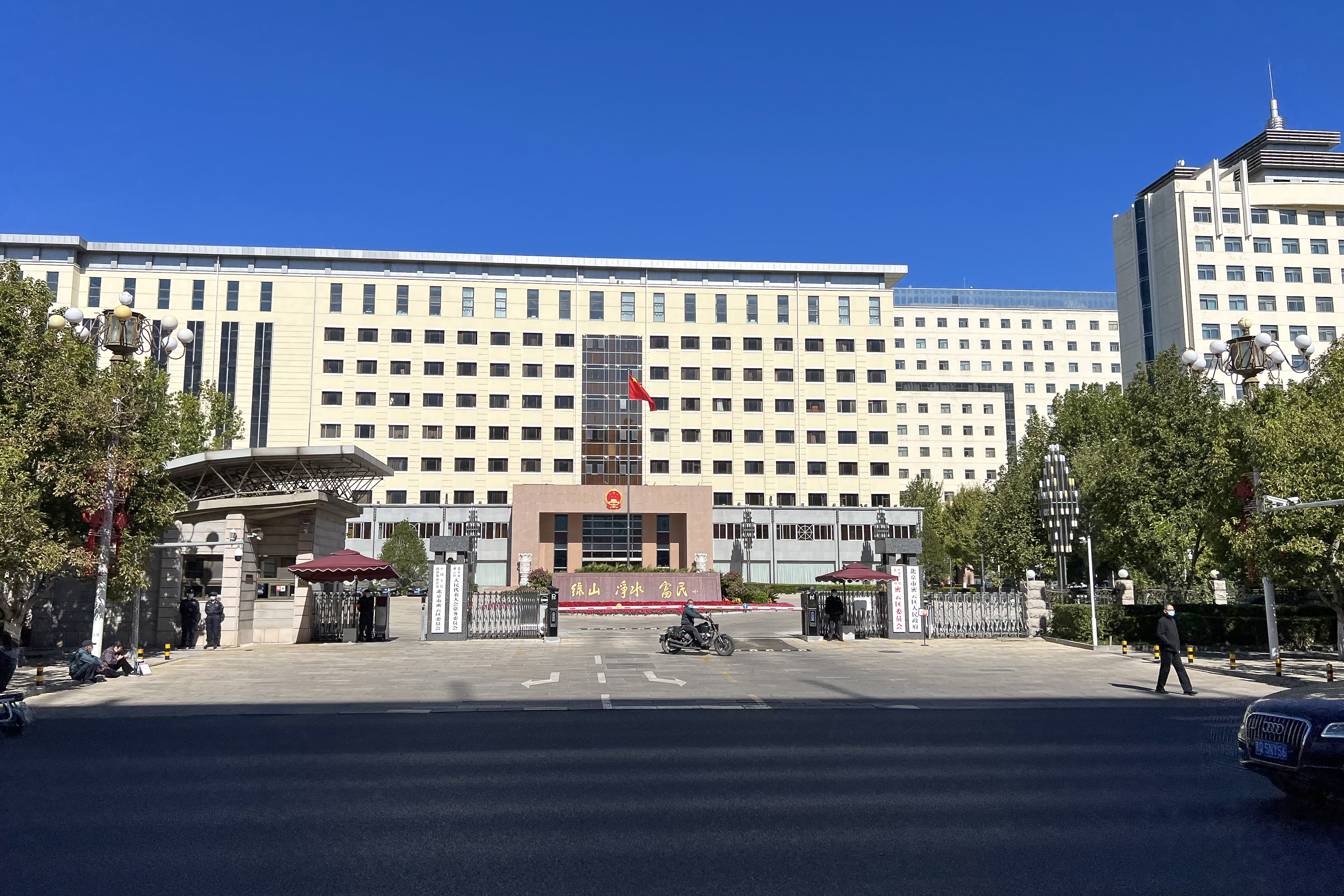
Government building of Miyun District in 2022.

There are 2 subdistricts, 17 towns, and 1 ethnic township in the district. The government seat of Miyun District is located in Gulou Subdistrict.

Name	Chinese (S)	Hanyu Pinyin	Population (2010)	Area (km^{2})
Gulou Subdistrict (district government seat)	鼓楼街道	Gǔlóu Jiēdào	104,479	1.60
Guoyuan Subdistrict	果园街道	Guǒyuán Jiēdào	52,840	7.55
Tanying Manchu and Mongol Ethnic Township	檀营满族蒙古族乡	Tányíng Mǎnzú Měnggǔzú Xiāng Dìqū	7,571	2.73
Miyun town	密云镇	Mìyún Zhèn	18,722	24.00
Xiwengzhuang town	溪翁庄镇	Xīwēng Zhèn	19,811	87.90
Xitiangezhuang town	西田各庄镇	Xītiángèzhuāng Zhèn	36,056	129.60
Shilipu town	十里堡镇	Shílǐpù Zhèn	25,086	30.80
Henanzhai town	河南寨镇	Hénánzhài Zhèn	24,067	66.70
Jugezhuang town	巨各庄镇	Jùgèzhuāng Zhèn	23,017	107.80
Mujiayu town	穆家峪镇	Mùjiāyù Zhèn	33,145	102.80
Taishitun town	太师屯镇	Tàishītún Zhèn	27,311	202.00
Gaoling town	高岭镇	Gāolǐng Zhèn	14,186	111.40
Bulaotun town	不老屯镇	Bùlǎotún Zhèn	15,810	193.20
Fengjiayu town	冯家峪镇	Féngjiāyù Zhèn	6,640	214.25
Gubeikou town	古北口镇	Gǔběikǒu Zhèn	7,932	84.71
Dachengzi town	大城子镇	Dàchéngzi Zhèn	11,648	144.00
Dongshaoqu town	东邵渠镇	Dōngshàoqú Zhèn	12,276	109.30
Beizhuang town	北庄镇	Běizhuāng Zhèn	7,769	83.70
Xinchengzi town	新城子镇	Xīnchéngzi Zhèn	7,993	176.50
Shicheng town	石城镇	Shíchéng Zhèn	5,453	252.80

== Geography ==
Miyun contains the easternmost point of Beijing Municipality, bordering the Beijing districts of Pinggu to the southeast, Shunyi to the southwest and Huairou to the west as well as Hebei province to the due north and east. The Miyun Reservoir, a major source of water for the Beijing Municipality, is also located in Miyun District.

=== Climate ===
Miyun District has a humid continental climate (Köppen climate classification Dwa). The average annual temperature in Miyun is 11.5 °C (52.7 °F). The average annual rainfall is 621.7 mm (24.48 in) with July as the wettest month. The temperatures are highest on average in July, at around 26.2 °C (79.2 °F), and lowest in January, at around −5.5 °C (22.1 °F).

Climate data for Miyun District, elevation 72 m (236 ft), (1991–2020 normals, extremes 1981–2025)
Month	Jan	Feb	Mar	Apr	May	Jun	Jul	Aug	Sep	Oct	Nov	Dec	Year
Record high °C (°F)	13.9 (57.0)	19.2 (66.6)	29.3 (84.7)	31.5 (88.7)	37.2 (99.0)	39.8 (103.6)	40.8 (105.4)	38.1 (100.6)	34.7 (94.5)	30.8 (87.4)	22.8 (73.0)	13.2 (55.8)	40.8 (105.4)
Mean daily maximum °C (°F)	1.8 (35.2)	5.8 (42.4)	12.8 (55.0)	20.8 (69.4)	26.9 (80.4)	30.5 (86.9)	31.4 (88.5)	30.4 (86.7)	26.1 (79.0)	19.1 (66.4)	10.0 (50.0)	3.1 (37.6)	18.2 (64.8)
Daily mean °C (°F)	−5.5 (22.1)	−1.7 (28.9)	5.6 (42.1)	13.9 (57.0)	20.0 (68.0)	24.2 (75.6)	26.2 (79.2)	24.9 (76.8)	19.5 (67.1)	11.8 (53.2)	3.0 (37.4)	−3.7 (25.3)	11.5 (52.7)
Mean daily minimum °C (°F)	−10.8 (12.6)	−7.6 (18.3)	−1.1 (30.0)	6.6 (43.9)	12.7 (54.9)	18.2 (64.8)	21.7 (71.1)	20.5 (68.9)	14.3 (57.7)	6.2 (43.2)	−2.3 (27.9)	−8.7 (16.3)	5.8 (42.5)
Record low °C (°F)	−23.3 (−9.9)	−21.0 (−5.8)	−13.3 (8.1)	−5.0 (23.0)	0.5 (32.9)	8.2 (46.8)	13.7 (56.7)	11.5 (52.7)	2.0 (35.6)	−5.6 (21.9)	−14.6 (5.7)	−19.0 (−2.2)	−23.3 (−9.9)
Average precipitation mm (inches)	2.0 (0.08)	4.2 (0.17)	7.7 (0.30)	20.9 (0.82)	44.3 (1.74)	83.8 (3.30)	196.9 (7.75)	151.0 (5.94)	64.5 (2.54)	30.3 (1.19)	13.4 (0.53)	2.7 (0.11)	621.7 (24.47)
Average precipitation days (≥ 0.1 mm)	1.3	1.9	3.0	4.6	6.8	10.7	13.8	10.9	7.7	5.4	2.9	1.8	70.8
Average snowy days	2.8	2.5	1.7	0.2	0	0	0	0	0	0	2.2	2.8	12.2
Average relative humidity (%)	47	45	44	46	53	63	74	77	72	66	60	53	58
Mean monthly sunshine hours	182.1	180.4	214.4	223.1	246.1	201.1	172.1	191.5	192.1	189.2	162.4	166.5	2,321
Percentage possible sunshine	61	59	57	56	55	45	38	45	52	56	55	58	53
Source: China Meteorological Administration

Climate data for Shangdianzi Township, Miyun District, elevation 293 m (961 ft), (1991–2020 normals)
Month	Jan	Feb	Mar	Apr	May	Jun	Jul	Aug	Sep	Oct	Nov	Dec	Year
Mean daily maximum °C (°F)	0.2 (32.4)	4.2 (39.6)	11.2 (52.2)	19.4 (66.9)	25.8 (78.4)	29.3 (84.7)	30.3 (86.5)	29.5 (85.1)	25.1 (77.2)	18.0 (64.4)	8.6 (47.5)	1.3 (34.3)	16.9 (62.4)
Daily mean °C (°F)	−6.2 (20.8)	−2.4 (27.7)	4.7 (40.5)	12.9 (55.2)	19.0 (66.2)	22.9 (73.2)	24.8 (76.6)	23.6 (74.5)	18.4 (65.1)	11.2 (52.2)	2.4 (36.3)	−4.8 (23.4)	10.5 (51.0)
Mean daily minimum °C (°F)	−11.2 (11.8)	−7.9 (17.8)	−1.4 (29.5)	6.4 (43.5)	12.1 (53.8)	16.9 (62.4)	20.2 (68.4)	19.1 (66.4)	13.1 (55.6)	5.7 (42.3)	−2.6 (27.3)	−9.5 (14.9)	5.1 (41.1)
Average precipitation mm (inches)	1.9 (0.07)	3.7 (0.15)	8.7 (0.34)	24.3 (0.96)	52.6 (2.07)	79.1 (3.11)	166.6 (6.56)	123.0 (4.84)	57.1 (2.25)	31.2 (1.23)	12.8 (0.50)	2.3 (0.09)	563.3 (22.17)
Average precipitation days (≥ 0.1 mm)	1.4	2.0	3.0	4.9	7.2	11.5	13.9	11.2	8.1	5.3	3.2	1.7	73.4
Average snowy days	2.4	2.6	2.1	0.4	0	0	0	0	0	0.2	2.2	2.8	12.7
Average relative humidity (%)	42	41	39	40	49	62	75	76	69	58	51	46	54
Mean monthly sunshine hours	202.5	196.1	232.1	240.9	263.4	228.4	201.9	223.4	219.0	212.4	184.6	191.1	2,595.8
Percentage possible sunshine	68	65	62	60	59	51	44	53	59	63	63	67	60
Source: China Meteorological Administration

== Tourism ==
A popular tourist attraction in Miyun district is Simatai, a section of the Great Wall. Another is Nanshan Ski Resort, one of the largest in the country.

== Transportation ==
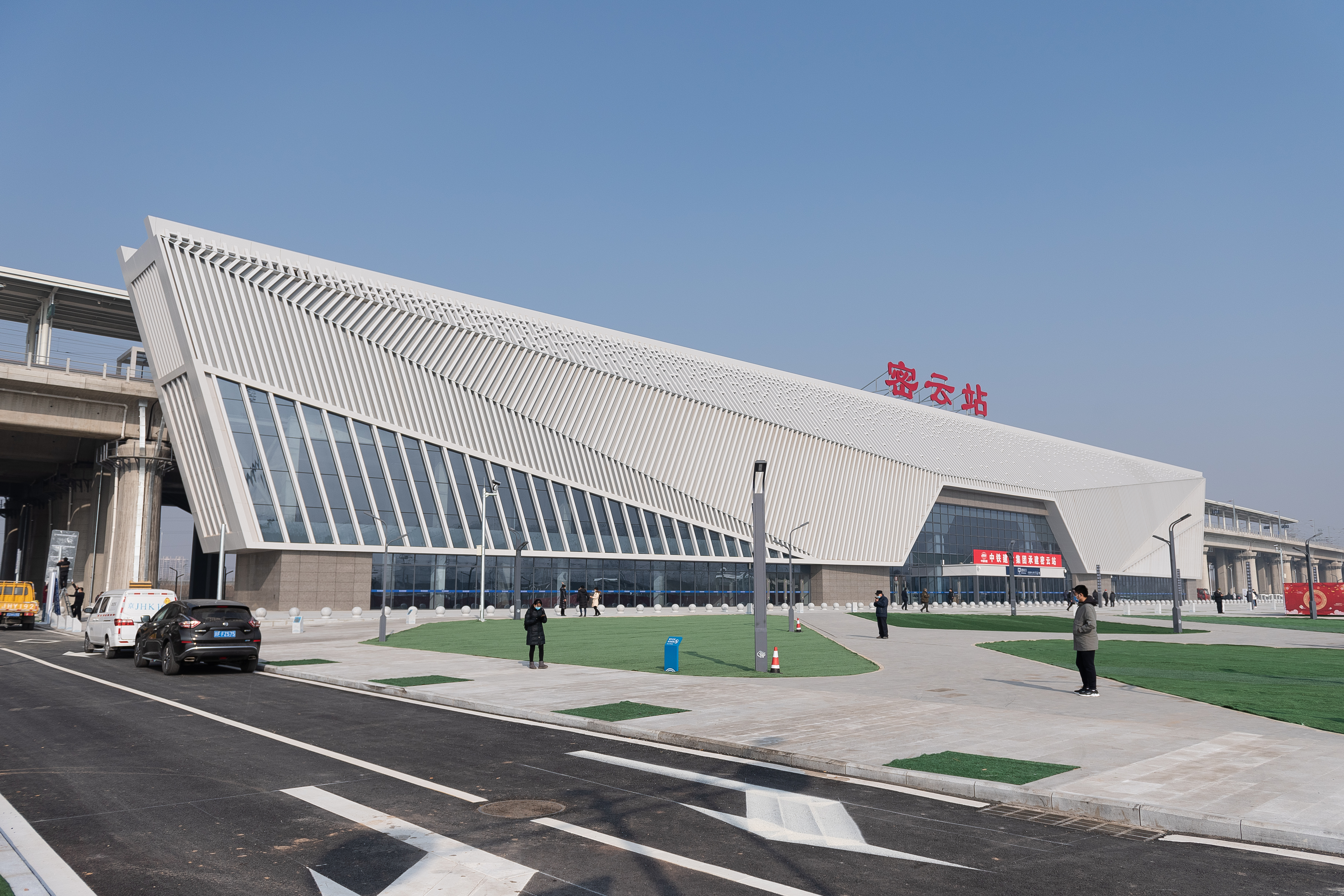
Miyun railway station.

- Beijing–Shenyang high-speed railway: Miyun railway station.
- Beijing–Chengde railway: Miyun North railway station.

== Bibliography ==
- Sheridan, James E. (1966). Chinese Warlord. The Career of Feng Yü-hsiang. Stanford, California: Stanford University Press.
- Morning Tribune Staff (30 July 1936). "Yellow Sand Cult to be suppressed by Japanese". Morning Tribune. Vol. 1, no. 154. Peiping. p. 9.
- The China Monthly Review Staff (20 August 1936). ""Yellow Sand" Society Suppressed by Japanese in Demilitarized Zone". The China Monthly Review. Vol. 77. Custom House, Shanghai. p. 473.
