= Dongshaoqu =

Dongshaoqu Town 东邵渠镇
- Town
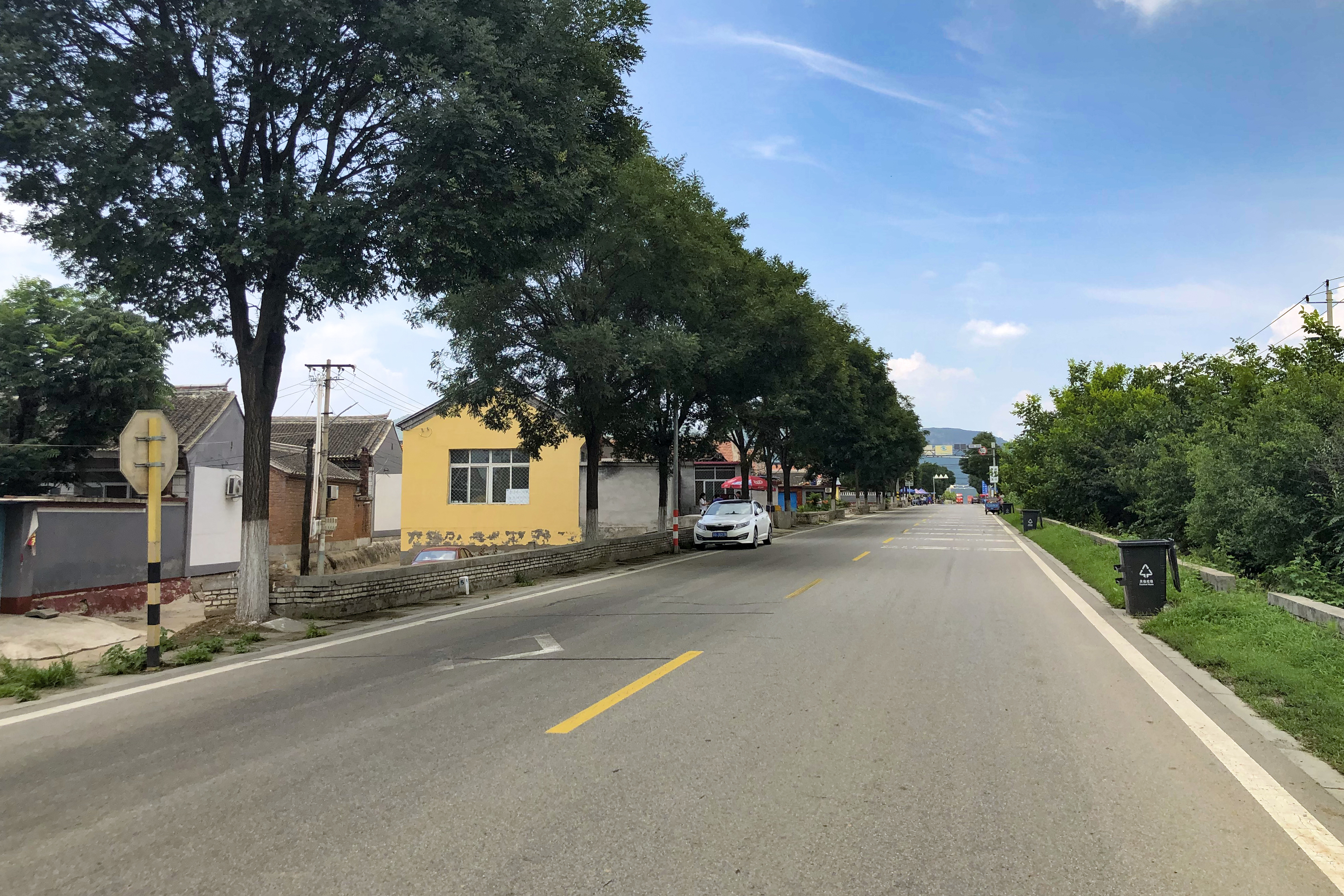
- Shi'e Village within Dongshaoqu Town, 2020

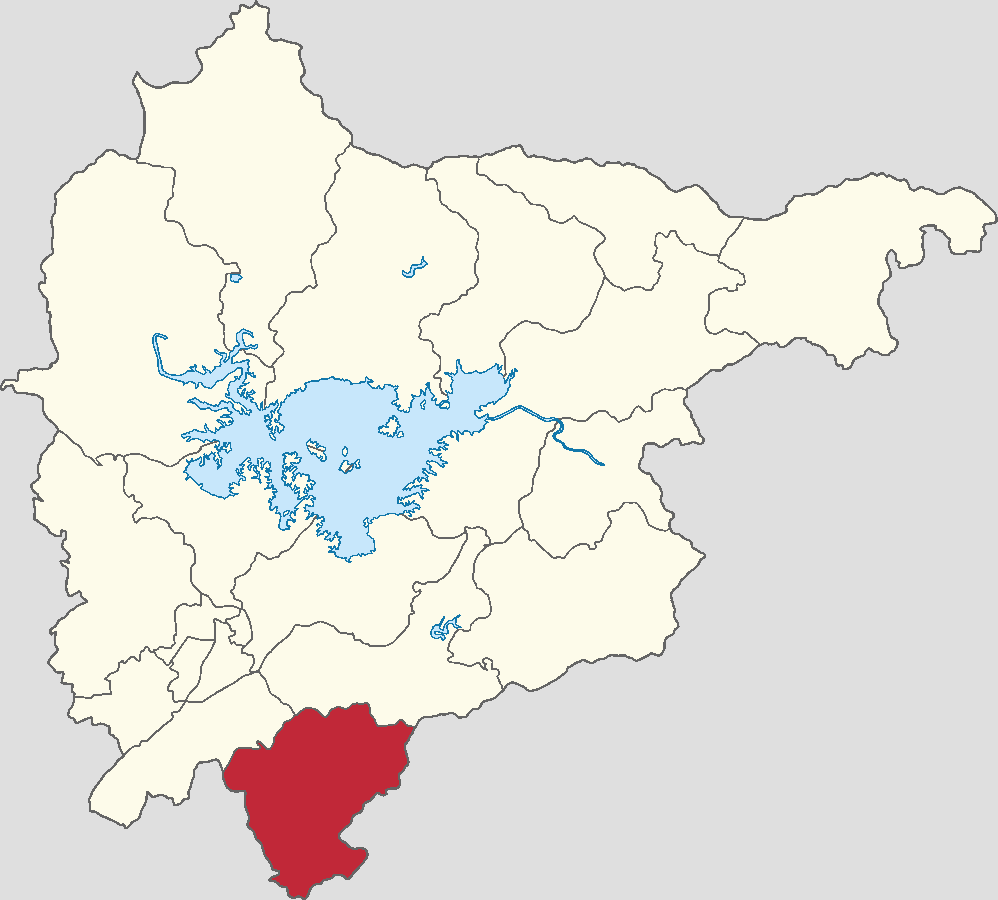
- Location of Dongshaoqu Town within Miyun District

- Location within Beijing Location within China
- Coordinates: 40°17′33″N 116°57′43″E
- Country: China
- Municipality: Beijing
- District: Miyun
- Village-level Divisions: 2 communities 14 villages

Area
  - Total: 109.4 km^{2} (42.2 sq mi)
- Elevation: 104 m (341 ft)

Population (2020)
  - Total: 9,495
  - Density: 86.79/km^{2} (224.8/sq mi)
- Time zone: UTC+8 (China Standard)
- Postal code: 101501
- Area code: 010

Dongshaoqu Town (simplified Chinese: 东邵渠镇; traditional Chinese: 東邵渠鎮; pinyin: Dōngshàoqú Zhèn) is a town located in the Miyun District of Beijing, China. It is located within a valley, and surrounded by mountains in all four directions. The town borders Jugezhuang Town to the north, Dahuashan and Liujiadian Towns to the east, Yukou and Longwantun Towns to the south, as well as Mulin and Henanzhai Towns to the west. There are 9,495 inhabitants under its administration as of 2020.

== History ==
Timetable of Dongshaoqu Town
Year	Status	Under
1914 - 1928	4th District	Huairou County, Capital Area
1928 - 1947	4th District	Huairou County, Hebei
1947 - 1950	8th District	Shunyi County, Hebei
1950 - 1953	3rd District	Miyun County, Hebei
1953 - 1956	Shi'e Township Xishaoqu Township Gaogezhuang Township Donghuluyu Township Yinyeling Township Laoyemiao Township	Miyun County, Hebei
1956 - 1958	Shi'e Township Xishaoqu Township	Miyun County, Hebei
1958 - 1961	Administered by Weixing People's Commune	Miyun County, Beijing
1961 - 1984	Dongshaoqu People's Commune	Miyun County, Beijing
1984 - 2001	Dongshaoqu Township	Miyun County, Beijing
2001 - 2015	Dongshaoqu Town	Miyun County, Beijing
2015–present	Dongshaoqu Town	Miyun District, Beijing

== Administrative divisions ==
Below is a list of the16 subdivisions, more specifically 2 communities and 14 villages, that constituted Dongshaoqu Town in 2021:

Subdivision names	Name transliterations	Type
东升	Dongsheng	Community
东进	Dongjin	Community
太保庄	Taibaozhuang	Village
高各庄	Gaogezhuang	Village
东邵渠	Dongshaoqu	Village
石峨	Shi'e	Village
界牌	Jiepai	Village
史长峪	Shichangyu	Village
大石门	Dashimen	Village
西邵渠	Xishaoqu	Village
东葫芦峪	Dong Huluyu	Village
西葫芦峪	Xi Huluyu	Village
大岭	Daling	Village
小岭	Xiaoling	Village
银冶岭	Yinyeling	Village
南达峪	Nandayu	Village

== Transportation ==
Misan Road passes through the eastern portion of the town.

== Gallery ==
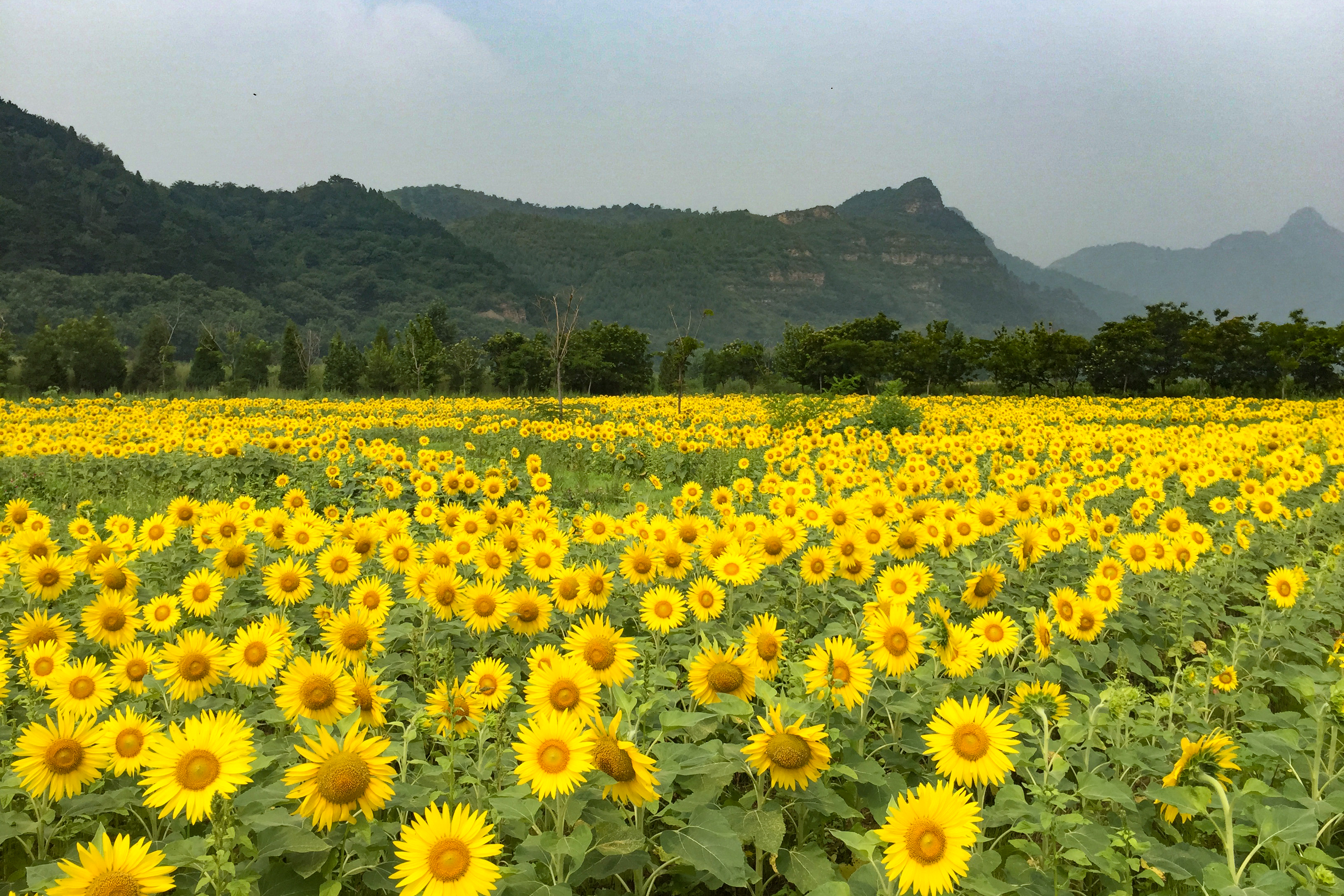
Sunflower fields at the south of Shi'e Village, 2015

== See also ==
- List of township-level divisions of Beijing
