= Miyun Reservoir =

Artificial lake in Miyun, Beijing, China

- 密云水库
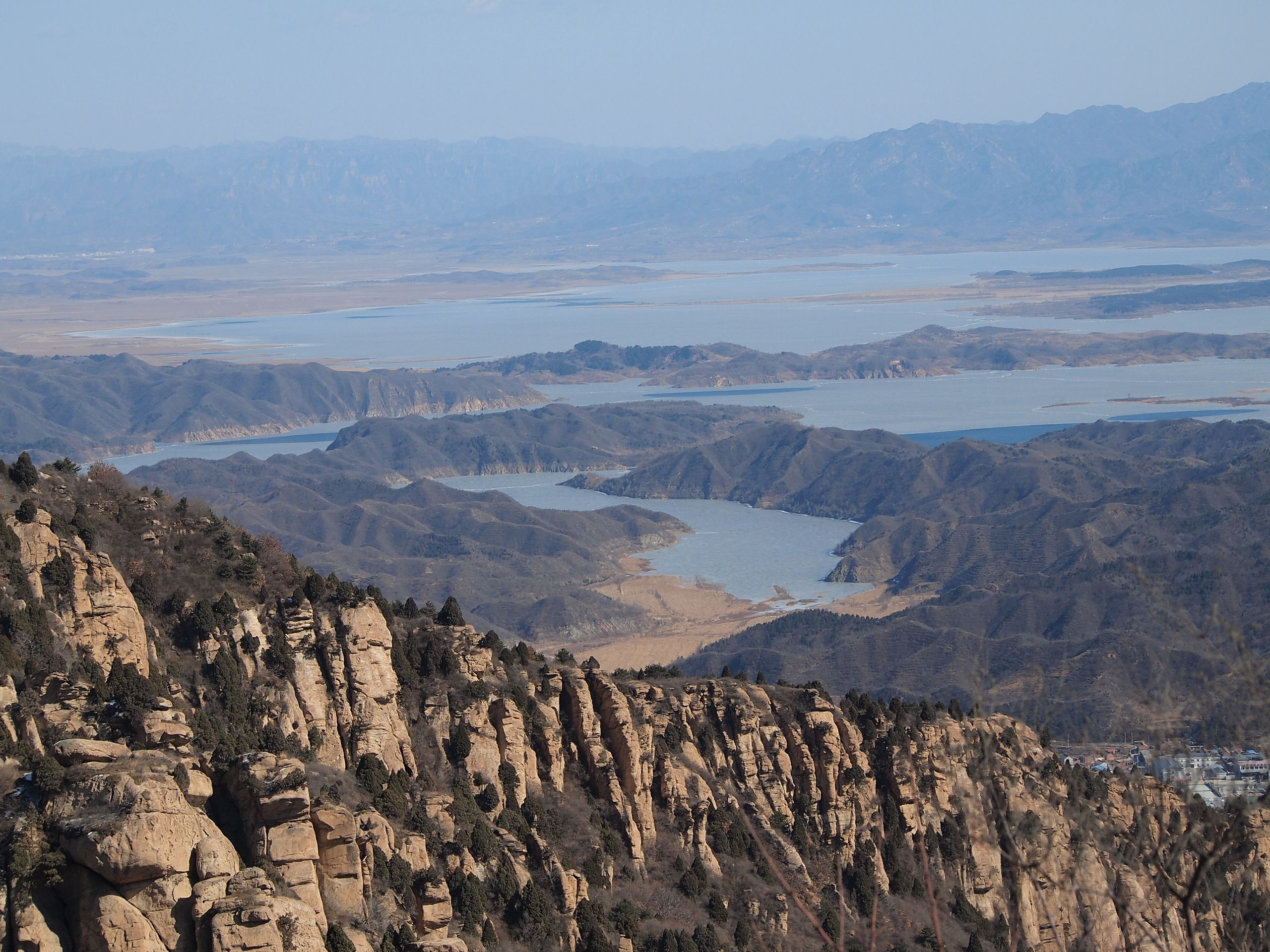

- Location within Beijing
- Location: Miyun District, Beijing
- Coordinates: 40°29′N 116°59′E
- Type: reservoir
- Basin countries: China
- Built: September 1, 1960

The Miyun Reservoir (Chinese: 密云水库; pinyin: Mìyún Shuǐkù) is a large-scale reservoir in Miyun District, Beijing, China, straddling the Chao River (潮河) and Bai River (白河). There are two major rivers flowing into the reservoir, namely the Bai River and the Chao River. The reservoir was formally completed on September 1, 1960.

The Miyun Reservoir is the largest comprehensive water conservancy project in North China. The reservoir covers an area of 180 square kilometers, with a reservoir capacity of 4 billion cubic meters and an average depth of 30 meters, making it the largest and only source of drinking-water supply for Beijing, serving over 11 million people.

The Miyun Reservoir is the largest artificial lake in Asia and is billed as the "Pearl in North China" (华北明珠).

== History ==
Initially, the Miyun Reservoir construction was contemplated for the Third Five-Year Plan period (1963-1967). Rapid industrialization and urbanization during the First Five-Year Plan period and the growth of irrigation projects increased water needs near Beijing and Tianjin, prompting the reservoir to be built years earlier than previously anticipated.

Construction of the Miyun Reservoir began in late 1958. It was completed in September 1960. The chief designer of the project was Zhang Guangdou and it was designed by the Department of Water Resources of Tsinghua University. Consistent with other Great Leap Forward projects, mass mobilized labor was an important factor in its construction. A large number of workers came from Beijing, Tianjin and Hebei, and the Engineering Bureau of the Ministry of Water Resources and Electric Power. Its proximity to Beijing and Tianjin also allowed it to draw on specialized labor, engineering experience, and equipment.

== Surrounding environment ==
Along the Miyun Reservoir, there is a 110-kilometer-long Huanku Road (环库公路).
