= Shicheng, Beijing =

Shicheng Town 石城镇
- Town
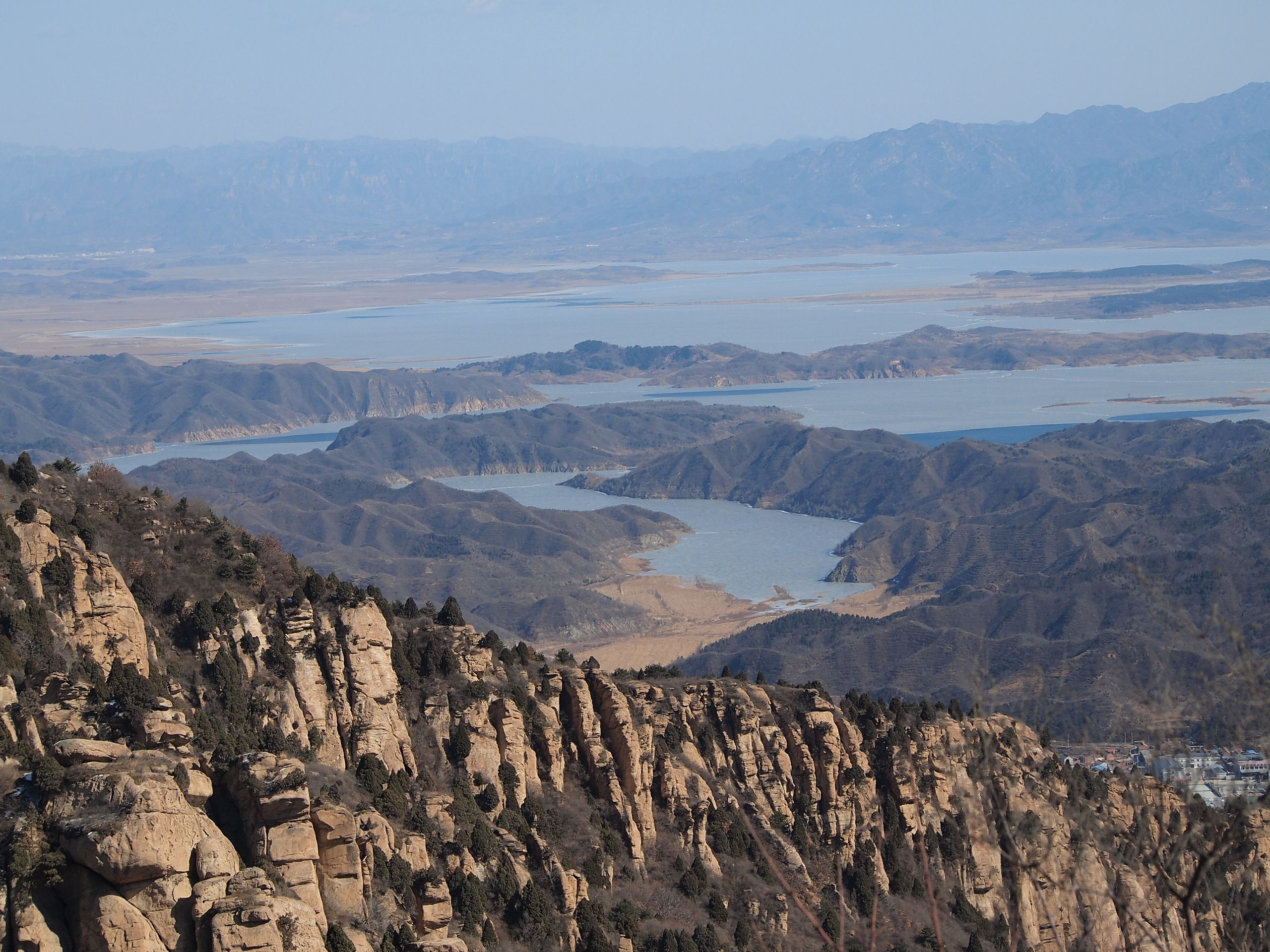
- View of Miyun Reservoir from the town, 2012

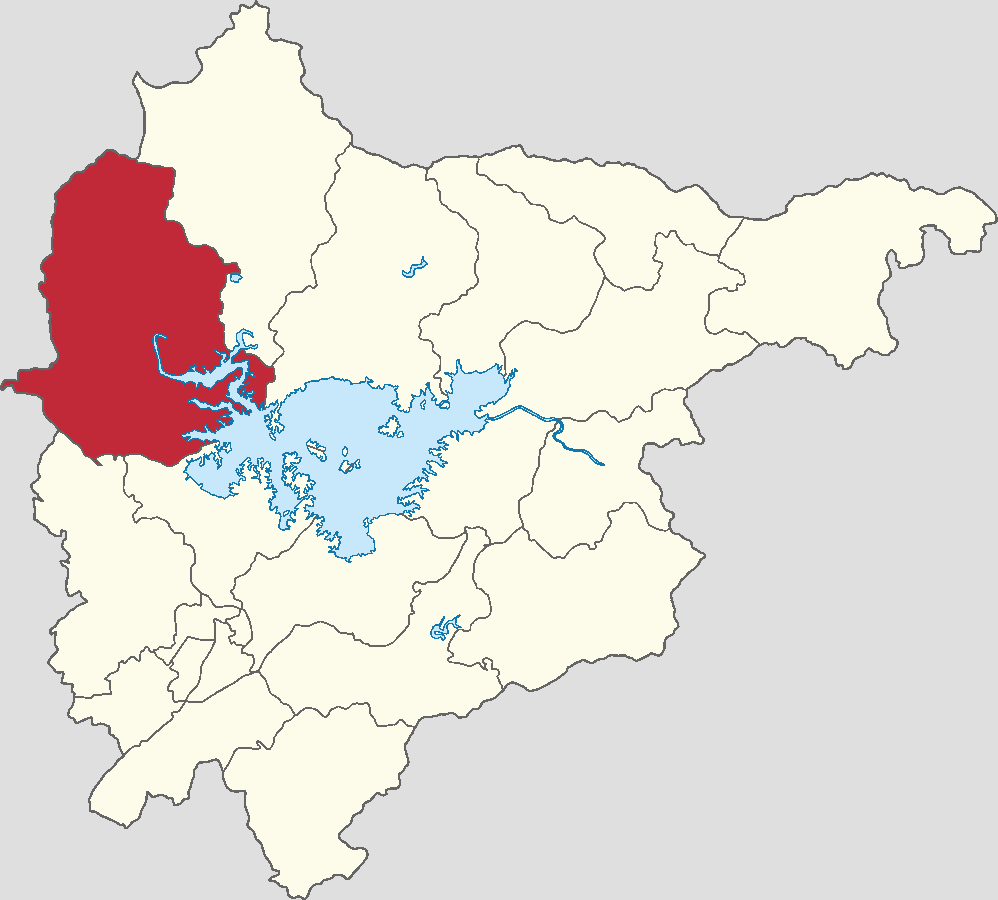
- Location of Shicheng Town in Miyun District

- Location within Beijing Location within China
- Coordinates: 40°32′22″N 116°48′54″E
- Country: China
- Municipality: Beijing
- District: Miyun
- Village-level Divisions: 1 community 15 villages

Area
  - Total: 259.2 km^{2} (100.1 sq mi)
- Elevation: 206 m (676 ft)

Population (2020)
  - Total: 4,014
  - Density: 15.49/km^{2} (40.11/sq mi)
- Time zone: UTC+8 (China Standard)
- Postal code: 101506
- Area code: 010

Shicheng Town (simplified Chinese: 石城镇; traditional Chinese: 石城鎮; pinyin: Shíchéng Zhèn) is a town located in the Miyun District of Beijing, China. It shares border with Changshaoying Manchu Ethnic Township and Fengjiayu Town to its north, Bulaotun and Xiwengzhuang Towns to its east, Xitiangezhuang and Huaibei Towns to its south, as well as Liulimiao and Tanghekou Towns to its west. As of 2020, its population was 4,014.

The town was named after Shicheng Village, which hosts the town's government. Its name literally means "Stone City".

== Geography ==
Shicheng Town is bounded by Mount Yunmeng to the west and Miyun Reservoir to the east. Several waterways like Bai and Duijia Rivers flows eastward through the town.

In terms of transportation, Shicheng Town is connected to the Miguan and Liuxin Roads.

== History ==
Timeline of Shicheng's History
Year	Status	Within
1947 - 1949	1st District	Yihua County, Peiping
1949 - 1950	1st District	Miyun County, Hebei
1950 - 1953	4th District	Miyun County, Hebei
1953 - 1956	Shitanglu Township; Zhangjiafen Township; Lianhuaban Township; Huangyukou Township; Yingchengling Township; Wangzhuang Township; Ganhechang Township	Miyun County, Hebei
1956 - 1958	Xiwanzi Township; Zhangjiafen Township; Wangzhuang Township; Lenfengdianzi Township; Ganhechang Township	Miyun County, Hebei
1958 - 1960	Quanfeng People's Commune	Miyun County, Beijing
1960 - 1961	Fenjiayu People's Commune	Miyun County, Beijing
1961 - 1983	Shicheng People's Commune	Miyun County, Beijing
1983 - 2001	Shicheng Township	Miyun County, Beijing
2001 - 2015	Shicheng Town	Miyun County, Beijing
2015–present	Shicheng Town	Miyun District, Beijing

== Administrative divisions ==
In 2021, Shicheng Town was composed of 16 subdivisions, consisting of 1 community and 15 villages. They are listed as follows:

Subdivision names	Name transliterations	Type
石城镇	Shichengzhen	Community
梨树沟	Lishugou	Village
水堡子	Shuipuzi	Village
王庄	Wangzhuang	Village
石城	Shicheng	Village
石塘路	Shitanglu	Village
河北	Hebei	Village
西湾子	Xiwanzi	Village
黄峪口	Huangyukou	Village
捧河岩	Pengheyan	Village
张家坟	Zhangjiafen	Village
二平台	Erpingtai	Village
贾峪	Jiayu	Village
四合堂	Sihetang	Village
红星	Hongxing	Village
黄土梁	Huangtuliang	Village

== Gallery ==
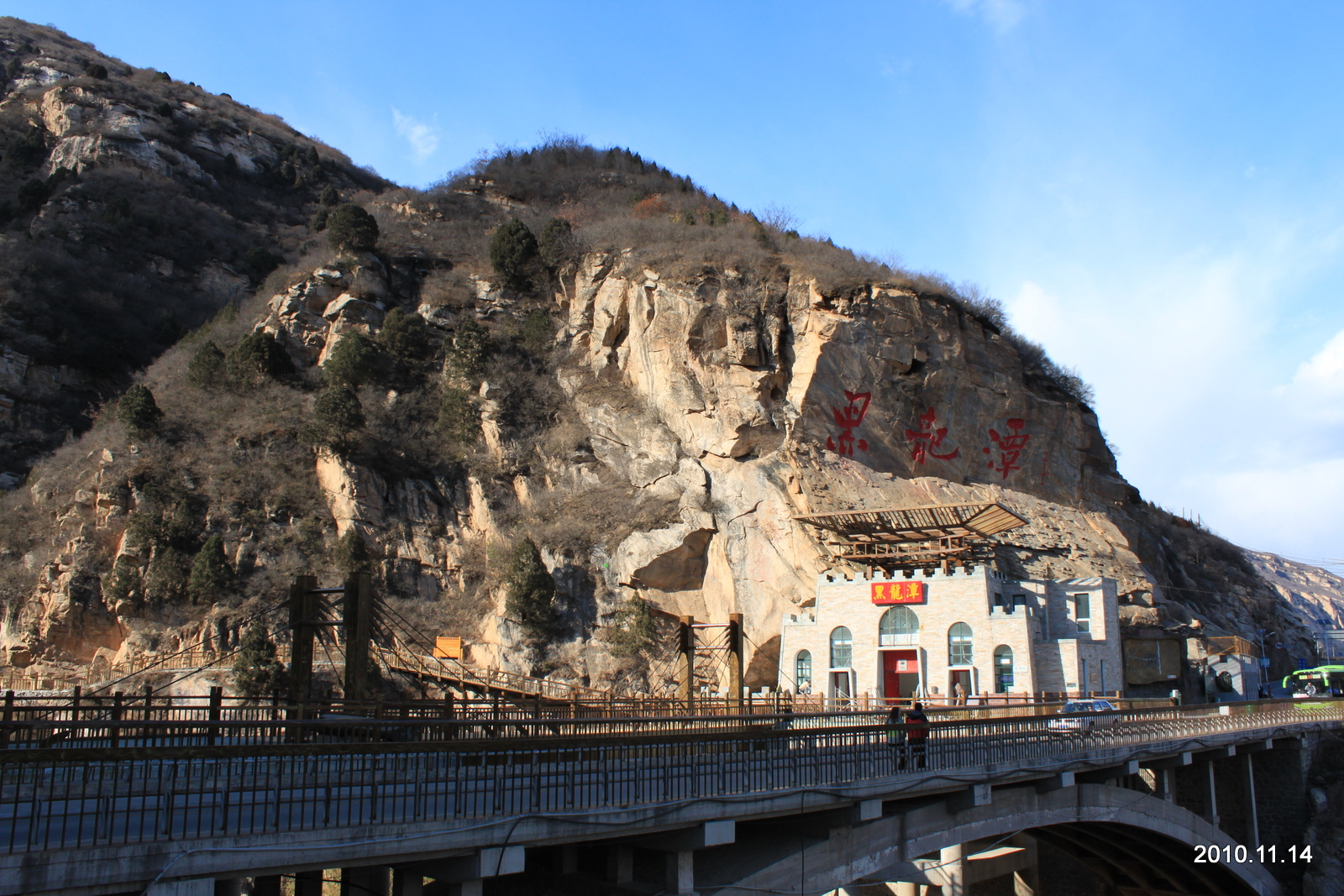
Black Dragon Pool, 2010

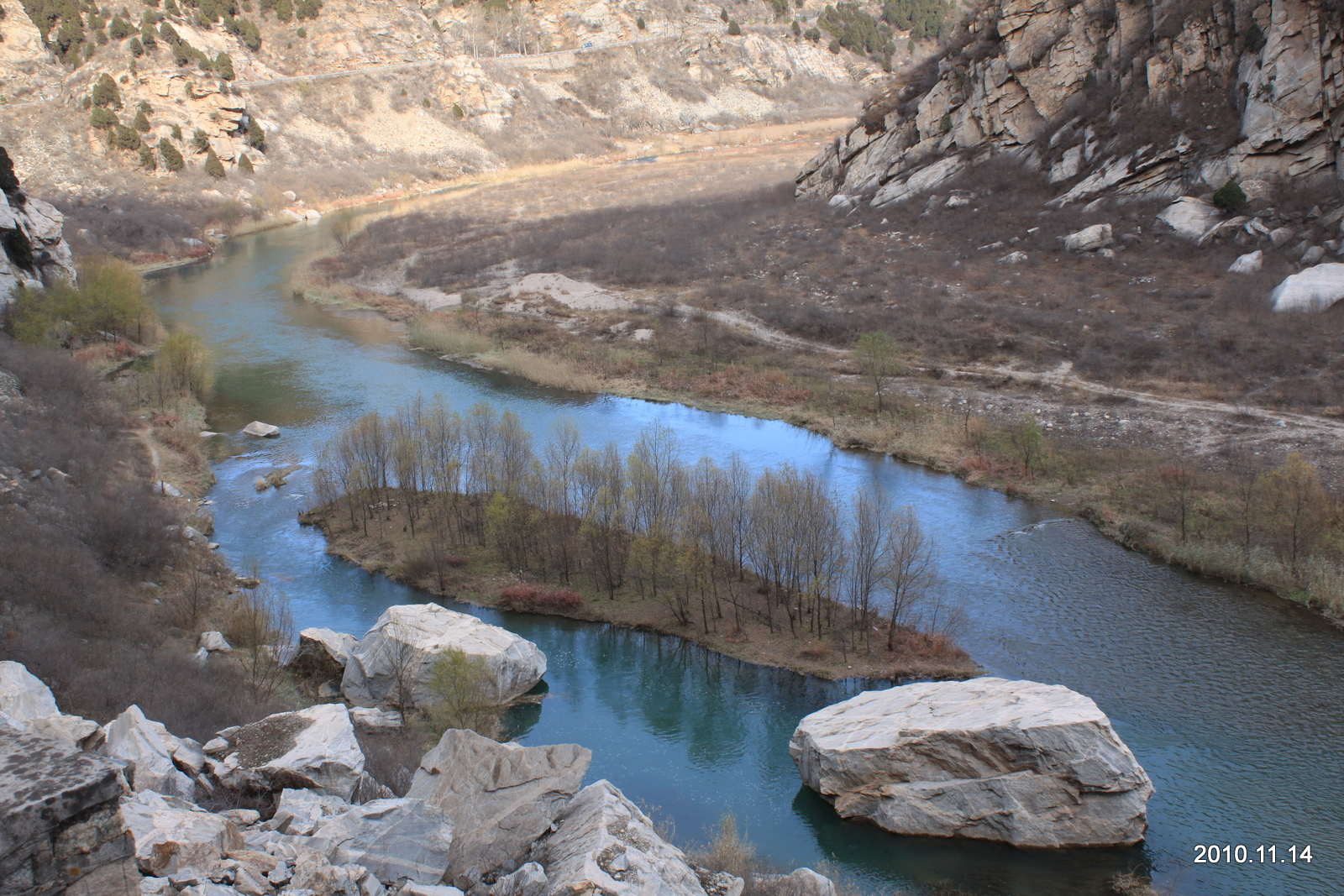
Bai River Valley north of the town, 2010

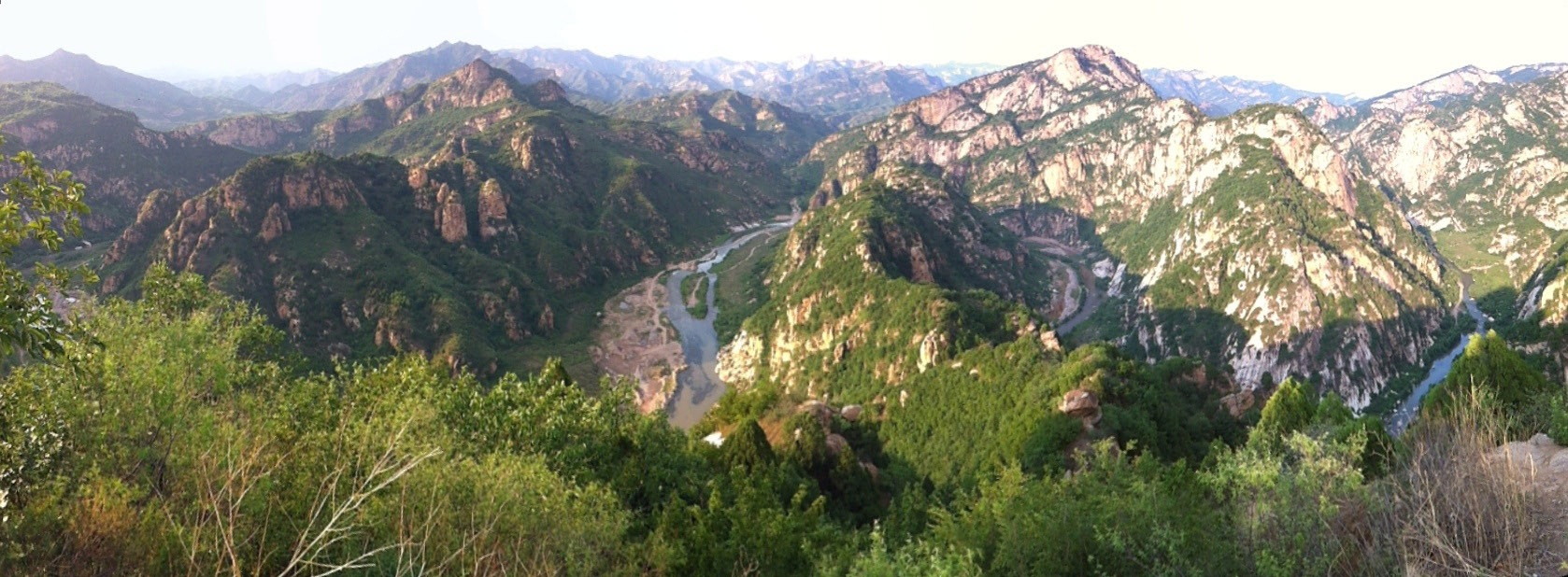
Aerial view of Bai River Valley, 2011

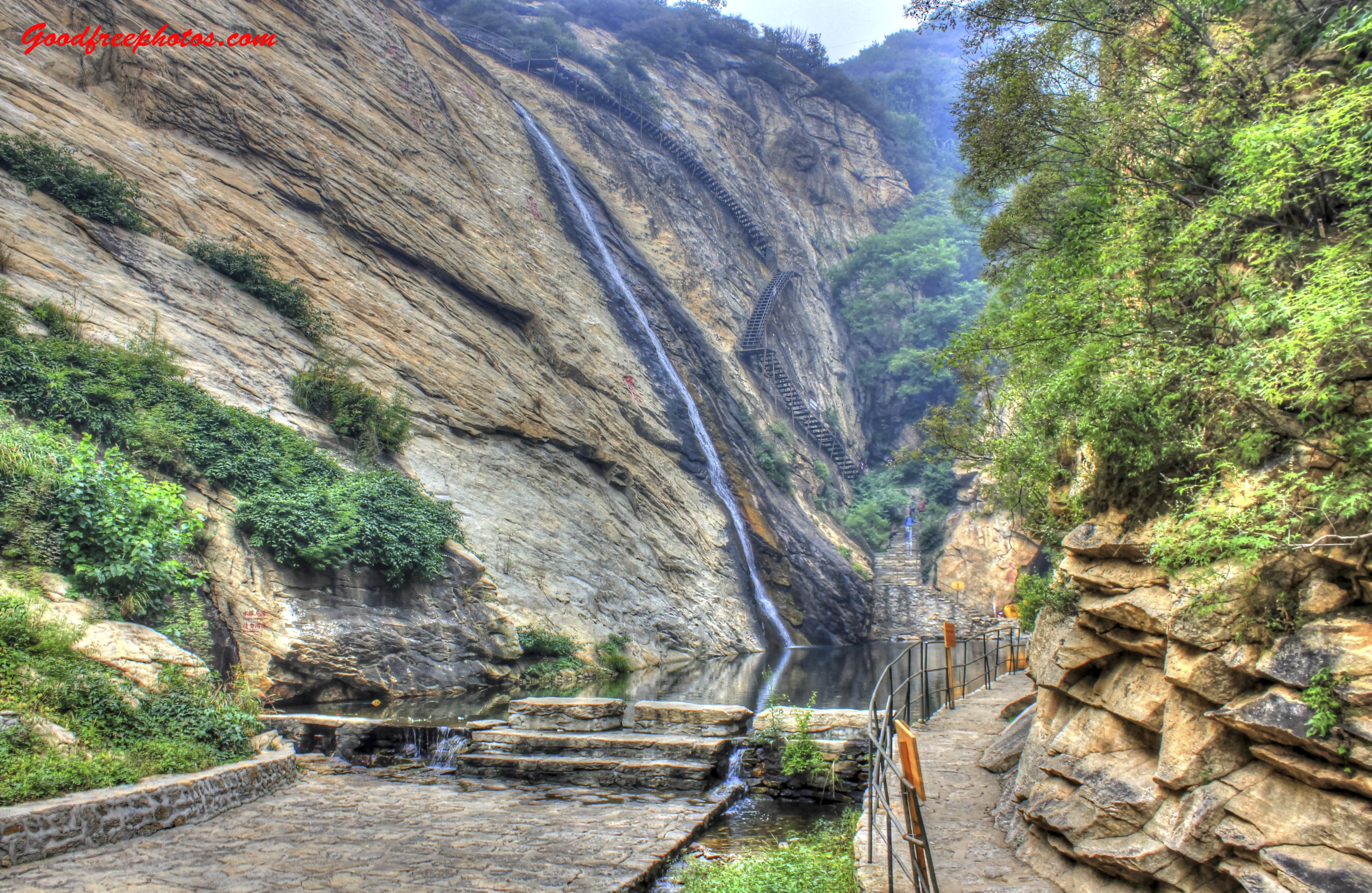
Waterfall at Immortals Valley, 2013

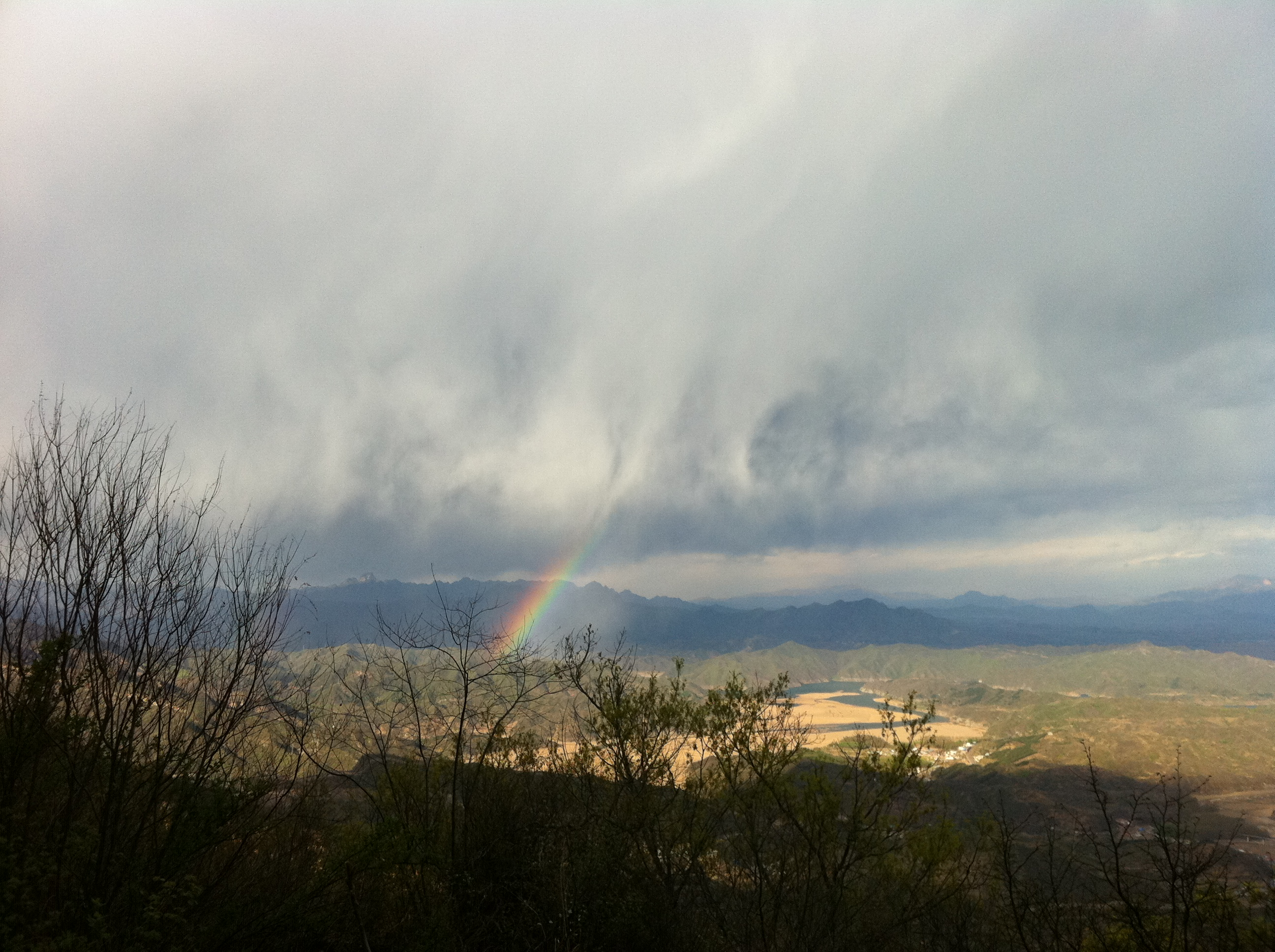
Taoyuan Xiangu (Taoyuan Fairy Valley) scenic area inside Shicheng town, 2011

== See also ==
- List of township-level divisions of Beijing
