= Liulimiao =

Liulimiao Town 琉璃庙镇
- Town
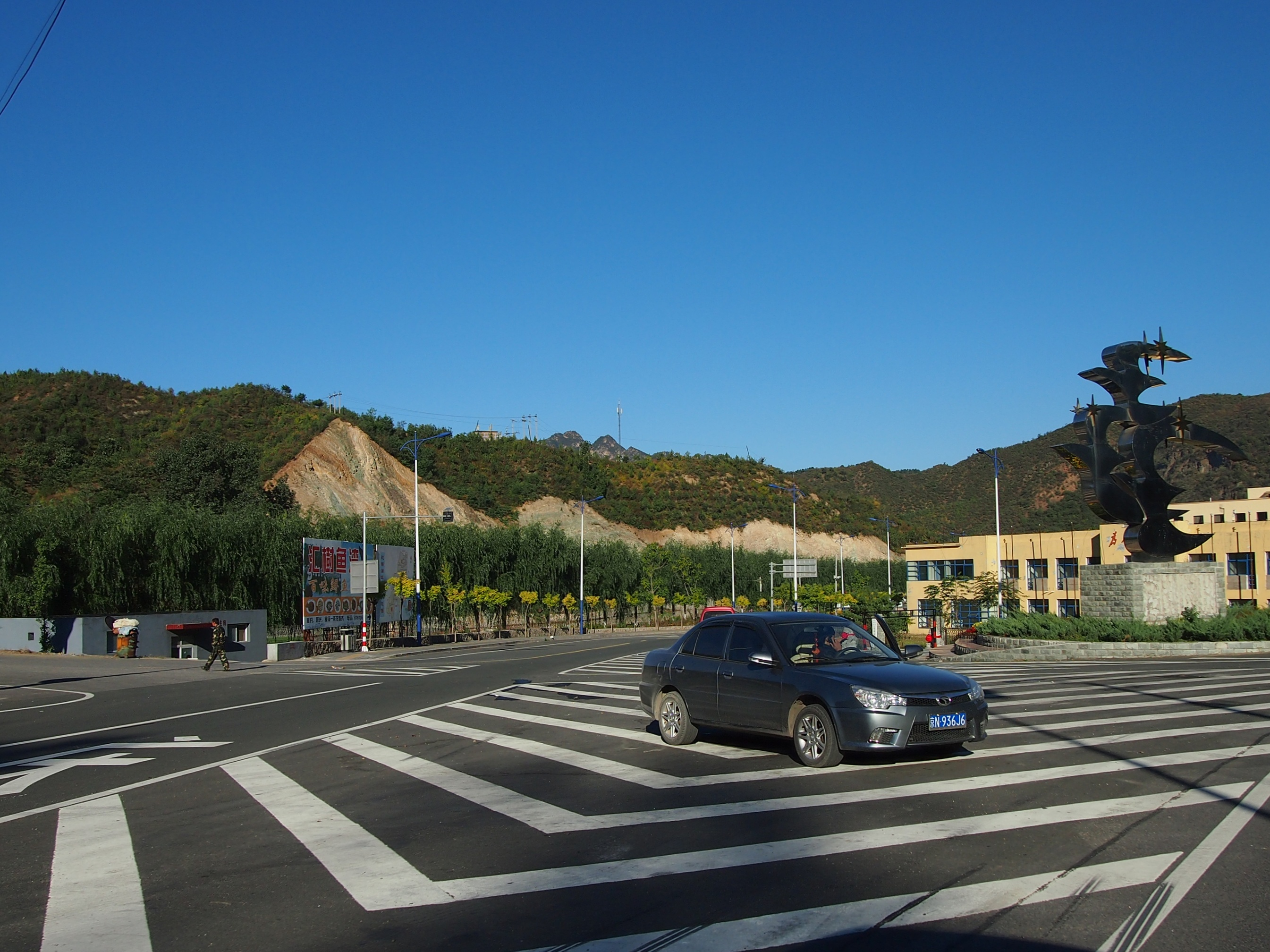
- Jingjia Road within Liulimiao Town, 2012

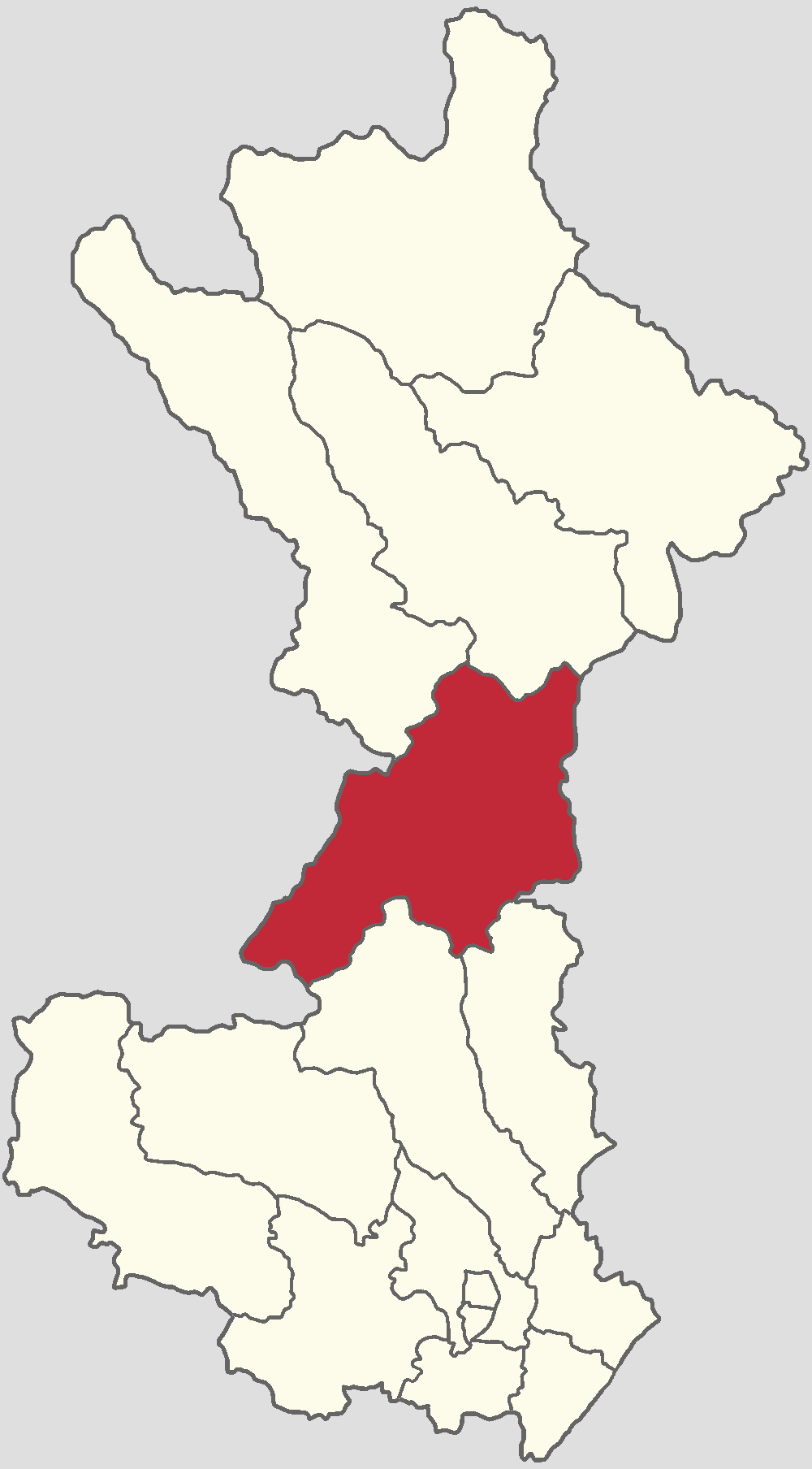
- Location in Huairou District

- Location within Beijing Location within China
- Coordinates: 40°37′34″N 116°38′42″E
- Country: China
- Municipality: Beijing
- District: Huairou
- Village-level Divisions: 25 villages

Area
  - Total: 226.5 km^{2} (87.5 sq mi)
- Elevation: 296 m (971 ft)

Population (2020)
  - Total: 4,312
  - Density: 19.04/km^{2} (49.31/sq mi)
- Time zone: UTC+8 (China Standard)
- Postal code: 101409
- Area code: 010

Liulimiao Town (simplified Chinese: 琉璃庙镇; traditional Chinese: 琉璃廟鎮; pinyin: Liúlímiào Zhèn) is a town located in the center of Huairou District, Beijing. It is located at the foot of Yunmeng Mountain of the Yan Mountains. It borders Baoshan and Tanghekou Towns to the north, Shicheng Town to the east, Yanqi and Huaibei Towns to the south, as well as Sihai Town and Zhenzhuquan Township to the west. The population for this town was 4,312 as of 2020.

== History ==
Timeline of Liulimiao's History
Year	Status	Part of
1947 – 1951		Sihai County, Rehe
1951 – 1953	5th District	Huairou County, Hebei
1953 – 1956	Anzhouba Township; Shuangwenpu Township; Baichazi Township; Laogongying Township	Huairou County, Hebei
1956 – 1958	Baichazi Township; Anzhouba Township	Huairou County, Hebei
1958 – 1959	Gangtie People's Commune	Huairou County, Beijing
1959 -1960	Liulimiao People's Commune	Huairou County, Beijing
1960 – 1961	Qingshiling People's Commune	Huairou County, Beijing
1961 – 1983	Liulimiao People's Commune	Huairou County, Beijing
1983 – 1998	Liulimiao Township	Huairou County, Beijing
1998 – 2001	Liulimiao Town	Huairou County, Beijing
2001–present	Liulimiao Town	Huairou District, Beijing

== Administrative divisions ==
In the year 2021, Liulimiao Town was subdivided into 25 villages:

Subdivision names	Name transliterations
后山铺	Houshanpu
东峪	Dongyu
龙泉峪	Longquanyu
柏查子	Baichazi
琉璃庙	Liulimiao
得田沟	Detiangou
碾子湾	Nianziwan
老公营	Laogongying
安洲坝	Anzhouba
西湾子	Xiwanzi
前安岭	Qian'anling
双文铺	Shuangwnepu
青石岭	Qingshiling
白河北	Baihebei
狼虎哨	Langehushao
西台子	Xitaizi
崎峰茶	Qifengcha
孙胡沟	Sunhugou
长岭沟门	Changlinggoumen
鱼水洞	Yushuidong
河北	Hebei
八亩地	Bamudi
二台子	Ertaizi
杨树下	Yangshuxia
梁根	Lianggen

== Gallery ==
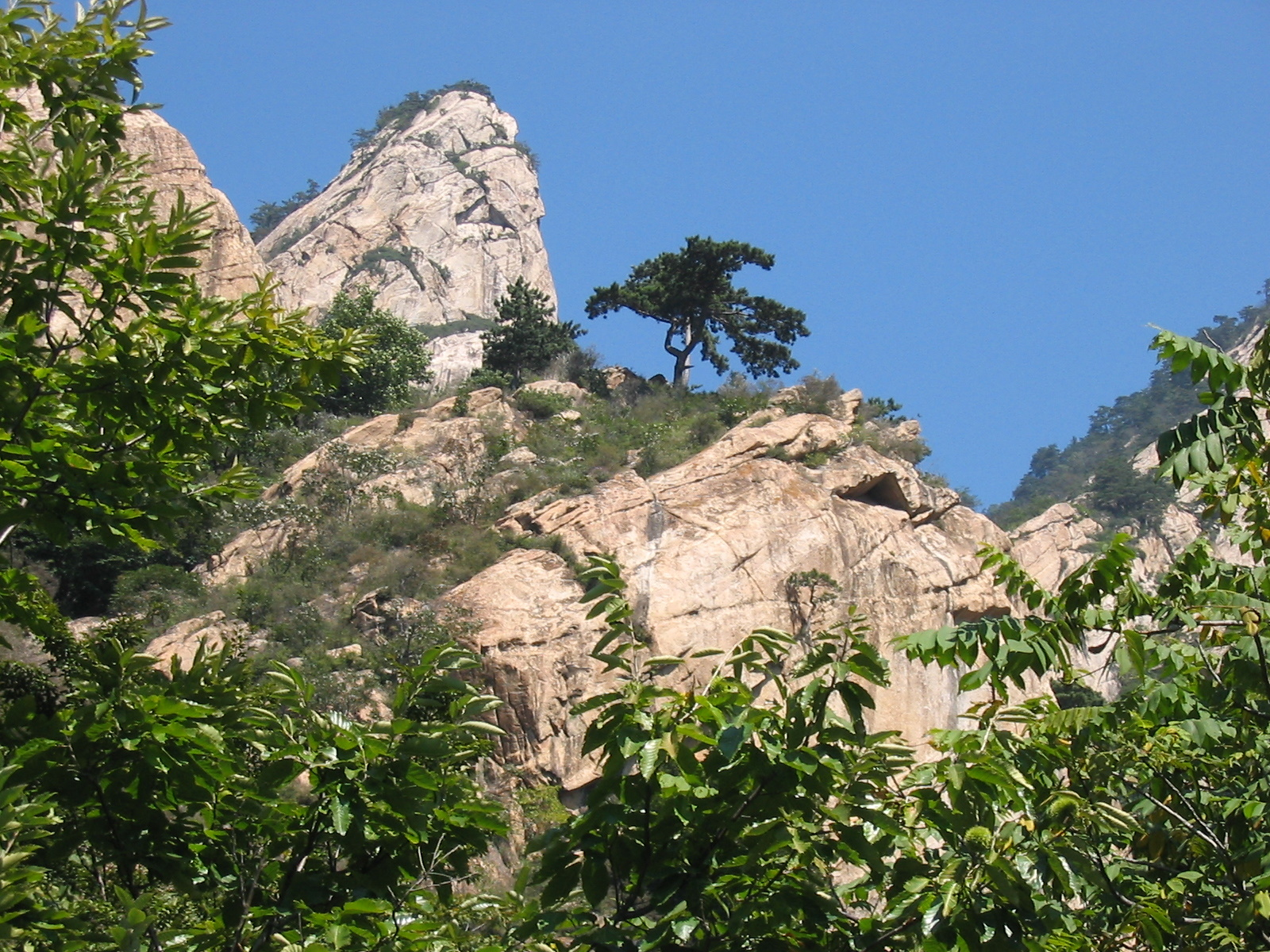
Yunmeng Mountain, 2003

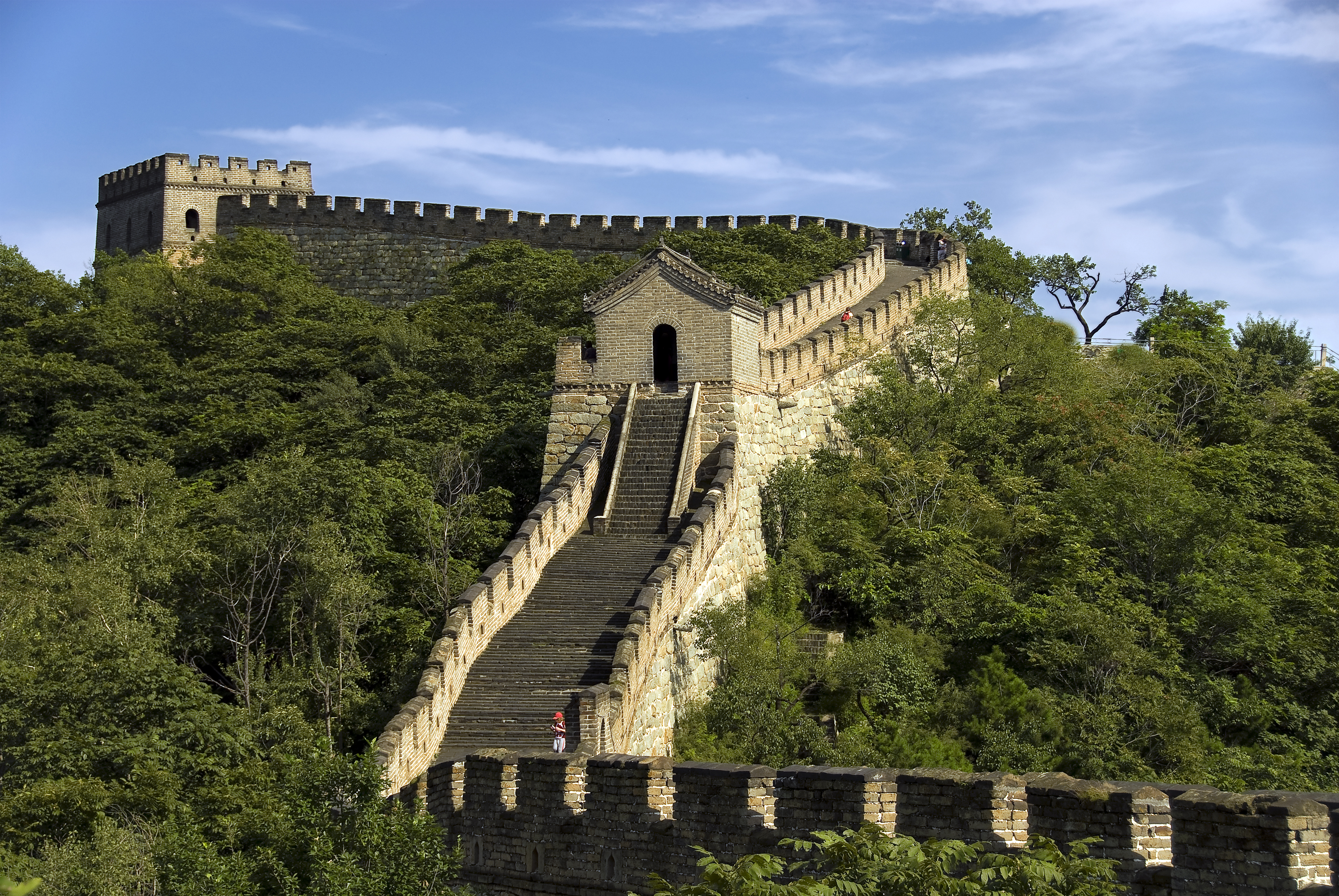
Portion of the Great Wall near Xitaizi Village, 2008

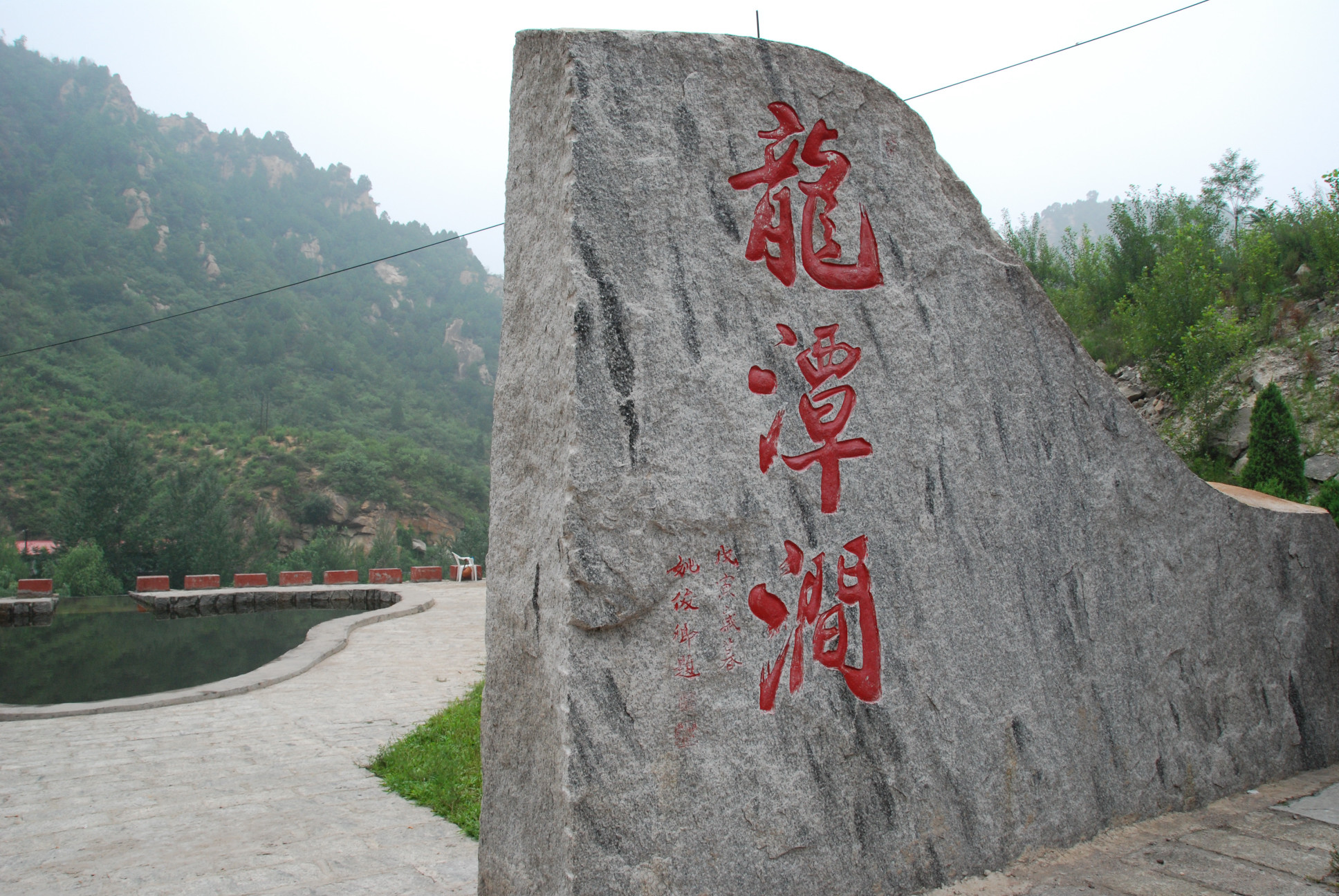
Entrance to Longtan Lake, 2009

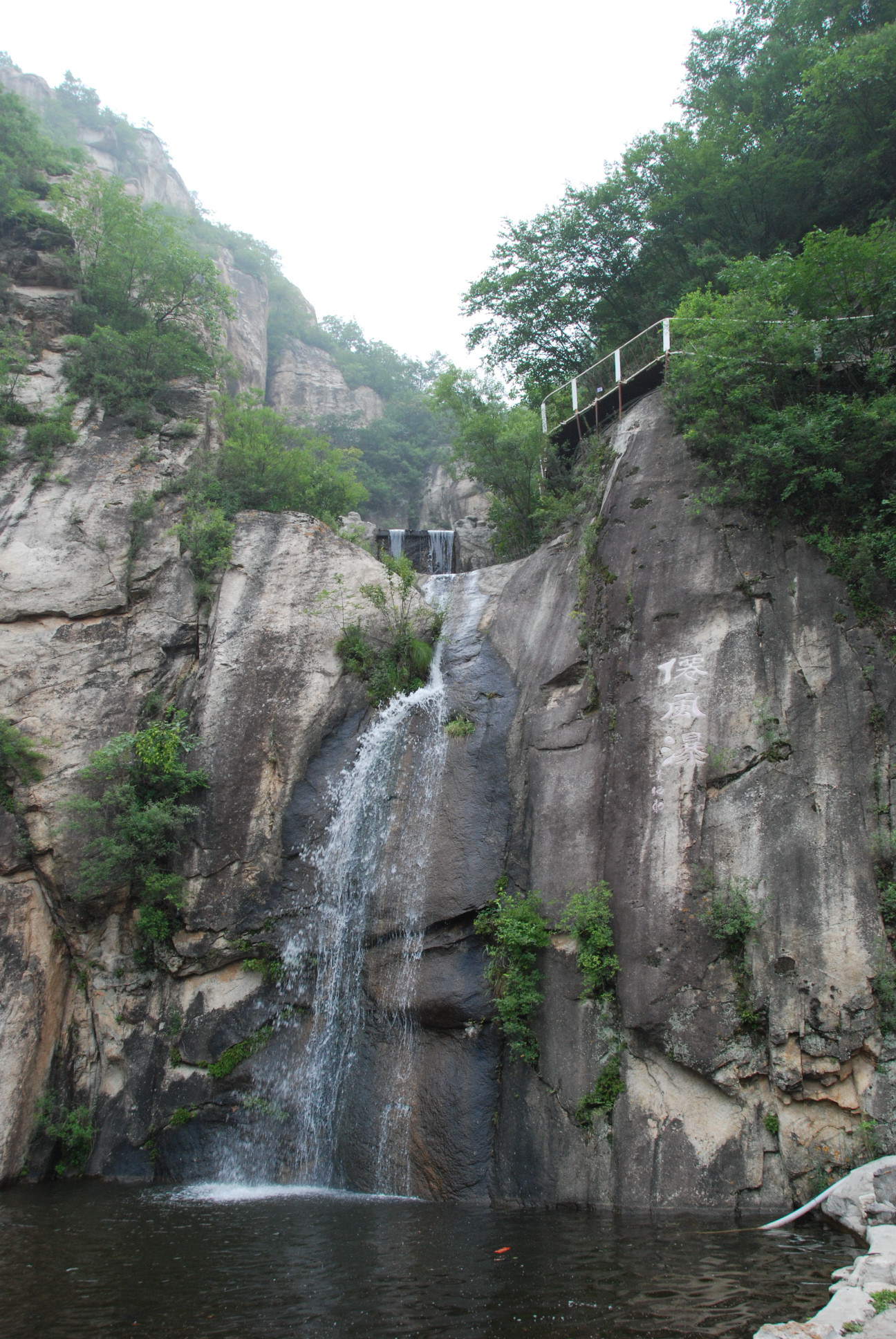
Waterfall within Yunmeng Natural Beauty Spot, 2009
