= Xitiangezhuang =

Xitiangezhuang Town 西田各庄镇
- Town
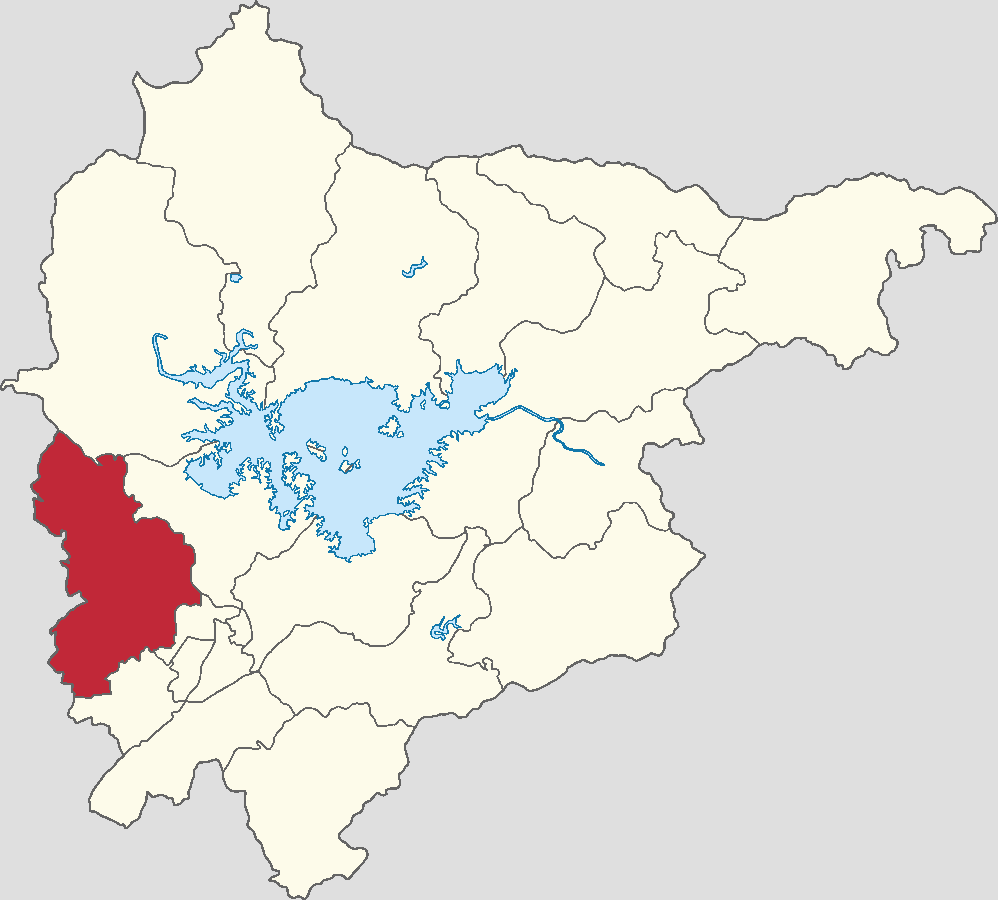
- Location within Miyun District

- Location within Beijing Location within China
- Coordinates: 40°23′59″N 116°45′54″E
- Country: China
- Municipality: Beijing
- District: Miyun
- Village-level Divisions: 3 communities 34 villages

Area
  - Total: 125.6 km^{2} (48.5 sq mi)
- Elevation: 60 m (200 ft)

Population (2020)
  - Total: 33,702
  - Density: 268.3/km^{2} (695.0/sq mi)
- Time zone: UTC+8 (China Standard)
- Postal code: 101511
- Area code: 010

Xitiangezhuang Town (simplified Chinese: 西田各庄镇; traditional Chinese: 西田各莊鎮; pinyin: Xītiángèzhuāng zhèn) is a town located in the Miyun District of Beijing, China. It lies on the north of Bai River's alluvial plain. The town borders Shicheng Town in the north, Xiwengzhuang and Miyun Towns in the east, Shilipu Town in the south, as well as Beifang and Huaibei Towns in the west. It had a total population of 33,702 as of 2020.

The name Xitiangezhuang (Chinese: 西田各庄; lit. 'West Tian Family Villa') comes from Xitiangezhuang Village, the place where the town's government is seated.

== History ==
Timeline of Xitiangezhuang's History
Year	Status	Within
1947 - 1949	Xitiangezhuang Town, part of the 7th District	Yihua County, Peiping
1949 - 1950	Xitiangezhuang Town, part of the 7th District	Miyun County, Hebei
1950 - 1953	Xitiangezhuang Town, part of the 2nd District	Miyun County, Hebei
1953 - 1956	Cangtou Township Taiziwu Township Daxinzhuang Township	Miyun County, Hebei
1956 - 1958	Xitiangezhuang People's Commune	Miyun County, Hebei
1958 - 1983	Xitiangezhuang People's Commune	Miyun County, Beijing
1983 - 1993	Xitiangezhuang Township	Miyun County, Beijing
1993 - 2015	Xitiangezhuang Town	Miyun County, Beijing
2015–present	Xitiangezhuang Town	Miyun District, Beijing

== Administrative divisions ==
At the time of writing, Xitiangezhuang Town comprised 38 subdivisions, with these 4 communities and 34 villages:

Administrative Division Codes	Subdivision names	Name transliterations	Type
110118102001	西田各庄社区	Xitiangezhuangsheqv	Community
110118102002	大辛庄社区	Daxinzhuangsheqv	Community
110118102003	沿村社区	Yancunsheqv	Community
110118102004	晨曦家园社区	Chenxijiayuansheqv	Community
110118102201	西田各庄村	Xitiangezhuangcun	Village
110118102202	董各庄村	Donggezhuangcun	Village
110118102203	仓头村	Cangtoucun	Village
110118102204	渤海寨村	Bohaizhaicun	Village
110118102205	水洼屯村	Shuiwatuncun	Village
110118102206	于家庄村	Yujiazhuangcun	Village
110118102207	疃里村	Tuanlicun	Village
110118102208	大屋村	Dawucun	Village
110118102209	大辛庄村	Daxinzhuangcun	Village
110118102210	西恒河村	Xihenghecun	Village
110118102211	小辛庄村	Xiaoxinzhuangcun	Village
110118102212	西田阳村	Xitianyangcun	Village
110118102213	政里村	Zhenglicun	Village
110118102214	杨雁村	Yangyancun	Village
110118102215	署地村	Shudicun	Village
110118102216	新王庄村	Xinwangzhuangcun	Village
110118102217	韩各庄村	Hangezhuangcun	Village
110118102218	卸甲山村	Xiejiashancun	Village
110118102219	马各庄村	Magezhuangcun	Village
110118102220	西户部庄村	Xihubuzhuangcun	Village
110118102221	大水良村	Dashuiliangcun	Village
110118102222	小水良村	Xiaoshuiliangcun	Village
110118102223	小东庄村	Xiaodongzhuangcun	Village
110118102224	牛盆峪村	Niupenyucun	Village
110118102225	横屏山村	Hengpingshancun	Village
110118102226	兴盛村	Xingshengcun	Village
110118102227	白道峪村	Baidaoyucun	Village
110118102228	小石尖村	Xiaoshijiancun	Village
110118102229	青甸村	Qingdiancun	Village
110118102230	黄坨子村	Huangtuozicun	Village
110118102231	坟庄村	Fenzhuangcun	Village
110118102232	龚庄子村	Gongzhuangzicun	Village
110118102233	河北庄村	Hebeizhuangcun	Village
110118102234	黑古岩村	Heiguyancun	Village

== See also ==
- List of township-level divisions of Beijing
