= Xiwengzhuang =

Xiwengzhuang Town 溪翁庄镇
- Town
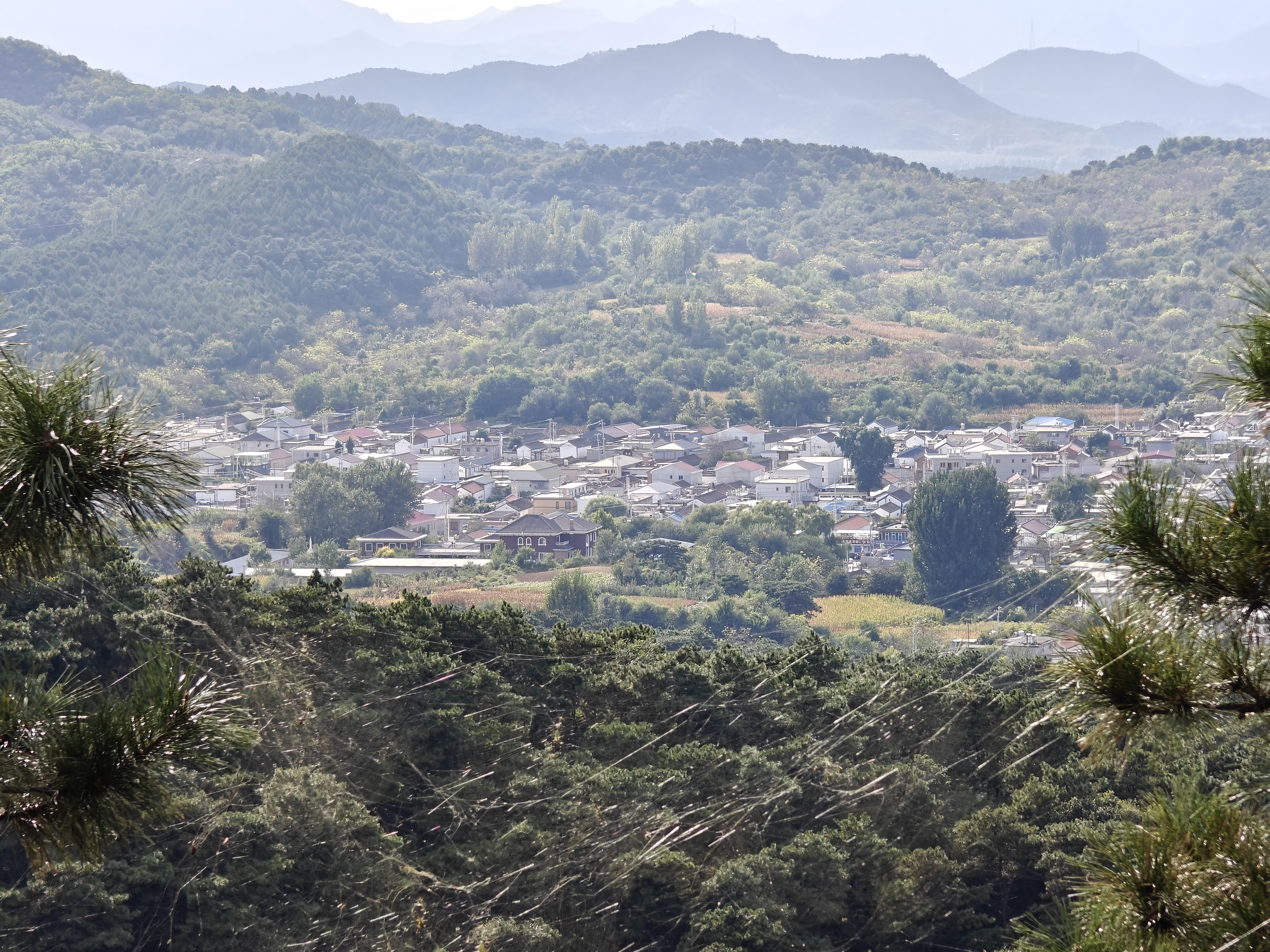
- Mountain villages near Miyun Reservoir Dam in the town, 2025

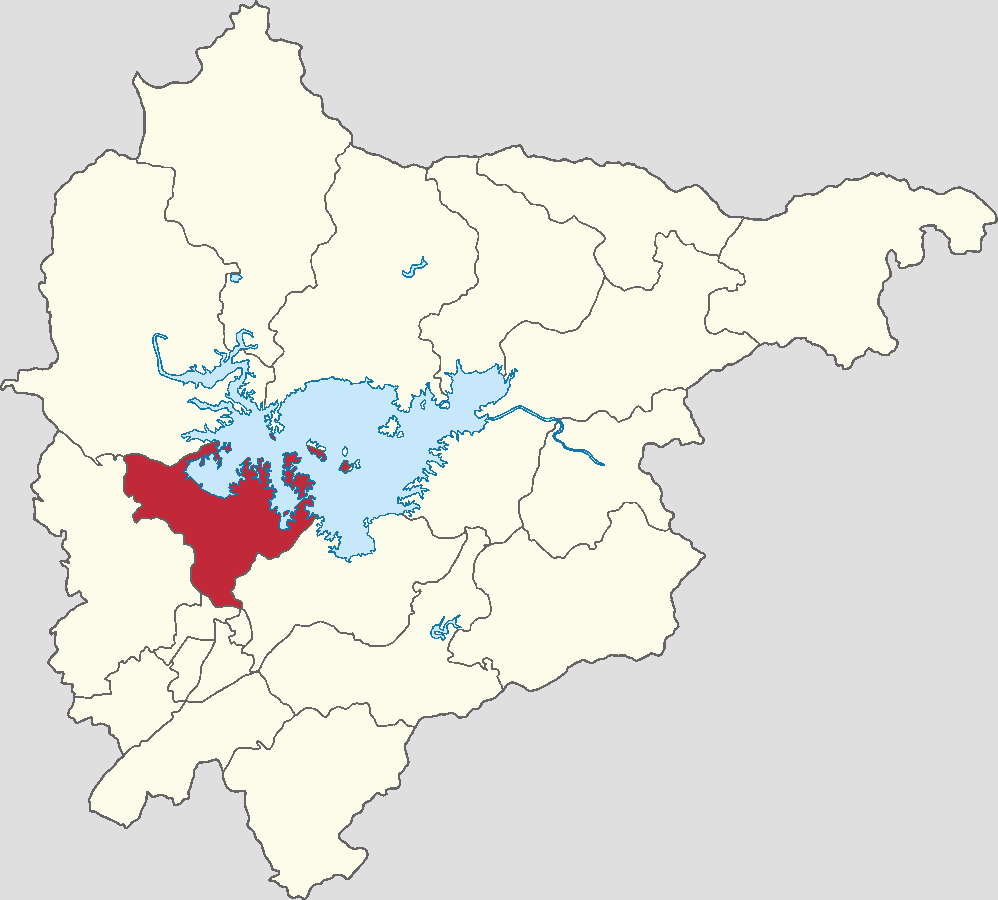
- Location in Miyun District

- Location within Beijing Location within China
- Coordinates: 40°28′16″N 116°50′14″E
- Country: China
- Municipality: Beijing
- District: Miyun
- Village-level Divisions: 8 communities 14 villages

Area
  - Total: 111.1 km^{2} (42.9 sq mi)
- Elevation: 116 m (381 ft)

Population (2020)
  - Total: 20,438
  - Density: 184.0/km^{2} (476.5/sq mi)
- Time zone: UTC+8 (China Standard)
- Postal code: 101512
- Area code: 010

Xiwengzhuang Town (simplified Chinese: 溪翁庄镇; traditional Chinese: 溪翁莊鎮; pinyin: Xīwēngzhuāng Zhèn) is a town located in the Miyun District of Beijing, China. Situated on the southwest of the Miyun Reservoir, it borders Shicheng and Bulaotun Towns to the north, Mujiayu Town to the east, Miyun Town to the south, and Xitiangezhuang Town to the west. In the year 2020, its population was 20,438.

This town got the name Xiwengzhuang (Chinese: 溪翁庄; lit. 'Creek Elder Villa') due to its government being located in Xiwengzhuang Village.

== History ==
Timeline of Xiwengzhuang Town
| Year | Status | Under |
|---|---|---|
| 1949 - 1958 | 6th District | Miyun County, Hebei |
| 1958 - 1961 | Administered by Dongfeng People's Commune | Miyun County, Beijing |
| 1961 - 1981 | Xiwengzhuang People's Commune | Miyun County, Beijing |
| 1981 - 1983 | Xiwengzhuang People's Commune Xiwengzhuang Town | Miyun County, Beijing |
| 1983 - 1986 | Xiwengzhuang Township Xiwengzhuang Town | Miyun County, Beijing |
| 1986 - 2015 | Xiwengzhuang Town | Miyun County, Beijing |
| 2015–present | Xiwengzhuang Town | Miyun District, Beijing |

== Administrative divisions ==
The table below lists all 22 subdivisions of Xiwengzhuang Town by the end of 2021, including 8 communities and 14 villages:

| Administrative Division Codes | Subdivision names | Name transliterations | Type |
|---|---|---|---|
| 110118101001 | 第一社区 | Diyisheqv | Community |
| 110118101002 | 第二社区 | Di'ersheqv | Community |
| 110118101003 | 第三社区 | Disansheqv | Community |
| 110118101004 | 第四社区 | Disisheqv | Community |
| 110118101005 | 第五社区 | Diwusheqv | Community |
| 110118101006 | 润溪社区 | Runxisheqv | Community |
| 110118101007 | 云溪社区 | Yunxisheqv | Community |
| 110118101008 | 澜茵山社区 | Lanyinshansheqv | Community |
| 110118101201 | 北白岩村 | Beibaiyancun | Village |
| 110118101202 | 溪翁庄村 | Xiwengzhuangcun | Village |
| 110118101203 | 金叵罗村 | Jinpoluocun | Village |
| 110118101204 | 石马峪村 | Shimayucun | Village |
| 110118101205 | 走马庄村 | Zoumazhuangcun | Village |
| 110118101206 | 尖岩村 | Jianyancun | Village |
| 110118101207 | 东智东村 | Dongzhidongcun | Village |
| 110118101208 | 东智西村 | Dongzhixicun | Village |
| 110118101209 | 东智北村 | Dongzhibeicun | Village |
| 110118101210 | 石墙沟村 | Shiqianggoucun | Village |
| 110118101211 | 黑山寺村 | Heishansicun | Village |
| 110118101212 | 立新庄村 | Lixinzhuangcun | Village |
| 110118101213 | 白草洼村 | Baicaowacun | Village |
| 110118101214 | 东营子村 | Dongyingzicun | Village |

== Gallery ==
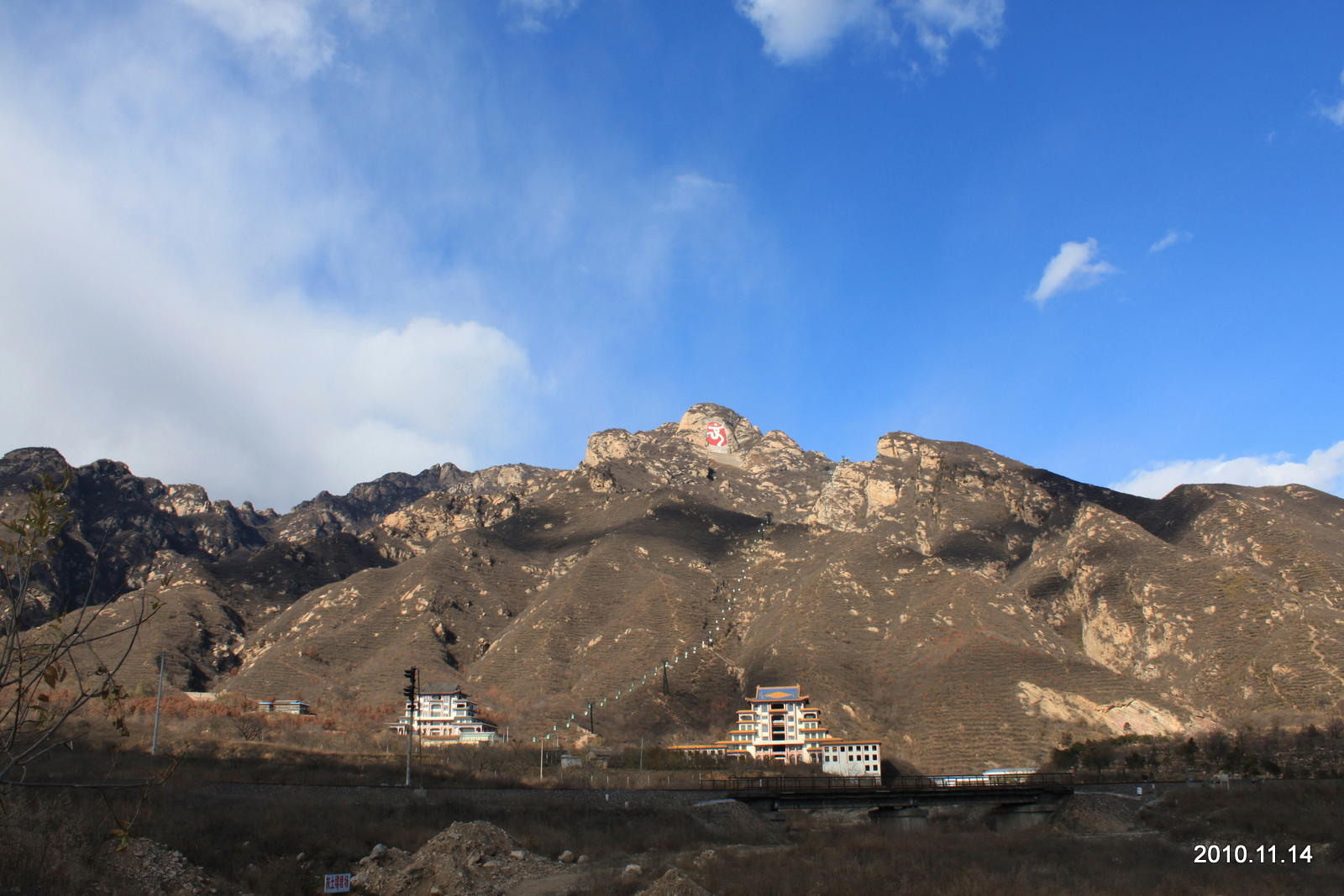
Yunlongjian on the west of the town, 2010

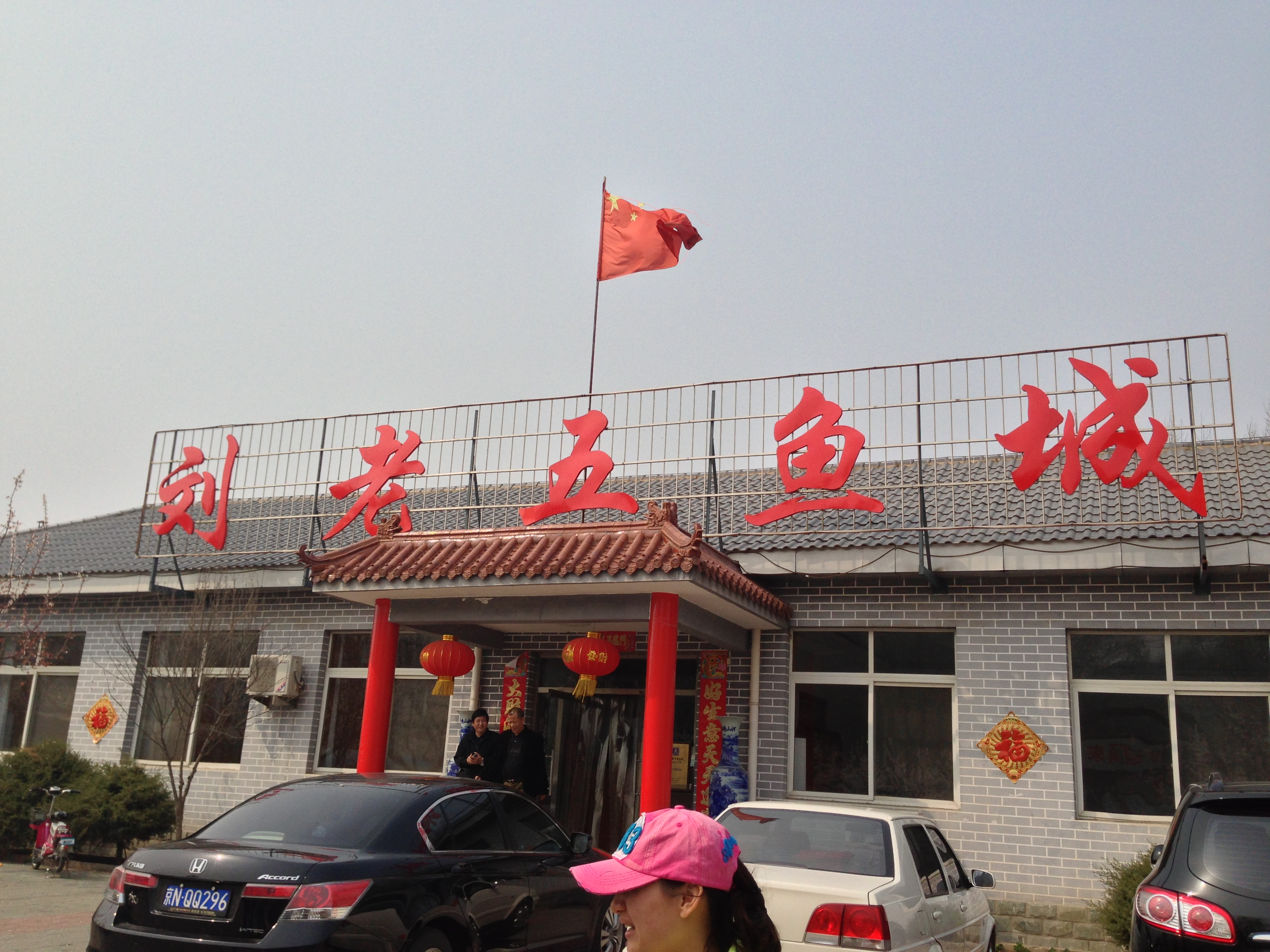
Building along the Shuiku South Line, 2013

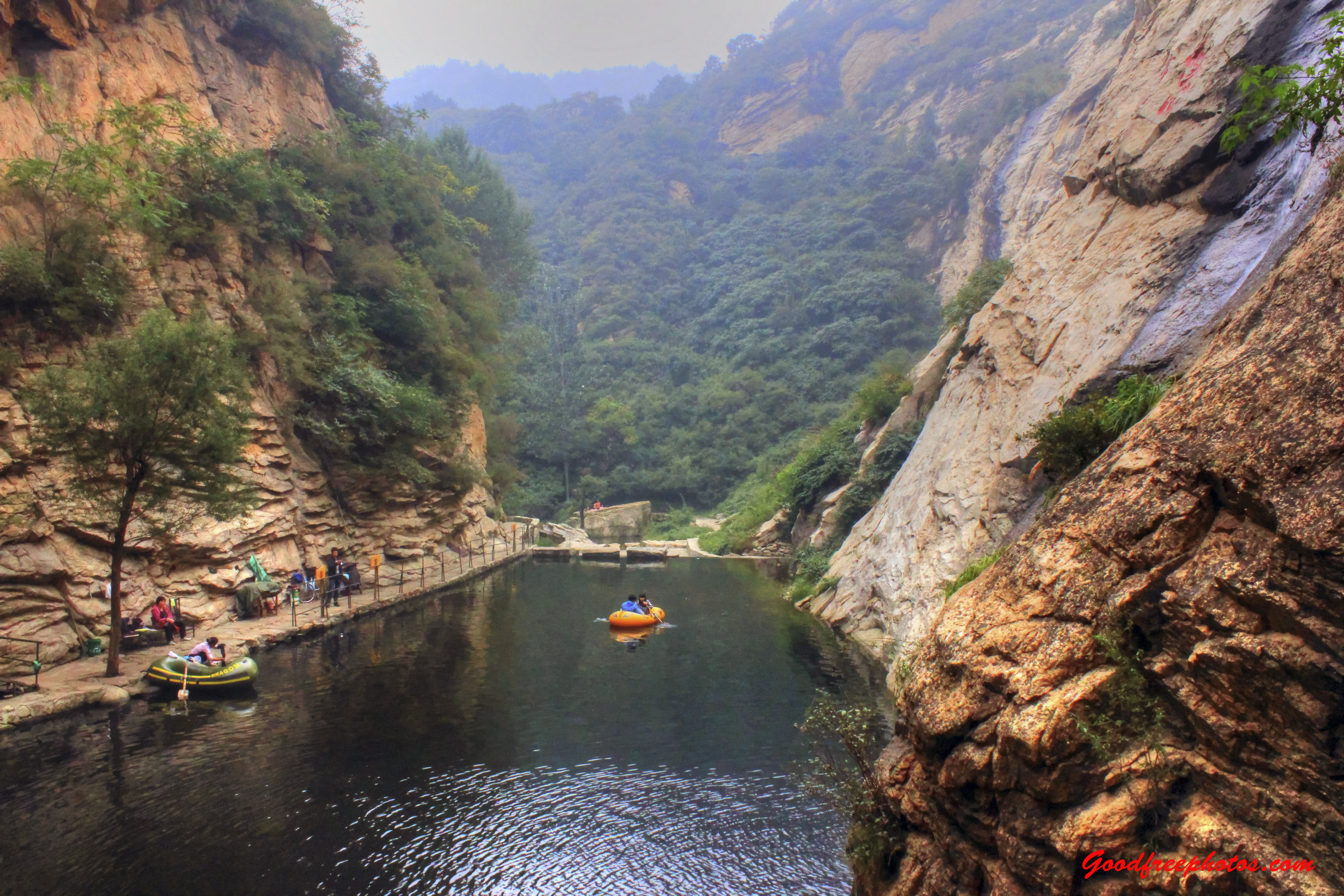
River Valley around Dayugou, 2013

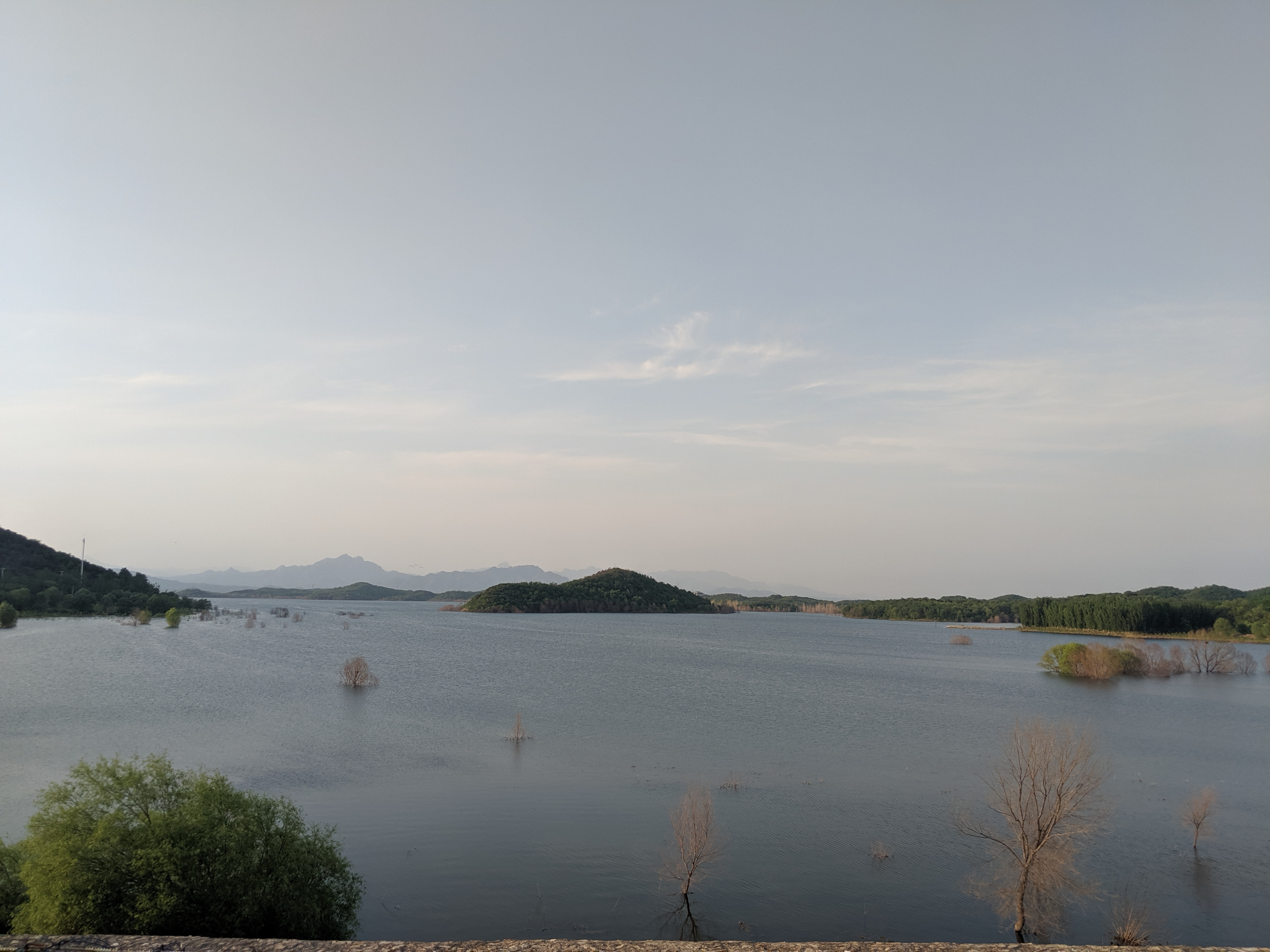
Miyun Reservoir, 2019

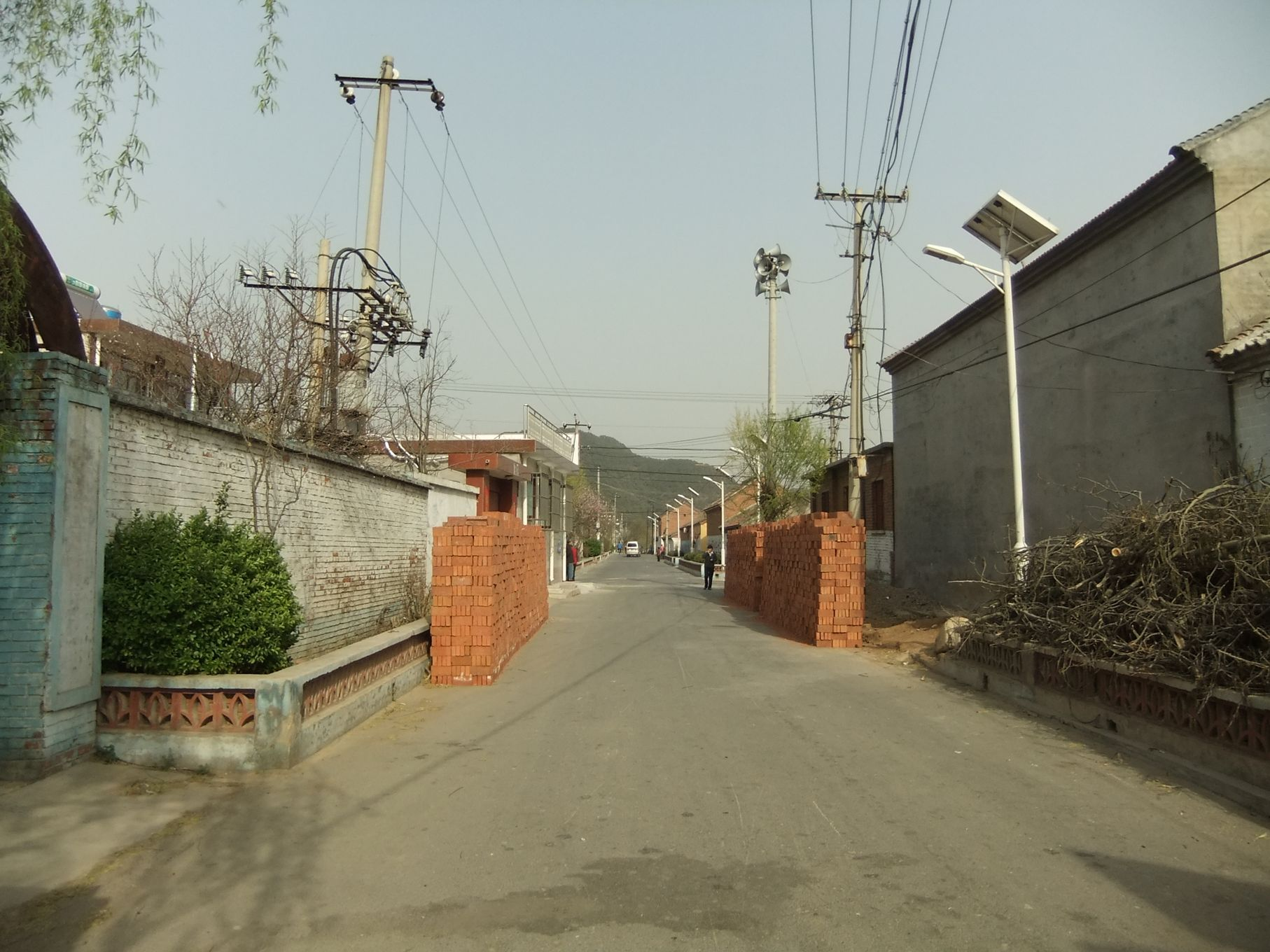
Jianyan Village on the west of the town, 2011

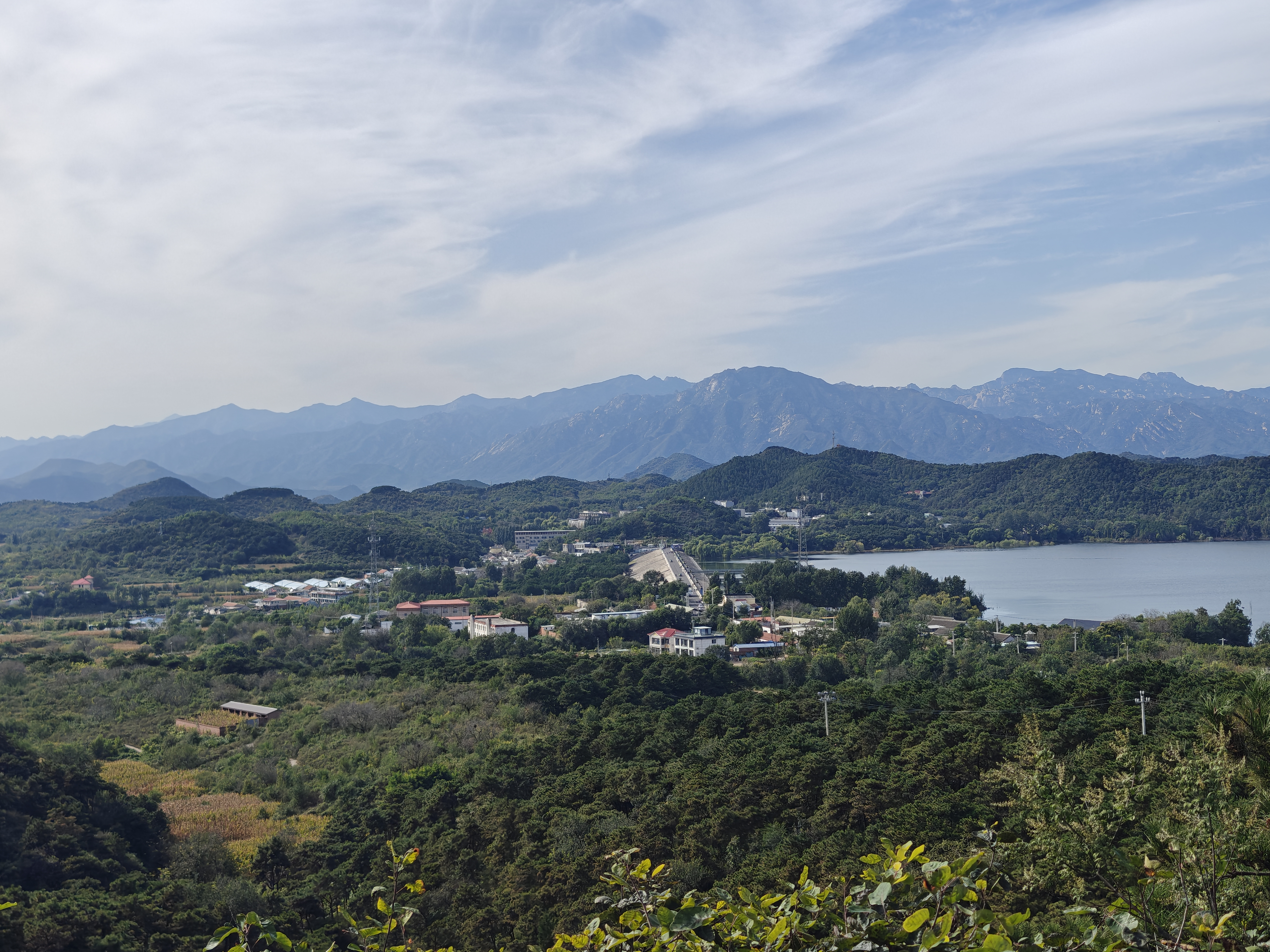
Miyun Reservoir Dam and surrounding villages, 2025

== See also ==
- List of township-level divisions of Beijing
