= Huaibei, Beijing =

Huaibei Town 怀北镇
- Town
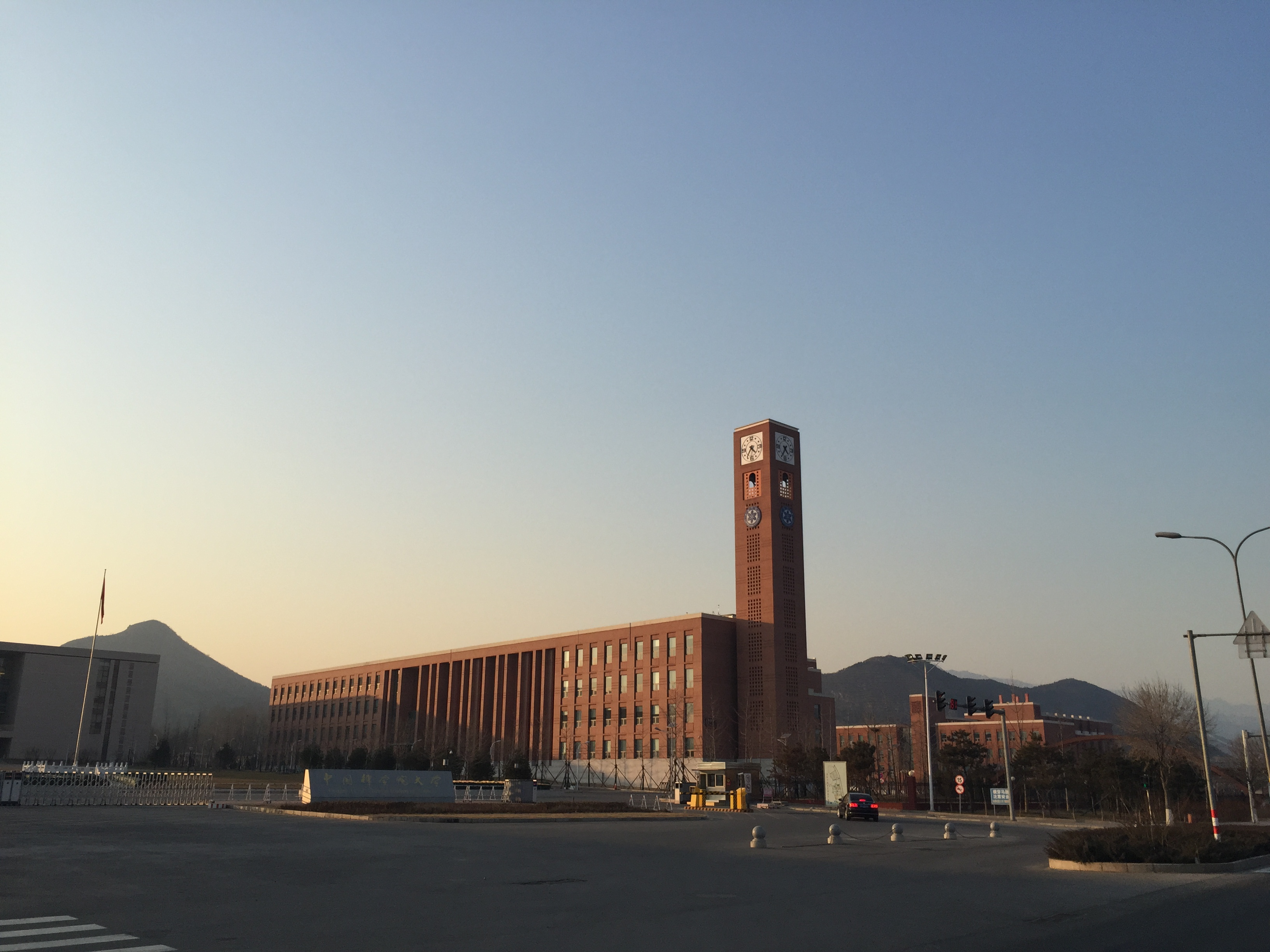
- University of the Chinese Academy of Sciences Yanqihu Campus, 2016

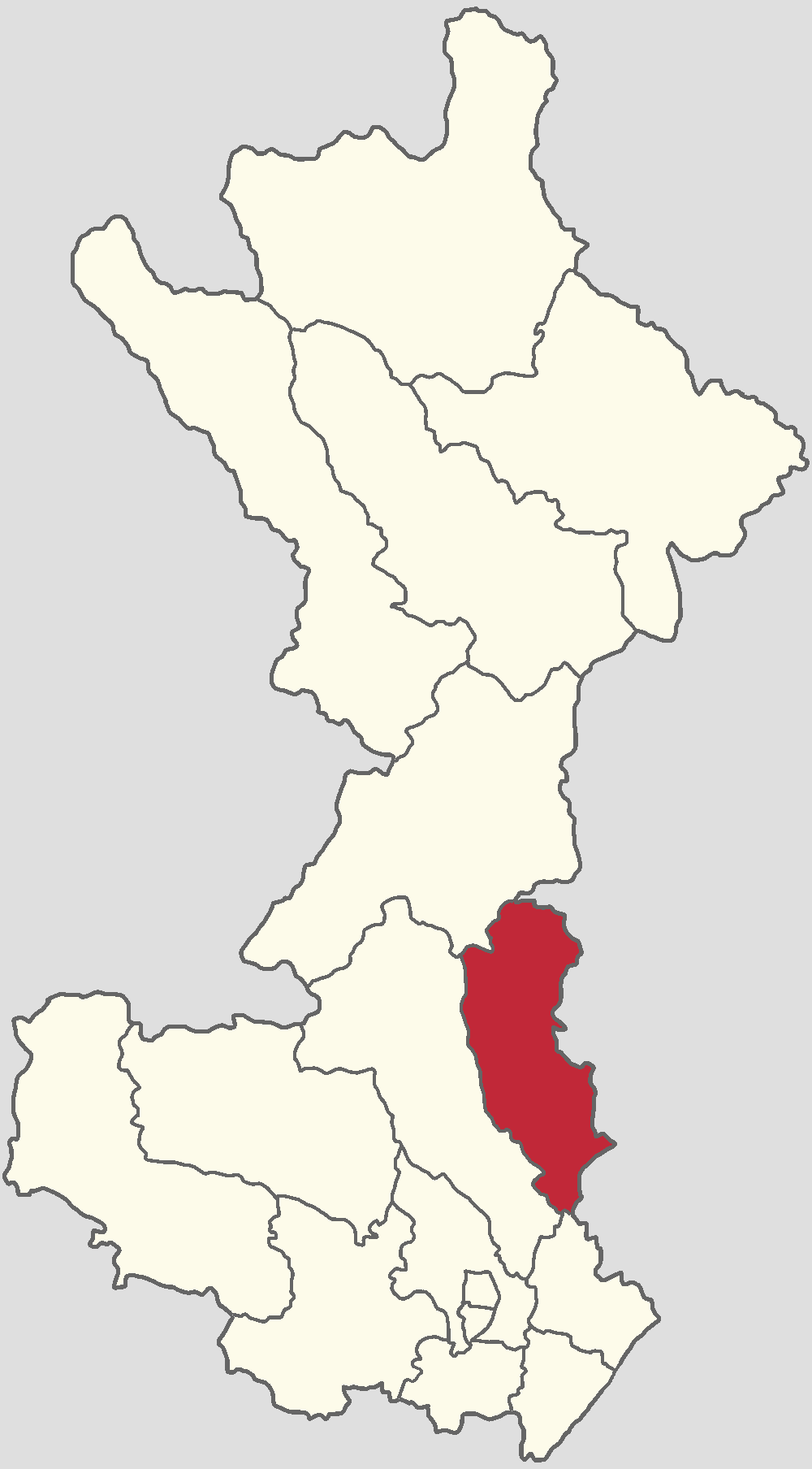
- Location in Huairou District

- Location within Beijing Location within China
- Coordinates: 40°23′15″N 116°41′01″E
- Country: China
- Municipality: Beijing
- District: Huairou
- Village-level Divisions: 1 community 10 villages

Area
  - Total: 103.4 km^{2} (39.9 sq mi)
- Elevation: 67 m (220 ft)

Population (2020)
  - Total: 22,487
  - Density: 217.5/km^{2} (563.3/sq mi)
- Time zone: UTC+8 (China Standard)
- Postal code: 101408
- Area code: 010

Huaibei Town (simplified Chinese: 怀北镇; traditional Chinese: 懷北鎮; pinyin: Huáiběi Zhèn) is a town located inside of Huairou District, Beijing, China. It borders Liulimiao and Shicheng Towns to its north, Xitiangezhuang Town to its east, Beifang Town to its south, and Yanqi Town to its west. According to the 2020 Chinese Census, the town had 22,487 people residing under its administration. The name of this town was taken from Huairoubei (Huairou North) Railway Station within the town, and it literally means "Huai(rou) North".

== History ==
Below is a table listing the historical divisions of the town. Before 1948, the region was divided north and south along the Great Wall of China, so the table will list the designation of land north of Great Wall above that of the south:

Timeline of Huaibei Town
| Time | Status | Belonged to |
|---|---|---|
| Ming dynasty | | Doyan Bag, Northern Yuan |
| Ming dynasty | | Huairou County, Shuntian Prefecture |
| Qing dynasty | | Luanping County, Chengde Prefecture |
| Qing dynasty | | Huairou County, Shuntian Prefecture |
| 1912 – 1948 | | Luanping County, Rehe Special District |
| 1912 – 1948 | | Huairou County, Capital Area |
| 1948 – 1949 | 5th District; 6th District | Huairou County, Capital Area |
| 1949 – 1956 | 5th District | Huairou County, Hebei |
| 1956 – 1958 | Majiafen Township; Hefangkou Township | Huairou County, Hebei |
| 1958 – 1959 | Under Dongfeng People's Commune | Huairou County, Beijing |
| 1959 – 1961 | Under Chengguan People's Commune | Huairou County, Beijing |
| 1961 – 1983 | Xizhuang People's Commune | Huairou County, Beijing |
| 1983 – 1990 | Xizhuang Township | Huairou County, Beijing |
| 1990 – 2001 | Huaibei Town | Huairou County, Beijing |
| 2001–present | Huaibei Town | Huairou District, Beijing |

This town is where the 2016 Creative Commons Asia Pacific Regional Meeting was hosted.

== Administrative divisions ==
As of the time in writing, Huaibei Town is subdivided into 11 divisions, consisted of 1 community and 10 villages:

| Subdivision names | Name transliteration | Type |
|---|---|---|
| 怀北铁路 | Huaibei Tielu | Community |
| 西庄 | Xizhuang | Village |
| 东庄 | Dongzhuang | Village |
| 怀北庄 | Huaibeizhuang | Village |
| 龙各庄 | Longgezhuang | Village |
| 神山 | Shenshan | Village |
| 邓各庄 | Denggezhuang | Village |
| 大水峪 | Dashuiyu | Village |
| 河防口 | Hefangkou | Village |
| 椴树岭 | Duanshuling | Village |
| 新峰 | Xinfeng | Village |

== Gallery ==
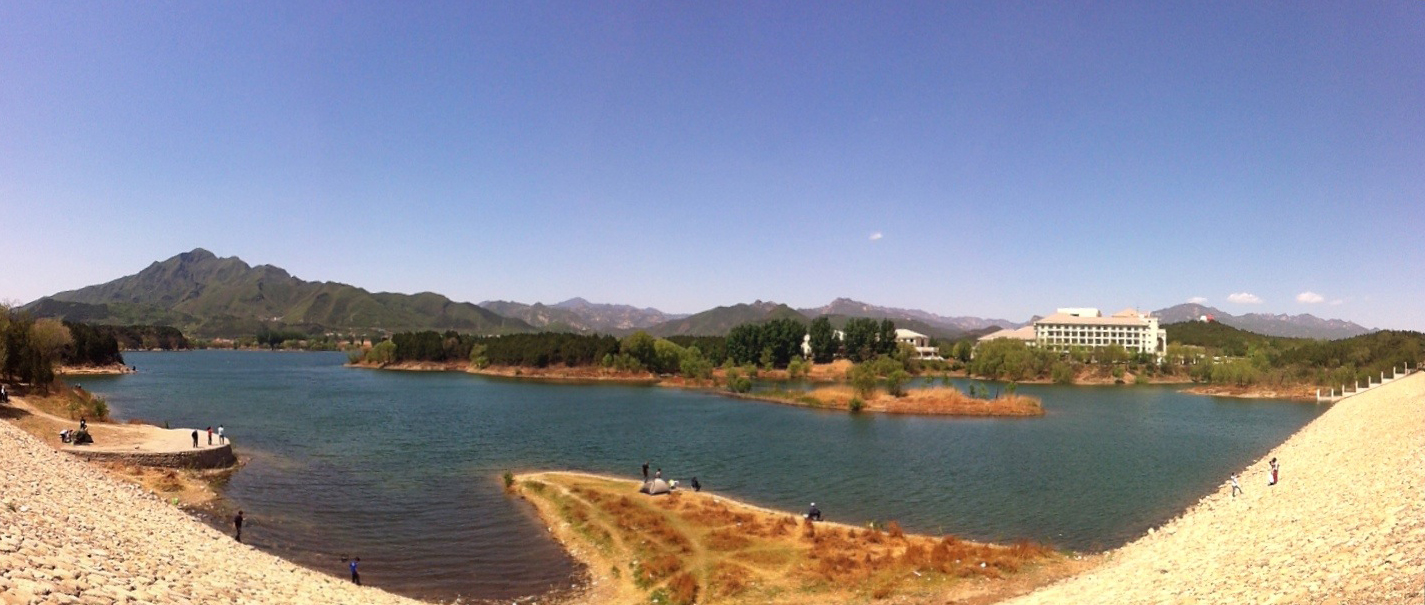
Yanqi Lake, 2011

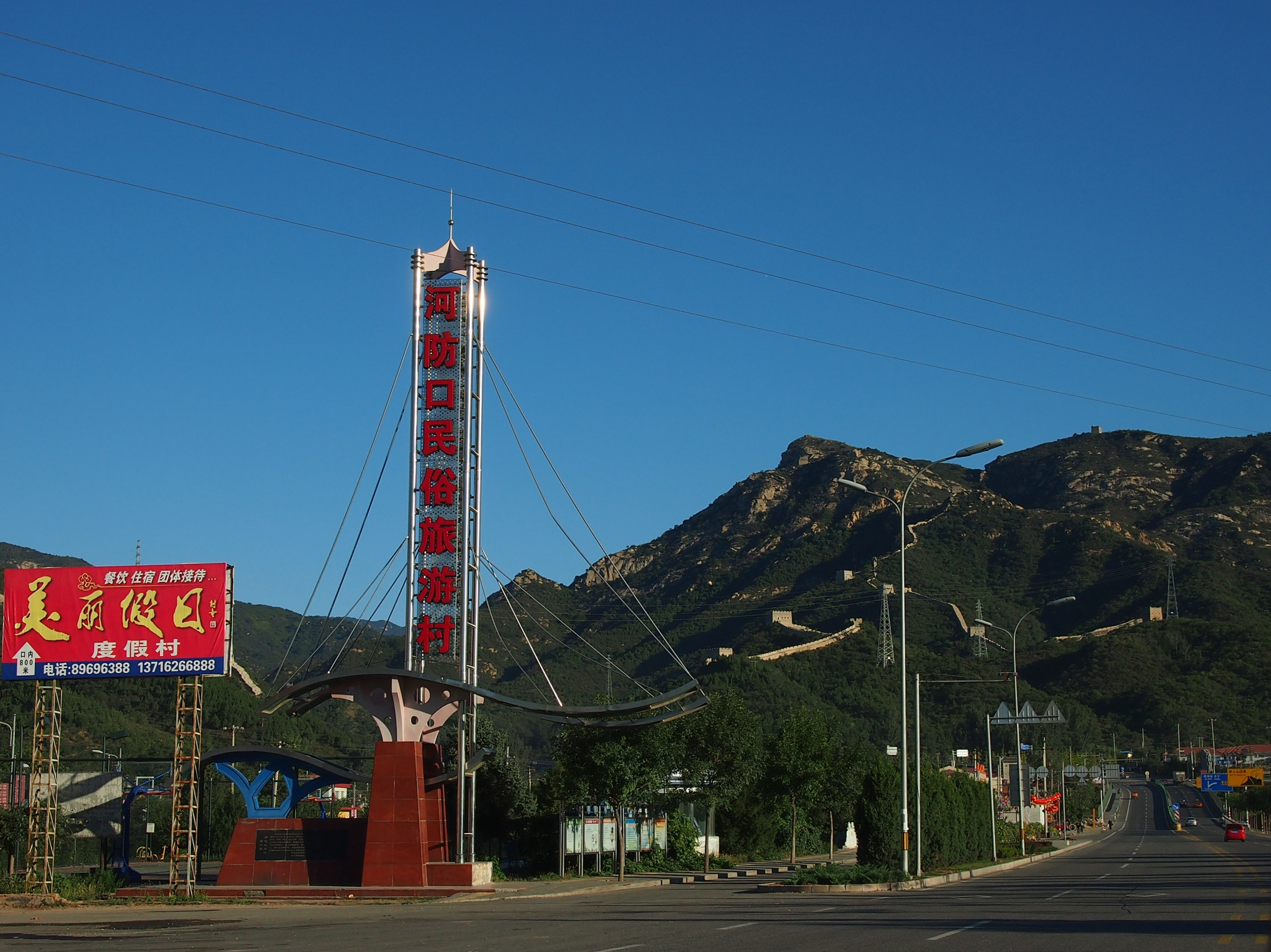
Hefangkou Village, 2012

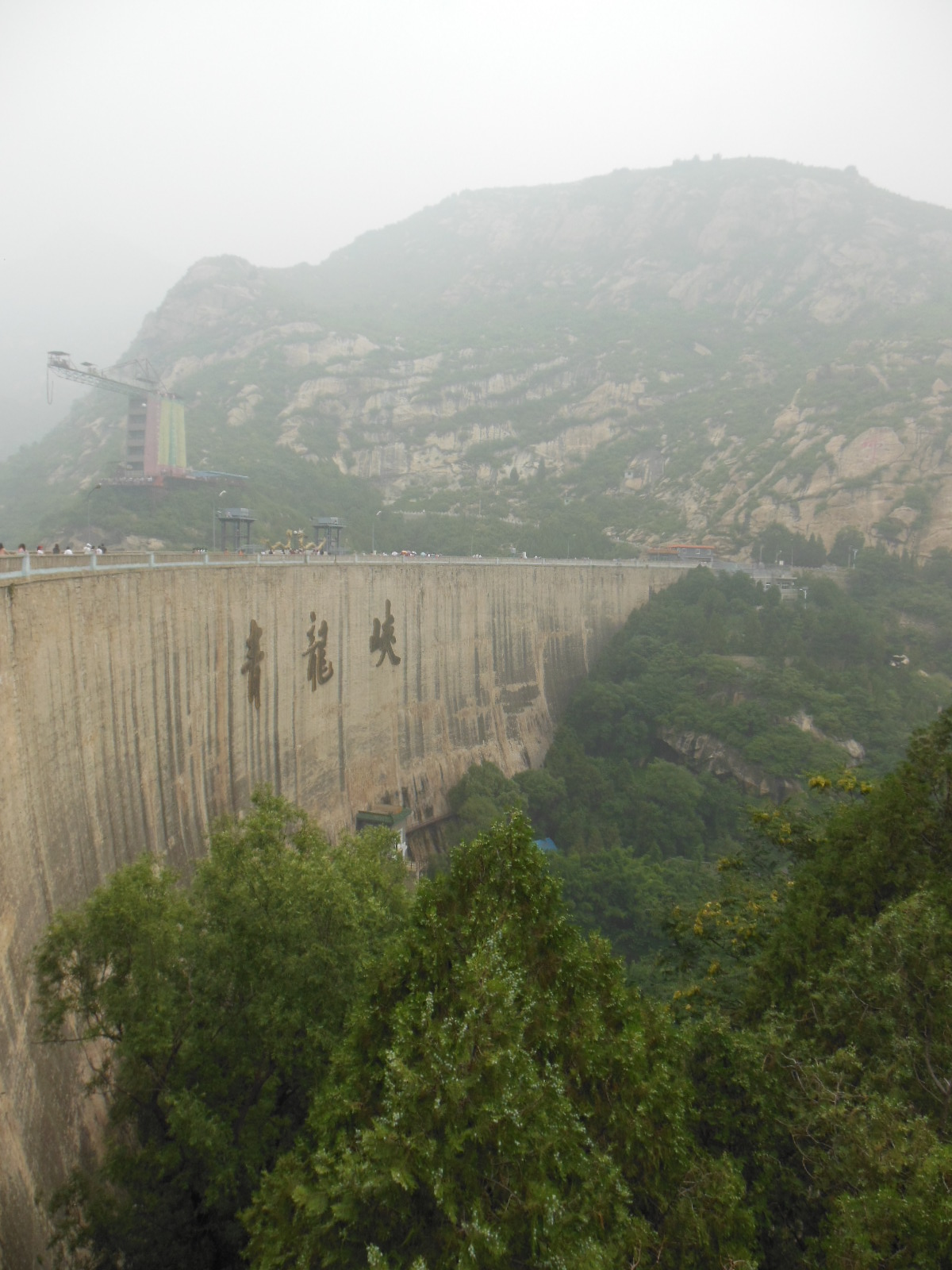
Qinglong Dam on the north of the town, 2012

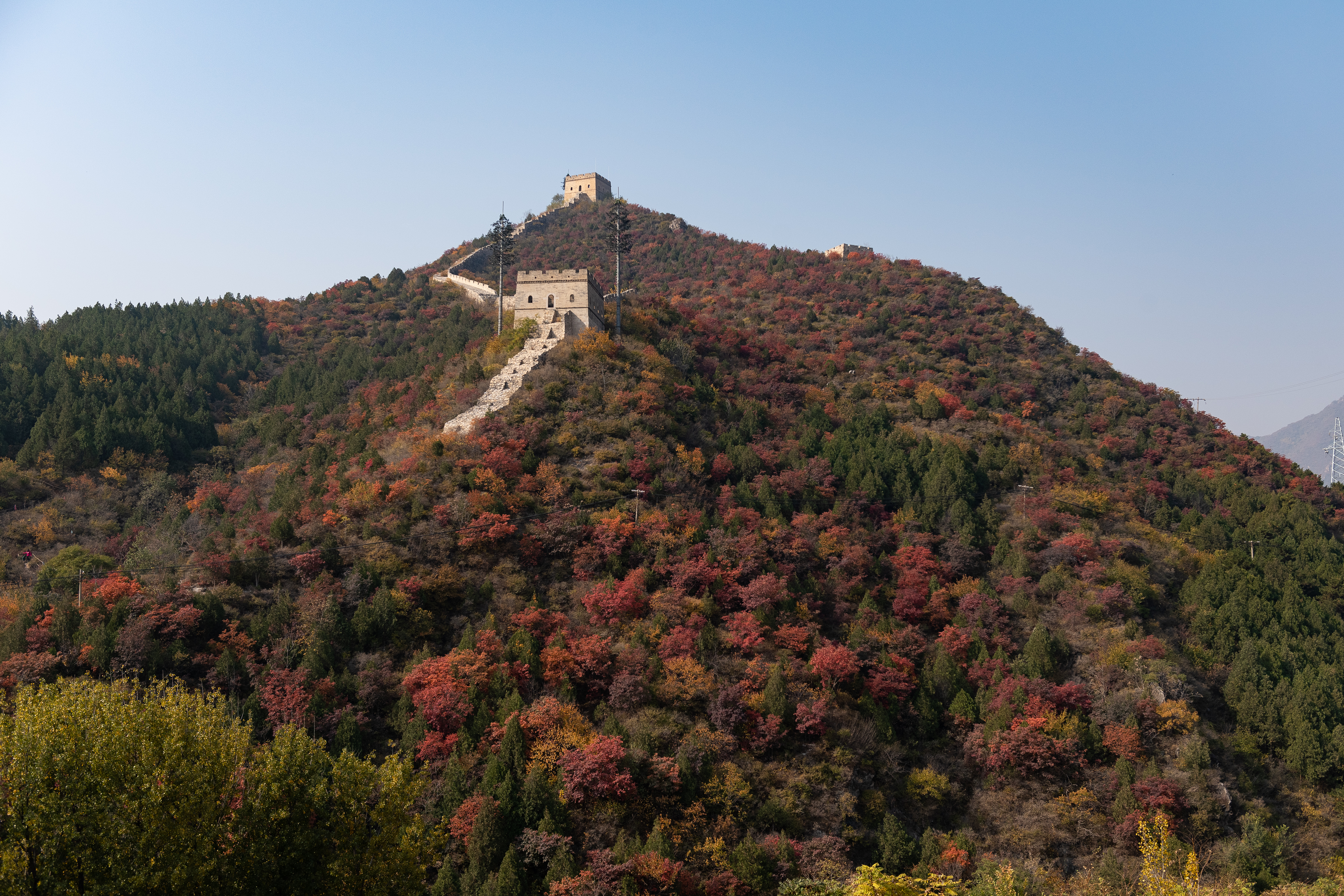
Section of the Great Wall around Jiugukou, 2020

== See also ==
- List of township-level divisions of Beijing
