= Yanqi, Beijing =

Yanqi Town 雁栖地区
- Town
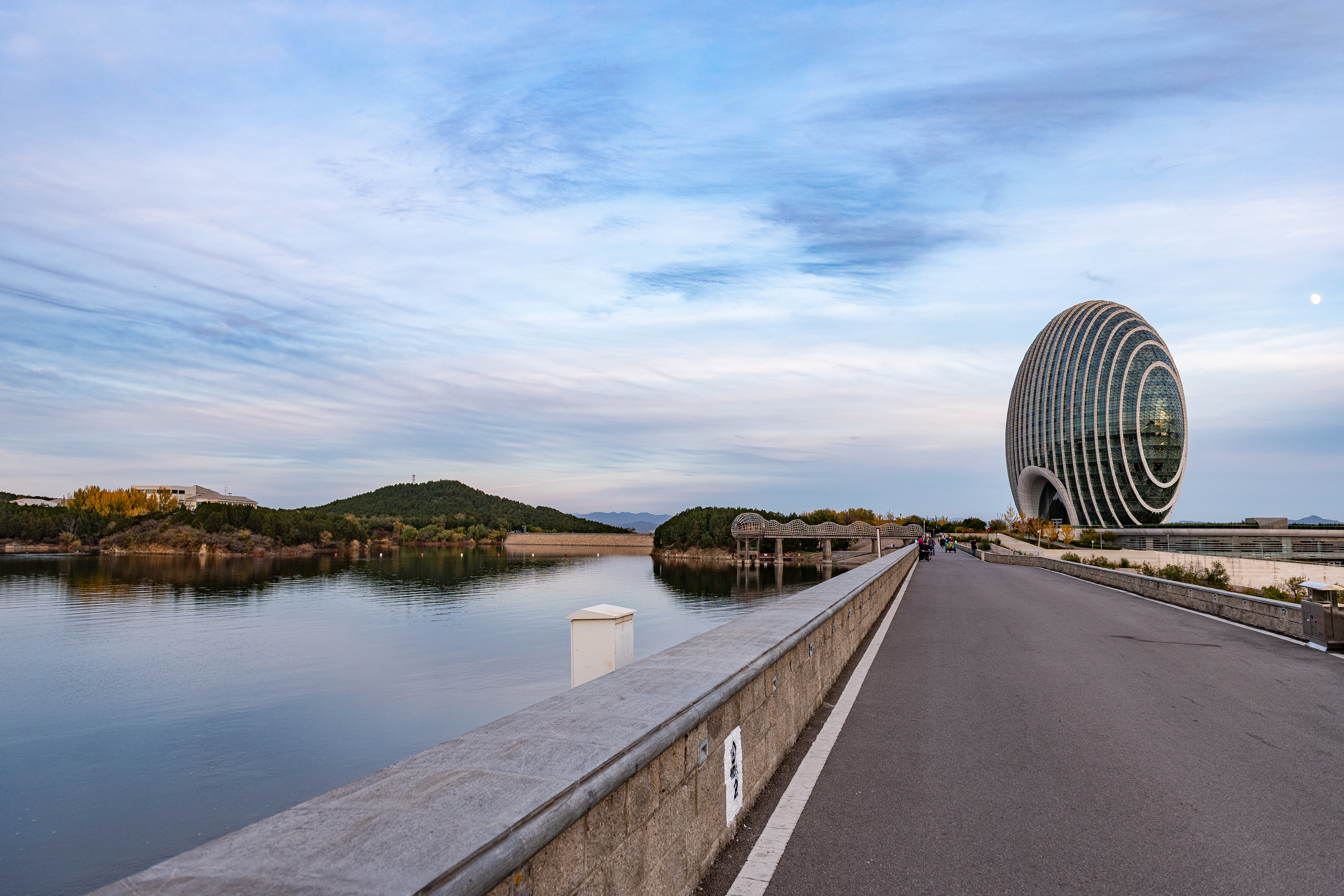
- Yanqi Lake and Sunrise Kempinski Hotel, 2020

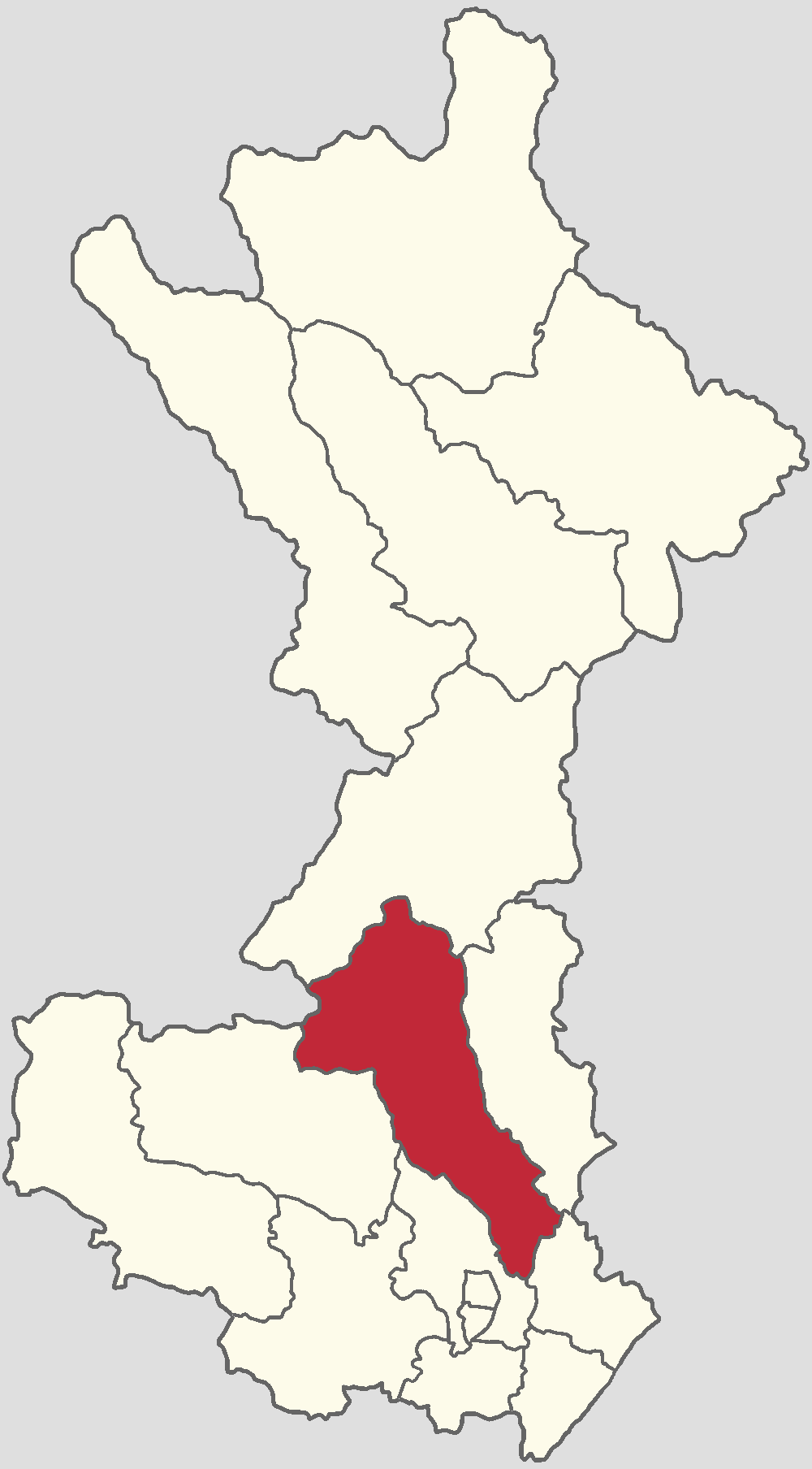
- Location within Huairou District

- Location within Beijing Location within China
- Coordinates: 40°21′39″N 116°39′24″E
- Country: China
- Municipality: Beijing
- District: Huairou
- Village-level Divisions: 2 communities 21 villages

Area
  - Total: 150.3 km^{2} (58.0 sq mi)
- Elevation: 56 m (184 ft)

Population (2020)
  - Total: 38,483
  - Density: 256.0/km^{2} (663.1/sq mi)
- Time zone: UTC+8 (China Standard)
- Postal code: 101407
- Area code: 010

Yanqi Town (Chinese: 雁栖镇; pinyin: Yànqī Zhèn) a town in southern Huairou District, Beijing, China. It shares border with Liulimiao Town in its north, Huaibei and Beifang Towns in its east, Huairou and Bohai Towns in its south, and Sihai Town in its west. Its total population was 38,483 in 2020.

The name Yanqi (Chinese: 雁栖; lit. 'Swan Geese Rest') corresponds to Yanqi River that passes through the area.

== History ==
Yanqi Town was formed from Badaohe and Fangezhuang Townships. The table below will list the historical designations of the two townships:

Timetable of Yanqi Area
Time	Status of		Belonged to	
Time	Badaohe	Fangezhuang	Badaohe	Fangezhuang
Qing dynasty		Fuleli	Luanping County, Zhili	Huairou County, Zhili
1912–1948		2nd District	Luanping County, Rehe	Huairou County, Capital Prefecture
1948–1956	5th District	5th District, 6th District	Huairou County, Hebei	
1956–1957	Badaohe Township, Dadi Township	Liugechang Township, Majiafen Township	Huairou County, Hebei	
1957–1958	Badaohe Township	Liugechang Township, Majiafen Township	Huairou County, Hebei	
1958–1959	Dadi Township, within Dongfeng People's Commune	Within Dongfeng People's Commune	Huairou County, Beijing	
1959–1960	Badaohe Production Team, within Chengguan People's Commune	Within Dongfeng People's Commune	Huairou County, Beijing	
1960–1961	Badaohe Production Team, within Chengguan People's Commune	Within Chengguan People's Commune	Huairou County, Beijing	
1961–1983	Badaohe People's Commune	Fangezhuang People's Commune	Huairou County, Beijing	
1983–1995	Badaohe Township	Fangezhuang Township	Huairou County, Beijing	
1995–1998	Badaohe Township	Yanqi Town	Huairou County, Beijing	
1998–2001	Yanqi Town		Huairou County, Beijing	
2001–present	Yanqi Town		Huairou District, Beijing	

== Administrative divisions ==
As of 2021, Yanqi Townoversaw 23 subdivisions, consisted of 2 communities and 21 villages:

Subdivision names	Name transliterations	Type
新村	Xincun	Community
柏泉	Boquan	Community
乐园庄	Leyuanzhuang	Village
陈各庄	Chengezhuang	Village
下庄	Xiazhuang	Village
范各庄	Fangezhuang	Village
永乐庄	Yonglezhuang	Village
北台下	Beitai Xia	Village
北台上	Beitai Shang	Village
下辛庄	Xiaxinzhuang	Village
泉水头	Quanshuitou	Village
柏崖厂	Boyachang	Village
长元	Changyuan	Village
莲花池	Lianhuachi	Village
神堂峪	Shentangyu	Village
官地	Guandi	Village
石片	Shipian	Village
北湾	Beiwan	Village
大地	Dadi	Village
头道梁	Toudaoliang	Village
西栅子	Xizhazi	Village
八道河	Badaohe	Village
交界河	Jiaojiehe	Village

== Gallery ==
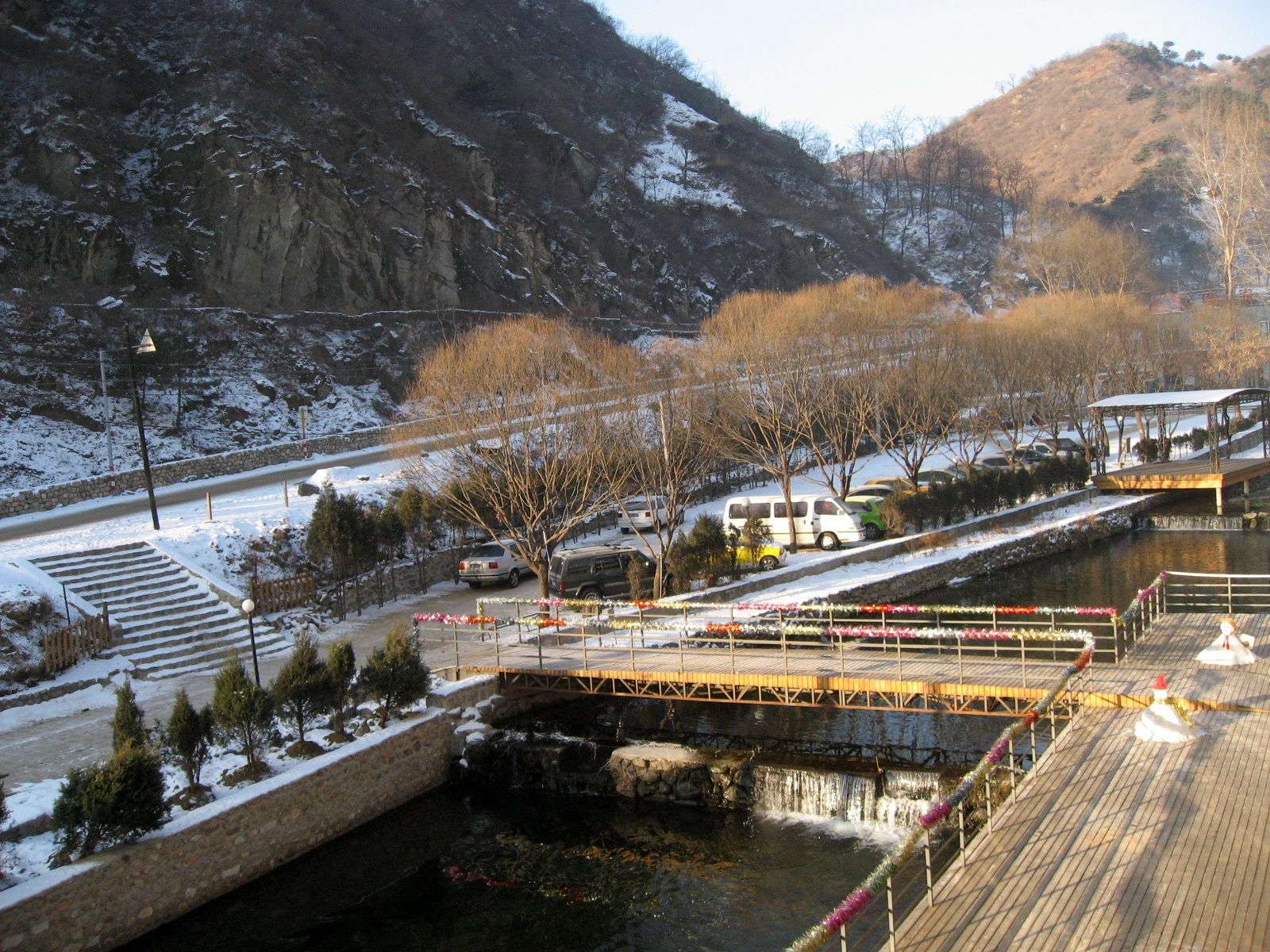
Buck Commune (Hotel), North of Yanqi Area, 2007

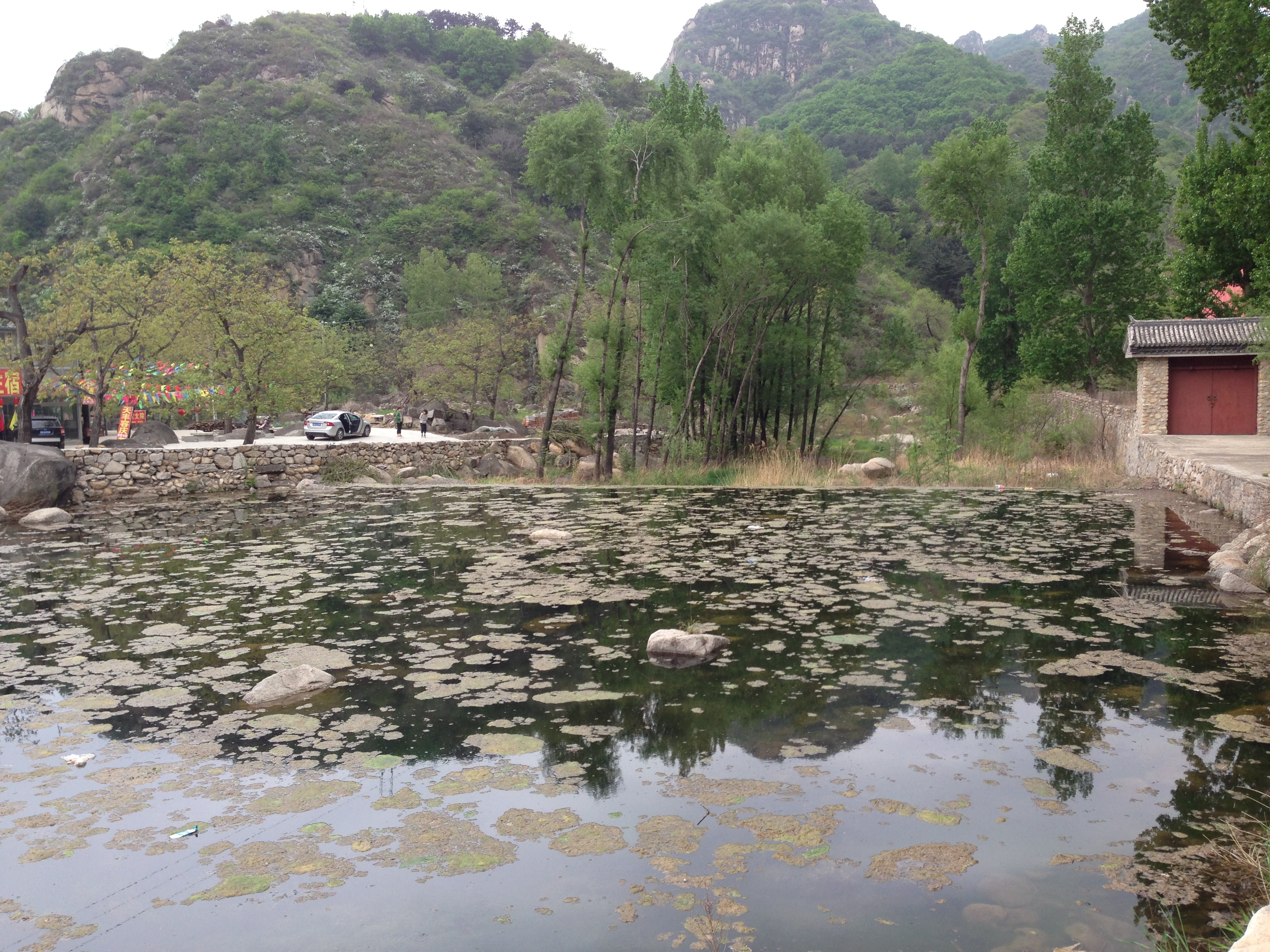
Sights near Jiaojiehe Village, 2013

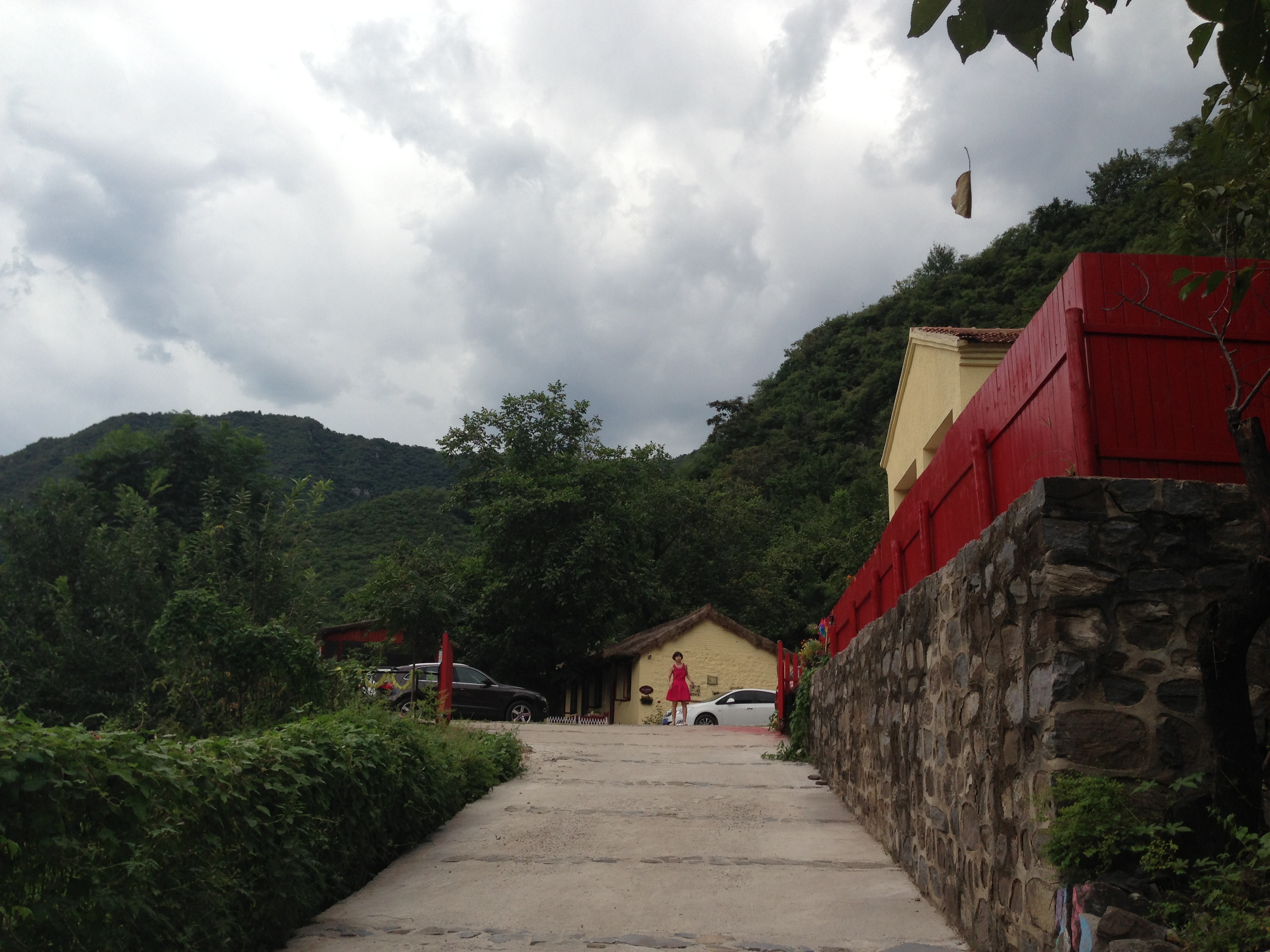
Shentangyu Village, 2013

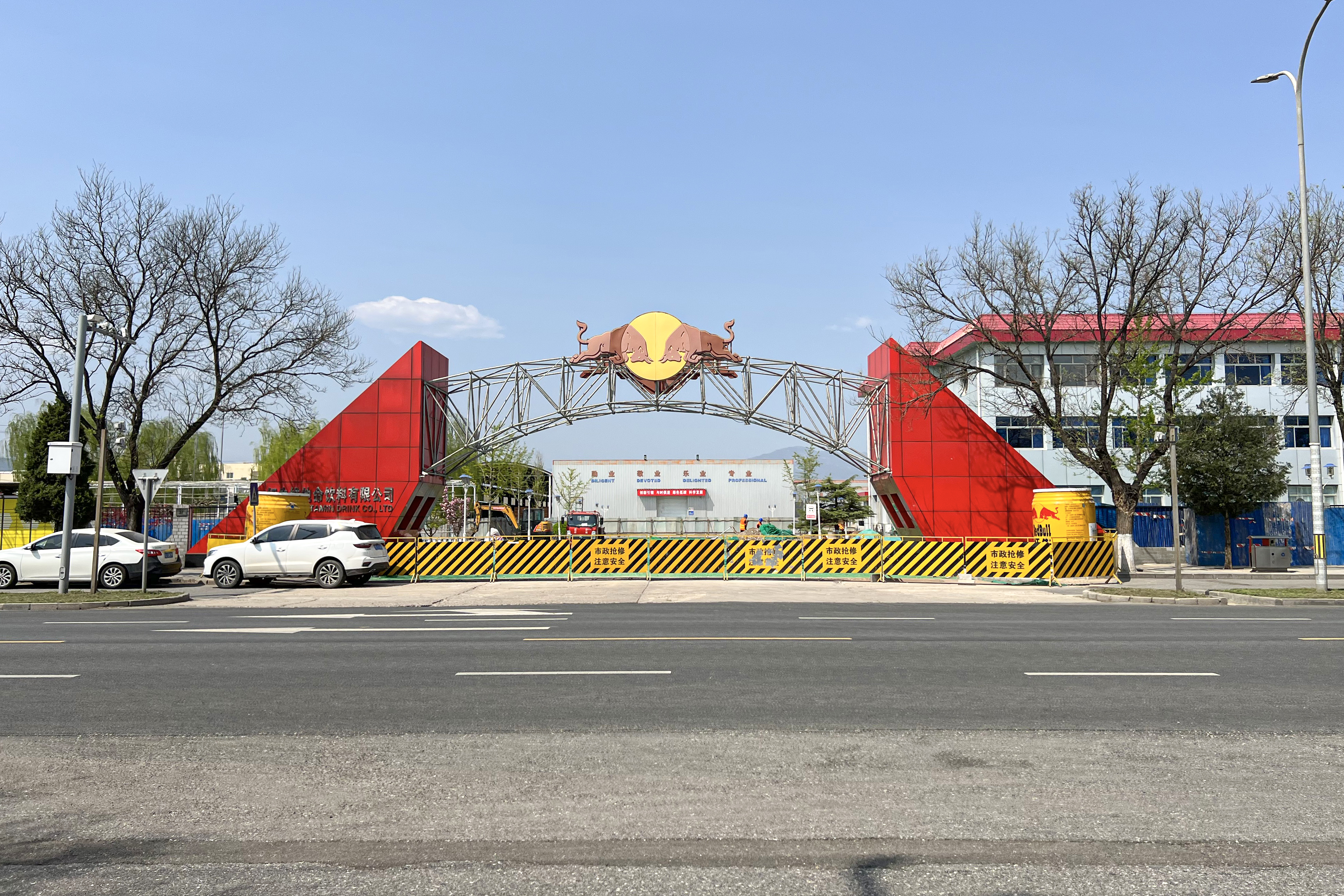
Red Bull Beijing Factory in the east of the area, 2022

== See also ==
- List of township-level divisions of Beijing
