= Lan Yu =

Lan Yu or Lanyu, can refer to:

== People ==
=== Surname: Lan; given name: Yu ===
- Lan Yu (general) (died 1393), general executed by Zhu Yuanzhang during the Ming dynasty
- Lan Yu (fashion designer) (born 1986), Chinese fashion designer

=== Given name: Lan; surname: Yu ===
- Yu Lan (1921–2020), Chinese actress

=== Given name: Lanyu, Lan-yu ===
- Hung Lan-yu (Chinese: 洪蘭友; 1900–1958), Chinese politician

== Places ==
- Orchid Island (Mandarin Chinese: 蘭嶼, romanized: Lán-Yǔ, lit. 'Orchid Island'; Laan Yuu), Lanyu Township, Taitung County, Taiwan Province, Republic of China; in the Philippine Sea
- Lanyu Township (Chinese: 蘭嶼鄉), Taitung County, Taiwan
- Lanyu railway (Mandarin Chinese: 兰渝铁路, romanized: Lán-Yú tiělù), a highspeed passenger rail line in China

== Other uses ==
- Lan Yu (film), 2001 Chinese film directed by Stanley Kwan

== See also ==
- Lan Yue
- Yulan (disambiguation)
- Lan (disambiguation)
- Yu (disambiguation)
