= Lan Yue =

Lan Yue, Lanyue, may refer to:

== Places ==
- Lanyue Pavilion, East Peak, Beishan Park, Chuanying District, Jilin City, Jilin Province, China
- Lanyue Homeland Mandarin Chinese: 兰悦家园, romanized: Lán-yuè Jiāyuán), Xinzhuang, Tianjin, China; a village
- Lanyue Ward (澜悦), Guoyuan Subdistrict, Miyun District, Beijing, China; a ward, a district
- Orchid Island (Mandarin Chinese: 蘭嶼, romanized: Lán-Yǔ, lit. 'Orchid Island'; Laan Yuu), Lanyu Township, Taitung County, Taiwan Province, Republic of China; in the Philippine Sea

== Other uses ==
- Lanyue (Mandarin Chinese: 揽月, romanized: Lǎn Yuè, lit. 'Embracing the Moon'), Chinese taikonaut lunar lander vehicle
- Exeed VX "Lanyue" (揽月), a Chinese luxury executive crossover SUV
- Lanyue, the Month of the Orchid (simplified Chinese: 兰月; traditional Chinese: 蘭月; pinyin: lányuè; lit. 'Orchid Month'), a traditional month in Chinese timekeeping equivalent to August; the 7th month on the Chinese calendar
- Chan Lan Yue, mother of Singaporean businessman Cheng Wai Keung (born 1951)

== See also ==
- Lan Yu (disambiguation)
- Lan (disambiguation)
- Yue (disambiguation)
