= Lans =

Lans or LANS may refer to:

== Places ==
- Lans, Tyrol, a municipality in Tyrol, Austria
- Lake Lans, a lake near Lans, Tyrol

=== France ===
- Lans, Saône-et-Loire
- Lans-en-Vercors, a community near Grenoble in the Vercors
- Villard-de-Lans, a community and ski station in the French Alps (1968 Winter Olympics)
- Mont-de-Lans, a town and commune until 2017 (now Les Deux Alpes, Isère)

== People ==
- Christiaan Lans (1789-1843), governor of the Dutch Gold Coast
- Håkan Lans (born 1947), Swedish inventor
- Lans Bovenberg (Arij Lans Bovenberg, born 1958), Dutch economist
- Van der Lans, Dutch surname

== Other uses ==
- Los Alamos National Security, the company that runs Los Alamos National Laboratory
- LAN (disambiguation)
