= Yulan =

Yulan, Yu Lan, may refer to

== Places ==
- Yulan, New York, USA; a community and census tract
- Yulan (Mandarin Chinese: 毓兰镇, romanized: Yù-Lán zhèn, lit. 'Yulan Town'), Dongkou County, Hunan, China

== People and characters ==
=== Persons ===
==== Given name: Yulan, Yu-lan ====
- Yulan Adonay Archaga Carias (born 1982), Honduran drug lord
- Gao Yulan (born 1982), Chinese rower
- Hu Yulan, Chinese tennis player
- Liu Yulan, Chinese-Indonesia journalist
- Ni Yulan (born 1960), Chinese civil rights lawyer
- Wang Yulan (singer), Chinese singer and idol group member
- Xu Yulan (born Wang Yulan, 1921–2017), Yue Opera singer-actress

==== Surname: Yu; given name: Lan ====
- Yu Lan (born 1921), Chinese actress

==== Given name: Yu; surname: Lan ====
- Lan Yu (general) (died 1393), general executed by Zhu Yuanzhang during the Ming dynasty
- Lan Yu (fashion designer) (born 1986), Chinese fashion designer

=== Fictional characters ===
- Lady Yulan, a Marvel Comics character

== Other uses ==
- Yulan Festival or Ghost Festival, a traditional Chinese festival
- Taiping Yulan, a Chinese encyclopedia
- Type 076 landing helicopter dock, the Yulan-class warship of China

== See also ==
- Lan Yu (disambiguation)
- Lan (disambiguation)
- Yu (disambiguation)
