= Anoshki, Nyasvizh district =

Village in Minsk Region, Belarus

Anoshki Анoшкі (Belarusian) Оношки (Russian)
- Agrotown
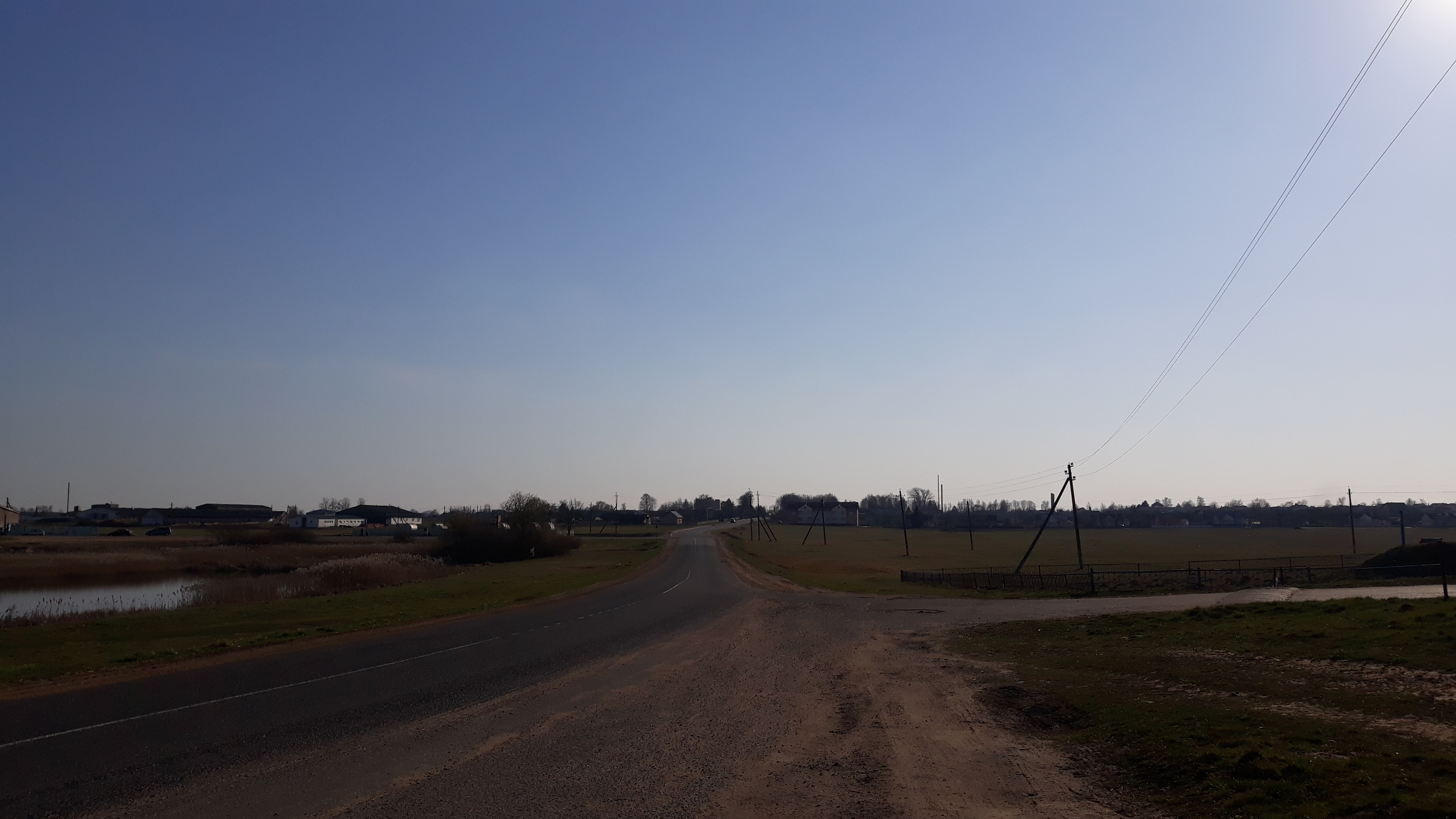
- View of road entering Anoshki.

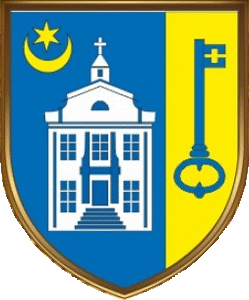
- Coat of arms

- Location in Belarus
- Coordinates: 53°11′06″N 26°28′31″E
- Country: Belarus
- Region: Minsk Region
- District: Nyasvizh District

Population (2009)
  - Total: 809
- Time zone: UTC+3 (MSK)

Anoshki (Belarusian: Анoшкі, romanized: Anoshki; Russian: Оношки, romanized: Onoshki ; Polish: Onoszki) is an agrotown in Nesvizh District, Minsk Region, Belarus. It is near the border between Minsk Region and Brest Region

== History ==
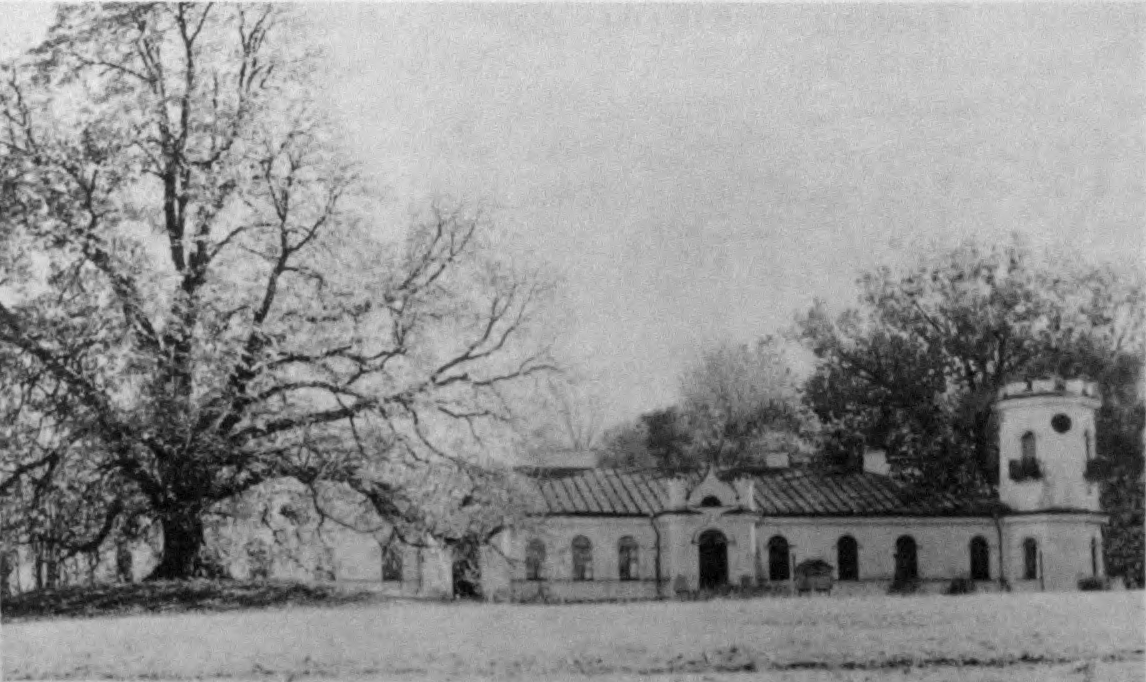
the Chapski manor, a building once located about one and a half kilometers south of Anoshki. It was destroyed during World War II.

In 1870, the village was part of the Minsk Governorate. During the Interwar period, the town was located in the Nowogródek Voivodeship of the Second Polish Republic.

The Orthodox Church of Saint Anna was built in Anoshki in the early 21st century.

== Demographics ==
Historical population
Year	Pop.	±%
1908	287.	—
1995	968	—
1999	953	−1.5%
2009	806	−15.4%
Population size may be affected by changes in administrative divisions.
