= Lan rural council =

Rural council in Belarus

Lan rural council Ланскі сельсавет (Belarusian) Ланский сельсовет (Russian)
- Rural council
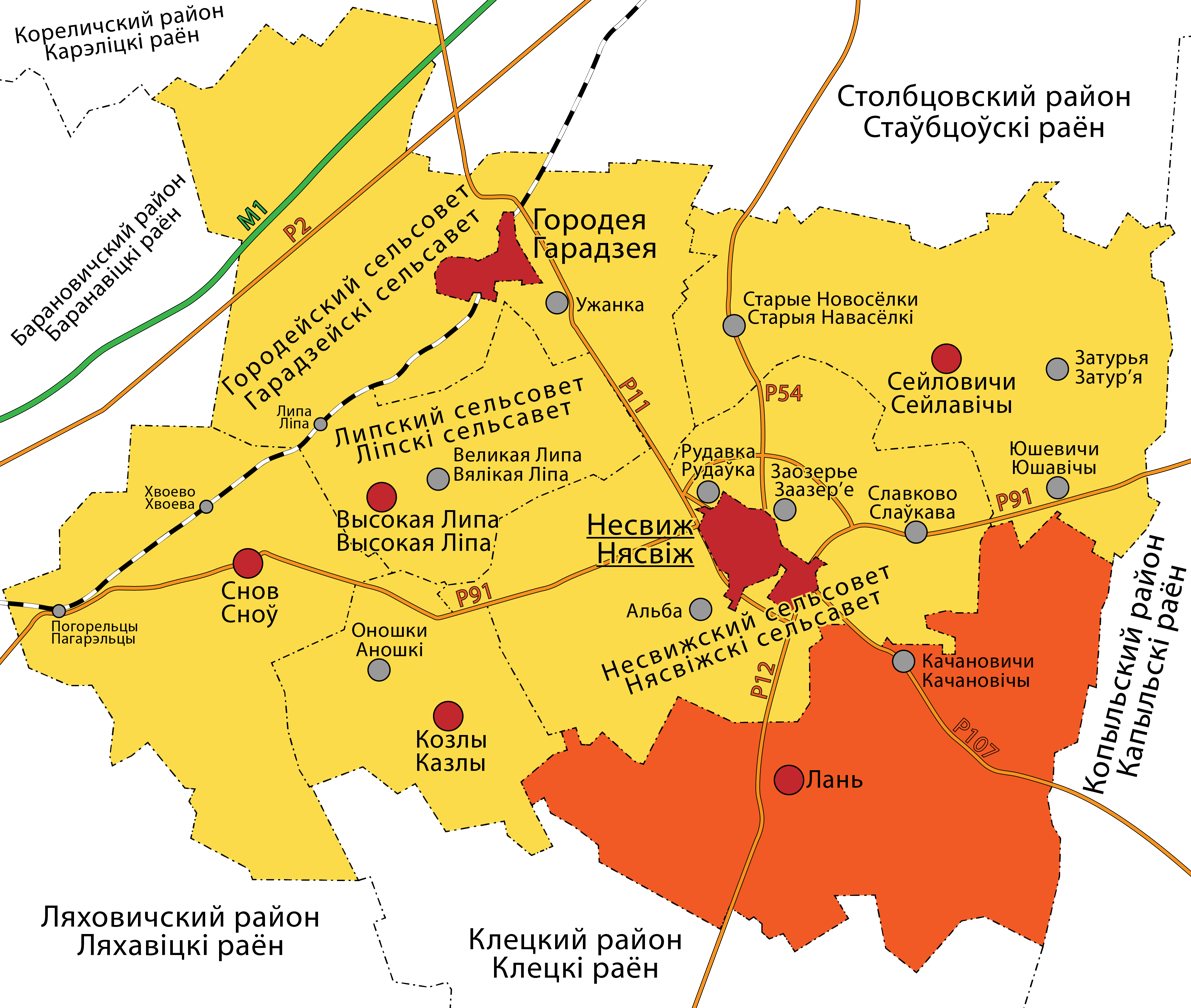
- Lan rural council
- Interactive map of Lan rural council
- Coordinates: 53°8′56″N 26°41′5″E
- Region: Minsk
- District: Nyasvizh
- Rural council: Lan

Population (2019)
  - Total: 2,505
- Time zone: UTC+3 (MSK)

Lan rural council (Russian: Ланский сельсовет, Belarusian: Ланскі сельсавет) is a lower-level subdivision (selsoviet) of Nyasvizh district, Minsk region, Belarus. Its center is the agrotown of Lan.
