= Lipski, Nyasvizh district rural council =

District council in the Nyasvizh district

Lipski rural council is a lower-level subdivision (selsoviet) of Nyasvizh district, Minsk region, Belarus.
