= Haradzyeya rural council =

Haradzyeya rural council is a lower-level subdivision (selsoviet) of Nyasvizh district, Minsk region, Belarus.
