= Shilipu =

Shilipu may refer to:

- Shilipu station (Beijing Subway) (十里堡)
- Shilipu station (Wuhan Metro) (十里铺)
- Shilipu, Beijing
- Shilipu Village, Xincai County, Henan Province (十里铺)
- Shilipu Township, Guangping County, Hebei Province (十里铺)
- Shilipu Township, Changli County, Hebei Province (十里铺)
- Shilipu, Meichuan, a village in Wuxue, Huanggang, Hubei
- Shilipu (十里铺), Shayang County, Jingmen, Hubei
