= Kazly, Nyasvizh district rural council =

Kazly rural council is a lower-level subdivision (selsoviet) of Nyasvizh district, Minsk region, Belarus.
