= Baggersee Innsbruck =

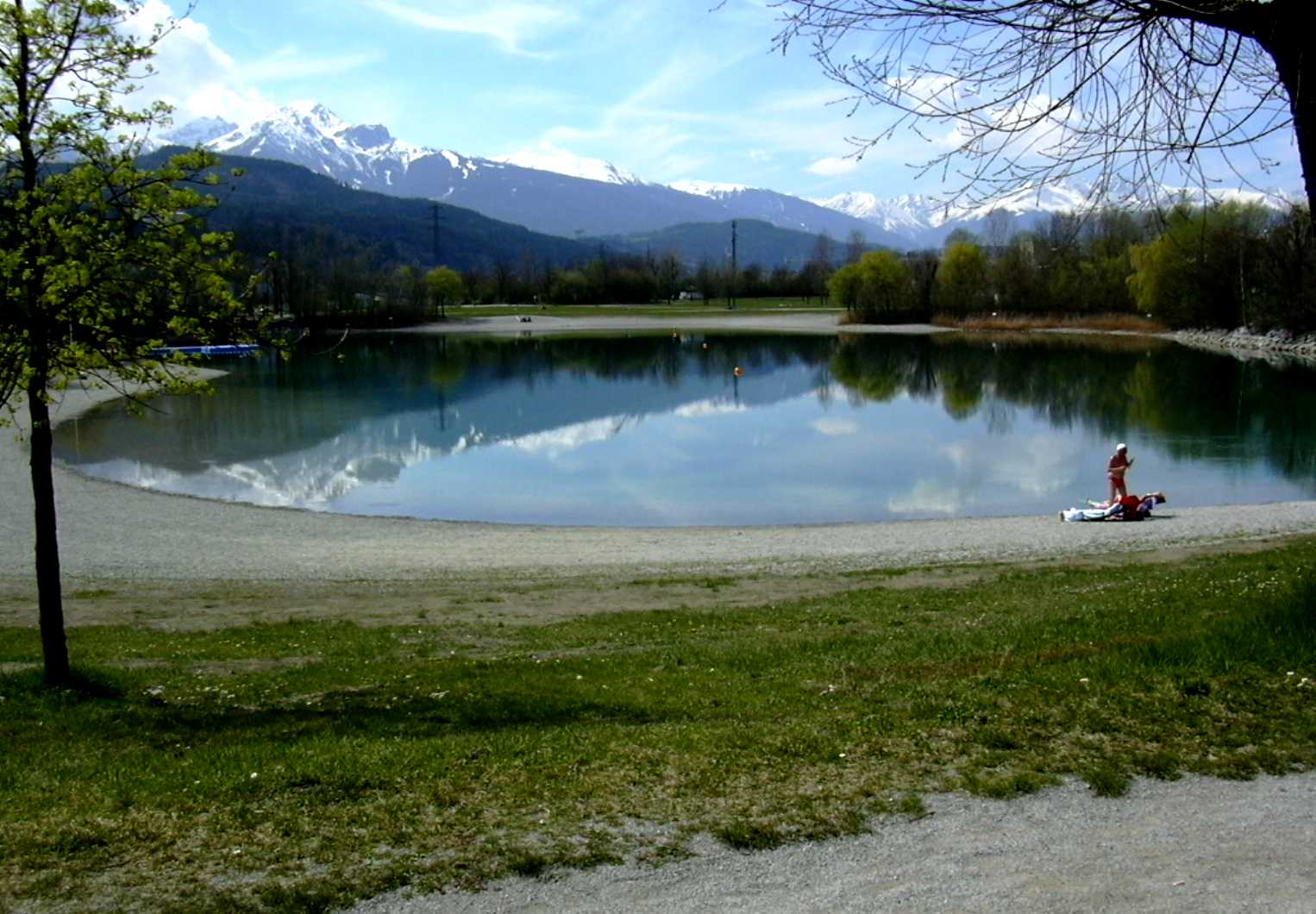

- Location within Austria
- Location: Innsbruck
- Coordinates: 47°15′56″N 11°26′48″E
- Type: artificial lake
- Basin countries: Austria
- Surface area: 0.028 km^{2} (0.011 sq mi)
- Water volume: 923,000 m^{3} (748 acre⋅ft)
- Surface elevation: 575 m (1,886 ft)

Baggersee Innsbruck (also: Baggersee Rossau) is located in the south-eastern part of Innsbruck at the Inn River and belongs to the city district Amras. With an area size of 2.8 ha it is the second largest lake in the city area. Only the Lake Lans surpasses it by size and volume.

Many people use the lake as a recreation area in summer. The water can warm up to 24 °C. Recreational activities at the lake include beach volleyball, badminton, streetball and table tennis. In fall the water is intensively used for surfing.

Despite the high usage, the water quality remains constant at Grade B. Reed regions, fresh water supply and subterranean connections with the sewage treatment plant Rossau and Inn River provide the Lake with sufficient water upheavals. Rare water birds like cormorants and swans were detected by ornithologists who use this territory during the non-bathing season.
