= Lanser Moor =

Lanser Moor Water Lily Pond
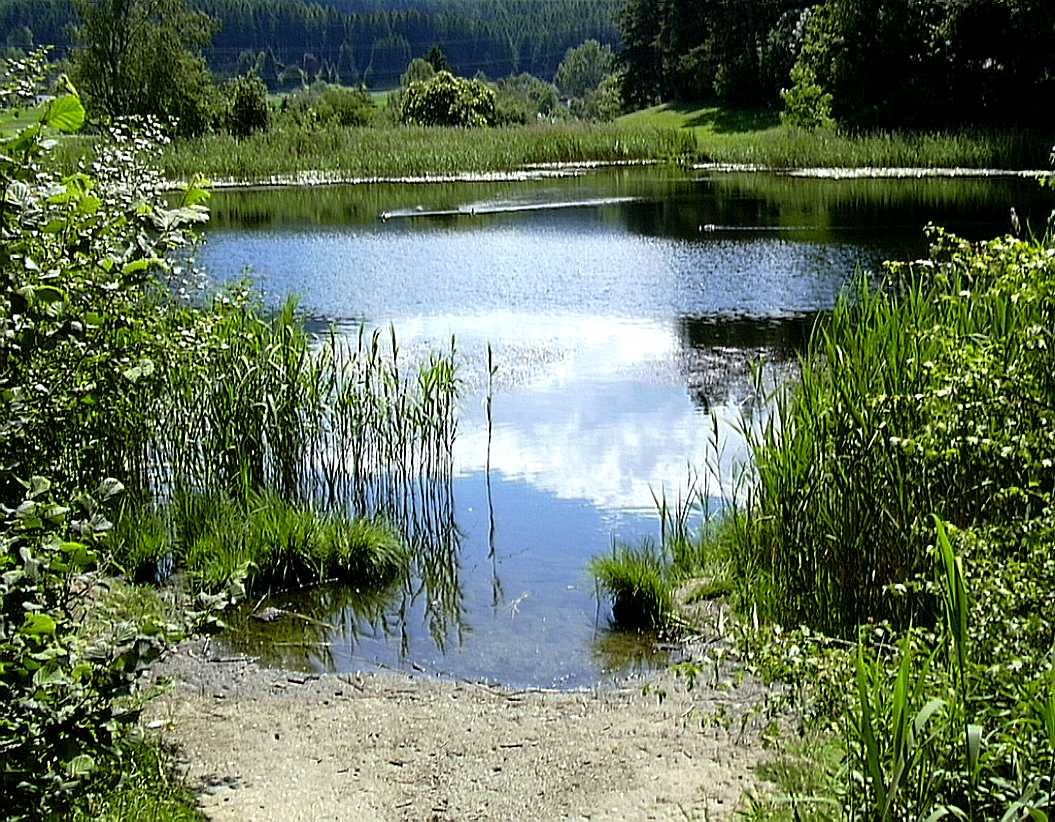

- Location within Tyrol, Austria
- Location: Innsbruck, Tyrol
- Coordinates: 47°14′26″N 11°25′06″E
- Type: Moorland Lake
- Primary inflows: none
- Primary outflows: none
- Basin countries: Austria
- Max. length: 80 m (260 ft)
- Max. width: 100 m (330 ft)
- Surface area: 8,000 m^{2} (86,000 sq ft)
- Average depth: 3 m (9.8 ft)
- Water volume: 24.000 m^{3} (0.019457 acre⋅ft)
- Surface elevation: 582 m (1,909 ft)
- Islands: none
- Settlements: Innsbruck, Lans

The Fen of Lans (also Lanser Moor or Water Lily Pond) is located north above Lake Lans at an altitude of 582 metres in the Paschberg forest. With an area of 8000 m² and a depth of 3 metres the lake is much smaller than its neighbour.

To keep its natural beauty intact, bathing and swimming was already forbidden by the city administration of Innsbruck very early. The lake is under nature conservation. The muddy water has reed-lined shores which often hide big quicksand-like puddles. The water quality fluctuates between A and B grade. Smaller kinds of carp, roach, and rudd live in the lake and several ducks call the lake home.
