= Mühlsee =

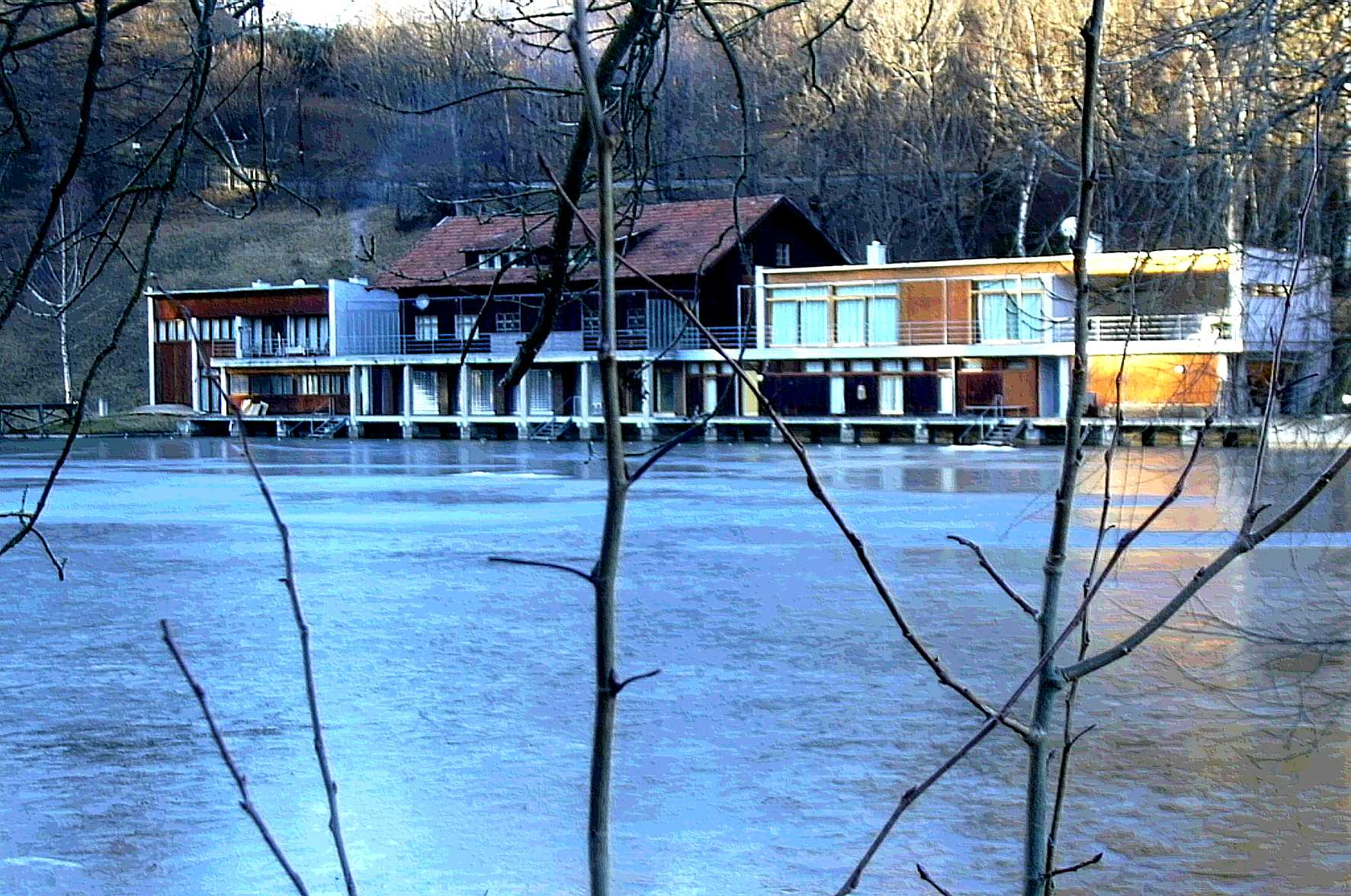
- Frozen lake in winter

- Location within Tyrol, Austria
- Location: Tyrol
- Coordinates: 47°14′35″N 11°25′43″E
- Basin countries: Austria
- Surface area: 6.28 ha (15.5 acres)
- Average depth: 3 m (9.8 ft)
- Max. depth: 7 m (23 ft)
- Surface elevation: 960 m (3,150 ft)

The Mühlsee, or Lake Mills, is a lake in Lans, Tyrol. It had an inflow and outflow, but they were buried in 2005. Nowadays, the lake is without fresh water.

In 1840, the lake was drained. It was allowed to refill after a fire in 1902.

The lake is mainly used for fish breeding; bathing is prohibited due to the small size. Sometimes the lake is plagued by algae. There are high reeds along the shore often hiding fen puddles which act like quicksand.
