= China Foods Limited =

Chinese food company

- Native name: 中国食品有限公司
- Company type: Public (Red chip)
- Traded as: SEHK: 506
- Industry: Food processing and trading
- Founded: 1993
- Headquarters: Beijing, China
- Area served: China
- Key people: Yu Xubo (Chairman)
- Number of employees: 18,000
- Parent: COFCO Group
- Website: www.chinafoodsltd.com

China Foods Limited (Chinese: 中国食品有限公司), shortly China Foods and formerly COFCO International Limited (中国粮油国际有限公司), is a listed company in the Hong Kong Stock Exchange, which is engaged in food processing and food trading, including oilseed, wineries, beverage, confectionery, wheat, brewing materials, rice, biofuel, biochemicals, edible oil and non-rice foodstuff products. On January 4, 2019, the Chairman of the company, Ma Jianping, stepped down. On the same day, Yu Xubo was appointed as chairman of the board. [1]

Since 21 March 2007, it has split and listed China Agri-Industries Holdings Limited (中国粮油控股有限公司) in the Hong Kong Stock Exchange. COFCO Wines & Spirits Co., Ltd. is a subsidiary of COFCO group that specializes in alcoholic drinks business.

== See also ==
- List of food companies
