= Van der Lans =

Van der Lans or VanderLans is a Dutch toponymic surname, literally meaning "from the lance", but probably referring to a location named De Lans. Notable people with the surname include:

- Brigitte van der Lans (born 1968), Dutch backstroke swimmer
- Jan van der Lans (1933–2002), Dutch psychologist
- Jos van der Lans (born 1954), Dutch journalist, writer and politician
- Piet van der Lans (1940–2018), Dutch Olympic cyclist
- Rudy VanderLans (born 1955), Dutch graphic designer and typographer
- Olav van der Lans (born 1992), Dutch marketeer

== See also ==
- Lans (disambiguation)
