= Gulou Subdistrict, Beijing =

Gulou Subdistrict 鼓楼街道
- Subdistrict
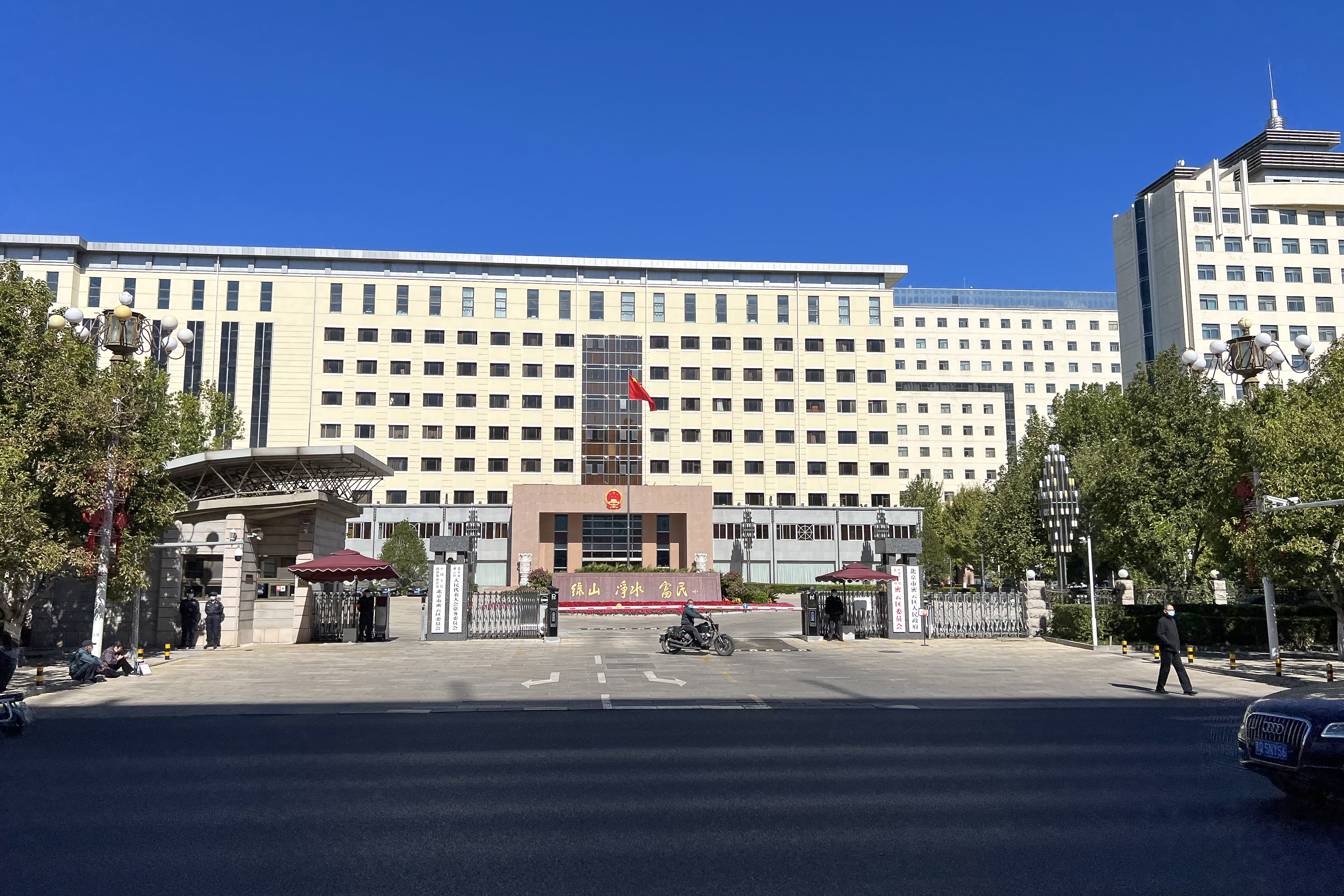
- Government building of Miyun District within Gulou Subdistrict, 2022

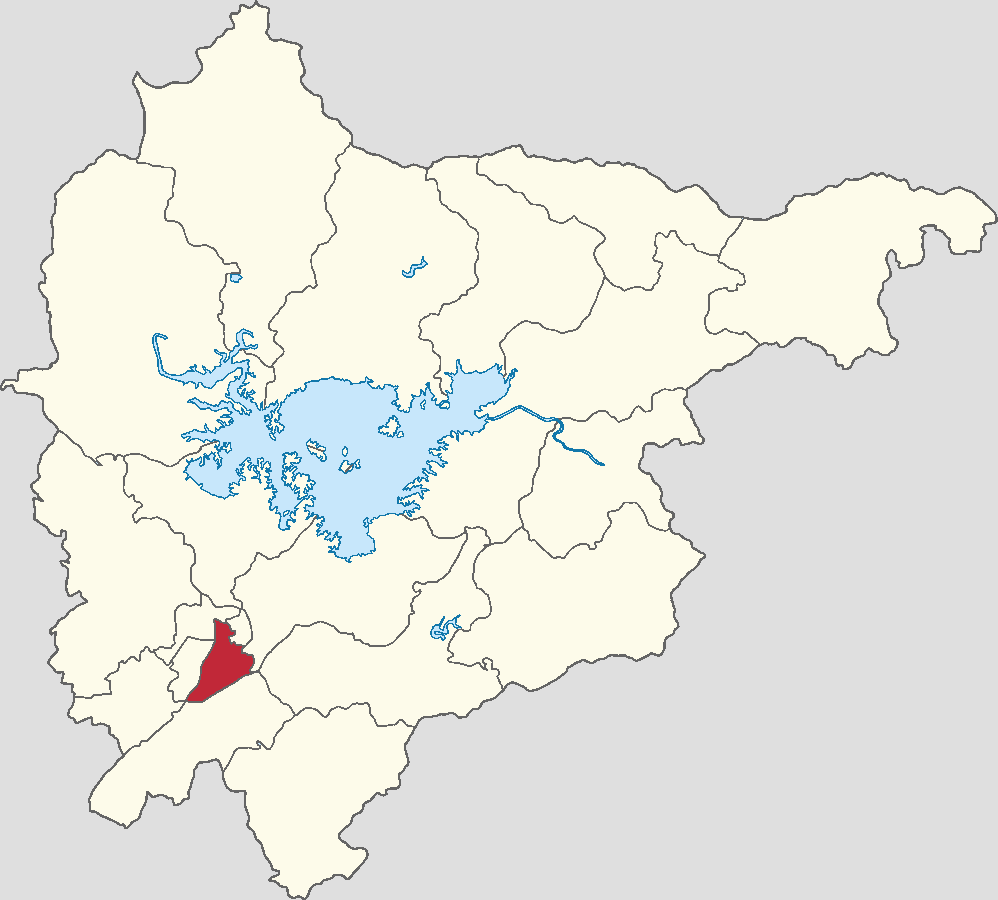
- Location in Miyun District

- Location within Beijing Location within China
- Coordinates: 40°22′02″N 116°50′02″E
- Country: China
- Municipality: Beijing
- District: Miyun
- Village-level Divisions: 29 communities

Area
  - Total: 13.04 km^{2} (5.03 sq mi)
- Elevation: 70 m (230 ft)

Population (2020)
  - Total: 154,739
  - Density: 11,870/km^{2} (30,730/sq mi)
- Time zone: UTC+8 (China Standard)
- Postal code: 101511
- Area code: 010

Gulou Subdistrict (simplified Chinese: 鼓楼街道; traditional Chinese: 鼓樓街道; pinyin: Gǔlóu Jiēdào) is a subdistrict and the seat of Miyun District of Beijing, China. It borders Miyun Town and Tanying Ethnic Township to its north, Mujiayu Town to its east, Henanzhai Town to its south, and Guoyuan Subdistrict to its west. As of 2020, it had a population of 154,739.

The subdistrict was created in 2005 from part of Miyun Town. Its name Gulou (Chinese: 鼓楼; lit. 'Drum Tower') originates from the Miyun Drum Tower that used to exist within the region.

== Administrative divisions ==
Here is a list of the 29 communities under Gulou Subdistrict as of 2021:

| Administrative Division Codes | Subdivision names | Name transliterations |
|---|---|---|
| 110118001001 | 白檀社区 | Baitansheqv |
| 110118001002 | 鼓楼社区 | Gulousheqv |
| 110118001003 | 鼓楼南区社区 | Gulounanqusheqv |
| 110118001004 | 宾阳里社区 | Binyanglisheqv |
| 110118001005 | 宾阳北里社区 | Binyangbeilisheqv |
| 110118001006 | 宾阳西里社区 | Binyangnanlisheqv |
| 110118001007 | 北源里社区 | Beiyuanlisheqv |
| 110118001008 | 东菜园社区 | Dongcaiyuansheqv |
| 110118001009 | 行宫社区 | Xinggongsheqv |
| 110118001010 | 石桥社区 | Shiqiaosheqv |
| 110118001011 | 沿湖社区 | Yanhusheqv |
| 110118001012 | 车站路社区 | Chezhanlusheqv |
| 110118001013 | 车站路南区社区 | Chezhanlunanqusheqv |
| 110118001014 | 檀州家园社区 | Tanzhoujiayuansheqv |
| 110118001015 | 云秀花园社区 | Yunxiuhuayuansheqv |
| 110118001016 | 宾阳社区 | Binyangsheqv |
| 110118001017 | 太扬家园社区 | Taiyangjiayuansheqv |
| 110118001018 | 行宫南区社区 | Xinggongnanqusheqv |
| 110118001019 | 亚澜湾社区 | Yalanwansheqv |
| 110118001020 | 长安东区社区 | Chang'andongqusheqv |
| 110118001021 | 长安西区社区 | Chang'anxiqusheqv |
| 110118001022 | 檀城东区社区 | Tanchengdongqusheqv |
| 110118001023 | 檀城西区社区 | Tanchengxiqusheqv |
| 110118001024 | 花园东区社区 | Huayuandongqusheqv |
| 110118001025 | 花园西区社区 | Huayuanxiqusheqv |
| 110118001026 | 向阳西区社区 | Xiangyangxiqusheqv |
| 110118001027 | 阳光社区 | Yangguangsheqv |
| 110118001028 | 御东园社区 | Yudongyuansheqv |
| 110118001029 | 云北社区 | Yunbeisheqv |

== Gallery ==
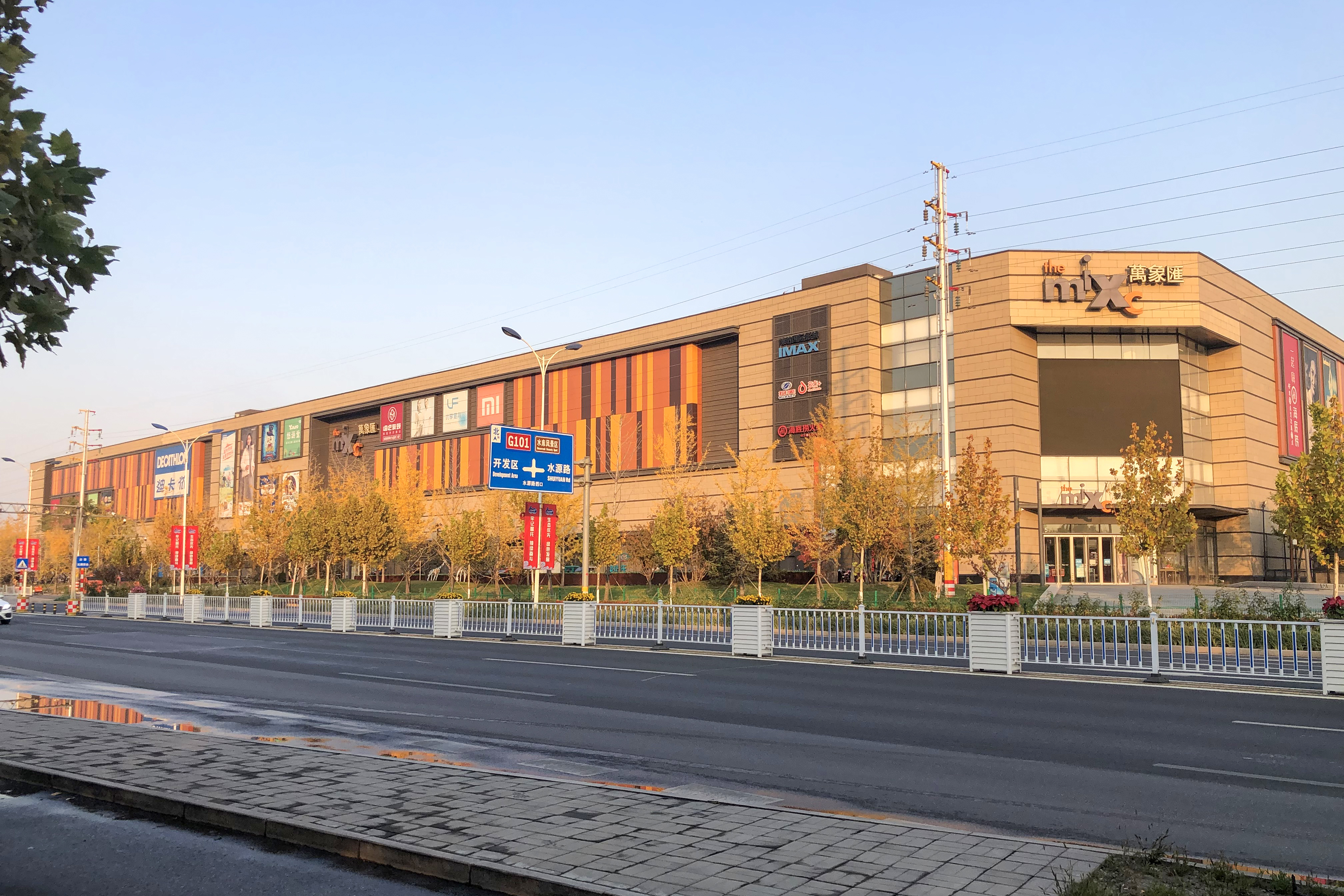
Miyun MIXC on the southwest of the subdistrict, 2020

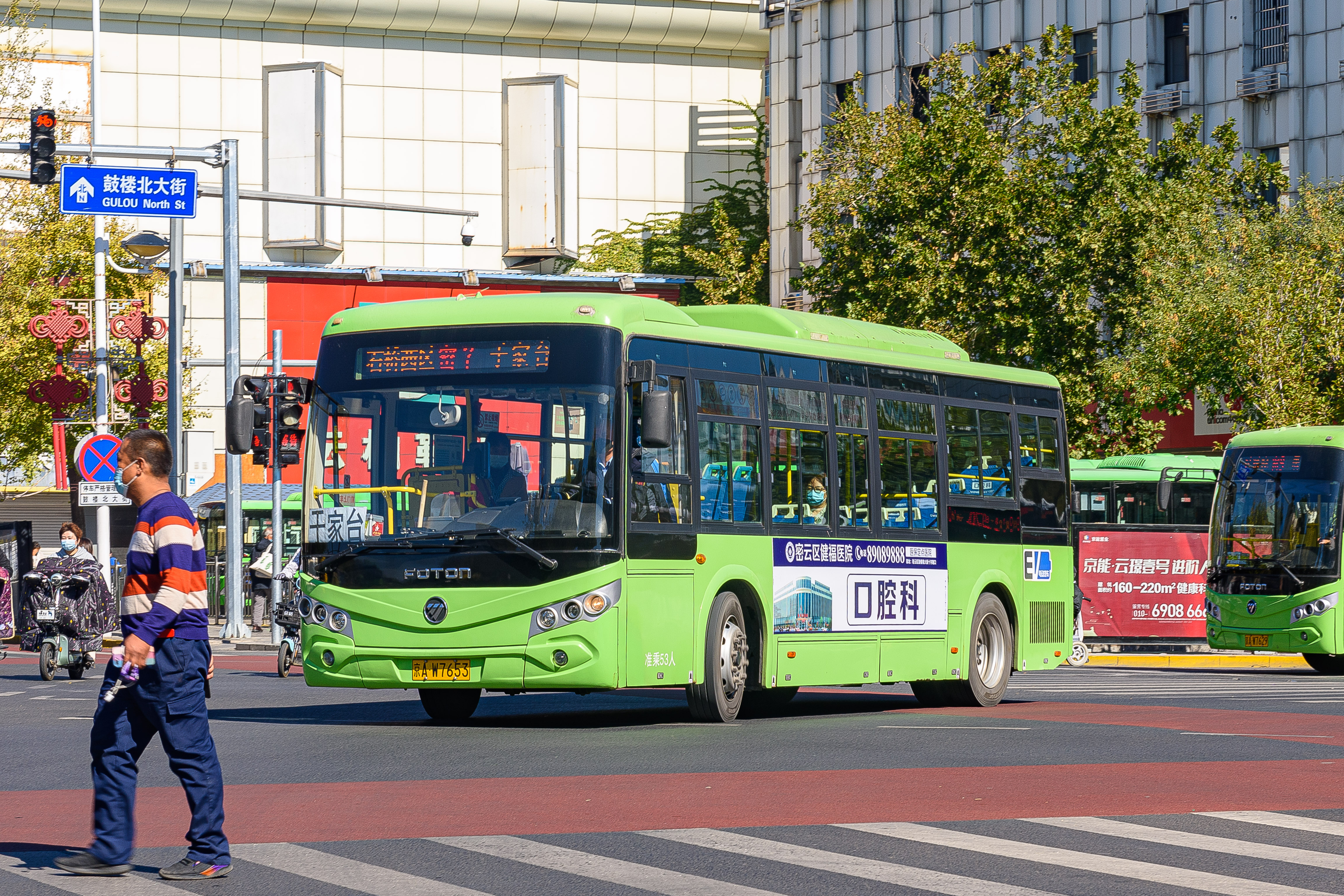
Street corner in Gulou North Street, 2022

== See also ==
- List of township-level divisions of Beijing
