= Tanying =

Tanying Manchu and Mongol Ethnic Township 檀营满族蒙古族乡 (Chinese): ᠲᠠᠨᠶᠢᠩᠮᠠᠨᠵᠤᠮᠣᠩᠭᠣᠯᠰᠢᠶᠠᠩ (Mongolian); ᡨᠠᠨᠶᡳᠩᠮᠠᠨᠵᡠᠮᠣᠩᡤᠣᡠᡴᠰᡠᡵᠠᡳᡥᡳᠶᠠᠩ (Manchu)
- Ethnic Township
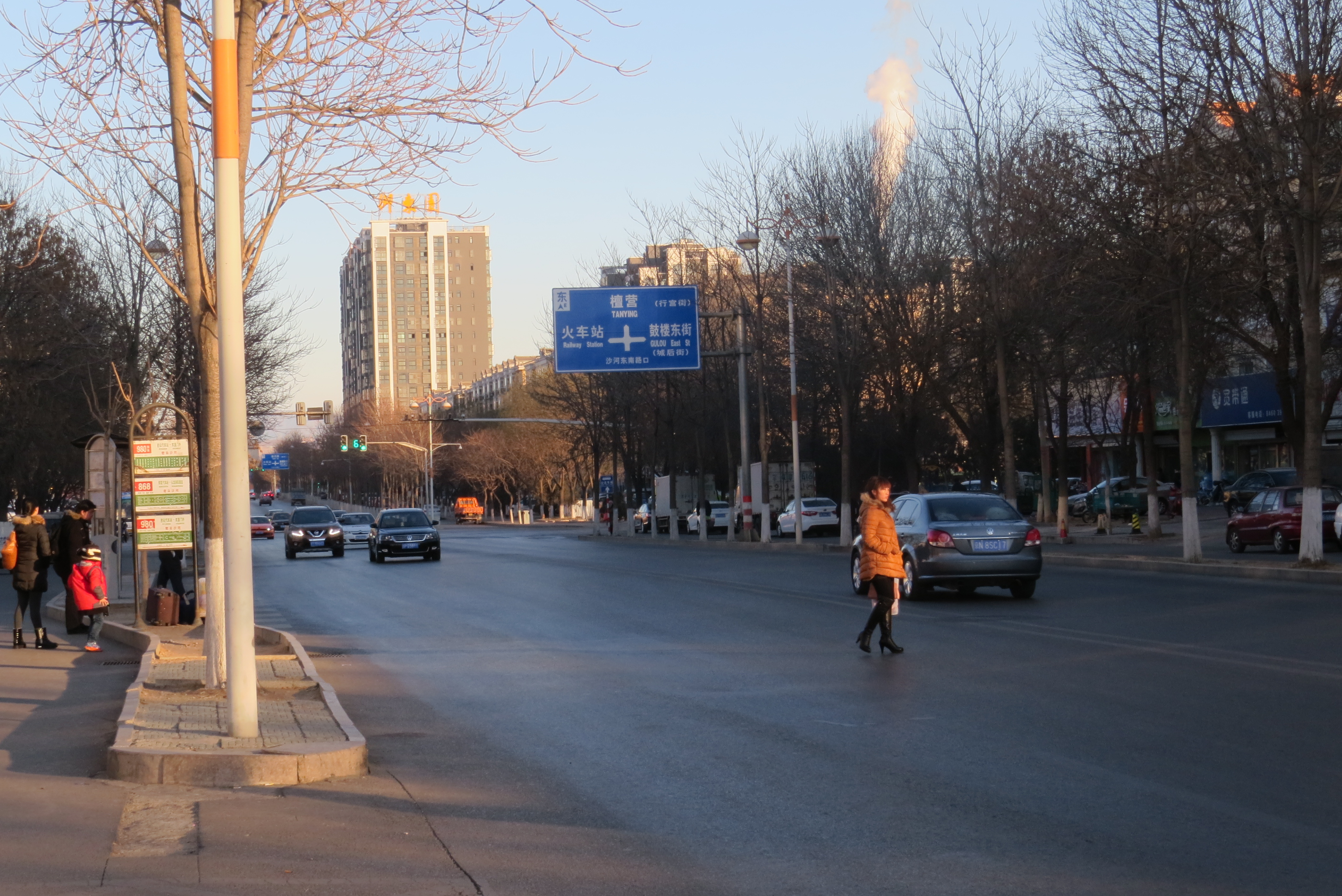
- Xinbei Road within the township, 2015

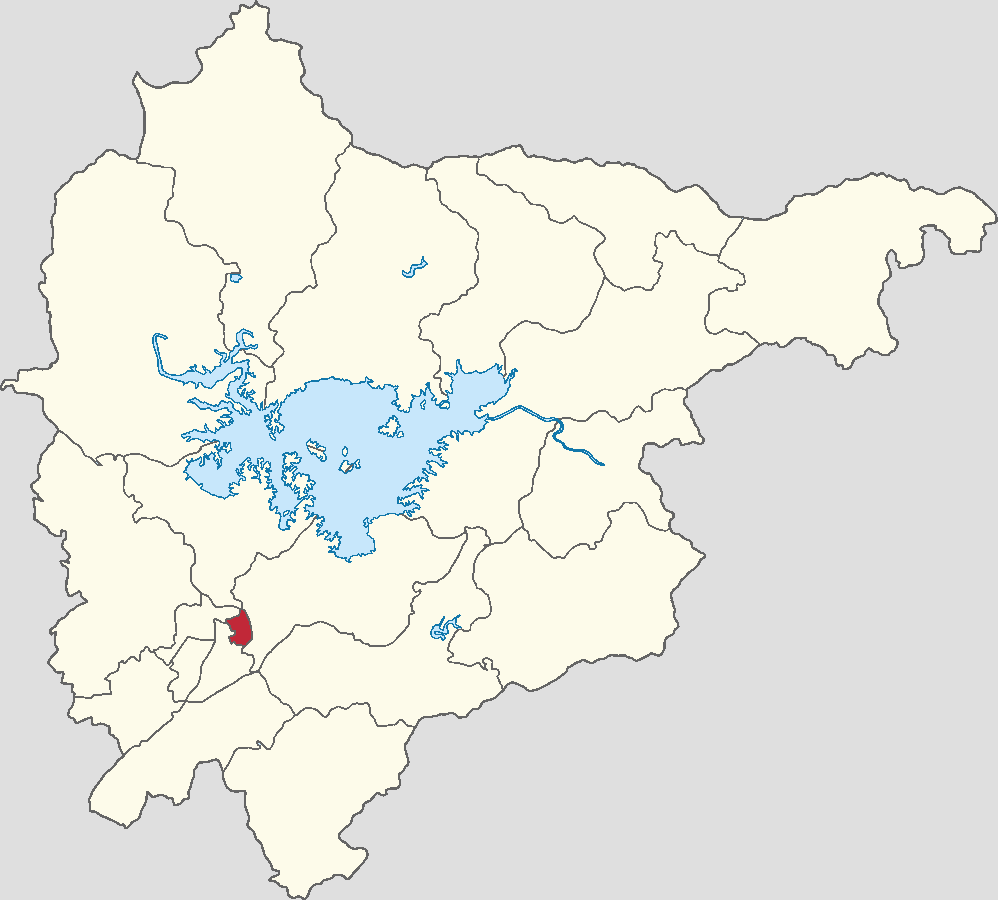
- Location of Tanning Manchu and Mongol Ethnic Township within Miyun District

- Location within Beijing Location within China
- Coordinates: 40°23′22″N 116°51′47″E
- Country: China
- Municipality: Beijing
- District: Miyun
- Village-level Divisions: 3 communities

Area
  - Total: 2.9 km^{2} (1.1 sq mi)
- Elevation: 82 m (269 ft)

Population (2020)
  - Total: 15,466
  - Density: 5,300/km^{2} (14,000/sq mi)
- Time zone: UTC+8 (China Standard)
- Postal code: 101511
- Area code: 010

Tanying Manchu and Mongol Ethnic Township (Chinese: 檀营满族蒙古族乡; pinyin: Tányíng Mǎnzú Měnggǔzú Xiāng Dìqū) is an ethnic township located in the Miyun District of Beijing, China. Located on the south of Ye Mountain (冶山), it shares border with Mujiayu Town in its north and east, Gulou Subdistrict in its southwest, and Miyun Town in its northwest. In 2020, the area had 15,466 inhabitants under its administration.

The name Tanying (Chinese: 檀营; lit. 'Tan Barrack') originates in 1777, when the region, which was called Tan Department (檀州) at the time, was used as a garrison for stationing Eight Banners troops.

== History ==
History of Tanying Manchu and Mongol Ethnic Township
Year	Status	Under
1953 - 1958	Tanying Township	Miyun County, Hebei
1958 - 1965	Administered by Chengguan People's Commune	Miyun County, Beijing
1965 - 1987	Administered by Mujiayu People's Commune	Miyun County, Beijing
1987 - 2005	Tanying Manchu and Mongol Ethnic Township	Miyun County, Beijing
2005 - 2015	Tanying Area (Manchu and Mongol Ethnic Township)	Miyun County, Beijing
2015–present	Tanying Area (Manchu and Mongol Ethnic Township)	Miyun District, Beijing

== Administrative divisions ==
In 2021, Tanying Manchu and Mongol Ethnic Townshipis formed from 3 residential communities, and they are organized in the following table:

Administrative Division Code	Subdivision names	Name transliterations
110118003001	檀营社区	Tanyingsheqv
110118003002	第一社区	Diyisheqv
110118003003	第二社区	Di'ersheqv

== Gallery ==
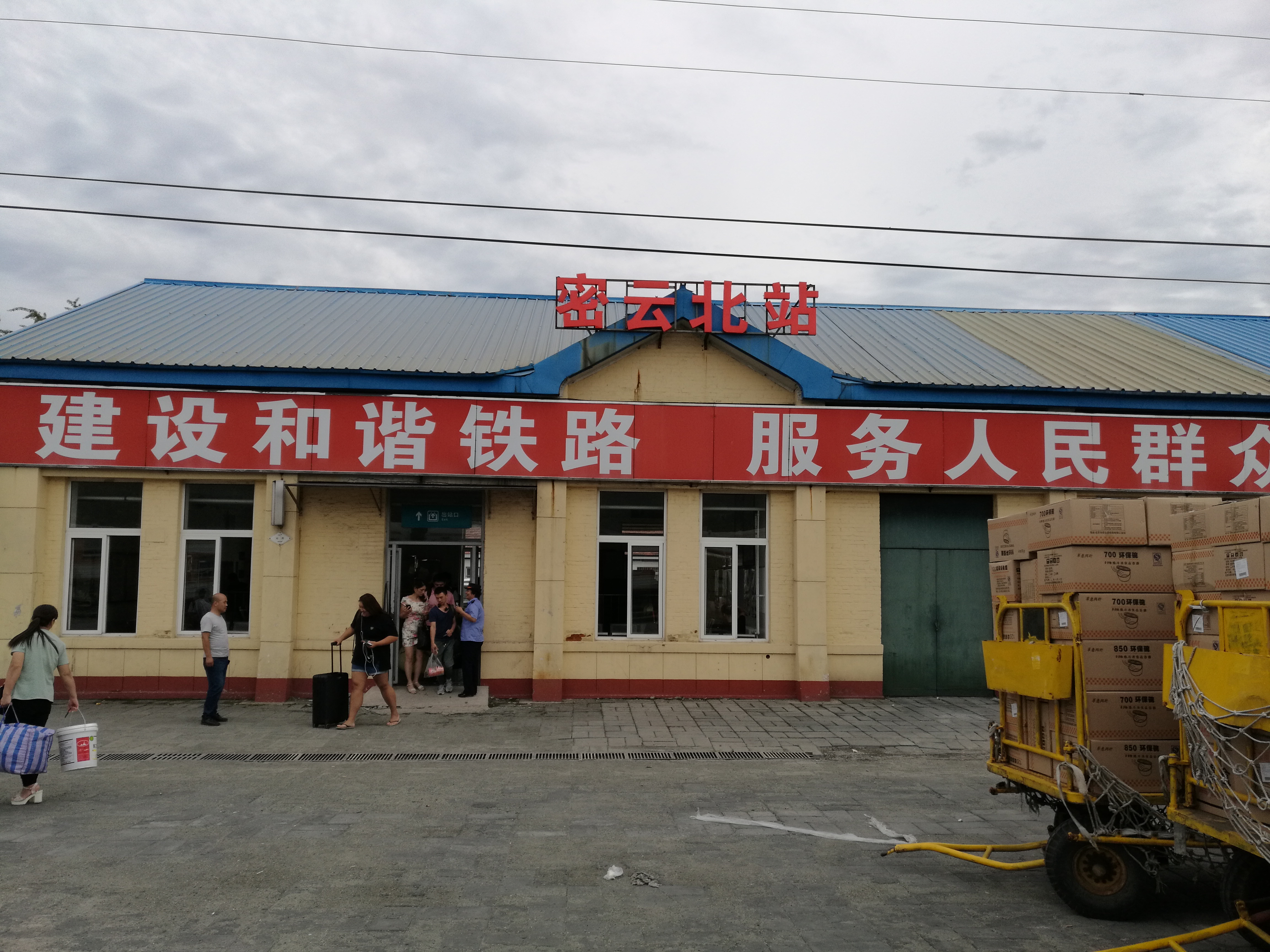
Entrance of Miyunbei Railway Station on the west of the area, 2016

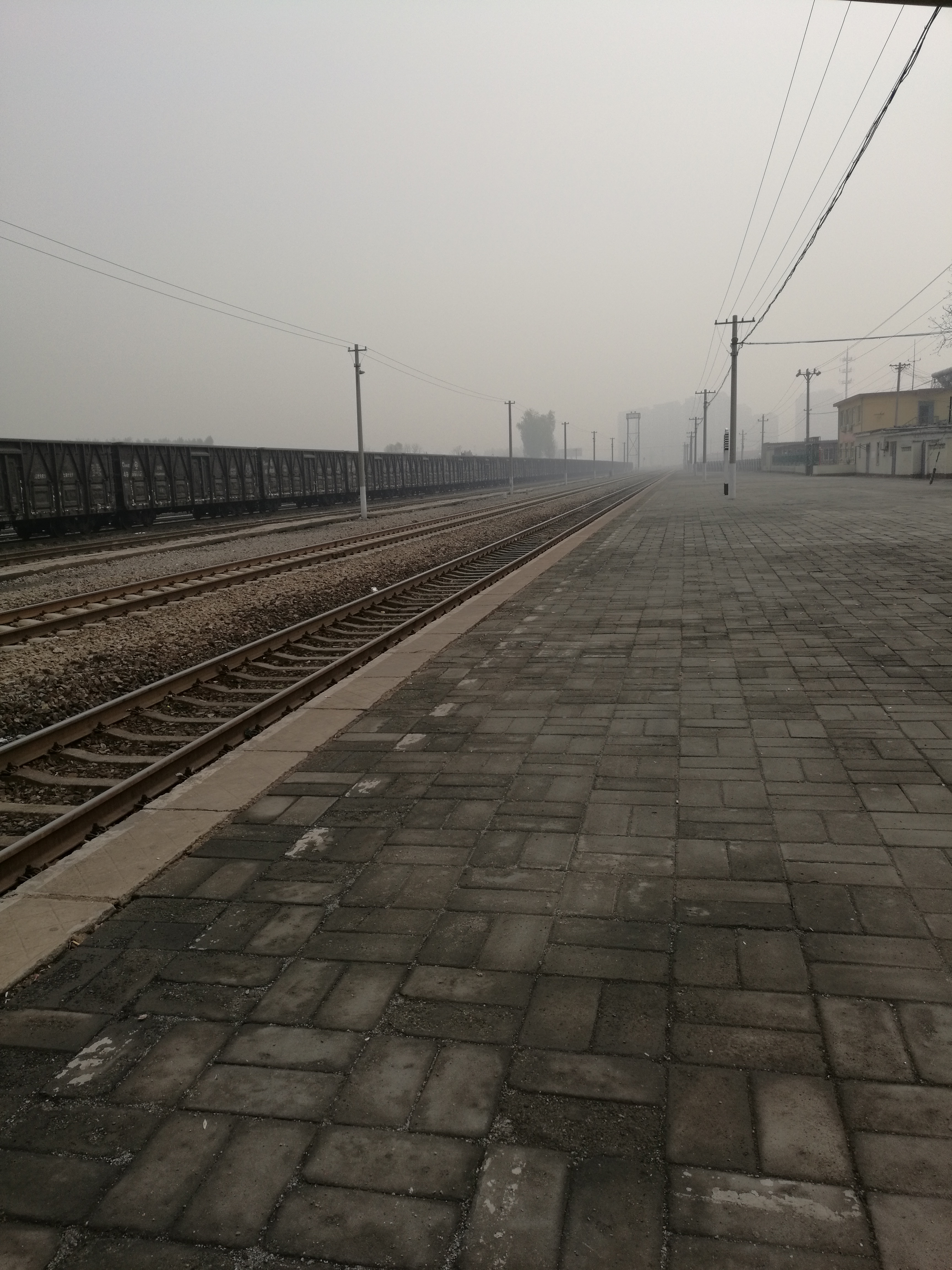
Rail tracks within Miyunbei Railway Station, 2016

== See also ==
- List of township-level divisions of Beijing
