= China Agri-Industries Holdings =

Chinese processed agricultural products company

China Agri-Industries Holdings Limited
- Native name: 中国粮油控股有限公司
- Type: Private
- Industry: Agricultural products
- Founded: 2006
- Headquarters: Beijing, China
- Area served: China
- Key people: Chi Jingtao (迟京涛) (Chairman)
- Parent: COFCO Group
- Website: China Agri-Industries Holdings Limited

China Agri-Industries Holdings Limited (simplified Chinese: 中国粮油控股有限公司; traditional Chinese: 中國糧油控股有限公司) is a leading producer and supplier of processed agricultural products (including oilseed, wheat and rice) in Mainland China. Its service categories are biofuel and biochemical, oilseed processing, rice trading and processing, brewing materials, and wheat processing. Its chairman is Chi Jingtao.

It was split from COFCO International Limited (Now China Foods Limited) and listed in the Hong Kong Stock Exchange on 21 March 2007. Since 10 September 2007, it has been added to be a member of Hang Seng China-Affiliated Corporations Index Constitute Stock (Red chip).

== Divisions ==
China Agri-Industries Holdings has five operating divisions with total revenues in 2010 of HK$53.49 billion and profit of HK$1.283 billion. In order of relative size, the divisions include oilseed processing, biofuels and biochemical, rice trading and processing, wheat processing and brewing materials. Oilseed processing comprised nearly two-thirds of total revenue for the first half of 2011. China Agri-Industries Holdings is China's leading fuel ethanol producer. Its facilities include the first and only non-grain-based fuel ethanol producer in China, using tapioca as raw material.

== See also ==
- Bioenergy in China
