= Lan (agrotown) =

Agrotown in Minsk region, Belarus

Coordinates: 53°8′56″N 26°41′5″E

Lan (Belarusian: Лань) is an agrotown in Nyasvizh district, Minsk region, Belarus. It is the center of the Lan rural council.
