= Lan =

Lan or LAN may refer to:

== Science and technology ==
- Local asymptotic normality, a fundamental property of regular models in statistics
- Longitude of the ascending node, one of the orbital elements used to specify the orbit of an object in space
- Łan, unit of measurement in Poland
- Local area network, a computer network that interconnects within a limited area such as one or more buildings
- Lan blood group system, a human blood group
- Lanthanum nitride, a chemical compound whose formula is LaN

== Places ==
- Lan County, Shanxi, China
- Łan, Lublin Voivodeship, Poland
- Lan (agrotown), agrotown in Nyasvizh district, Minsk region, Belarus
- Lan (river), Belarus
- Llan (placename), a placename element known in Breton as lan
- LAN
  - Chapman code of Lancashire, England
  - National Rail station code of Lancaster railway station, England
  - IATA airport code of Capital Region International Airport, Lansing, Michigan, US

== Airlines ==
- LAN Airlines, former name of LATAM Chile, an airline in Chile, with a stake in other airlines:
  - LAN Peru, an airline based in Peru
  - LAN Ecuador, an airline based in Quito, Ecuador
  - LAN Argentina, a defunct Argentine airline
  - LAN Dominicana, a defunct Dominican airline
  - LAN Colombia, an airline based in Bogotá, Colombia

== People ==
- Lan (surname 蓝), a Chinese surname
- Lan (surname 兰), a Chinese surname
- Lan (given name), a given name (including a list of people with the name)
- Lan (tribe), ethnic group in Han dynasty China
- David Lan (born 1952), South African-born British playwright
- Donald Lan (1930–2019), American politician
- Phạm Chi Lan, Vietnamese economist

== Fictional characters ==
- Lan, Aeon of The Hunt in Honkai: Star Rail
- Lan Mandragoran, a fictional character from Robert Jordan's The Wheel of Time series
- Lan Hikari, protagonist of the Mega Man: Battle Network series of video games and animated television shows

== Other uses ==
- Lan (film), a 2009 Chinese film
- Län, administrative division used in Sweden and until 2009 in Finland
- Lan (tribe), a tribe of Eastern Huns
- Lan, a Cantonese profanity
- LAN or Lockwood, Andrews & Newnam, an American civil engineering company
- List of storms named Lan

== See also ==
- LAN party, a social happening on a local area network e.g multiplayer games.
- Lans (disambiguation)
- Ian
- Llan (disambiguation)
- ru:Лан
