= COFCO Group =

Chinese state-owned food processing holding company

China Oil and Foodstuffs Corporation

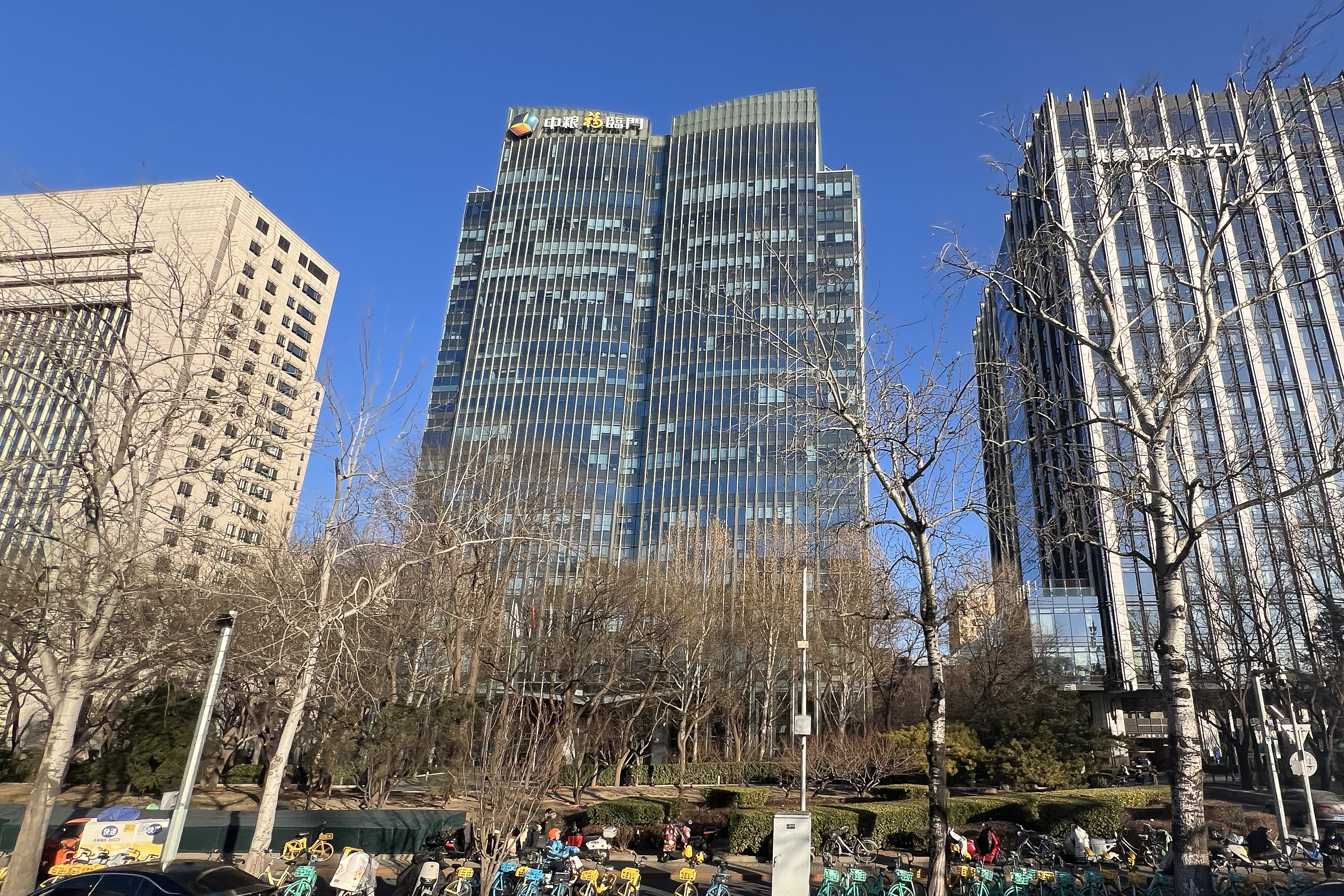
- COFCO Fortune Plaza, the headquarters of COFCO Group
- Native name: 中国粮油食品（集团）有限公司
- Type: State-owned enterprise
- Industry: Food processing
- Founded: 1949
- Headquarters: Chaoyang District, Beijing, China
- Area served: Worldwide
- Key people: Lü Jun (吕军) (Chairman)
- Revenue: $72.149 billion (2020)
- Total assets: $85.847 billion (2020)
- Total equity: $12.499 billion (2020)
- Number of employees: 110,896 (2020)
- Subsidiaries: China Foods Limited; China Agri-Industries Holdings Limited

Chinese name
- Simplified Chinese: 中国粮油食品（集团）有限公司
- Traditional Chinese: 中國糧油食品（集團）有限公司
Transcriptions
Standard Mandarin
- Hanyu Pinyin: Zhōngguó Liángyóu Shípǐn Jítuán Yǒuxiàngōngsī

COFCO
- Simplified Chinese: 中粮
- Traditional Chinese: 中糧
Transcriptions
Standard Mandarin
- Hanyu Pinyin: Zhōng Liáng
- Website: www.cofco.com/en/ (in English)

China Oil and Foodstuffs Corporation (Chinese: 中国粮油食品（集团）有限公司), commonly known as COFCO (Chinese: 中粮), is a Chinese state-owned food processing holding company. COFCO Group is China's largest food processor, manufacturer and trader. It is also one of Asia's leading agribusiness groups alongside Wilmar International.

Its headquarters are in the COFCO Fortune Plaza (中粮福临门大厦) in Chaoyang District, Beijing.

== Background ==
Founded in 1949, it is one of the largest SOEs of those under the direct supervision of the SASAC. Between 1952 and 1987, it was the sole agricultural products importer and exporter operating under direct control of the central government. In 2007, COFCO had just over 60,000 employees in multiple locations in China as well as overseas operations in countries such as Japan, US, UK, Australia and Canada.

Besides the foodstuff business, COFCO has developed into a diversified conglomerate, involving planting, cultivation, food-processing, finance, warehouse, transportation, port facilities, hotels and real estate. It is one of the top 500 enterprises chosen by US's Fortune Magazine.

COFCO has four companies listed in Hong Kong, namely, China Foods (SEHK: 506), China Agri-Industries Holdings (SEHK: 606), Mengniu Dairy (SEHK: 2319), and COFCO Packaging Holdings (SEHK: 906) and three companies listed in mainland China, namely, COFCO Tunhe (SSE: 600737), COFCO Property (SZSE: 000031), and BBCA (SZSE: 000930). COFCO boasts a wide range of branded products and service portfolios, such as Fortune edible oil, Great Wall wine, Mengniu dairy, Lohas fruit and vegetable juice, Le Conte chocolate, Tunhe tomato products, Joycome meat products, Joy City shopping mall, Yalong Bay resorts, Gloria hotels, Snow-Lotus cashmere, Zhongcha tea products, COFCO-Aviva Life Insurance, COFCO Trust, etc.

== Subsidiaries ==
- China Foods Limited, a listed subsidiary of the COFCO Group
- China Agri-Industries Holdings Limited, a listed subsidiary of COFCO Group
- COFCO Oils & Oilseeds: a subsidiary of COFCO Group
- COFCO Wines & Spirits: a subsidiary of COFCO Group that specializes in the alcohol business
- COFCO Coca-Cola: A joint venture between COFCO and The Coca-Cola Company to manufacture and distribute Coca-Cola branded products in 19 provinces and municipalities in China.
- China Tea Co., Ltd.
- Chinatex Corporation
- COFCO Engineering Equipment (Zhangjiakou) Co., Ltd.

== Equity investments ==
- UBS Securities (14%)
- Mengniu Dairy (31.25%) as of December 2019
