= Boutigny-sur-Essonne =

Commune in Île-de-France, France

- Commune
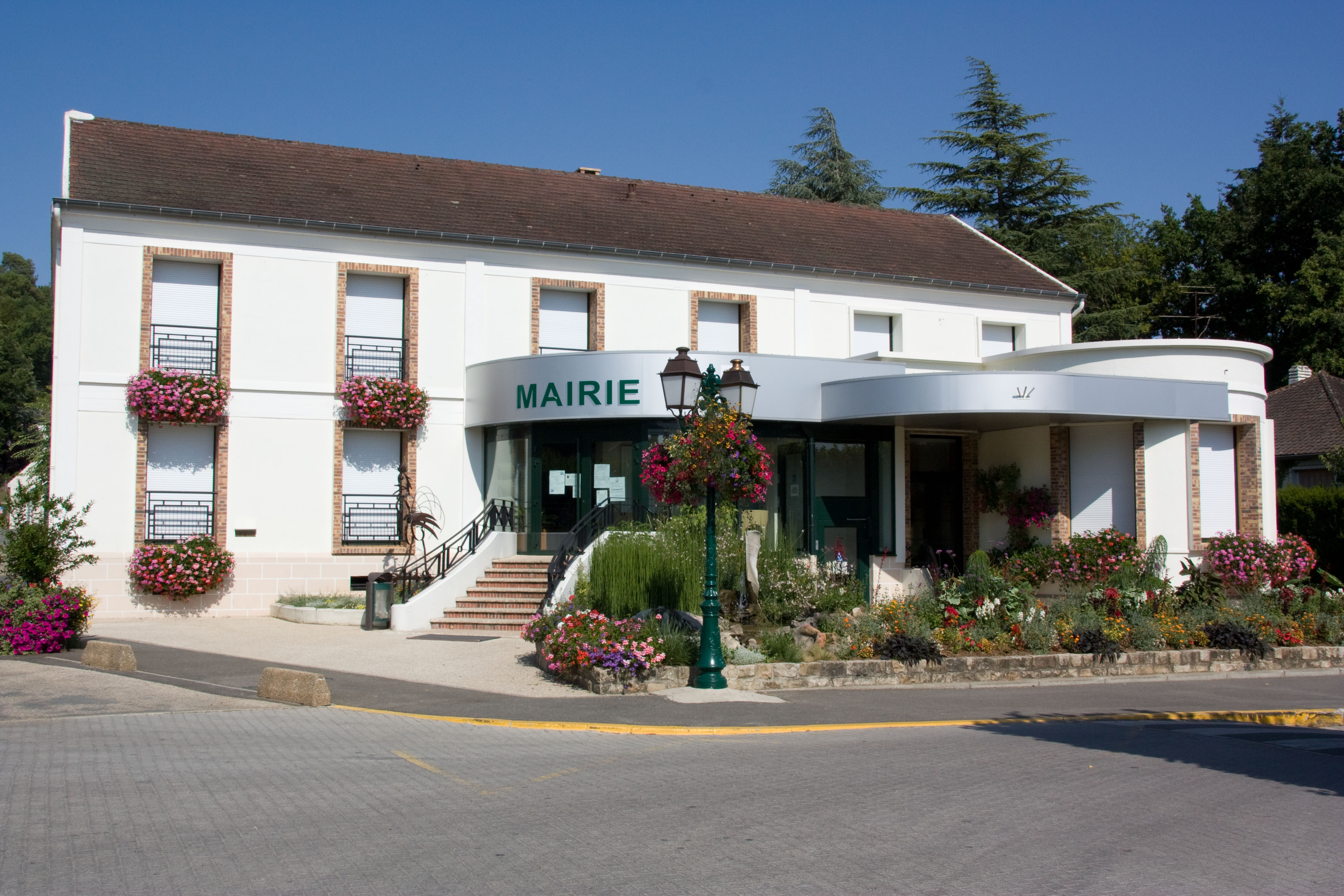
- The town hall of Boutigny-sur-Essonne

- Coat of arms
- Location of Boutigny-sur-Essonne
- Location within France Location within Île-de-France (region)
- Coordinates: 48°26′15″N 2°22′51″E
- Country: France
- Region: Île-de-France
- Department: Essonne
- Arrondissement: Étampes
- Canton: Mennecy
- Intercommunality: CC des 2 Vallées

Government
  - Mayor (2020–2026): Patricia Bergdolt
- Area^{1}: 16.20 km^{2} (6.25 sq mi)
- Elevation: 60 m (200 ft)
- Highest elevation: 147 m (482 ft)
- Lowest elevation: 57 m (187 ft)
- Population (2023): 3,146
  - Density: 194.2/km^{2} (503.0/sq mi)
- Demonym: Botignacois
- Time zone: UTC+01:00 (CET)
  - Summer (DST): UTC+02:00 (CEST)
- INSEE/Postal code: 91099 /91820
- Website: www.boutignysuressonne.fr
- ^{1} French Land Register data, which excludes lakes, ponds, glaciers > 1 km^{2} (0.386 sq mi or 247 acres) and river estuaries.

Boutigny-sur-Essonne (French pronunciation: [butiɲi syʁ ɛsɔn]; lit. 'Boutigny-on-Essonne') is a commune in the Essonne department in Île-de-France in northern France.

The nearby villages are La Ferté-Alais (aerodrome of Cerny – Jean Baptiste Salis: Annual international meeting) and Milly-la-Forêt (house of Jean Cocteau, historical village).

To see in Boutigny: the golf course of Belesbat and its 17th-century-old castle, cressonières, edges of the Essonne.

Boutigny-sur-Essonne is twinned with Lans, Austria, since April 23, 1961.

== Geography ==
It is located 47 kilometers south-east of Paris, between Étampes and Corbeil-Essonnes. It is 23 kilometers south west of Évry, 16 kilometers east of Étampes, 6 kilometers south of La Ferté-Alais, 8 kilometers north west of Milly-la-Forêt, 20 kilometers south east of Arpajon, 21 kilometers south west of Corbeil-Essonnes, 24 kilometers south east of Montlhéry, 29 kilometers south east of Dourdan, 32 kilometers south east of Palaiseau. It is also located 67 kilometers away south west of its homonym Boutigny and Seine-et-Marne and 68 kilometers south east of Boutigny-Prouais in Eure-et-Loir department.

== Population ==
Historical population
| Year | Pop. | ±% p.a. |
|---|---|---|
| 1968 | 1,054 | — |
| 1975 | 1,515 | +5.32% |
| 1982 | 1,979 | +3.89% |
| 1990 | 2,556 | +3.25% |
| 1999 | 3,002 | +1.80% |
| 2007 | 3,085 | +0.34% |
| 2012 | 3,020 | −0.42% |
| 2017 | 2,998 | −0.15% |
| 2023 | 3,146 | +0.81% |
Source: INSEE

Inhabitants of Boutigny-sur-Essonne are known as Botignacois in French.

== Environmental heritage ==
- Decorated cave of Malabry
- Boutigny-sur-Essonne was awarded by three flowers during the most flowered village and city competition. Water banks of Essonne and the woods surrounding the village have been listed to sensitive natural space by the conseil général de l'Essonne.

== Transport ==
Boutigny-sur-Essonne is accessible by suburban train: the RER D, direction Malesherbes, Boutigny station.

== See also ==
- Communes of the Essonne department
