= Miyun Town =

Miyun Town 密云镇
- Town
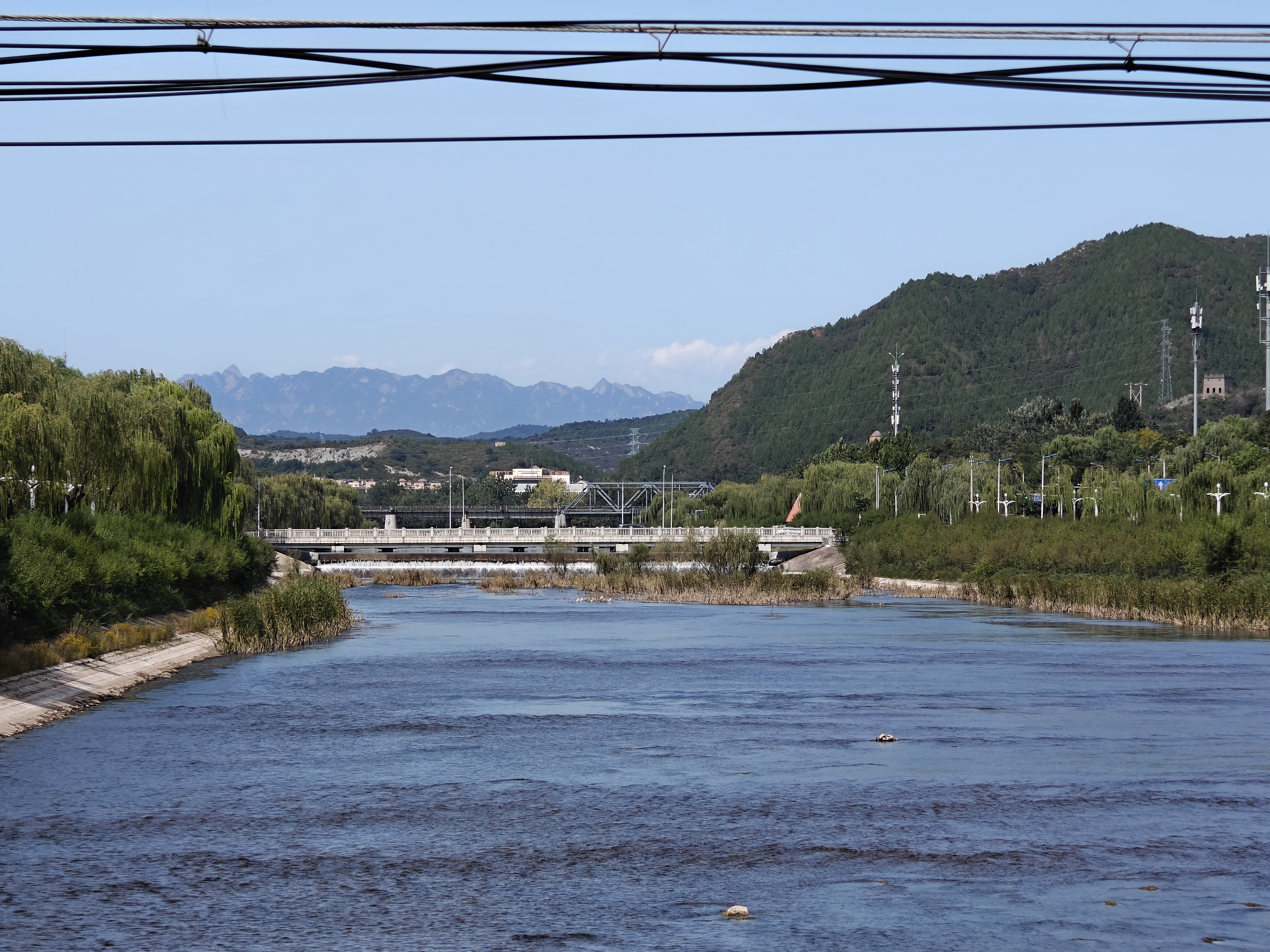
- Bai River in Miyun Town, 2025

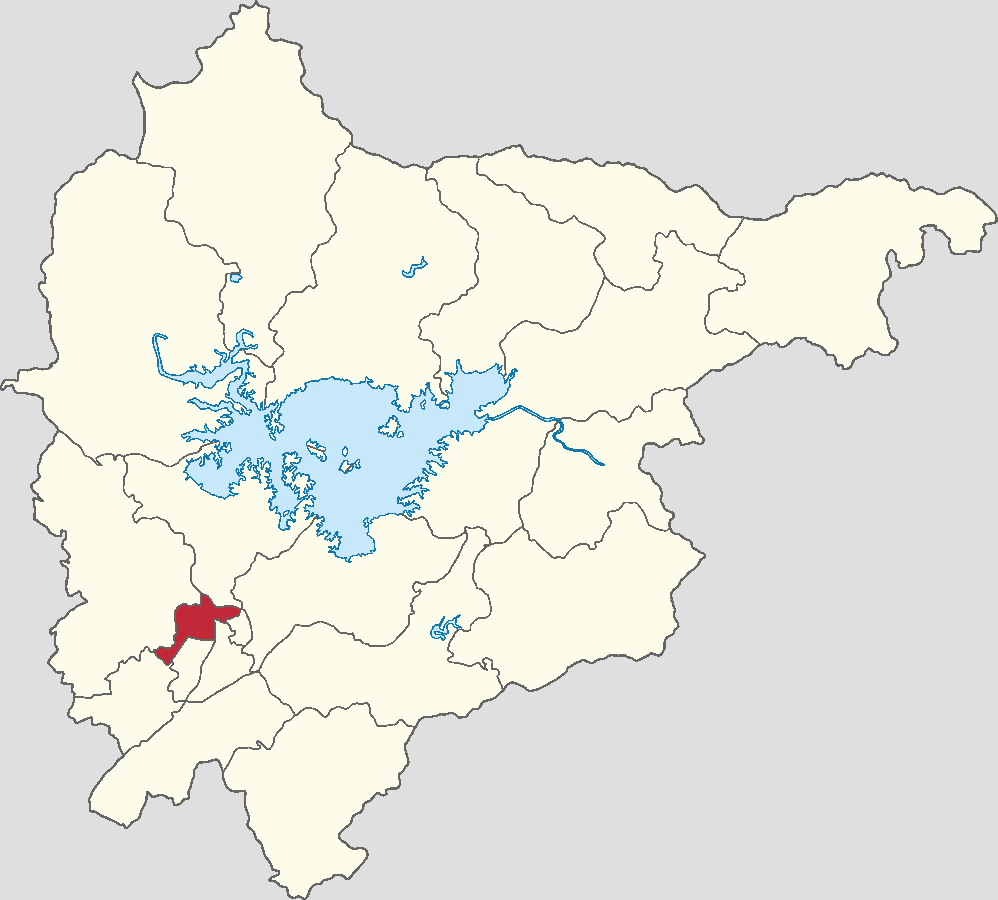
- Location of Miyun Town within Miyun District

- Location within Beijing Location within China
- Coordinates: 40°22′01″N 116°50′03″E
- Country: China
- Municipality: Beijing
- District: Miyun
- Village-level Divisions: 6 villages

Area
  - Total: 12.76 km^{2} (4.93 sq mi)
- Elevation: 71 m (233 ft)

Population (2020)
  - Total: 20,392
  - Density: 1,598/km^{2} (4,139/sq mi)
- Time zone: UTC+8 (China Standard)
- Postal code: 101509
- Area code: 010

Miyun Town (simplified Chinese: 密云镇; traditional Chinese: 密雲鎮; pinyin: Mìyún Zhèn) is a town in Miyun District, Beijing, China. Situated near the Bai River, It borders Xiwengzhuang Town to its north, Tanying Ethnic Township and Gulou Subdistrict to its east, Guoyuan Subdistrict and Shilipu Town to its south, and Xitiangezhuang Town to its west. In 2020, the census counted 20,392 residents for this town.

The name Miyun (Chinese: 密云; lit. 'Dense Cloud') is referring to the collection of tall mountains located at the south of the town, where clouds can be seen gathering around the mountain tops.

== History ==
Timetable of Miyun Town
Year	Status	Part of
1947 - 1950	6th District	Yihua County, Beijing
1950 - 1953	Chengguan District	Miyun County, Hebei
1953 - 1958	Chengguan Town	Miyun County, Hebei
1958 - 1983	Chengguan People's Commune	Miyun County, Beijing
1983 - 1987	Chengguan Township	Miyun County, Beijing
1987 - 1990	Chengguan Town	Miyun County, Beijing
1990 - 2015	Miyun Town (Southeastern parts were separated and formed Gulou and Guoyuan Subdistricts in 2005)	Miyun County, Beijing
2015–present	Miyun Town (Southeastern parts were separated and formed Gulou and Guoyuan Subdistricts in 2005)	Miyun District, Beijing

== Subdivisions ==
As of 2021, Miyun Town is made up of 6 core villages Datangzhuang (大唐庄)110118101201 (Village) & 110118101002 (Community), Jizhuang (季庄)110118101204 (Village) & 110118101001 (Community), Ligezhuang (李各庄)110118101209 (Village), Xihubuzhuang (西户部庄)110118101208 (Village)，Tangzhuang (唐庄)110118101202 (Xiao Tangzhuang) & 110118101203 (Guojialan) & Liyuan (栗园)110118101206 (Houliyuan) & 110118101207 (Qianliyuan) :

Administrative Division Codes	Subdivision names	Name transliterations
110118100001	季庄社区	Jizhuangsheqv
110118100002	大唐庄社区	Datangzhuangsheqv
110118100201	大唐庄村	Datangzhuangcun
110118100202	唐庄村	Tangzhuangcun
110118100203	郭家澜村	Guojialancun
110118100204	季庄村	Jizhuangcun
110118100205	大营村	Dayingcun
110118100206	后栗园村	Houliyuancun
110118100207	前栗园村	Qianliyuancun
110118100208	西户部庄村	Xihubuzhuangcun
110118100209	李各庄村	Limingzhuangcun
110118100210	小善河村	Xiaoshanhecun

== See also ==
- List of township-level divisions of Beijing
- Gulou Subdistrict, the district seat of Miyun District
