= Phạm Chi Lan =

Vietnamese economist

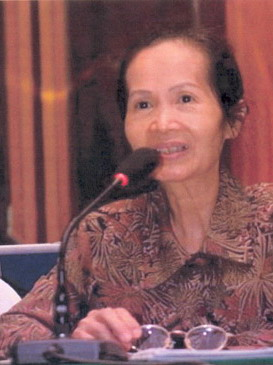
Phạm Chi Lan

Phạm Chi Lan is a Vietnamese economist. She specialises in economic policy reforms and Vietnam's international integration process.

== Biography ==
Lan graduated from the Foreign Trade University in Hanoi, Vietnam in 1966. She started her career working at the Vietnam Chamber of Commerce and Industry, and held a variety of rolese there until her retirement in 2003: Head of International Relations Department (1983-1989), Deputy Secretary General (1989-1993), Secretary General (1993-1997), Executive Vice President (1997-2003).

From 1996 to 2006 Lan served as an advisor to the Prime Ministers of Vietnam as part of the Prime Minister's Research Commission.

=== Recognition ===
In 1999, Lam received a certificate of merit from the Prime Minister of Vietnam. In 2003, she received a Labour Medal from the President of Vietnam, in recognition of her contribution to the country's economic development. She has also received awards from the Minister of Justice, Minister of Trade and the chair of the Office of the Government for her contribution to the development of legal infrastructure and trade policy.
