= Lan Yu (fashion designer) =

Chinese fashion designer

- Born: Lan Yu
- Occupations: dressmaker; fashion designer
- Known for: Haute couture Evening Gown (worn by Miss China); Su Xiu (Suzhou embroidery); Bridal design
- Label: LAN-YU

Lan Yu (Chinese: 兰玉; pinyin: Lán Yù, born January 21, 1986) is a Chinese fashion designer based in Beijing, China. Lan Yu is one of China's new generation of designers and is regarded as one of Asia's most influential designers. Her design aspect is combining traditional Chinese Suzhou embroidery with haute couture. She uses her designs as tools to introduce oriental culture to the world.

She is also the first Chinese designer that was invited to Paris Haute Couture Fashion Week in 2014. In 2016, she was invited to New York Fashion Week to launch her first ready-to-wear collection. She launches 2 haute couture collections and 2 ready-to-wear collections each year. Lan Yu is named “The Chinese Queen of Couture Wedding Dresses” by Chinese media.

== Early life ==
Lan Yu was born in a hundred-year Suzhou embroidery family. She is the fifth generation descendant of her family. Her mother taught her embroidery skills in her young age. She is also talented on learning making couture dresses. Lan Yu is good at integrating Chinese traditional embroidery with western advanced materials in her designs. Her collections represent the elegant oriental beauty with modern western design perspectives.

== Education ==
She entered the Beijing Institute of Clothing Technology in 2004, and graduated in 2008. That same year she entered New York’s Fashion Institute of Technology. In 2012 she was awarded an Executive Master of Business Administration (EMBA) degree by the China Europe International Business School (CEIBS).

== Style ==
The design approach of Lan Yu is based on the relationship between spiritual and visual narratives.

== Career ==
In 2005, she founded LANYU Studio in Beijing. In 2008, Lan Yu Studios was acquired by Chinatex Corporation with Lan remaining as Creative Director while studying in New York. Lan returned to China in 2009 and in September of that year retook control and ownership of Lan Yu Studios. Lan's designs balance Chinese embroidery techniques with Western structural designs. Her designs exhibit a knowledge of Su Xiu, a form of traditional Chinese embroidery handed down through three generations of her family, as well as formal studies in Western couture design to produce a style that integrates elements from both cultures. Her pieces are regularly featured on celebrity clients at Cannes, Venice, Tokyo and Berlin Film Festival, as well as China's film festivals and other red carpet events.

== Awards and nominations ==
- 2006, 'Best Minority Style Evening Wear'.
- 2009, voted as one of 'China's Top 10 Designers' by the China Designers Association as well as the 'Designer with the Highest Media Attention'.
- 2012, voted as the 'Designer with the Highest Media Attention' and 'Asia's Most Influential Designer
- 2013, MSN awarded Lan Yu with 'China's Most Influential Designer'. In the same year she was also awarded 'The Star's Favourite Designer' by COSMOBride China.
- 2014, Lan Yu was listed in Forbes China's list of "2014 Forbes China 30 Under 30: Rising Stars Of Entrepreneurism In China"
