= Lans, Tyrol =

Lans
- Municipality
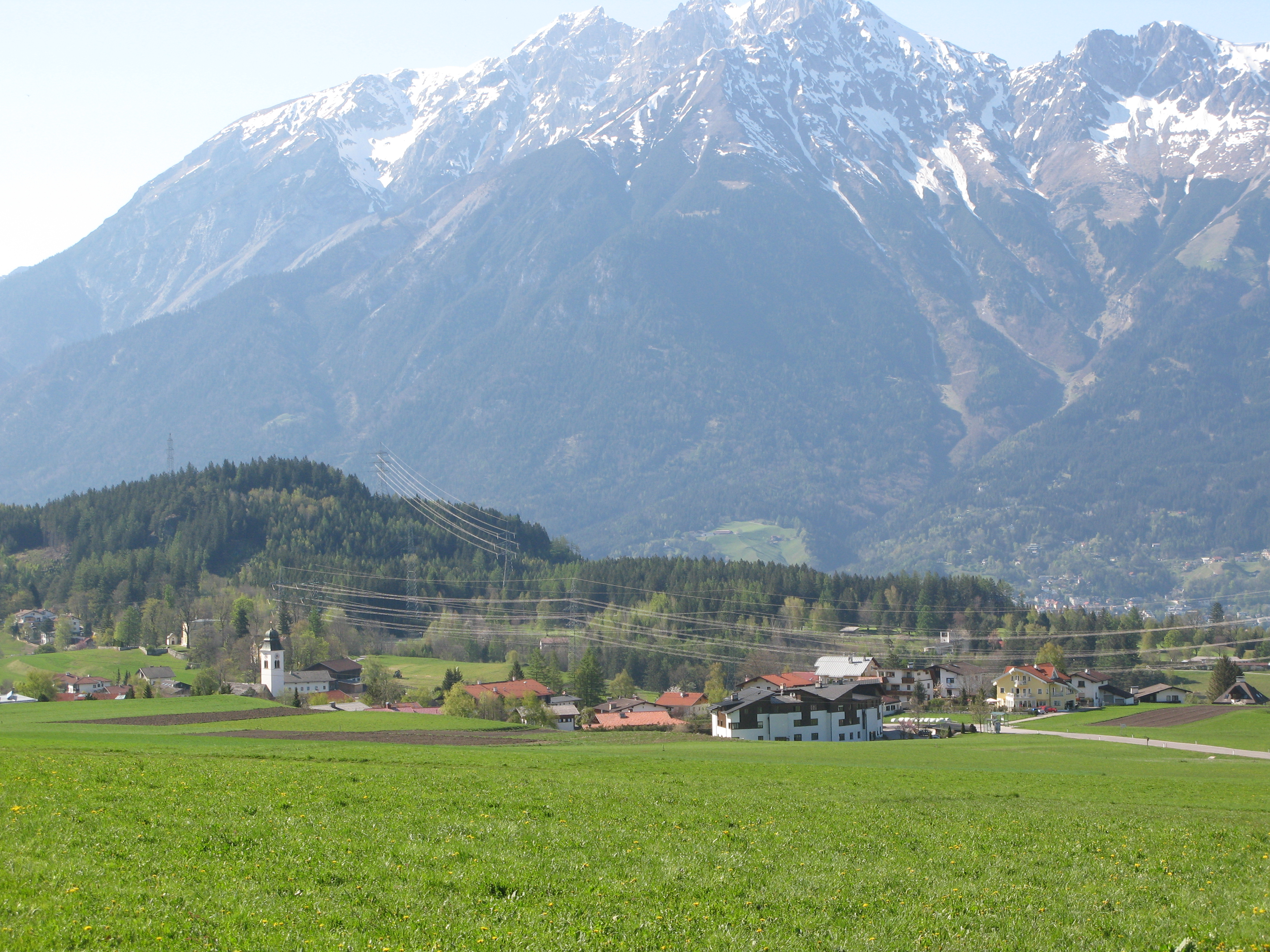
- View of Lans

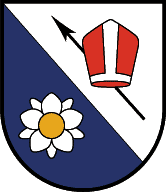
- Coat of arms

- Location within Austria
- Coordinates: 47°14′18″N 11°25′53″E
- Country: Austria
- State: Tyrol
- District: Innsbruck Land

Government
  - Mayor: Dr. Benedikt Erhard

Area
  - Total: 6.29 km^{2} (2.43 sq mi)
- Elevation: 867 m (2,844 ft)

Population (2021)
  - Total: 1,111
  - Density: 177/km^{2} (457/sq mi)
- Time zone: UTC+1 (CET)
  - Summer (DST): UTC+2 (CEST)
- Postal code: 6072
- Area code: 0512
- Vehicle registration: IL
- Website: www.gemeinde-lans.at/

Lans is a town in the district of Innsbruck Land in the Austrian state of Tyrol. The village is located 8 km (15 minutes by car) south of the city of Innsbruck.

Lans is located on the old salt road and was first mentioned in 1180 as "Lannes". The main attractions are the lake Lanser See, several good restaurants and the health center Lanserhof. In summer, the golf resort Sperberegg is an additional attraction.

== Population ==
Historical population
| Year | Pop. | ±% |
|---|---|---|
| 1869 | 256 | — |
| 1880 | 268 | +4.7% |
| 1890 | 245 | −8.6% |
| 1900 | 263 | +7.3% |
| 1910 | 273 | +3.8% |
| 1923 | 329 | +20.5% |
| 1934 | 374 | +13.7% |
| 1939 | 379 | +1.3% |
| 1951 | 646 | +70.4% |
| 1961 | 560 | −13.3% |
| 1971 | 610 | +8.9% |
| 1981 | 646 | +5.9% |
| 1991 | 799 | +23.7% |
| 2001 | 906 | +13.4% |
| 2011 | 918 | +1.3% |

== International relations ==
Lans is twinned with Boutigny-sur-Essonne, France since April 23, 1961.

== Villages and towns in the vicinity ==
Aldrans, Ellbögen, Innsbruck, Patsch, and Sistrans

== Personalities ==
- Erik von Kuehnelt-Leddihn lived and died in Lans.
- Heinrich C. Berann died in Lans
- Christian Berger comes from Lans.
- Hellmut Lantschner

== See also ==
- Lanser Moor
- Mühlsee
