= Chinatex Corporation =

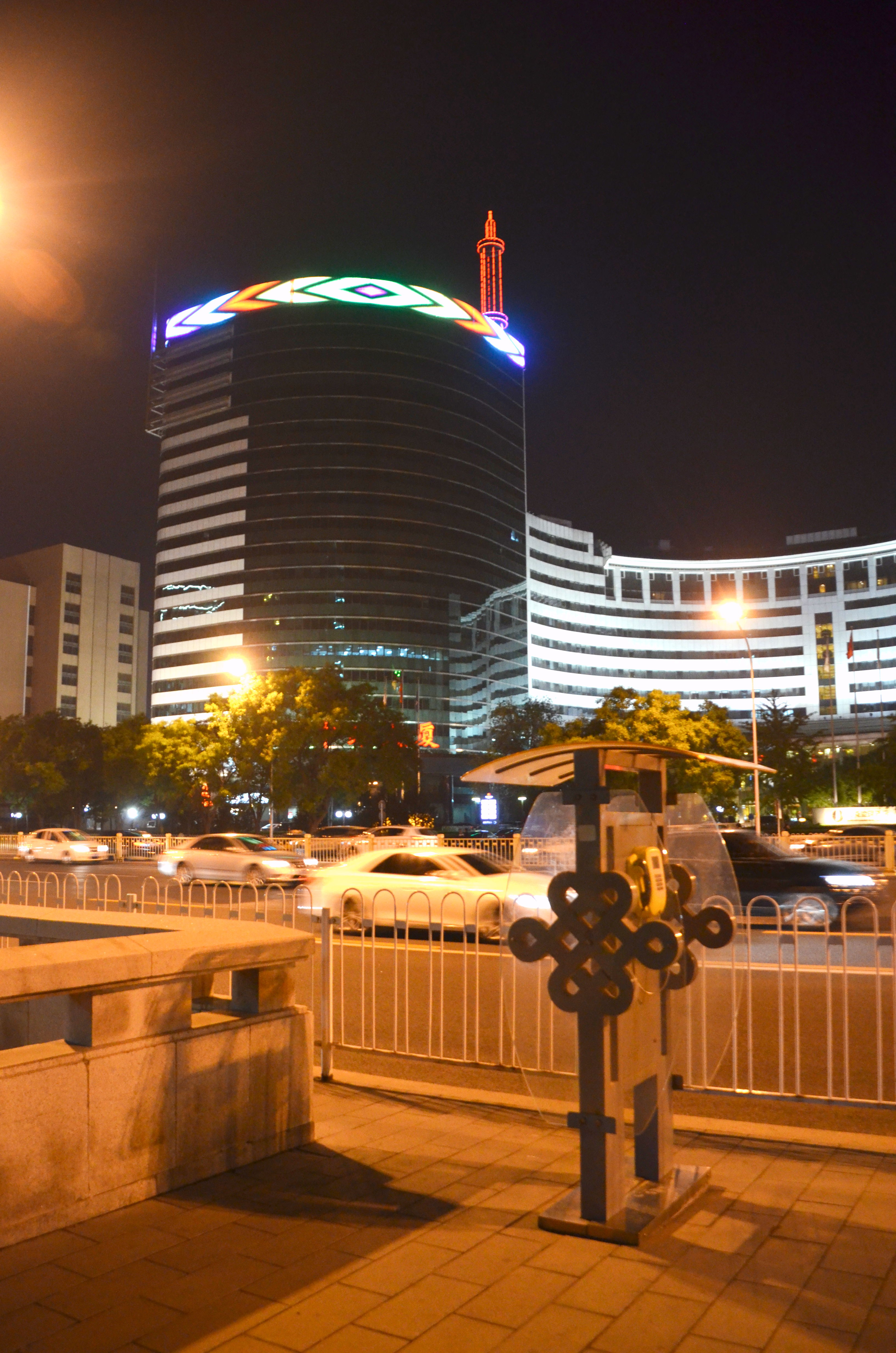
- Company type: State-own
- Industry: otton textiles, printing and dyeing of fabrics
- Founded: 1951; Beijing
- Headquarters: Beijing
- Parent: COFCO Group

Chinatex Corporation (Chinese: 中国中纺集团有限公司, 中国中纺) is a subsidiary of COFCO Group, formerly known as China National Textiles Import & Export Corporation. The company's business scope covers trading of cotton, wool and chemical fiber, R&D and manufacture of cotton textiles, printing and dyeing of fabrics, trade and domestic retailing of garments, and exhibitions at home and abroad.

== History ==
Founded in 1951, formerly known as China National Textiles Import & Export Corporation (CNTEX). In July 2016, with the consent of the State Council, the company as a whole was merged into COFCO and became its wholly owned subsidiary. Chinatex Corporation is a core main business company directly under COFCO Group operating cotton trading, textile printing and dyeing processing, etc., with layouts in all links of the industry chain, including cotton acquisition, processing, warehousing, logistics and import and export.
