= Lan (given name) =

Lan is a personal name, frequently used in Chinese and Vietnamese contexts as a feminine given name, which means "orchid" in Vietnamese.

In Vietnamese, "Lân" with the accent denotes a masculine given name, which refers to Kỳ Lân, a mythical creature that appears only to protect the noble. See qilin.

Lan may refer to:

== East Asian name order ==
- Bian Lan (born 1984), Chinese basketball player
- Hương Lan (born 1956), Vietnamese singer
- Jiang Lan (born 1989), Chinese sprinter
- Law Lan (born 1934), Hong Kong actress
- Lee Lee Lan (1944–2022), Malaysian ballet dancer and choreographer
- Li Lan (born 1961), Chinese handball player
- Lu Lan (born 1987), Chinese badminton player
- Lu Mong Lan (1927–2021), Vietnamese general
- Ngọc Lan (1956-2001), Vietnamese singer
- Sang Lan (born 1981), Chinese gymnast
- Zhao Lan (born 1963), Chinese chess player

== Western name order ==
- Lan Bale (born 1969), South African tennis player
- Lan Cao (born 1961), Vietnamese-born American novelist
- Lan Larison (born 2001), American football player
- Lan Medina, Filipino comic book artist
- Lan Pham, (born 1985 or 1986) New Zealand politician
- Lan Roberts (1936–2005), American radio presenter
- Lan Samantha Chang (born 1965), American writer
- Lan Wright (1923–2010), British writer

== Fiction ==
- Lan Asuka, fictional character in the Devil Lady manga series
- Lan Di, fictional character in the video games Shenmue and Shenmue II
- Lan Hikari, fictional character in the MegaMan Battle Network series of video games
- Lan Mandragoran, fictional character in the Wheel of Time series of novels by Robert Jordan
- Gabriel Lan, fictional character in the Marvel comics universe
- Lan Fan, a minor supporting character in the Fullmetal Alchemist manga
- Lan Kellyan, a fictional character in the book Monarch, the Big Bear of Tallac by Ernest Thompson Seton
- Tso Lan, a fictional character in the animated series Jackie Chan Adventures

== See also ==
- Lan (surname 蓝), a Chinese surname
- Lan (surname 兰), a Chinese surname
