= Guoyuan Subdistrict =

Guoyuan Subdistrict 果园街道
- Subdistrict
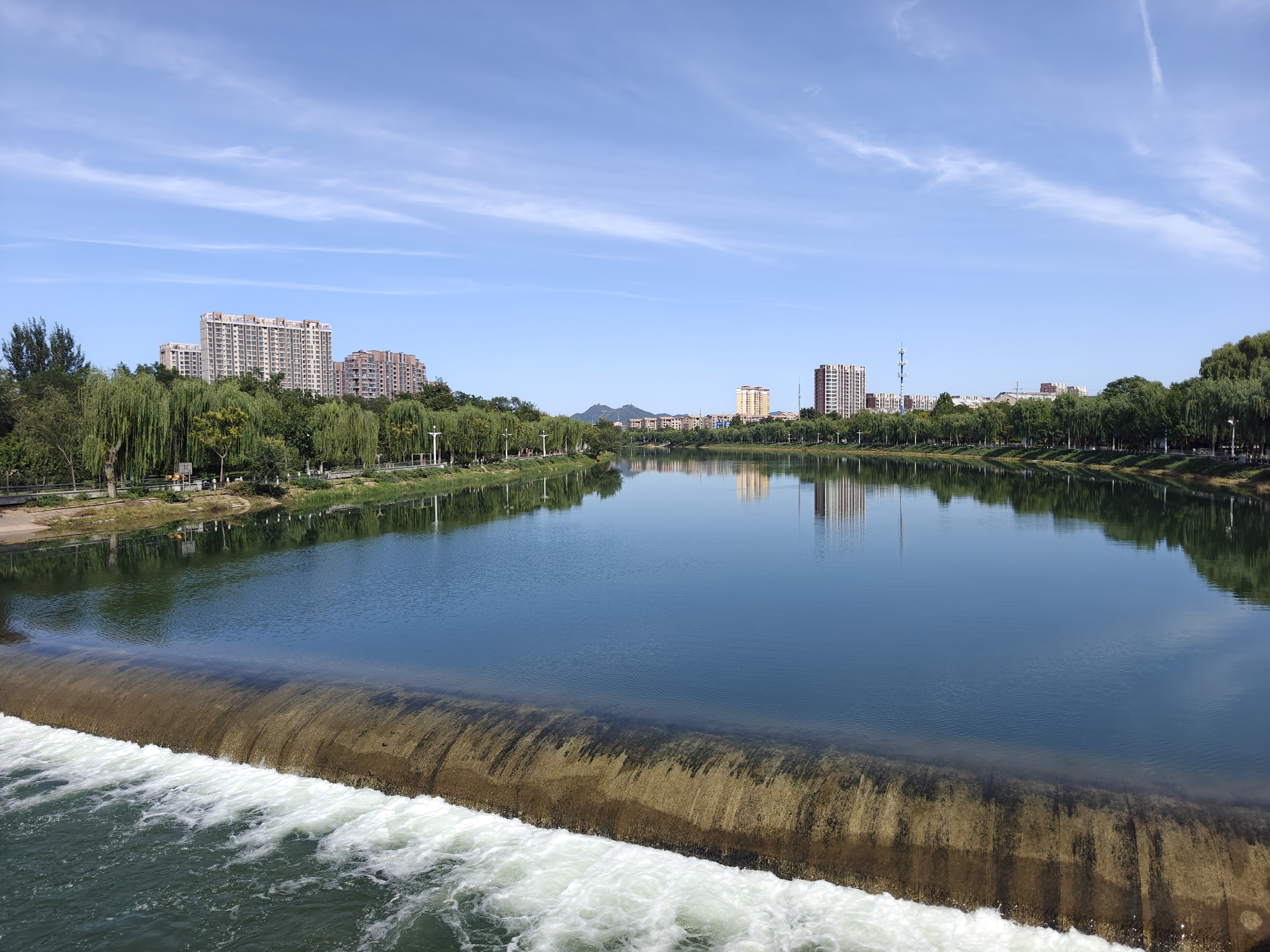
- Bai River, marking the border between Guoyuan and Gulou, 2025

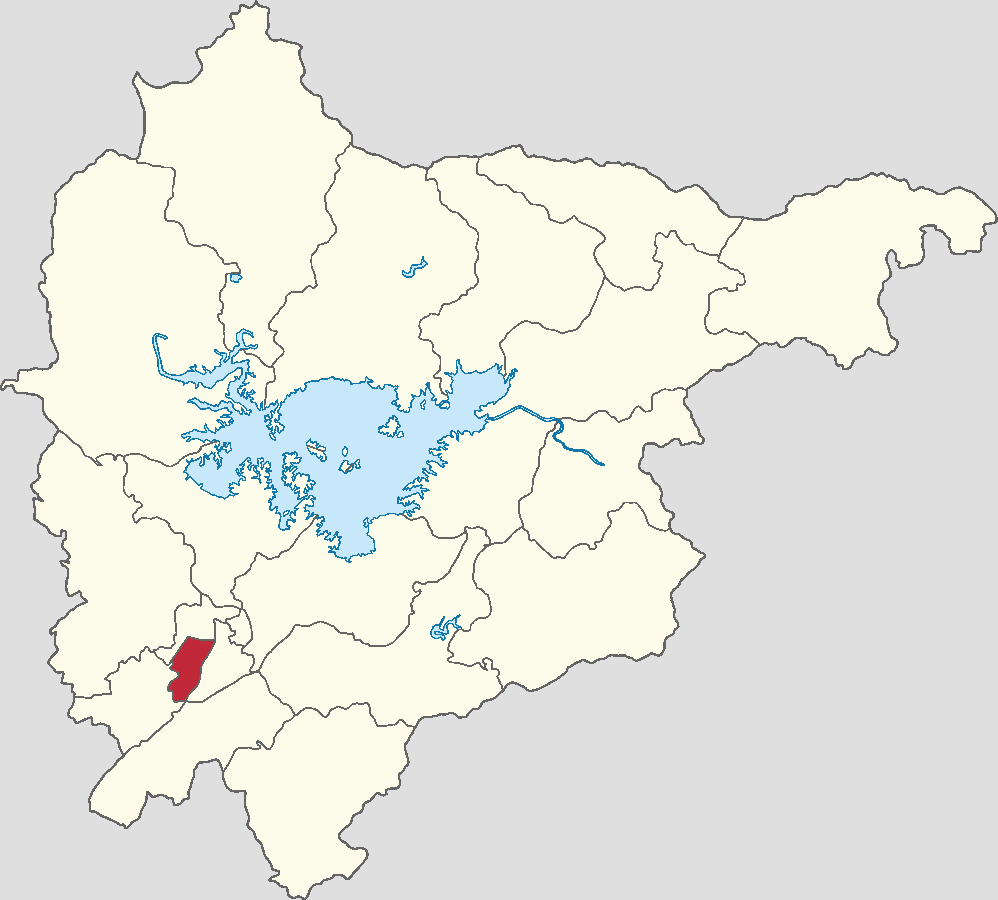
- Location in Miyun District

- Location within Beijing Location within China
- Coordinates: 40°22′34″N 116°49′44″E
- Country: China
- Municipality: Beijing
- District: Miyun
- Village-level Divisions: 18 communities

Area
  - Total: 7.55 km^{2} (2.92 sq mi)
- Elevation: 74 m (243 ft)

Population (2020)
  - Total: 88,764
  - Density: 11,800/km^{2} (30,500/sq mi)
- Time zone: UTC+8 (China Standard)
- Postal code: 101511
- Area code: 010

Guoyuan Subdistrict (simplified Chinese: 果园街道; traditional Chinese: 果園街道; pinyin: Guǒyuán Jiēdào) is a subdistrict located in the Miyun District of Beijing, China. It is located in the west bank of Bai River. The subdistrict borders Miyun Town to the north, Gulou Subdistrict to the east, and Shilipu Town to the southwest. Its total population was 88,764 as of 2020.

The subdistrict was created out of portions of Miyun Town in 2005. Its name literally means "Orchard".

== Administrative divisions ==
In the year 2021, Guoyuan Subdistrict consisted of these 18 communities:

Administrative Division Codes	Subdivision names	Name transliterations
110118002001	康居社区	Kangjusheqv
110118002002	新北路社区	Xinbeilusheqv
110118002003	兴云社区	Xingyunsheqv
110118002004	果园西里社区	Guoyuanxilisheqv
110118002005	果园新里社区	Guoyuanxinlisheqv
110118002006	果园新里北区社区	Guoyuanxinlibeiqusheqv
110118002007	密西花园社区	Mixihuayuansheqv
110118002008	季庄社区	Jizhuangsheqv
110118002009	康馨雅苑社区	Kangxinyayuansheqv
110118002010	瑞和园社区	Ruiheyuansheqv
110118002011	学府花园社区	Xuefuhuayuansheqv
110118002012	绿地社区	Lüdisheqv
110118002013	福荣社区	Furongsheqv
110118002014	嘉益社区	Jiayisheqv
110118002015	上河湾社区	Shanghewansheqv
110118002016	澜悦社区	Lanyuesheqv
110118002017	清水湾社区	Qingshuiwansheqv
110118002018	润博园社区	Runboyuansheqv

== See also ==
- List of township-level divisions of Beijing
