= Shilipu, Beijing =

Shilipu Town 十里堡镇
- Town
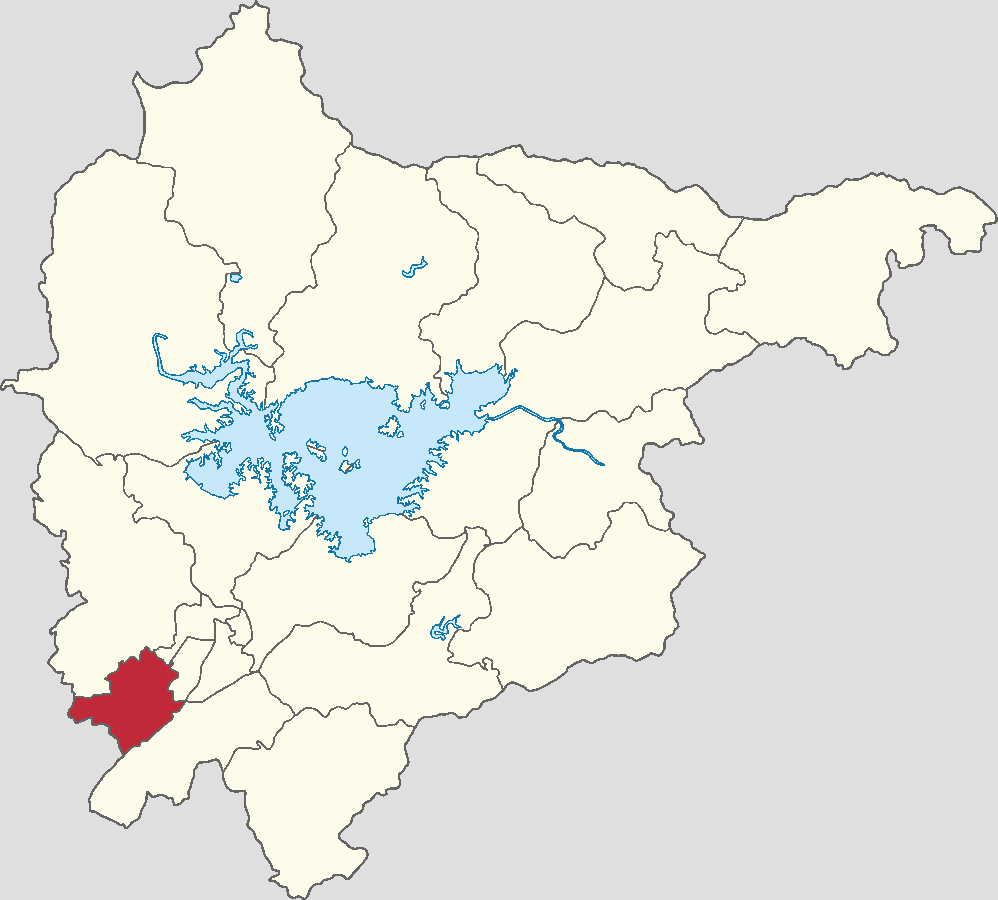
- Location of Shilipu Town in Miyun District

- Location within Beijing Location within China
- Coordinates: 40°21′26″N 116°47′45″E
- Country: China
- Municipality: Beijing
- District: Miyun
- Village-level Divisions: 5 communities 12 villages

Area
  - Total: 23.5 km^{2} (9.1 sq mi)
- Elevation: 64 m (210 ft)

Population (2020)
  - Total: 29,824
  - Density: 1,270/km^{2} (3,290/sq mi)
- Time zone: UTC+8 (China Standard)
- Postal code: 101509
- Area code: 010

Shilipu Town (simplified Chinese: 十里堡镇; traditional Chinese: 十裏堡鎮; pinyin: Shílǐpù Zhèn) is a town located in the Miyun District of Beijing, China. Situated along the China National Highway 101, it shares border with Xitiangezhuang and Miyun Towns in its north, Guoyuan Subdistrict and Henanzhai Town in its east, and Beifang Town in its southwest. As of 2020, it had 29,824 people residing under its administration.

Its name Shilipu (Chinese: 十里堡; lit. 'Ten Miles Fort') is derived from the fact that the village which the town was named after was ten Chinese miles away from the county's government building during the Qing dynasty.

== History ==
History of Shilipu Town
Year	Status	Within
1956 - 1958	Shilipu Township	Miyun County, Hebei
1958 - 1961	Shilipu Township	Miyun County, Beijing
1961 - 1966	Shilipu People's Commune	Miyun County, Beijing
1966 - 1974	Part of Xitiangezhuang People's Commune	Miyun County, Beijing
1974 - 1983	Shilipu People's Commune	Miyun County, Beijing
1983 - 1993	Shilipu Township	Miyun County, Beijing
1993 - 2015	Shilipu Town	Miyun County, Beijing
2015–present	Shilipu Town	Miyun District, Beijing

== Administrative divisions ==
As of 2023/2024, Shilipu Town was divided into 18 subdivisions, more specifically 6 communities and 12 villages. They are, by the order of the 2021 Administrative Division Codes:

Administrative Division Codes	Subdivision names	Name transliterations	Type
110118103001	十里堡社区	Shilipusheqv	Community
110118103002	燕落寨社区	Yanluozhaisheqv	Community
110118103003	明珠社区	Mingzhusheqv	Community
110118103004	王各庄社区	Wanggezhuangsheqv	Community
110118103005	博世庄园社区	Boshizhuangyuansheqv	Community
110118103006	海怡庄园社区	Haiyizhuangyuansheqv	Community
110118103201	燕落寨村	Yanluozhaicun	Village
110118103202	水源里村	Shuiyuanlicun	Village
110118103203	清河源村	Qingheyuancun	Village
110118103204	十里堡村	Shilipucun	Village
110118103205	靳各庄村	Jingezhuangcun	Village
110118103206	岭东村	Lingdongcun	Village
110118103207	双井村	Shuangjingcun	Village
110118103208	观音寺村	Guanyinsicun	Village
110118103209	杨新庄村	Yangxinzhuangcun	Village
110118103210	红里村	Honglicun	Village
110118103211	程家庄村	Chengjiazhuangcun	Village
110118103212	庄禾屯村	Zhuanghetuncun	Village

== See also ==
- List of township-level divisions of Beijing
