= Lake Lans =

Lake in Tyrol, Austria

Lanser See Lake Lans
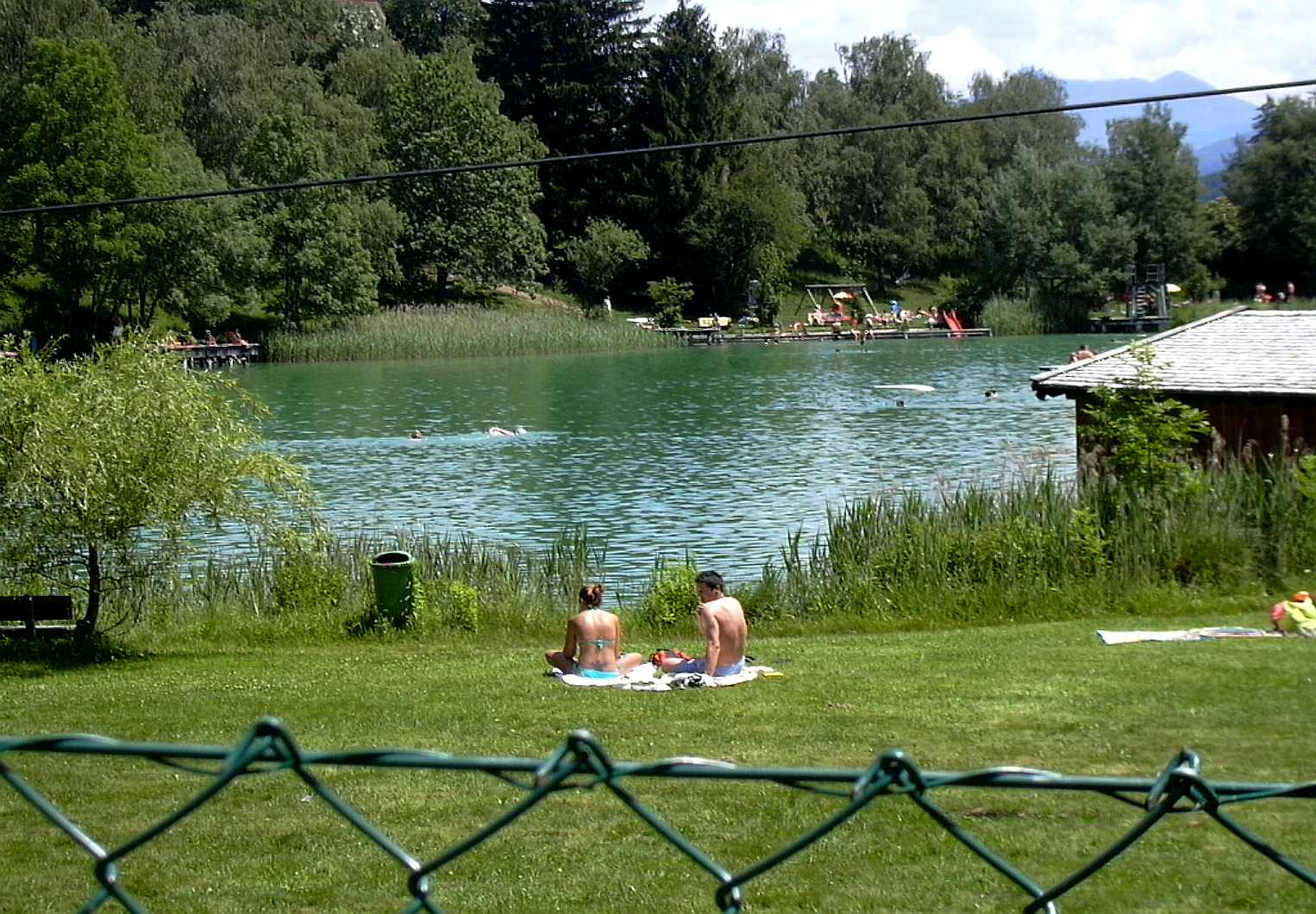
- Southern shore

- Location within Tyrol, Austria
- Location: near Lans, Tyrol
- Coordinates: 47°14′25″N 11°25′06″E
- Primary outflows: Viller brook
- Basin countries: Austria
- Surface area: 0.035 km^{2} (0.014 sq mi)
- Average depth: 3 m (9.8 ft)
- Max. depth: 12 m (39 ft)
- Water volume: 262,500 m^{3} (9,270,000 cu ft)
- Surface elevation: 980 m (3,220 ft)
- Settlements: Igls, Lans

The Lake Lans or Lanser See is a lake for bathing near Lans located on the southern highlands above Innsbruck, Austria. The lake can be reached by Streetcar Line 6 from Innsbruck. The lake is popular due to its green environment. It is used for ice-skating during the winter. The lake belongs to the city area of Innsbruck.

Thanks to its fen water the Lanser See has generally excellent water quality, although it is affected in summer due to its recreational use.
