= Nyasvizh district =

District of Minsk region, Belarus

Nyasvizh District Нясвіжскі раён (Belarusian) Несвижский район (Russian)
- District
- Flag Coat of arms

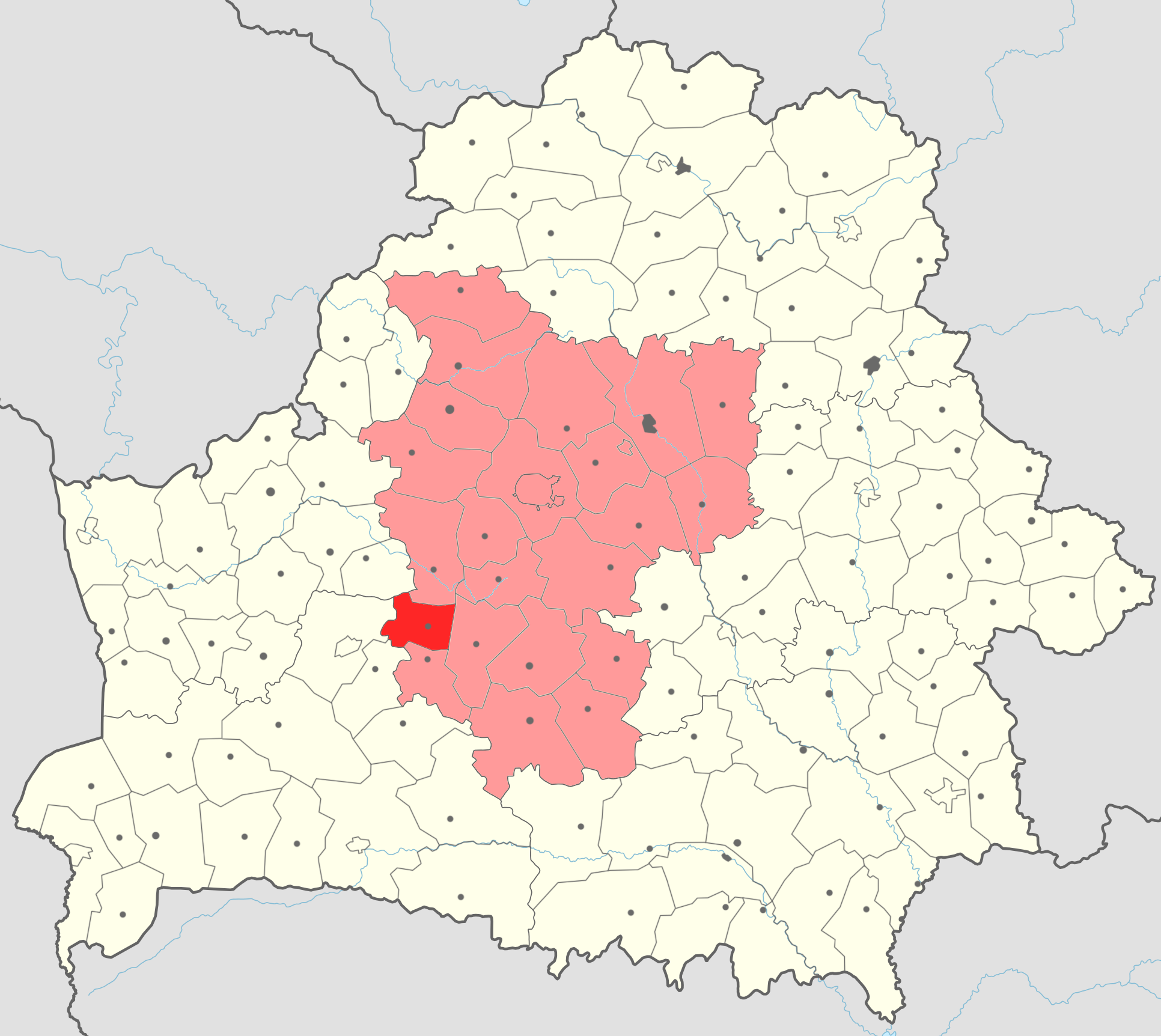
- Coordinates: 53°13′N 26°40′E
- Country: Belarus
- Region: Minsk region
- Administrative center: Nyasvizh

Area
  - District: 862.75 km^{2} (333.11 sq mi)

Population (2024)
  - District: 38,667
  - Density: 44.818/km^{2} (116.08/sq mi)
  - Urban: 19,569
  - Rural: 19,098
- Time zone: UTC+3 (MSK)

Nyasvizh district or Niasviž district (Belarusian: Нясвіжскі раён; Russian: Несвижский район) is a district (raion) of Minsk region in Belarus. Its administrative center is Nyasvizh. As of 2024, it has a population of 38,667.

== Notable residents ==
- Alexander Nadson (1926, Haradzyeya – 2015), the Apostolic Visitor for Belarusian Greek-Catholic faithful abroad, scholar, translator and a notable Belarusian émigré social and religious leader
- Uładzimir Žyłka (1900, Makašy village – 1933), Belarusian poet and Gulag prisoner
