= Xinchengzi, Beijing =

Xinchengzi Town 新城子镇
- Town
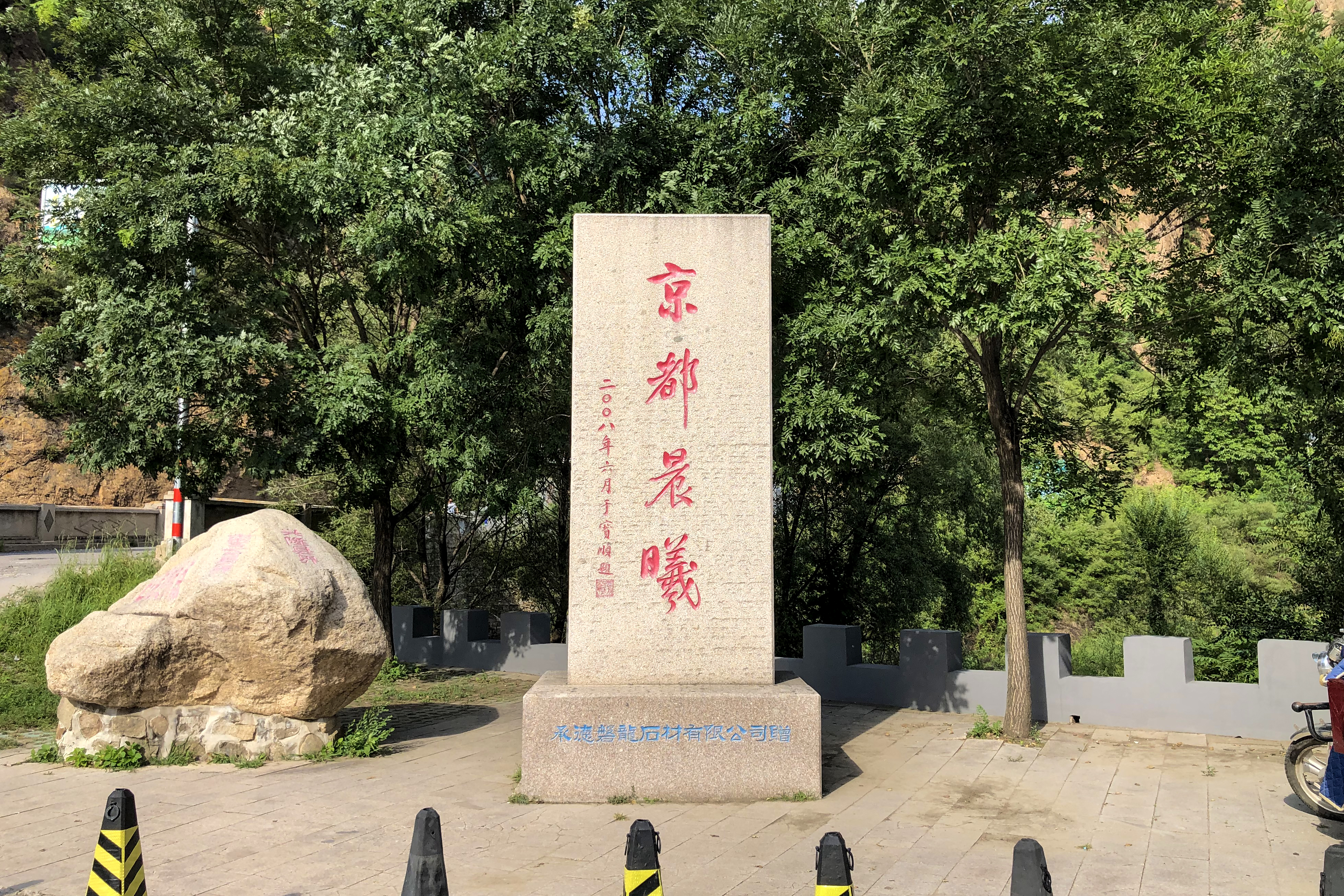
- Peking Sunrise stele in Huayuan Village, marking the eastern most point of Beijing, 2020

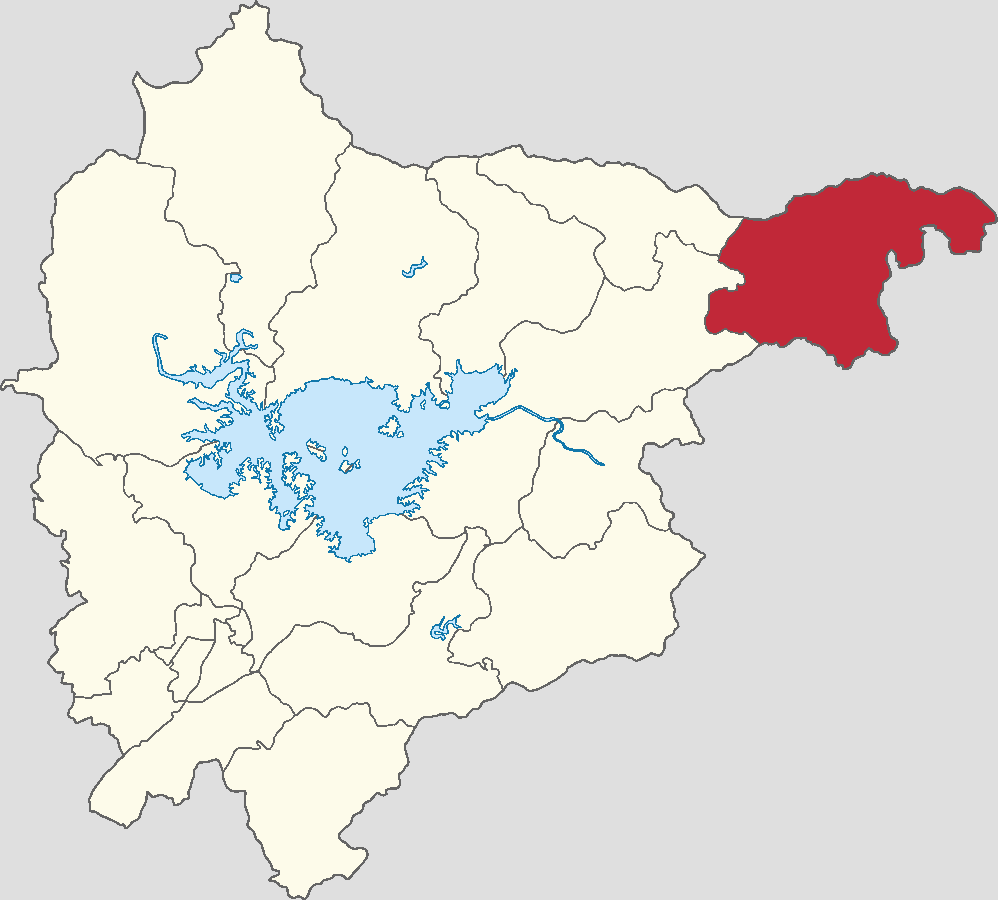
- Location within Miyun District

- Location within Beijing Location within China
- Coordinates: 40°38′33″N 117°19′41″E
- Country: China
- Municipality: Beijing
- District: Miyun
- Village-level Divisions: 1 communities 18 villages

Area
  - Total: 157.7 km^{2} (60.9 sq mi)
- Elevation: 370 m (1,210 ft)

Population (2020)
  - Total: 6,528
  - Density: 41.40/km^{2} (107.2/sq mi)
- Time zone: UTC+8 (China Standard)
- Postal code: 101506
- Area code: 010

Xinchengzi Town (simplified Chinese: 新城子镇; traditional Chinese: 新城子鎮; pinyin: Xīnchéngzi Zhèn) is a town located in the Miyun District of Beijing, China. It borders Liangjianfang and Laowa Townships in the north, Wulingshan Town in the east and south, as well as Gubeikou and Taishitun Towns in the west. It had 6,528 residents under its administration as of 2020.

The name Xinchengzi comes from Xinchengzi Village, the place in which the town's government is located. It literally means "New City".

== Geography ==
Xinchengzi is situated foothill of Mount Wuling, which is part of the larger Yan Mountain Range. Andamu River flows western through the town.

The town is connected to the Beijing-Chengde Expressway, as well as the city-level Songcao Road.

== History ==
Timetable of Xinchengzi Town
Year	Status	Under
1949 - 1958	8th District	Miyun County, Hebei
1958 - 1983	Zhongxing People's Commune	Miyun County, Beijing
1983 - 2003	Xinchengzi Township	Miyun County, Beijing
2003 - 2015	XInchengzi Town	Miyun County, Beijing
2015–present	XInchengzi Town	Miyun District, Beijing

== Administrative divisions ==
By 2021, Xinchengzi Town was composed of 19 subdivisions, where 1 was a community and 18 were villages. They can be seen in the list down below:

Subdivision names	Name transliterations	Type
新城子	Xinchengzi	Community
花园	Huayuan	Village
大角峪	Dajiaoyu	Village
曹家路	Caojialu	Village
蔡家甸	Caijiadian	Village
东沟	Donggou	Village
崔家峪	Cuijiayu	Village
二道沟	Erdaogou	Village
头道沟	Toudaogou	Village
小口	Xiaokou	Village
遥桥峪	Yaoqiaoyu	Village
新城子	Xinchengzi	Village
巴各庄	Bagezhuang	Village
太古石	Taigushi	Village
吉家营	Jijiaying	Village
苏家峪	Sujiayu	Village
塔沟	Tagou	Village
大树洼	Dashuwa	Village
坡头	Potou	Village

== Gallery ==
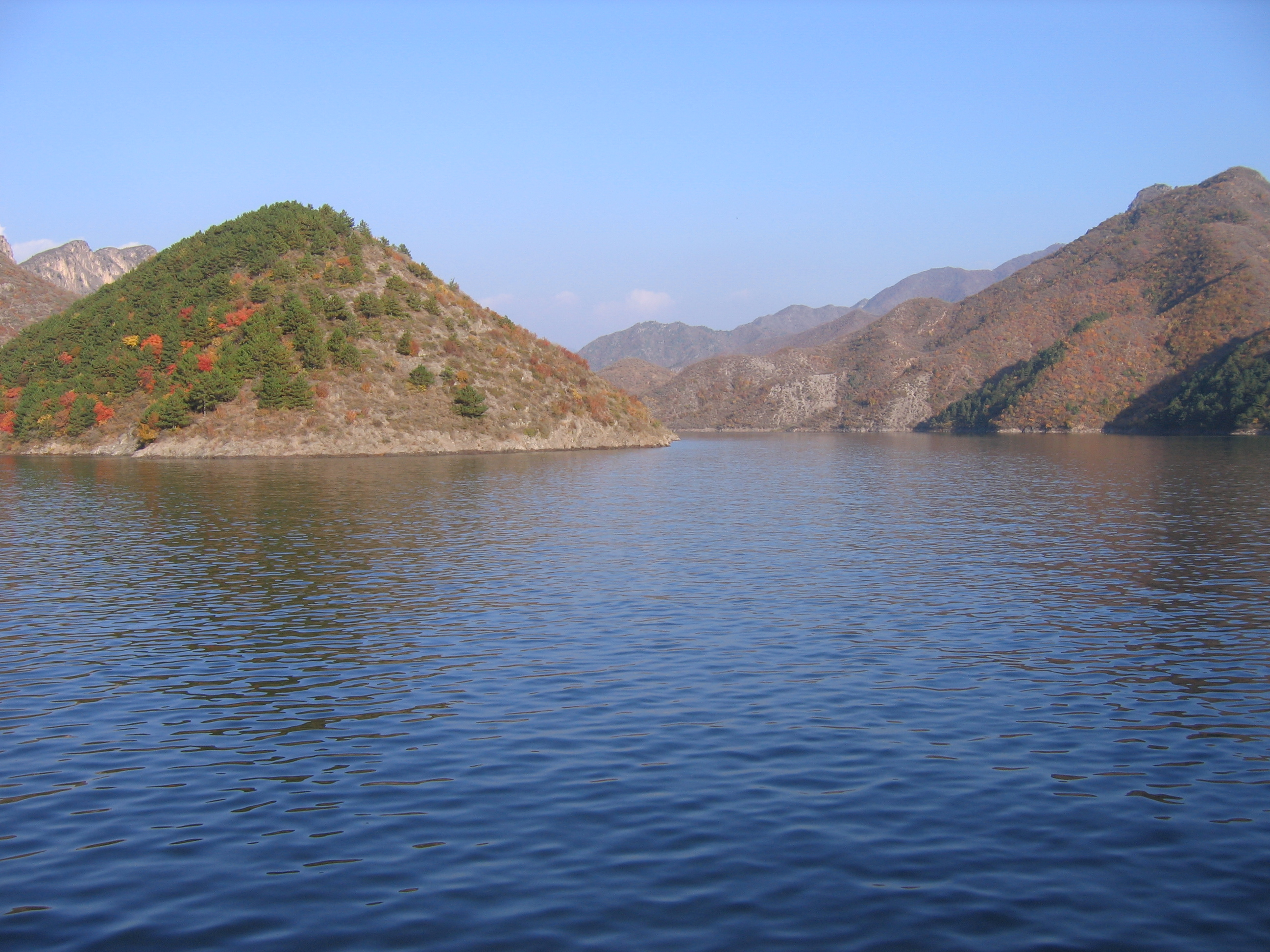
Wuling Lake within the town, 2008

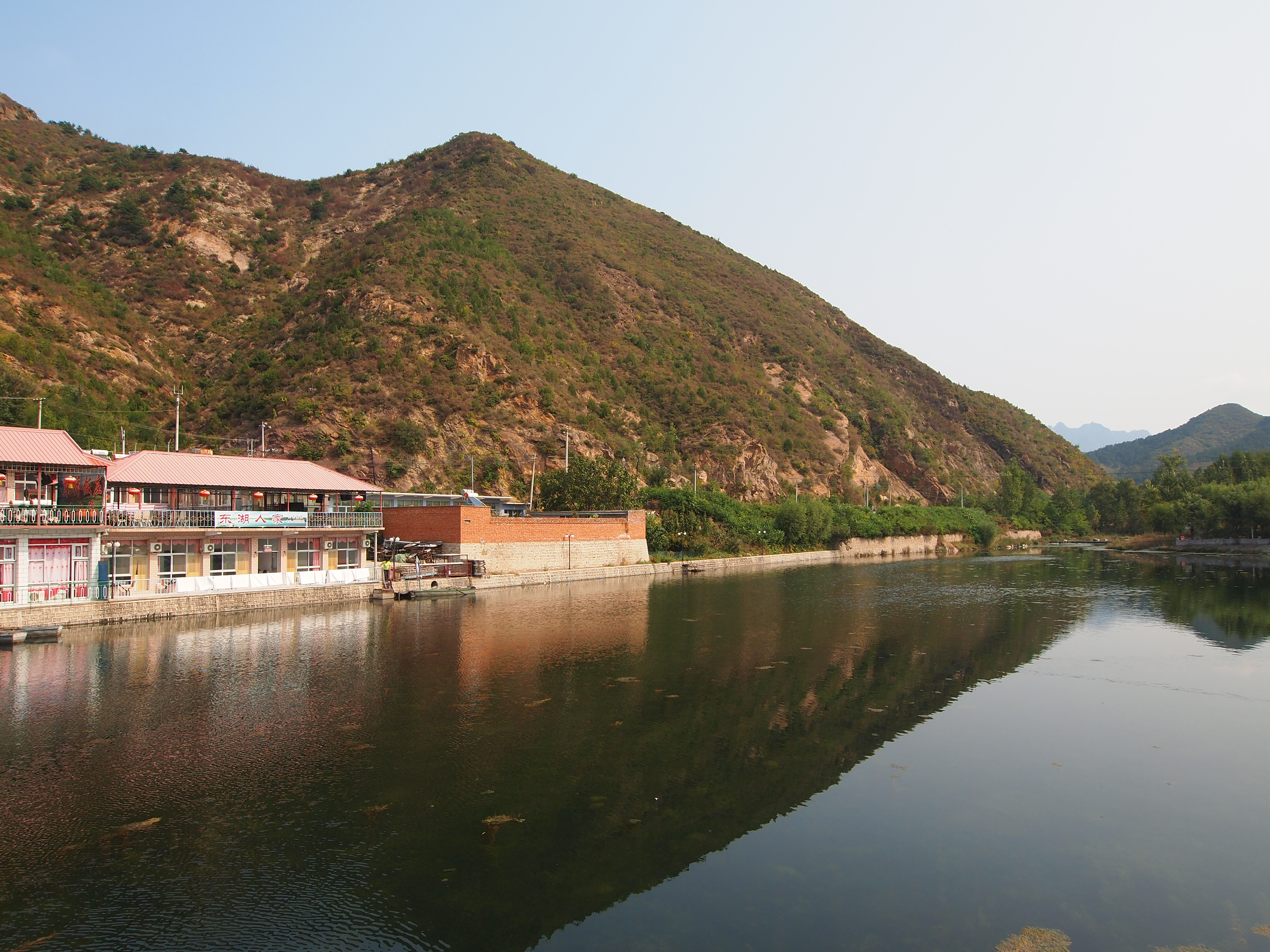
Caojialu Village, 2012

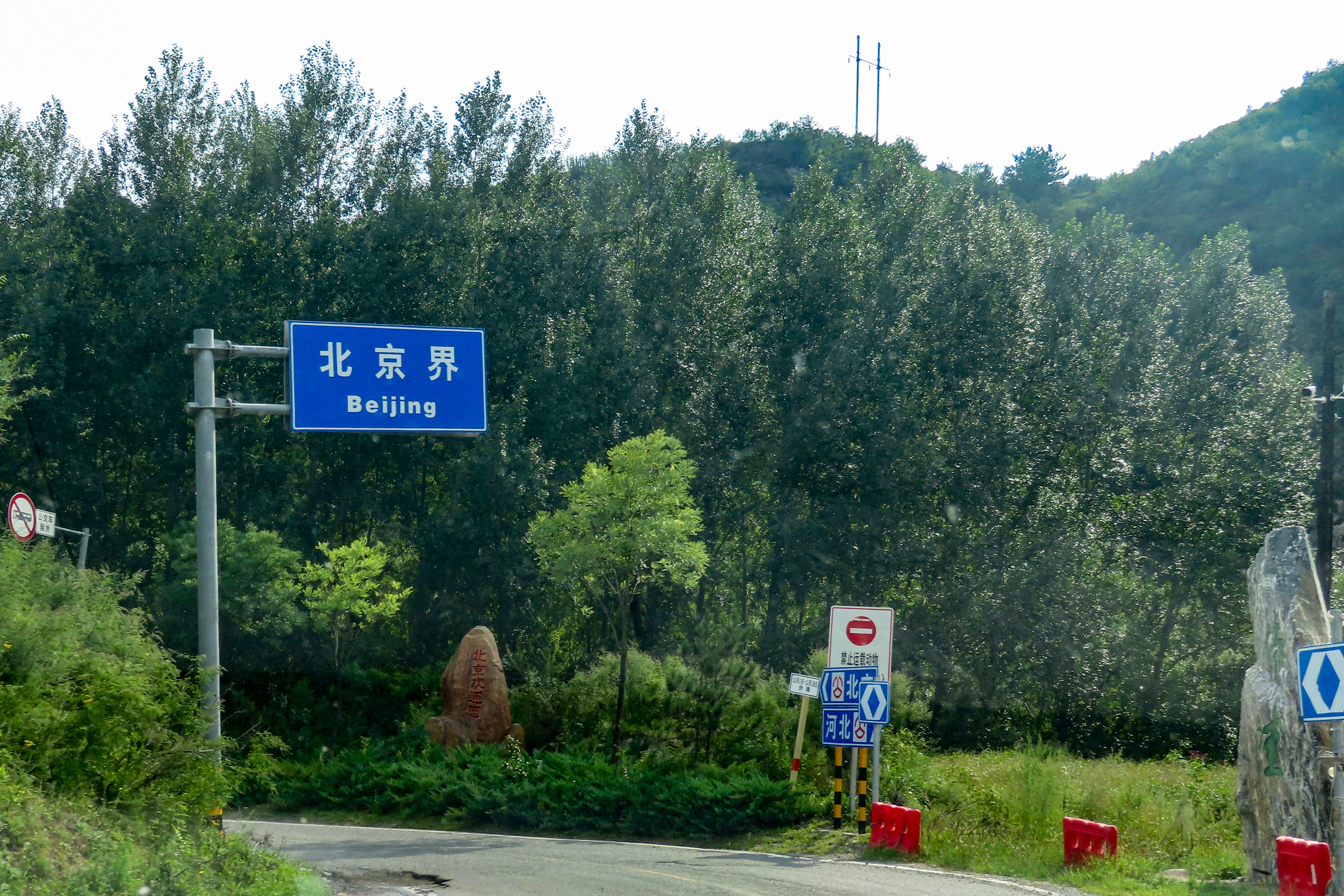
Border with Hebei province, 2020

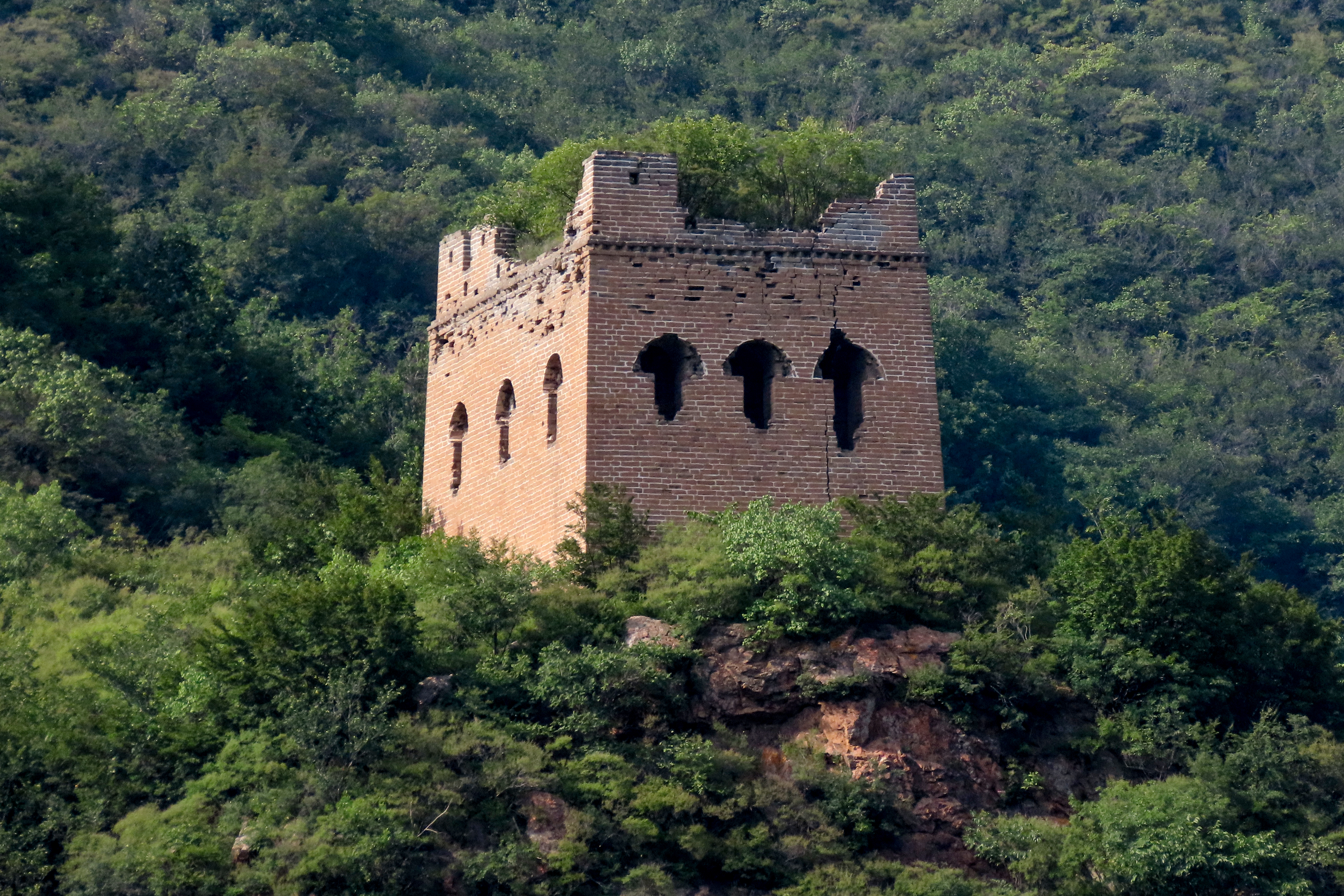
Heigu Pass on the eastern border with Hebei, 2020

== See also ==
- List of township-level divisions of Beijing
