= Haihe Plain =

Plain in China

Haihe Plain (Chinese: 海河平原) is a plain located in the north of the North China Plain. It's named after the Hai River. The plain is bordered on the north by the Yanshan Mountains, on the west by the Taihang Mountains, to the south flows the Yellow River and to east fronts the Bohai Sea. Its area is approximately 120,000 square kilometers. Many important Chinese cities lie on the plain, including Beijing, Tianjin, Shijiazhuang, Handan, Cangzhou. The plain era is the main food grain region of North China.
