= Fengjiayu =

Fengjiayu Town 冯家峪镇
- Town
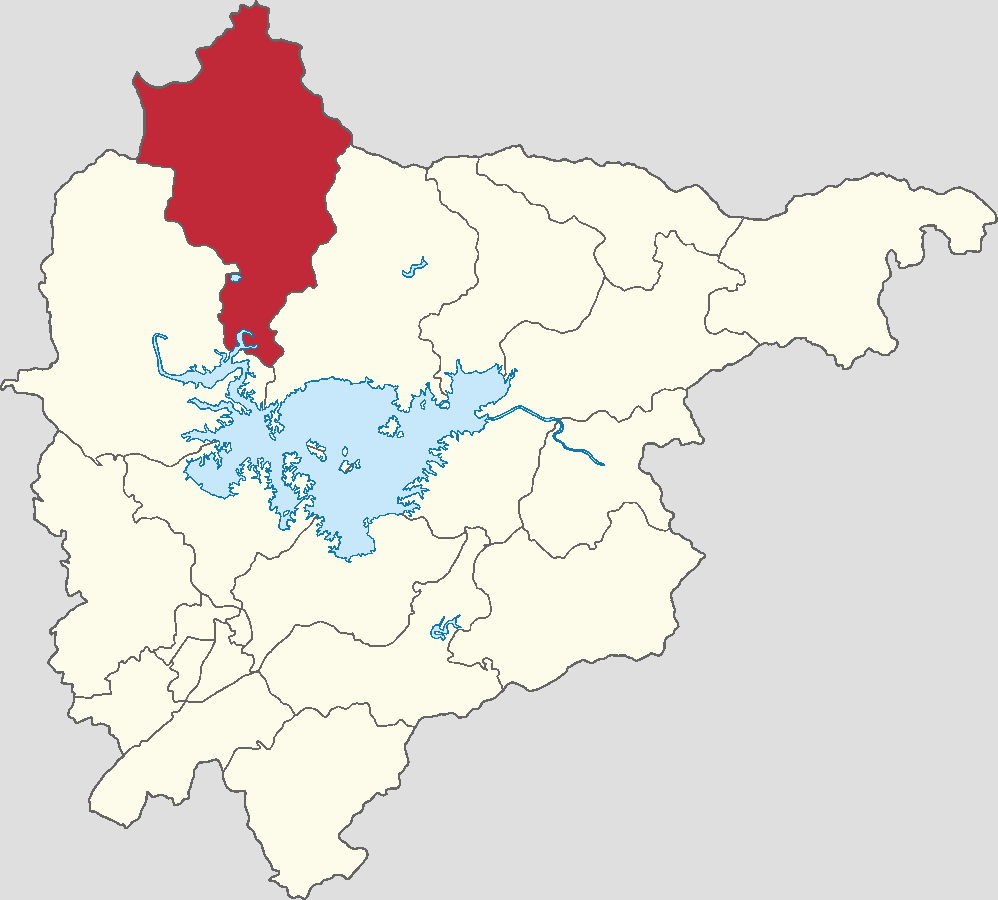
- Location in Miyun District

- Location within Beijing Location within China
- Coordinates: 40°37′07″N 116°52′13″E
- Country: China
- Municipality: Beijing
- District: Miyun
- Village-level Divisions: 1 community 18 villages

Area
  - Total: 215.1 km^{2} (83.1 sq mi)
- Elevation: 280 m (920 ft)

Population (2020)
  - Total: 4,485
  - Density: 20.85/km^{2} (54.00/sq mi)
- Time zone: UTC+8 (China Standard)
- Postal code: 101515
- Area code: 010

Fengjiayu Town (simplified Chinese: 冯家峪镇; traditional Chinese: 馮家峪鎮; pinyin: Féngjiāyù Zhèn) is a town located in the Miyun District of Beijing, China. It sits along the banks of Baimaguan River within the Yan Mountain Range. The town shares border with Dengchang Manchu Ethnic Township in its north, Bulaotun Town in its southeast, Shicheng Town in its southwest, and Changshaoying Manchu Ethnic Township in its northwest. As of 2020, it had a population of 4,485.

According to local legend, Song female general Mu Guiying had once stayed here for armor repair, and the region was thus named Fengjiayu (Chinese: 缝甲峪; lit. 'Sew Armor Valley'). Later the name would evolve into Fengjiayu (Chinese: 冯家峪) of today.

== History ==
Timeline of Fengjiayu's History
Year	Status	Within
1953 - 1958	Fengjiayu Township	Miyun County, Hebei
1958 - 1983	Shengli People's Commune	Miyun County, Beijing
1983 - 1993	Fengjiayu Township	Miyun County, Beijing
1993 - 2015	Fengjiayu Town	Miyun County, Beijing
2015–present	Fengjiayu Town	Miyun District, Beijing

== Administrative divisions ==
As of the time in writing, Fengjiayu Town consists of the following 19 subdivisions:

Subdivision names	Name transliterations	Type
冯家峪	Fengjiayu	Community
保峪岭	Baoyuling	Village
西庄子	Xizhuangzi	Village
石洞子	Shidongzi	Village
冯家峪	Fengjiayu	Village
西口外	Xikouwai	Village
西白莲峪	Xi Bailianyu	Village
三岔口	Sanchakou	Village
朱家峪	Zhujiayu	Village
下营	Xiaying	Village
白马关	Baimaguan	Village
番字牌	Fanzipai	Village
黄梁根	Huanglianggen	Village
西苍峪	Xicangyu	Village
司营子	Siyingzi	Village
前火岭	Qianhuoling	Village
石湖根	Shihugen	Village
北栅子	Beizhazi	Village
南台子	Nantaizi	Village

== Transportation ==
Liuxin Road passes through the south of the town, crossing Baimaguan River near Xizhuangzi Village.

== See also ==
- List of township-level divisions of Beijing
