= Bulaotun =

Bulaotun Town 不老屯镇
- Town
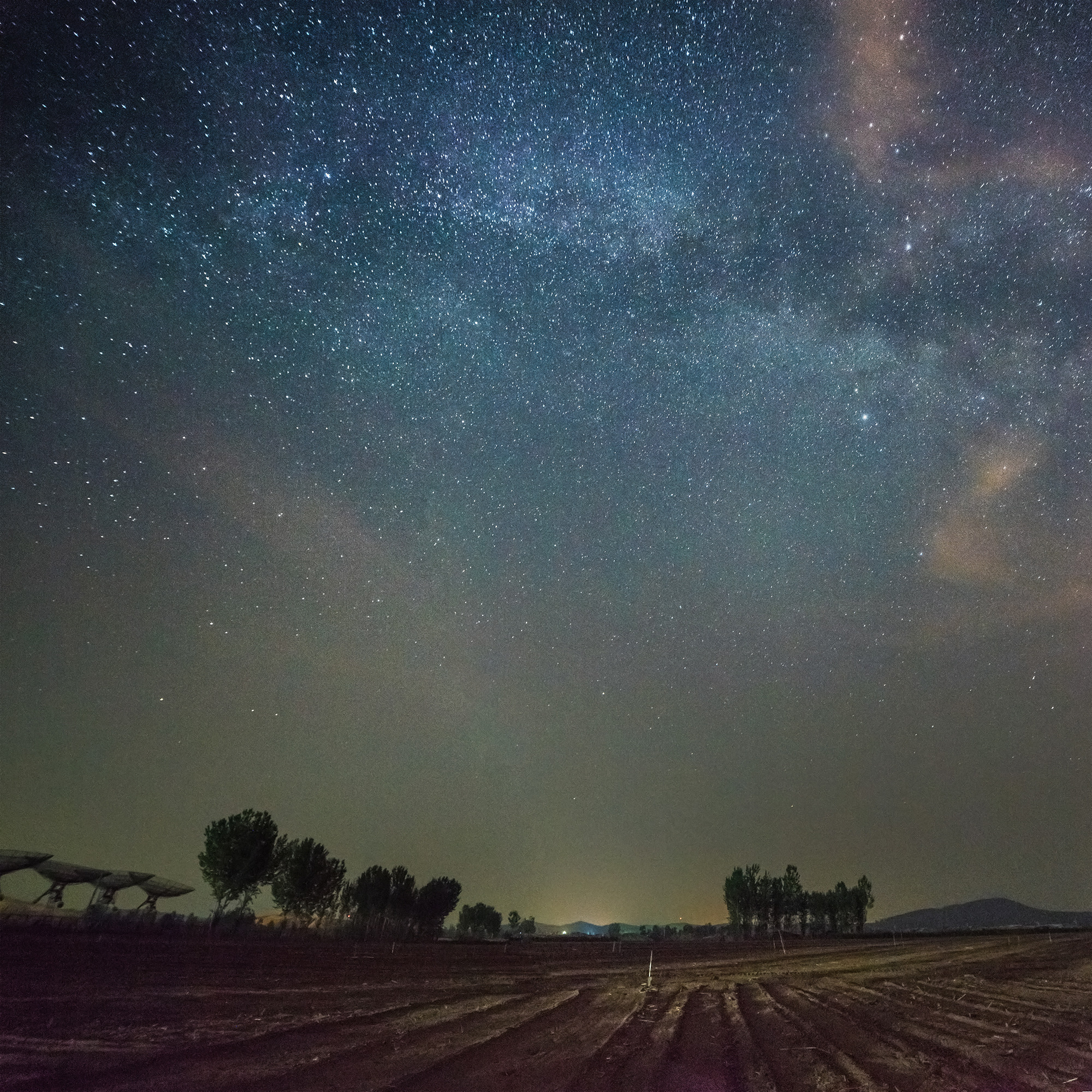
- Night sky near Xuegezhuang, 2015

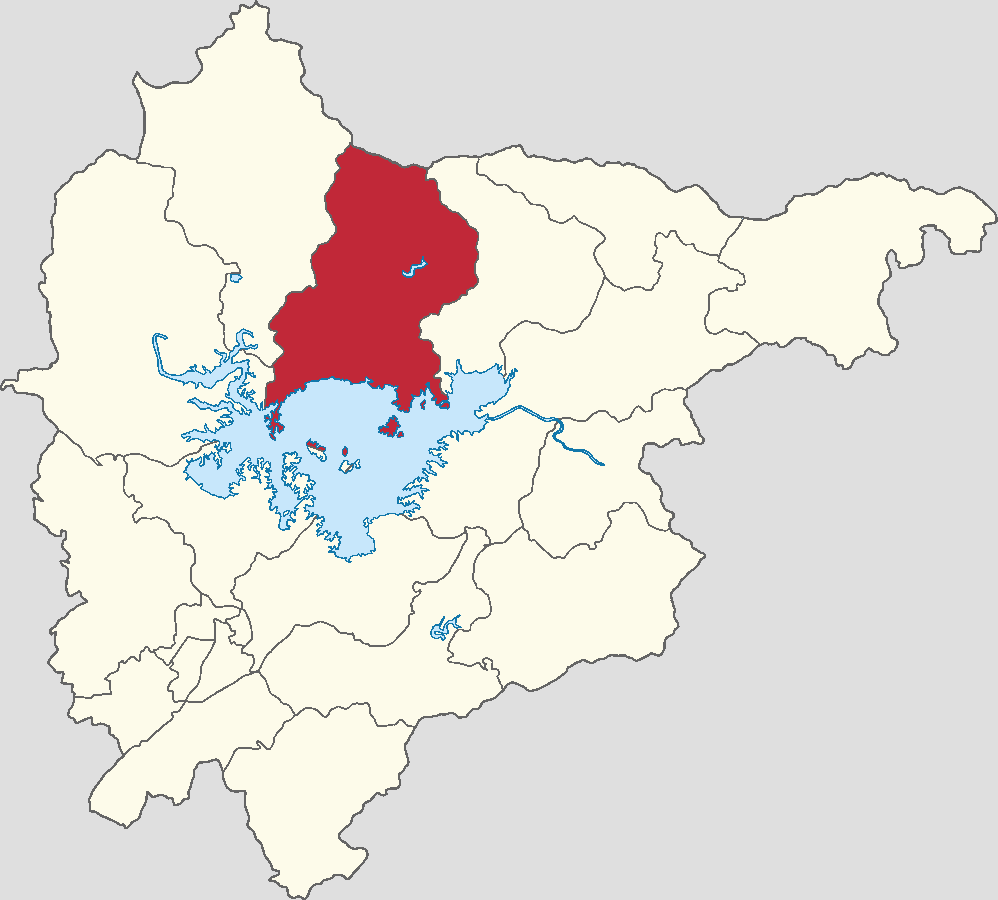
- Location in Miyun District

- Location within Beijing Location within China
- Coordinates: 40°33′59″N 116°58′13″E
- Country: China
- Municipality: Beijing
- District: Miyun
- Village-level Divisions: 2 communities 26 villages

Area
  - Total: 226.8 km^{2} (87.6 sq mi)
- Elevation: 164 m (538 ft)

Population (2020)
  - Total: 12,705
  - Density: 56.02/km^{2} (145.1/sq mi)
- Time zone: UTC+8 (China Standard)
- Postal code: 101516
- Area code: 010

Bulaotun Town (simplified Chinese: 不老屯镇; traditional Chinese: 不老屯鎮; pinyin: Bùlǎotún Zhèn) is a town located in the Miyun District of Beijing, China. It lies between part of Yan Mountain Range and Miyun Reservoir. The town borders Mayingzi Manchu Ethnic Township to the north, Gaoling Town to the east, Xiwengzhuang and Mujiayu Towns to the south, as well as Shicheng and Fengjiayu Towns to the west. In 2020, it was home to 12,705 inhabitants.

This town's name Bulaotun (Chinese: 不老屯; lit. 'Eternal Youth Villa') originates from a local legend about a farmer encountering two immortals during his woodcutting trip in the mountains.

== History ==
Timeline of Bulaotun's History
Year	Status	Belong to
1912 - 1928	3rd District	Miyun County, Capital Area
1928 - 1945	3rd District	Miyun County, Hebei
1945 - 1949	Shizha Town	Miyun County, Hebei
1945 - 1949	4th District	Yihua County, Peiping
1949 - 1950	4th District	Miyun County, Hebei
1950 - 1953	7th District	Miyun County, Hebei
1953 - 1958	Bulaotun Township	Miyun County, Hebei
1958 - 1959	Under Huojian People's Commune	Miyun County, Beijing
1959 - 1961	Under Gaoling People's Commune	Miyun County, Beijing
1961 - 1983	Bulaotun People's Commune	Miyun County, Beijing
1983 - 1990	Bulaotun Township	Miyun County, Beijing
1990 - 2015	Bulaotun Town (Banchengzi Township was added in 1993)	Miyun County, Beijing
2015–present	Bulaotun Town (Banchengzi Township was added in 1993)	Miyun District, Beijing

== Administrative divisions ==
In the year 2021, Bulaotun Town consisted of 28 subdivisions, with 2 communities and 26 villages. They are listed as follows:

Subdivision names	Name transliterations	Type
不老屯	Bulaotun	Community
燕落	Yanluo	Community
杨各庄	Yanggezhuang	Village
董各庄	Donggezhuang	Village
沙峪里	Shayuli	Village
学艺厂	Xueyichang	Village
转山子	Zhuanshanzi	Village
黄土坎	Huangtukan	Village
燕落	Yanluo	Village
不老屯	Bulaotun	Village
白土沟	Baitugou	Village
丑山子	Choushanzi	Village
边庄子	Bianzhuangzi	Village
车道岭	Chedaoling	Village
兵马营	Bingmaying	Village
柳树沟	Liushugou	Village
大窝铺	Dawopu	Village
永乐	Yongle	Village
西学各庄	Xi Xuegezhuang	Village
香水峪	Xiangshuiyu	Village
北香峪	Bei Xiangyu	Village
南香峪	Nan Xiangyu	Village
半城子	Banchengzi	Village
史庄子	Shizhuangzi	Village
古石峪	Gushiyu	Village
陈家峪	Chenjiayu	Village
阳坡地	Yangpodi	Village
西坨古	Xituogu	Village

== Transportation ==
Liuxin Road runs through the town.

== See also ==
- List of township-level divisions of Beijing
