= Xiong'erzhai Township =

Xiong'erzhai Township 熊儿寨乡
- Township
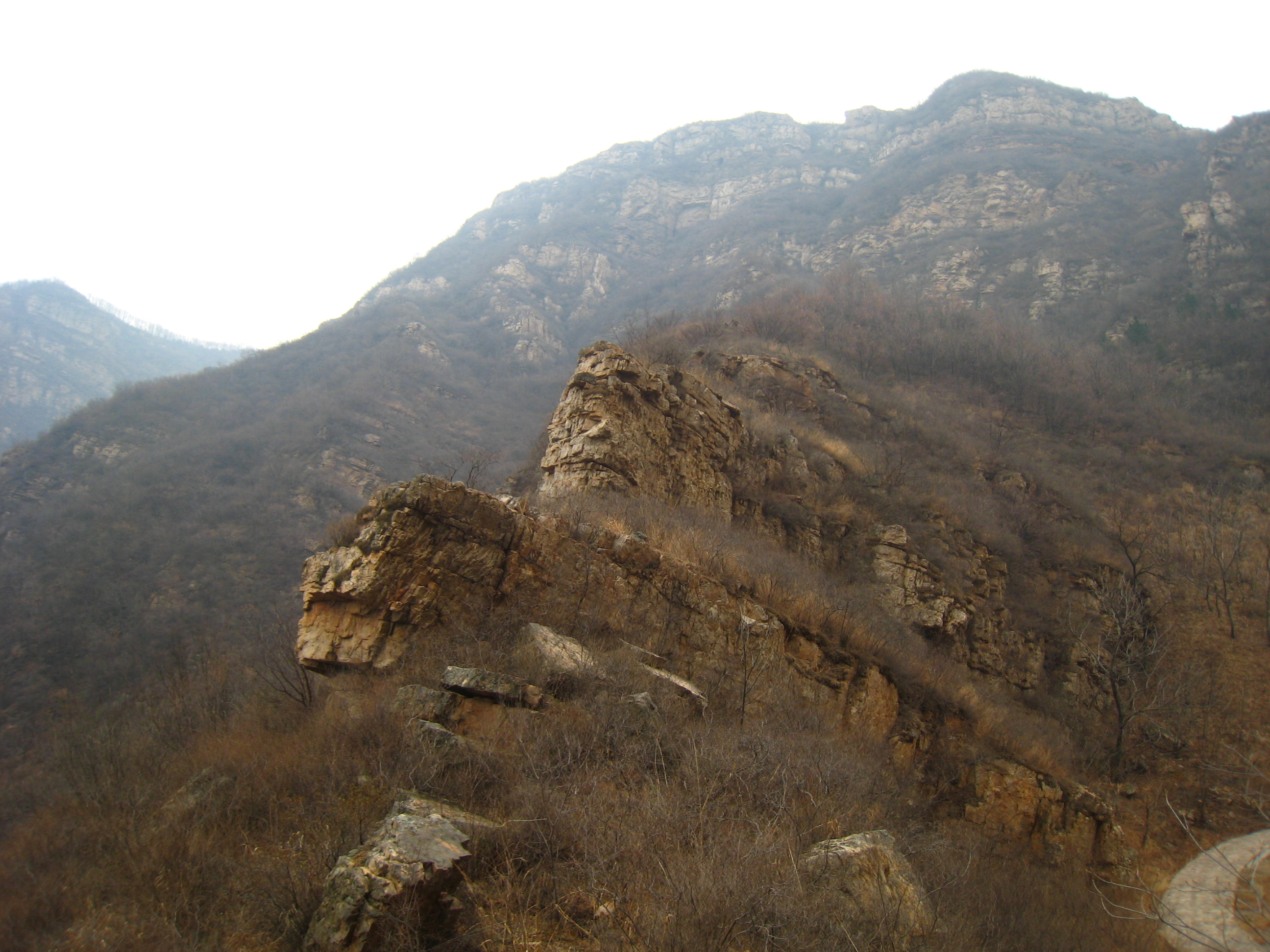
- Sanyang Ancient Volcano on the south of Huayu Village, 2009

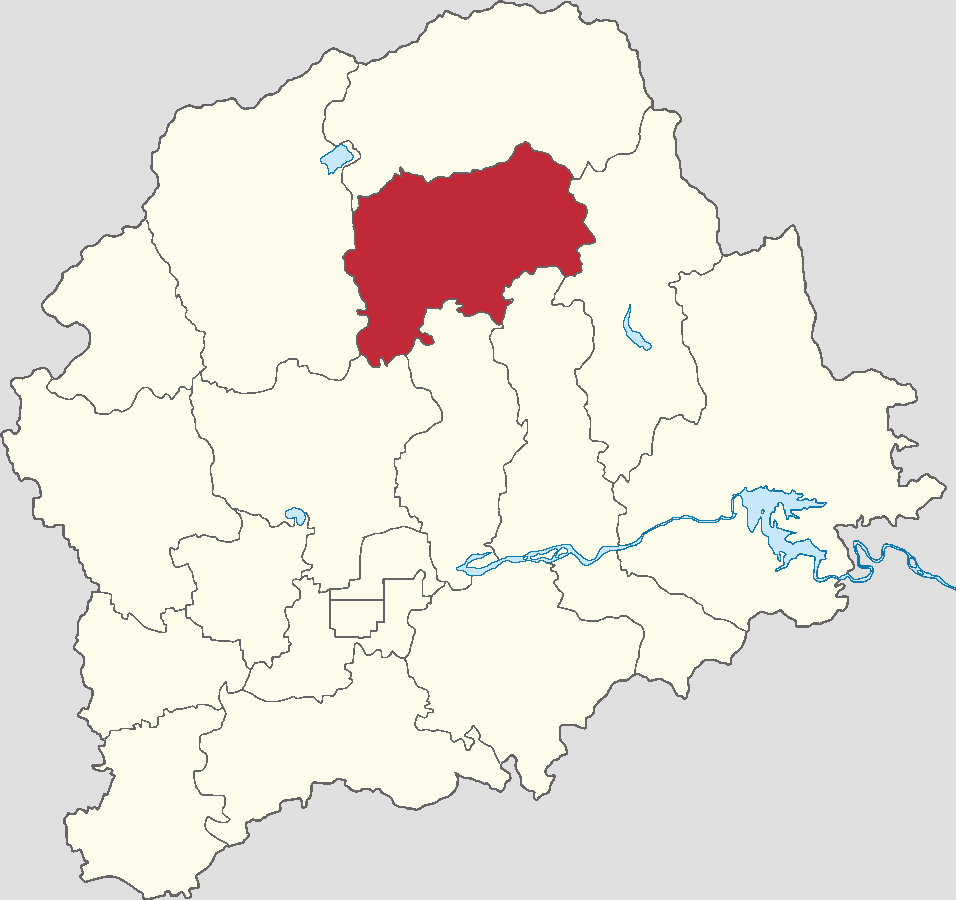
- Location of Xiong'erzhai Township in Pinggu District

- Location within Beijing Location within China
- Coordinates: 40°17′01″N 117°07′40″E
- Country: China
- Municipality: Beijing
- District: Pinggu
- Village-level Divisions: 8 villages

Area
  - Total: 58.74 km^{2} (22.68 sq mi)
- Elevation: 213 m (699 ft)

Population (2020)
  - Total: 2,859
  - Density: 48.67/km^{2} (126.1/sq mi)
- Time zone: UTC+8 (China Standard)
- Postal code: 101207
- Area code: 010

Xiong'erzhai Township (simplified Chinese: 熊儿寨乡; traditional Chinese: 熊兒寨鄉; pinyin: Xióng'erzhài Xiāng) is a township located at northern Pinggu District, Beijing, China. It is at the foothill of the Yan Mountain Range. The township borders Zhenluoying Town to the north, Huangsongyu Township and Nandulehe Town to the east, Shandongzhuang and Wangxinzhuang Towns to the south, and Dahuashan Town to the west. Its population was 2,859 as of 2020.

Xiong'erzhai (Chinese: 熊儿寨; lit. 'Bear Stockade') was said to be first established by the Yellow Emperor during his war with Chiyou, and the region was named in honor of his clan, Youxiong (Chinese: 有熊; lit. 'Possessor of Bears').

== History ==
Timeline of Xiong'erzhai Township
Year	Status	Within
1956 - 1958	Xiong'erzhai Township	Pinggu County, Hebei
1958 - 1961	Dahuashan People's Commune	Pinggu County, Beijing
1961 - 1984	Xiong'erzhai People's Commune	Pinggu County, Beijing
1984 - 2002	Xiong'erzhai Township	Pinggu County, Beijing
2002–present	Xiong'erzhai Township	Pinggu District, Beijing

== Administrative divisions ==
As of the year 2021, Xiong'erzhai Township was composed of 8 villages, all of which are shown in the following list:

Subdivision names	Name transliterations
熊儿寨	Xiong'erzhai
北土门	Beitumen
南岔	Nancha
魏家湾	Weijiawan
东沟	Donggou
东长峪	Dongchangyu
花峪	Huayu
老泉口	Laoquankou

== See also ==
- List of township-level divisions of Beijing
