= Gaoling, Beijing =

Town in Miyun,Beijing,China

Gaoling Town 高岭镇
- Town
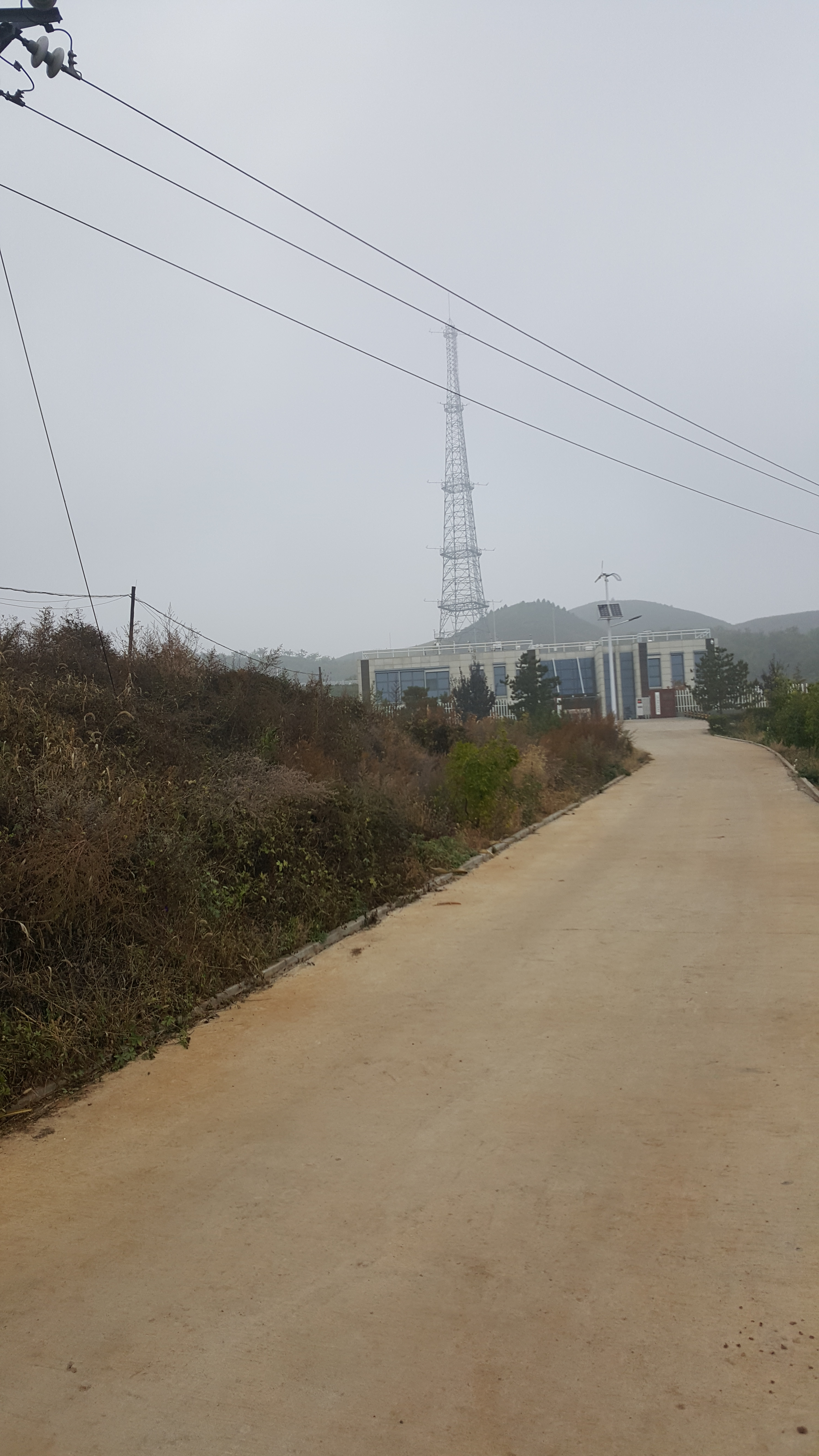
- Shangdianzi Weather Station within the town, 2016

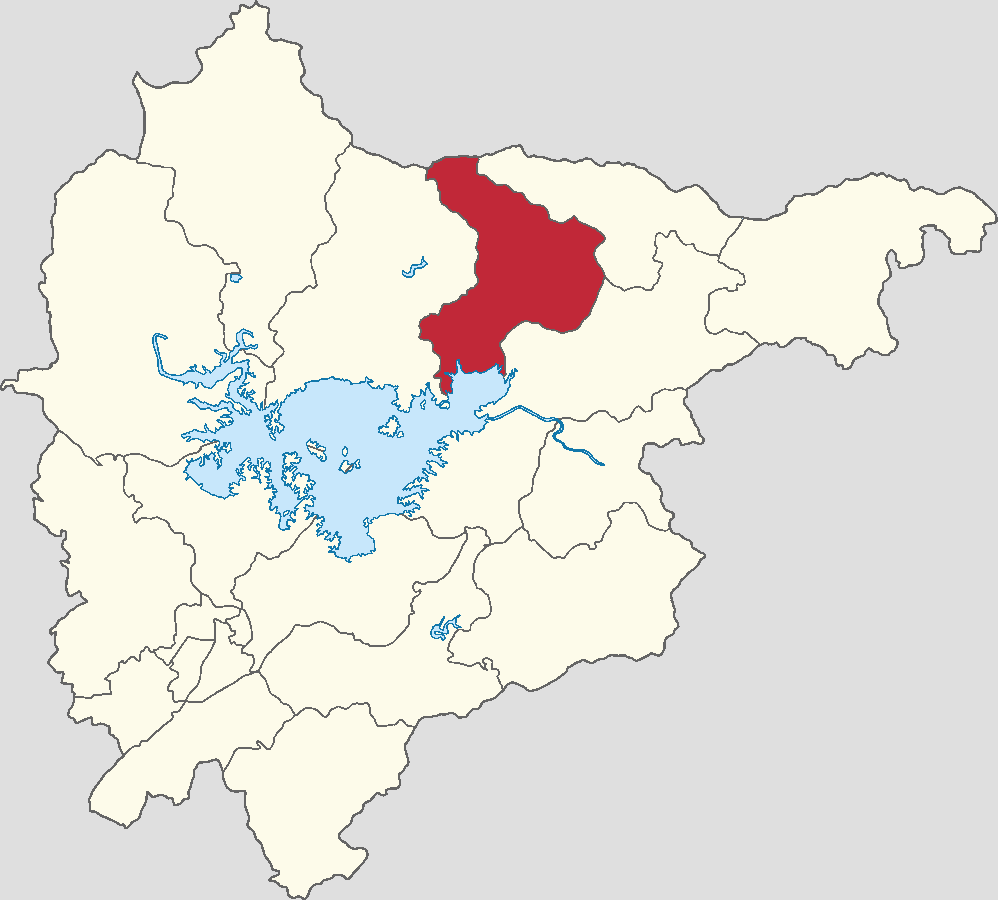
- Location of Gaoling Town in Miyun District

- Location within Beijing Location within China
- Coordinates: 40°36′01″N 117°06′26″E
- Country: China
- Municipality: Beijing
- District: Miyun
- Village-level Divisions: 2 communities 21 villages

Area
  - Total: 119.8 km^{2} (46.3 sq mi)
- Elevation: 177 m (581 ft)

Population (2020)
  - Total: 9,967
  - Density: 83.20/km^{2} (215.5/sq mi)
- Time zone: UTC+8 (China Standard)
- Postal code: 101507
- Area code: 010

Gaoling Town (simplified Chinese: 高岭镇; traditional Chinese: 高嶺鎮; pinyin: Gāolǐng Zhèn) is a town located in the Miyun District of Beijing, China. Situated north of Miyun Reservoir, it shares border with Bakeshiying Town to its north, Gubeikou Town to its northeast, Taishitun Town to its southeast, and Bulaotun Town to its west. The population of Gaoling was 9,967 as of 2020.

The name Gaoling can be translated as "Tall Mountain", and is referring to Gaoling Village, where the town's government is located in.

== History ==
History of Gaoling Town
Year	Status	Within
1953 - 1958	Gaoling Township	Miyun County, Hebei
1958 - 1983	Gaoling People's Commune	Miyun County, Beijing
1983 - 1993	Gaoling Township	Miyun County, Beijing
1993 - 2015	Gaoling Town (Merged with Shang Dianzi Township in 1993)	Miyun County, Beijing
2015–present	Gaoling Town (Merged with Shang Dianzi Township in 1993)	Miyun District, Beijing

== Administrative divisions ==
By the end of 2021, these 23 subdivisions constituted Gaoling Town:

Subdivision names	Name transliterations	Type
高岭	Gaoling	Community
上甸子	Shangdianzi	Community
下会	Xiahui	Village
辛庄	Xinzhuang	Village
放马峪	Fangmayu	Village
高岭	Gaoling	Village
高岭屯	Gaolingtun	Village
白河涧	Baihejian	Village
瑶亭	Yaoting	Village
芹菜岭	Qincailing	Village
东关	Dongguan	Village
石匣	Shili	Village
大屯	Datun	Village
栗榛寨	Lizhenzhai	Village
四合村	Sihecun	Village
小开岭	Xiao Kailing	Village
大开岭	Da Kailing	Village
上甸子	Shangdianzi	Village
下甸子	Xiadianzi	Village
下河	Xiahe	Village
郝家台	Haojiatai	Village
界牌峪	Jiepaiyu	Village
田庄	Tianzhuang	Village

== Climate ==
Climate data for Shangdianzixiang, Miyun District (1991–2020 normals)
Month	Jan	Feb	Mar	Apr	May	Jun	Jul	Aug	Sep	Oct	Nov	Dec	Year
Mean daily maximum °C (°F)	0.2 (32.4)	4.2 (39.6)	11.2 (52.2)	19.4 (66.9)	25.8 (78.4)	29.3 (84.7)	30.3 (86.5)	29.5 (85.1)	25.1 (77.2)	18.0 (64.4)	8.6 (47.5)	1.3 (34.3)	16.9 (62.4)
Daily mean °C (°F)	−6.2 (20.8)	−2.4 (27.7)	4.7 (40.5)	12.9 (55.2)	19.0 (66.2)	22.9 (73.2)	24.8 (76.6)	23.6 (74.5)	18.4 (65.1)	11.2 (52.2)	2.4 (36.3)	−4.8 (23.4)	10.5 (51.0)
Mean daily minimum °C (°F)	−11.2 (11.8)	−7.9 (17.8)	−1.4 (29.5)	6.4 (43.5)	12.1 (53.8)	16.9 (62.4)	20.2 (68.4)	19.1 (66.4)	13.1 (55.6)	5.7 (42.3)	−2.6 (27.3)	−9.5 (14.9)	5.1 (41.1)
Average precipitation mm (inches)	1.9 (0.07)	3.7 (0.15)	8.7 (0.34)	24.3 (0.96)	52.6 (2.07)	79.1 (3.11)	166.6 (6.56)	123.0 (4.84)	57.1 (2.25)	31.2 (1.23)	12.8 (0.50)	2.3 (0.09)	563.3 (22.17)
Average precipitation days (≥ 0.1 mm)	1.4	2.0	3.0	4.9	7.2	11.5	13.9	11.2	8.1	5.3	3.2	1.7	73.4
Average snowy days	2.4	2.6	2.1	0.4	0	0	0	0	0	0.2	2.2	2.8	12.7
Average relative humidity (%)	42	41	39	40	49	62	75	76	69	58	51	46	54
Mean monthly sunshine hours	202.5	196.1	232.1	240.9	263.4	228.4	201.9	223.4	219.0	212.4	184.6	191.1	2,595.8
Percentage possible sunshine	68	65	62	60	59	51	44	53	59	63	63	67	60
Source: China Meteorological Administration

== Transportation ==
The town is primarily connected to the outside through Beijing–Tongliao railway and Liuxin Road.

== Gallery ==
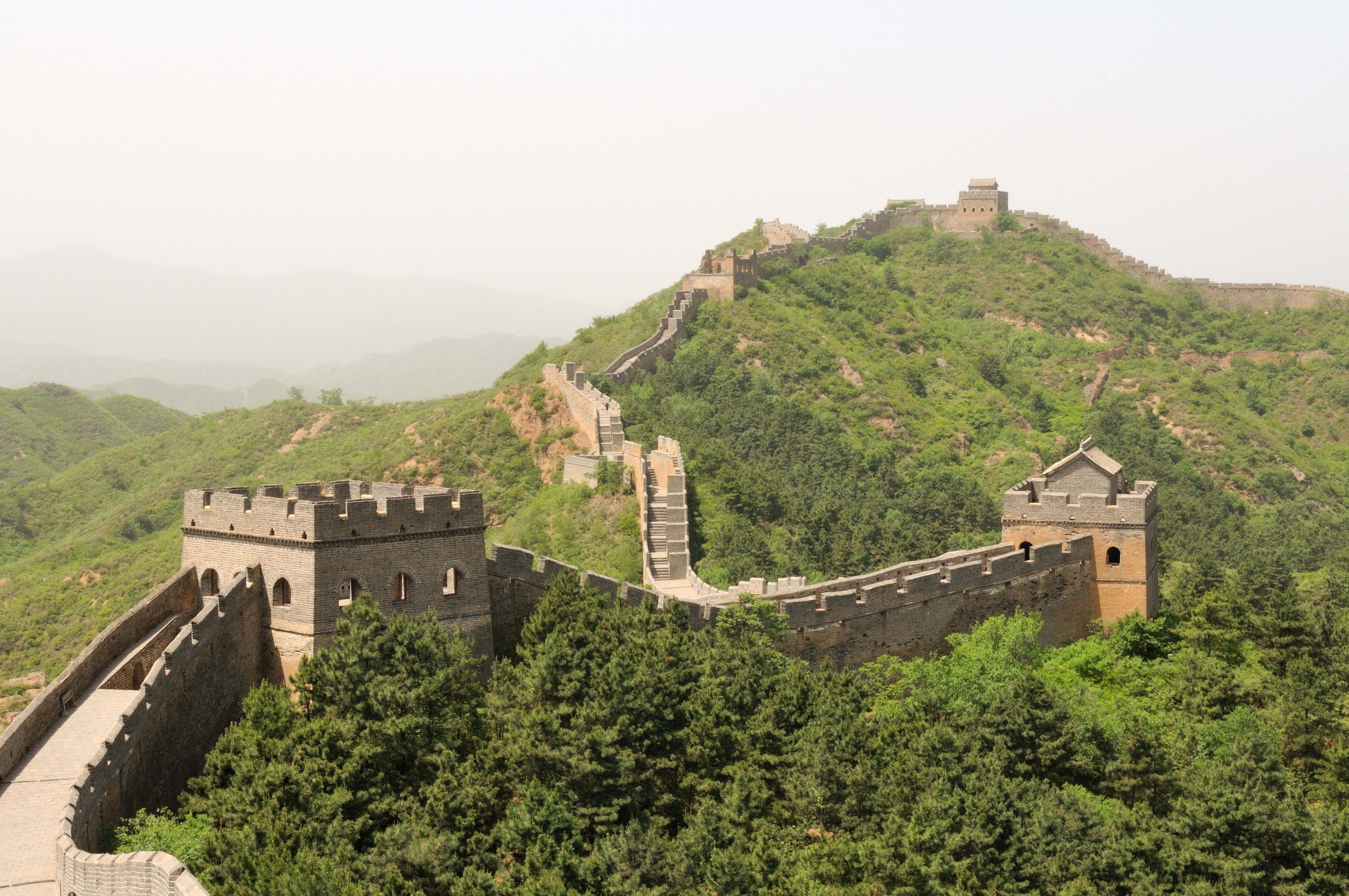
Section of the Great Wall near Xinzhuang Village, 2008

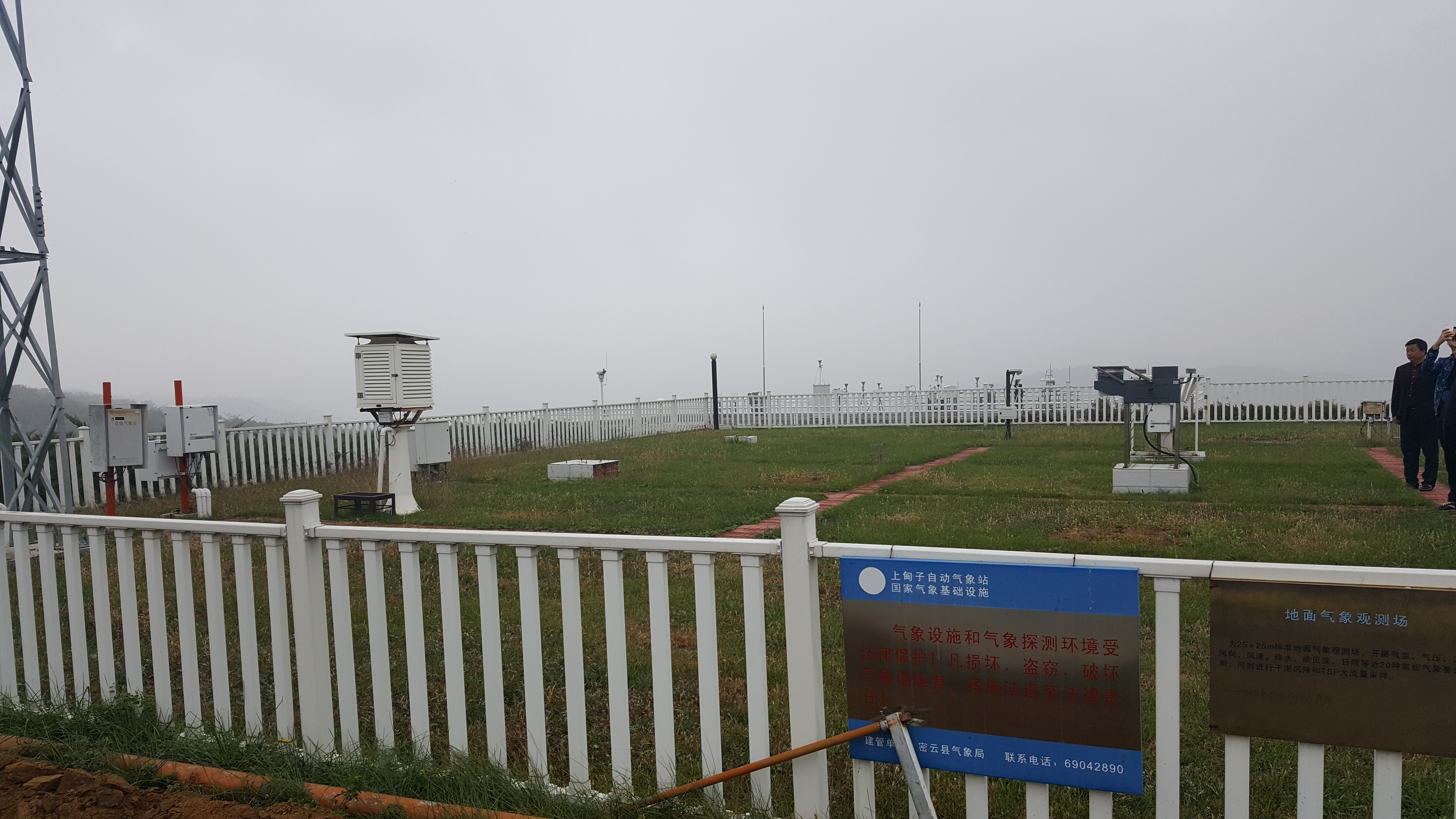
Interior of Shangdianzi Weather Station, 2016

== See also ==
- List of township-level divisions of Beijing
