= Mount Wuling =

Mountain in Xinglong County and Miyun District, Beijing, China

Highest point
- Elevation: 2,118 m (6,949 ft)
- Prominence: 1,527 m (5,010 ft)
- Listing: Ultra, Ribu
- Coordinates: 40°37′17″N 117°26′11″E

Naming
- Native name: 雾灵山 (Mandarin Chinese); Wùlíng Shān (Chinese)

Geography
- Parent range: Yan Mountains

Mount Wuling (Chinese: 雾灵山; pinyin: Wùlíng Shān) is a mountain located at the border of Xinglong County, Chengde, Hebei Province and Miyun District, Beijing. It is the main peak of Yan Mountains, with a height of 2118 m above sea level.

The mount raised during the Yanshanian movement period; Yanshanian syenites are usually found in the main part of it. The soil developed from granite residual soil. Its average temperature is 7.9 °C.

== See also ==
- List of ultras of Tibet, East Asia and neighbouring areas
