= Gubeikou =

Gubeikou Town 古北口镇
- Town
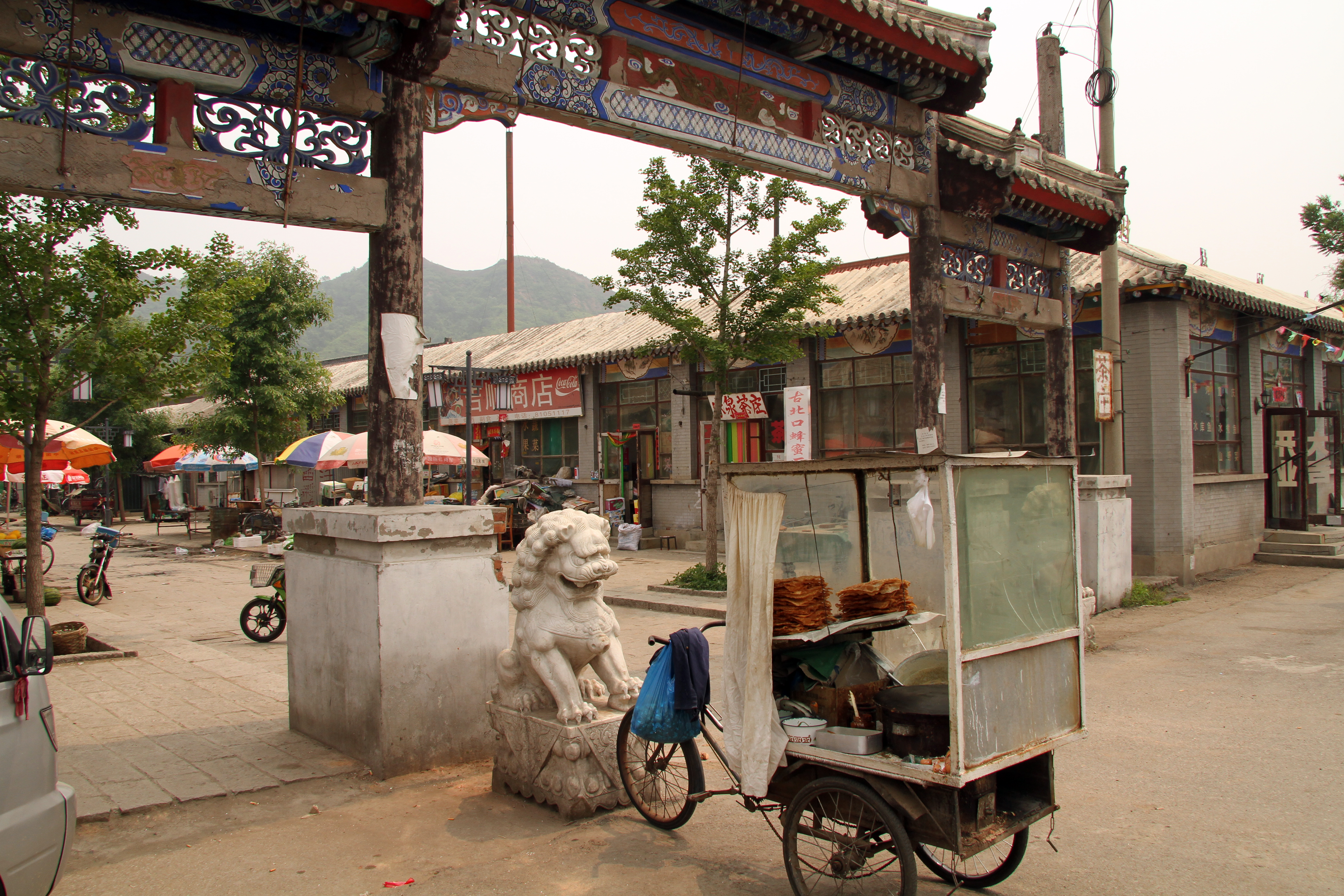
- Town center of Gubeikou, 2010

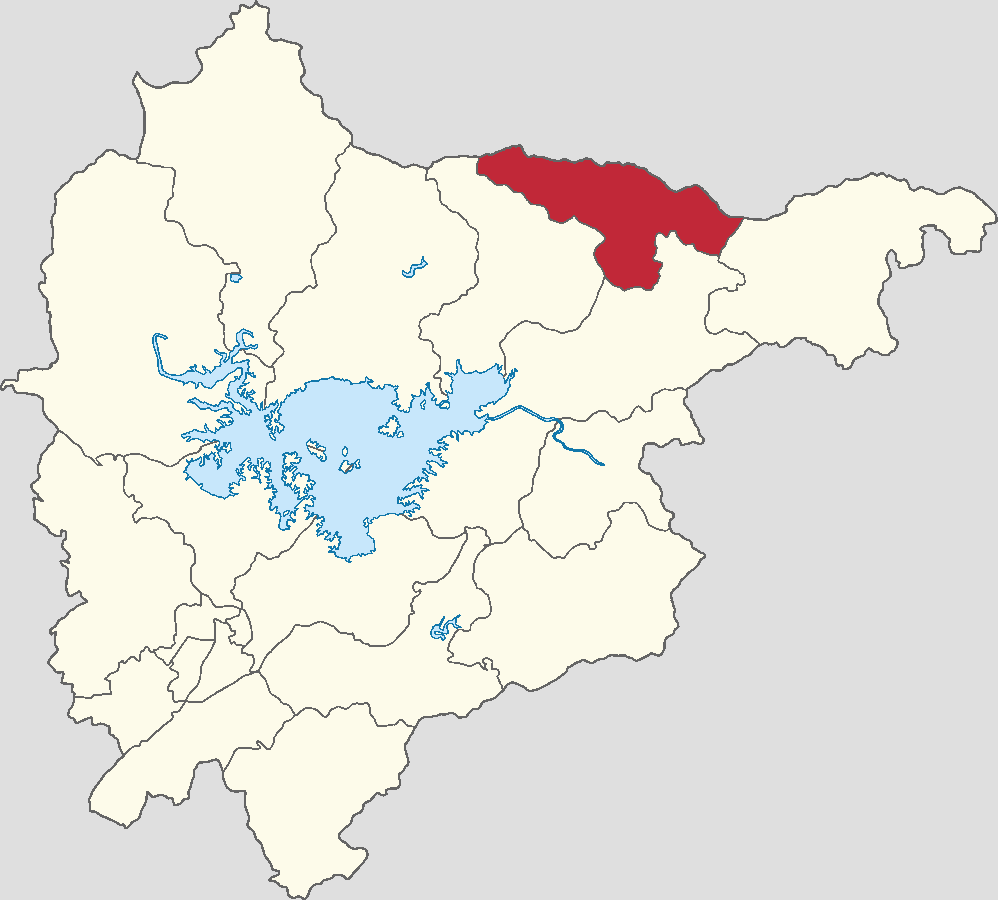
- Location within Miyun District

- Location within Beijing Location within China
- Coordinates: 40°41′24″N 117°09′26″E
- Country: China
- Municipality: Beijing
- District: Miyun
- Village-level Divisions: 4 communities 9 villages

Area
  - Total: 86.3 km^{2} (33.3 sq mi)
- Elevation: 216 m (709 ft)

Population (2020)
  - Total: 7,170
  - Density: 83.1/km^{2} (215/sq mi)
- Time zone: UTC+8 (China Standard)
- Postal code: 101508
- Area code: 010

Gubeikou Town (simplified Chinese: 古北口镇; traditional Chinese: 古北口鎮; pinyin: Gǔběikǒu Zhèn) is a town of Miyun District in northeastern Beijing, traversed by G101, bordering with Luanping County, Hebei to the north and the Beijing towns of Gaoling (高岭镇) to the west, Xinchengzi (新城子镇) to the east and Taishitun (太师屯镇). The area is one of the important passes of the Great Wall of China, serving as an ancient chokepoint for travelers between Northeast China and Beijing. As of 2020, it had a total population of 7,170 under its administration.

== Name ==
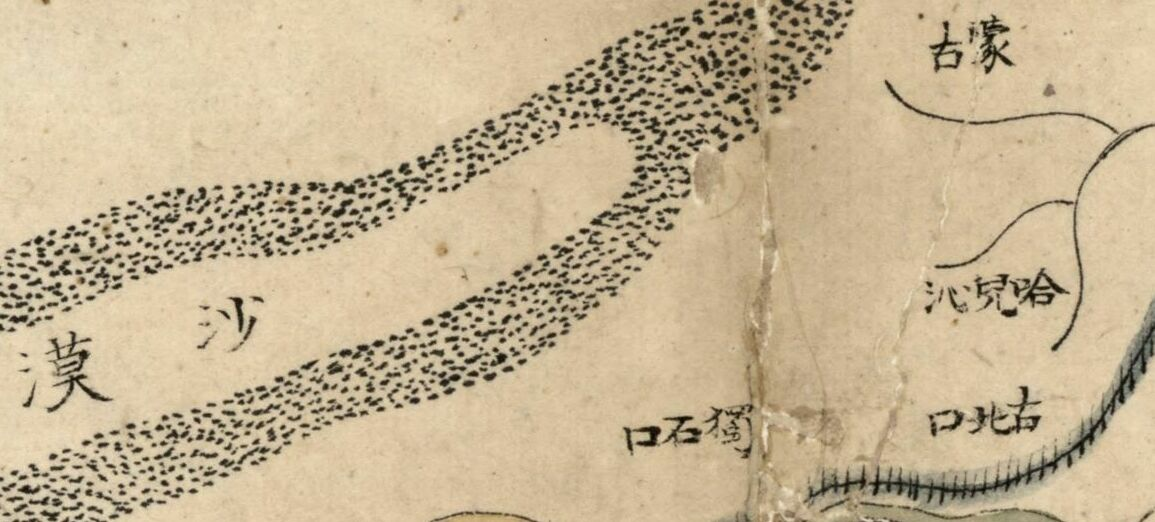
Gubeikou and Dushikou marked as the principal gateways through the Great Wall on the general map in the 1754 Provincial Atlas of the Qing Empire

This town's name originated in 1736. During Qianlong Emperor's visit, he named this region by combining two inscripted names, Guguan (simplified Chinese: 古关; traditional Chinese: 古關; lit. 'Old Pass') and Beikou (Chinese: 北口; lit. 'North Gate'), into Gubeikou (Chinese: 古北口; lit. 'Old North Gate') that is still being used to this day.

== History ==
Timeline of Gubeikou's History
Time	Status	Belong to
Northern Song	Beikou Pass	Miyun County, Tan Department
Jin dynasty	Beikou Fort	Miyun County, Tan Department
Yuan dynasty	Beikou Relay Station	Miyun County, Tan Department
Ming dynasty	Miyun Houwei	Miyun County, Shuntian Prefecture
Qing dynasty	Gubeikou Fort	Miyun County, Shuntian Prefecture
1912 - 1928	Gubeikou Town	Miyun District, Capital Area
1928 - 1934	Gubeikou Town	Miyun District, Hebei
1934 - 1946	Gubeikou Town	Jimi District, Rehe
1946 - 1949	Gubeikou Town	Chengxingmi United County, Hebei
1949 - 1958	Gubeikou Town	Miyun County, Hebei
1958 - 1961	Gubeikou Town	Miyun County, Beijing
1961 - 1983	Gubeikou People's Commune	Miyun County, Beijing
1983 - 1990	Gubeikou Township	Miyun County, Beijing
1990 - 2015	Gubeikou Town	Miyun County, Beijing
2015–present	Gubeikou Town	Miyun District, Beijing

== Administrative divisions ==
So far in 2021, Gubeikou Town is composed of 13 subdivisions, of which 4 are communities and 9 are villages. They are listed as follows:

Administrative Division Codes	Subdivision names	Name transliterations	Type
110118112001	南关社区	Nanguansheqv	Community
110118112002	北关社区	Beiguansheqv	Community
110118112003	长城社区	Changchengsheqv	Community
110118112004	水镇社区	Shuizhensheqv	Community
110118112201	古北口村	Gubeikoucun	Village
110118112202	河西村	Hexicun	Village
110118112203	潮河关村	Chaoguancun	Village
110118112204	杨庄子村	Yangzhuangzicun	Village
110118112205	龙洋	Longyangcun	Village
110118112206	北台村	Beitaicun	Village
110118112207	汤河村	Yanghecun	Village
110118112208	司马台村	Simataicun	Village
110118112209	东笃里村	Dongdulicun	Village

== Landmark ==
- Simatai

== Gallery ==
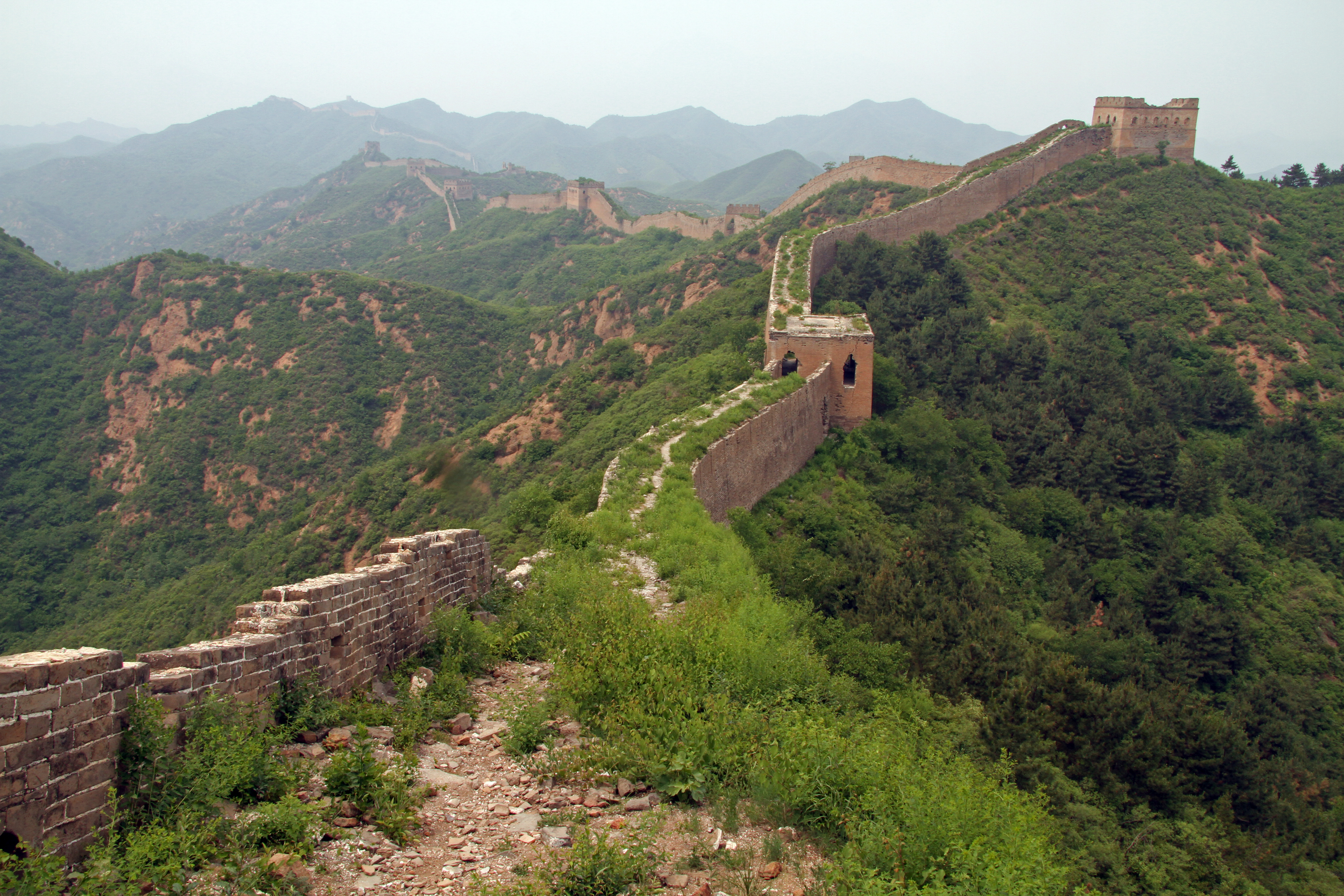
The Gubeikou Great Wall towards Jinshanling, 2010

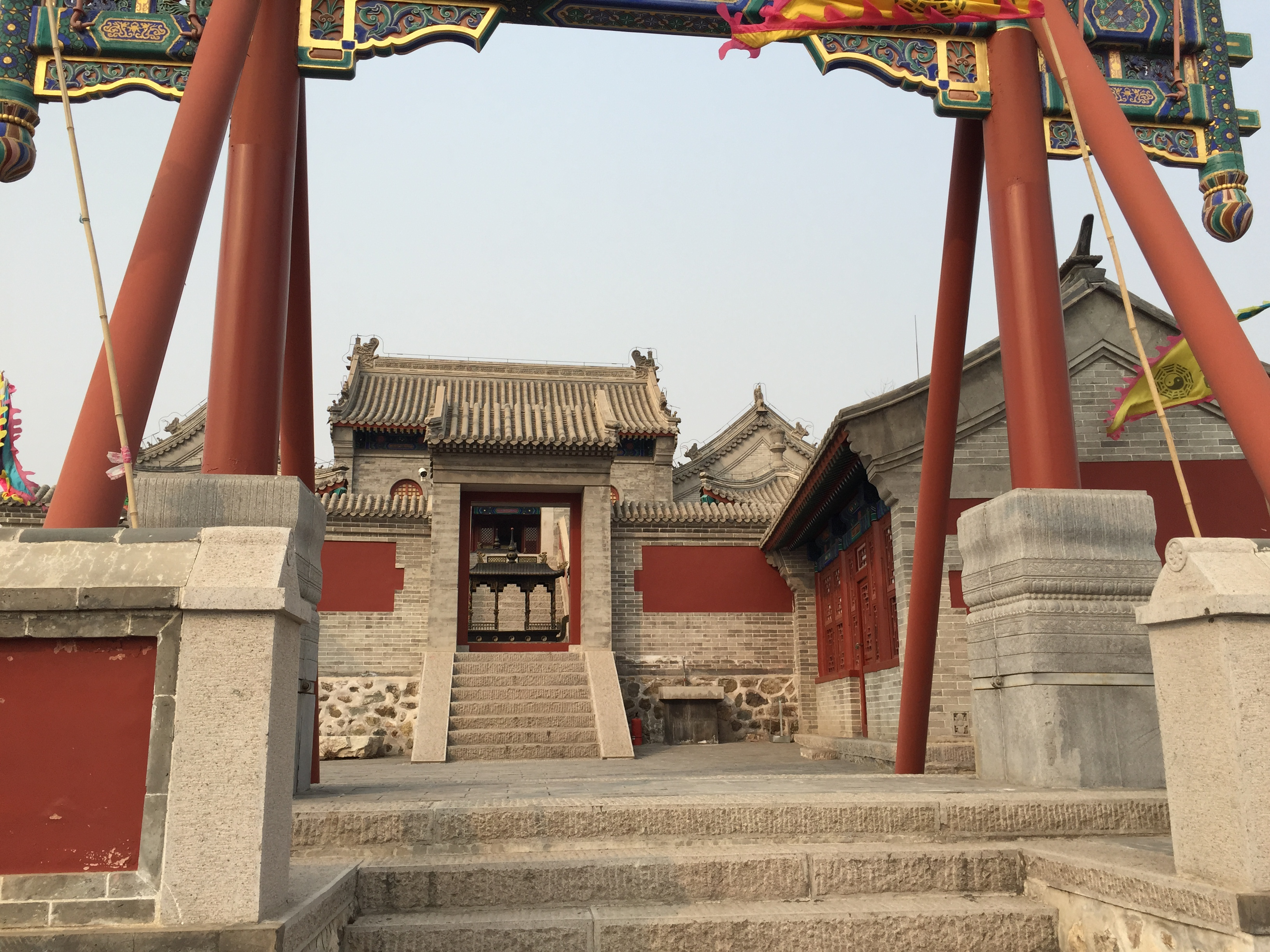
Gubeikou Taoist Temple, 2015

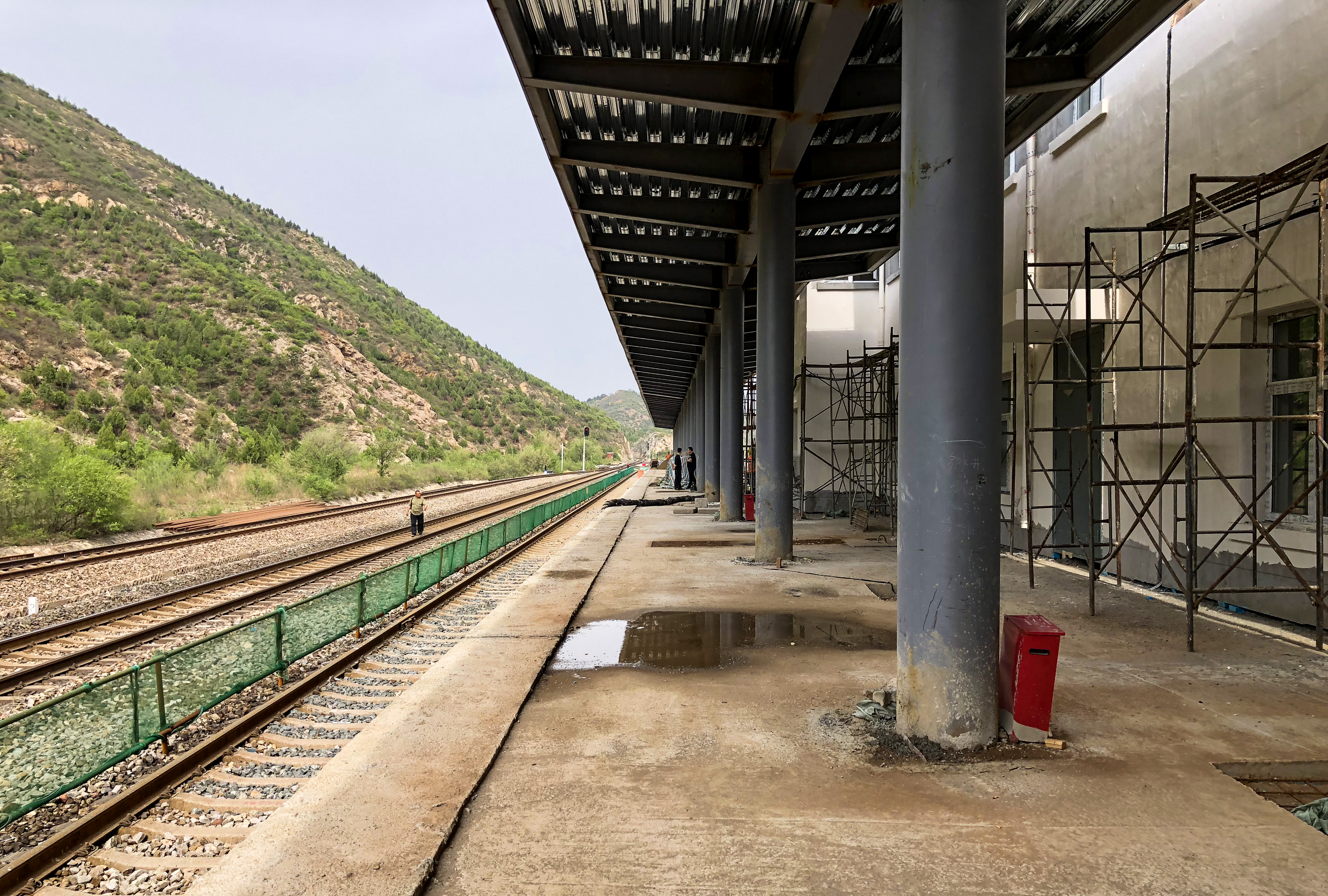
Gubeikou Railway Station, 2018

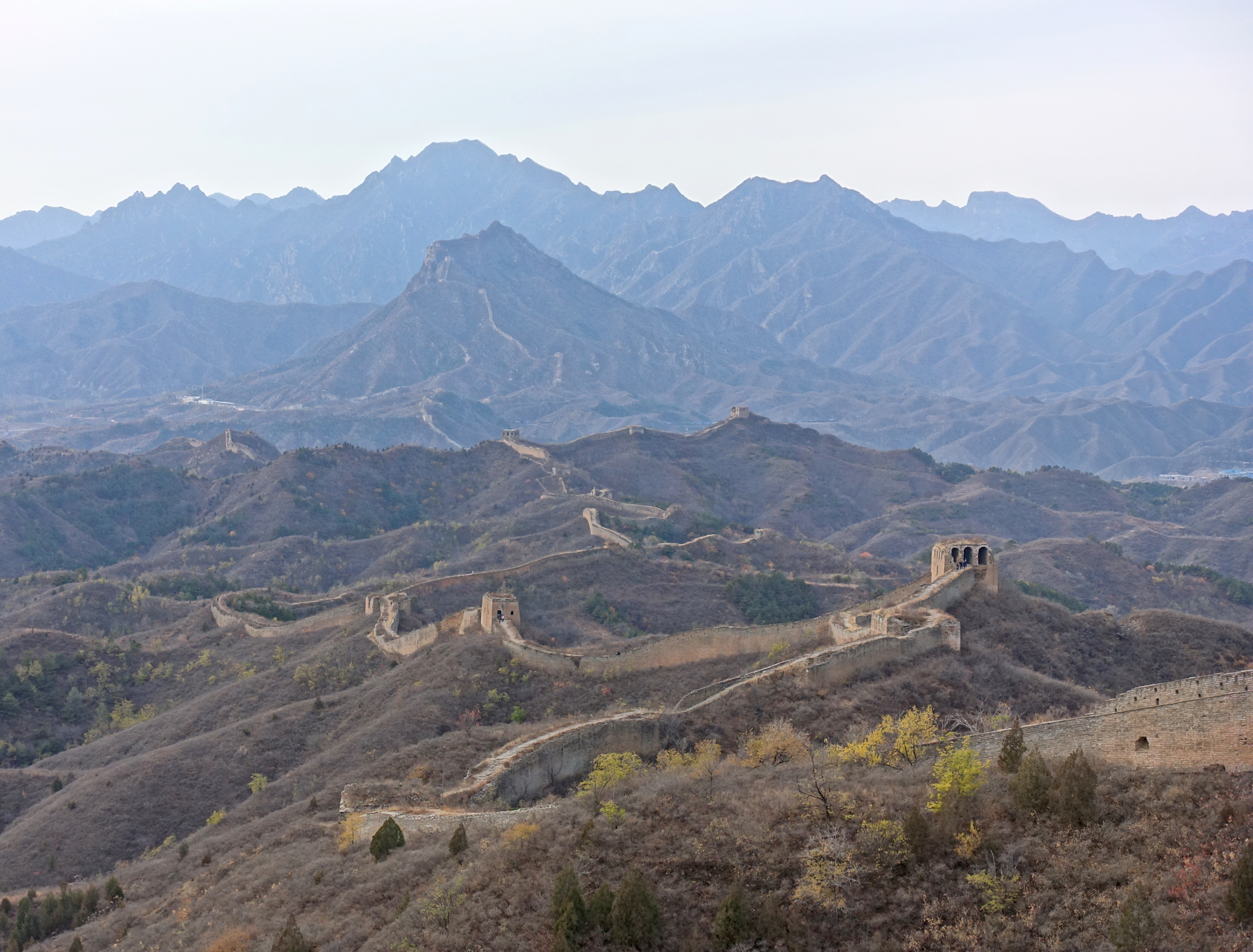
Gubeikou section of the Great Wall of China (facing west), 2018

== See also ==
- List of township-level divisions of Beijing
