= Yan Mountains =

Mountain range in Hebei Province, China

Coordinates: 41°00′N 120°00′E

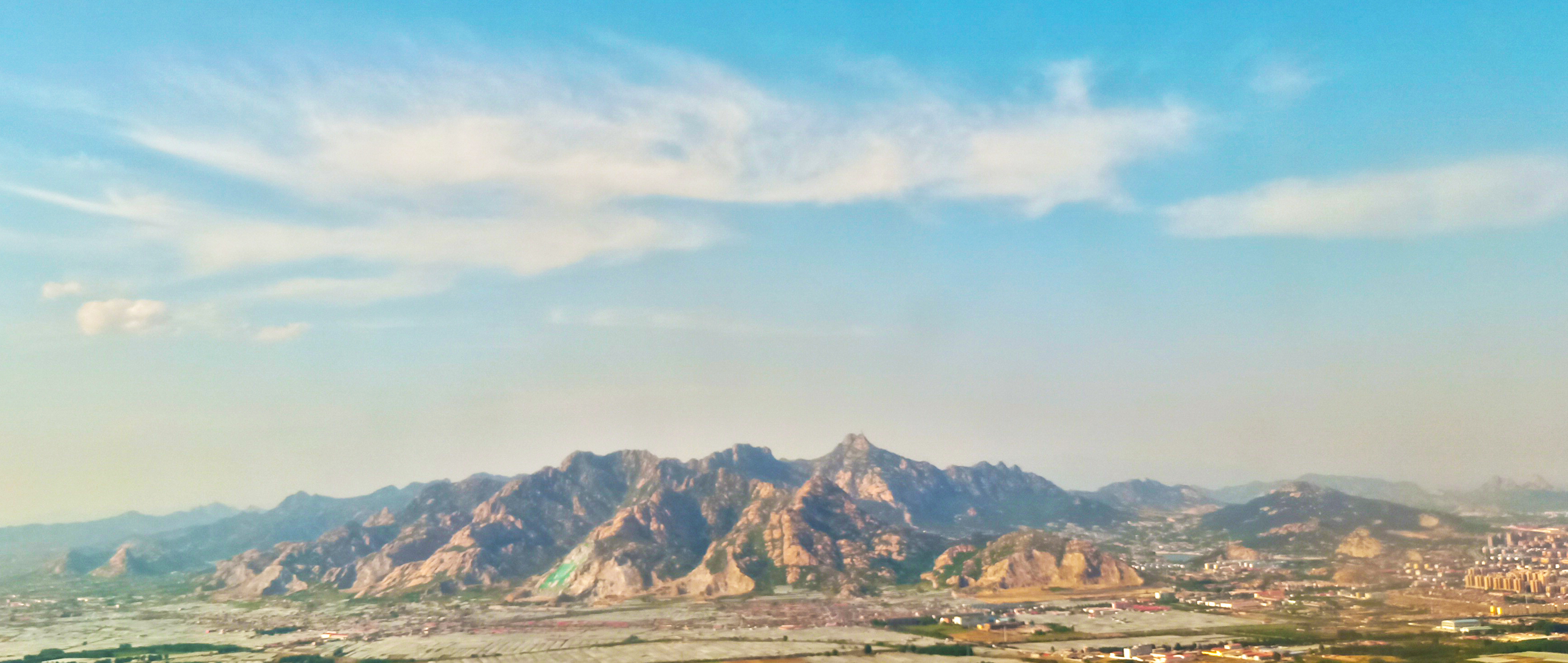
- Chinese: 燕山
- Literal meaning: Yan Mountains; Swallow Mountains
Transcriptions
Standard Mandarin
- Hanyu Pinyin: Yānshān
- Wade–Giles: Yen Shan

The Yan Mountains, also known by their Chinese name Yanshan, (Note: These names are sometimes redundantly combined as the "Yanshan Mountains".) are a major mountain range to the north of the North China Plain, principally in the province of Hebei.

The range rises between the Chaobai River on the west and the Shanhai Pass on the east. It consists mostly of limestone, granite, and basalt. Its altitude ranges from 400 to 1000 meters. The main peak, Mount Wuling, is 2,116 meters (6,942 ft) above sea level and is located in Xinglong County in Hebei. The range contains many narrow passes, such as the Gubei Pass, the Xifeng Pass, and the Leng Pass. The eastern stretch of the Great Wall of China, including Badaling in northern Beijing, can be found in the Yan Mountains. The mountains are also an important traffic gateway between the north and south.
